= List of administrative divisions of Hanoi =

The municipalities in Hanoi

This is a list of the 126 administrative divisions, including 51 wards and 75 communes of Hanoi in Vietnam.

== Wards ==
No.	Name	Population (2025)	Area (km^{2})	Density (pop/km^{2})	People Committee's Chairman
1	Hoàn Kiếm	98,502	1.93	51,037.3	Trịnh Hoàng Tùng
2	Cửa Nam	66,667	1.65	40,404.2	Nguyễn Quốc Hoàn
3	Ba Đình	65,023	2.97	21,893.3	Phạm Thị Diễm
4	Ngọc Hà	93,536	2.68	34,901.5	Lương Xuân Dương
5	Giảng Võ	97,034	2.60	37,320.8	Cồ Như Dũng
6	Hai Bà Trưng	87,801	2.65	33,132.5	Nguyễn Mạnh Hùng
7	Vĩnh Tuy	90,583	2.33	38,876.8	Vũ Văn Hoạt
8	Bạch Mai	129,517	2.95	43,904.1	Nguyễn Thị Thu Hiền
9	Đống Đa	81,358	2.08	39,114.4	Trịnh Hữu Tuấn
10	Kim Liên	95,592	2.43	39,338.3	Lê Thị Kim Huệ
11	Văn Miếu – Quốc Tử Giám	105,604	1.92	55,002.1	Hà Anh Tuấn
12	Láng	74,570	1.85	40,308.1	Nguyễn Thanh Tùng
13	Ô Chợ Dừa	72,586	1.82	39,882.4	Lê Tuấn Định
14	Hồng Hà	123,282	15.09	8,169.8	Lê Hồng Thắng
15	Lĩnh Nam	20,706	10.86	1,906.6	Nguyễn Văn Đức
16	Hoàng Mai	98,502	9.04	10,896,2	Nguyễn Lê Hiến
17	Vĩnh Hưng	67,561	4.47	15,114.3	Phạm Hải Bình
18	Tương Mai	136,292	3.56	38,284.3	Đào Thị Thu Hằng
19	Định Công	85,502	5.34	16,011.6	Nguyễn Tuấn Anh
20	Hoàng Liệt	55,820	4.04	13.816,8	Nguyễn Anh Tuấn
21	Yên Sở	40,948	5.62	7,286.1	Vũ Tuấn Đạt
22	Thanh Xuân	106,316	3.24	32,813.6	Đỗ Quang Dương
23	Khương Đình	86,286	3.10	27,834.2	Nguyễn Sỹ Đoàn
24	Phương Liệt	81,977	3.20	25,617.8	Đặng Khánh Hòa
25	Cầu Giấy	74,516	3.74	19,924.1	Ngô Ngọc Phương
26	Nghĩa Đô	125,568	4.34	28,932.7	Trần Đình Cường
27	Yên Hòa	77,029	4.10	18,787.6	Trịnh Thị Dung
28	Tây Hồ	100,122	10.72	9,339.7	Nguyễn Thanh Tịnh
29	Phú Thượng	39,322	7.71	5,100.1	Đỗ Đình Sơn
30	Tây Tựu	39,436	7.54	5,230.2	Vũ Duy Hùng
31	Phú Diễn	74,603	6.29	11,860.6	Nguyễn Văn Hải
32	Xuân Đỉnh	48,658	5.46	8,911.7	Nguyễn Thường Sơn
33	Đông Ngạc	83,544	8.85	9,440.0	Nguyễn Văn Hách
34	Thượng Cát	24,692	14.77	1,671.8	Lê Thị Thu Hương
35	Từ Liêm	119,997	10.18	11,787.5	Nguyễn Thanh Bình
36	Xuân Phương	104,947	10.84	9,681.5	Nguyễn Quốc Nam
37	Tây Mỗ	46,894	5.56	8,434.2	Trần Thanh Hải
38	Đại Mỗ	80,462	8.10	9,933.6	Phùng Ngọc Sơn
39	Long Biên	62,887	19.04	3,302.9	Hoàng Hải
40	Bồ Đề	120,028	12,94	9,275.7	Phạm Bạch Đằng
41	Việt Hưng	83,188	12.91	6,443.7	Vũ Xuân Trường
42	Phúc Lợi	66,790	10.41	6,415.9	Nguyễn Thị Thanh Hằng
43	Hà Đông	185,205	9.00	2,058.3	Trần Thị Lương An
44	Dương Nội	56,091	7.90	7,100.1	Phùng Chi Tâm
45	Yên Nghĩa	49,643	13.18	3,766.5	Lê Xuân Hoàn
46	Phú Lương	52,024	9.40	5,534.5	Lã Quang Thức
47	Kiến Hưng	70,833	6.65	10,651.6	Chu Mạnh Hà
48	Thanh Liệt	76,238	6.44	11,838.2	Bùi Huy Hoàng
49	Chương Mỹ	87,913	38.90	2,260.0	Trịnh Duy Oai
50	Sơn Tây	71,301	23.08	3,089.3	Nguyễn Thị Thu Hương
51	Tùng Thiện	42,052	32.34	1,300.3	Nguyễn Viết Đạt

== Communes ==
No.	Name	Population (2025)	Area (km^{2})	Density (pop/km^{2})	People Committee's Chairman
1	Thanh Trì	51,393	9.94	5,170.3	Lã Văn Huy
2	Đại Thanh	92,557	18.92	4,892.0	Nguyễn Văn Hưng
3	Nam Phù	42,772	13.74	3,113.0	Nguyễn Thị Thu Huyền
4	Ngọc Hồi	43,864	13.35	3,285.7	Trần Việt Trung
5	Thượng Phúc	45,464	28.91	1,572.6	Lý Văn Dũng
6	Thường Tín	70,739	28.29	2.500.5	Phan Thanh Tùng
7	Chương Dương	59,973	28.89	2,075.9	Từ Ngọc Thanh
8	Hồng Vân	58,685	24.53	2,392.4	Lê Tuấn Dũng
9	Phú Xuyên	96,635	60.02	1,610.0	Bùi Công Thân
10	Phượng Dực	60,281	44.69	1,348.9	Nguyễn Trọng Vĩnh
11	Chuyên Mỹ	44,859	35.54	1,262.2	Nguyễn Hữu Chi
12	Đại Xuyên	74,906	51.66	1,450.0	Hoàng Tuân
13	Thanh Oai	54,475	26.86	2,028.1	Vũ Quỳnh
14	Bình Minh	80,066	29.86	2,681.4	Nguyễn Đăng Việt
15	Tam Hưng	39,087	29.45	1,327.2	Bùi Đình Thái
16	Dân Hòa	62,755	38.43	1,633.0	Đinh Hữu Bình
17	Vân Đình	74,906	51.66	1,462.2	Nguyễn Ngọc Điệp
18	Ứng Thiên	53,962	38.40	1,405.3	Đỗ Năng Bình
19	Hòa Xá	69,428	40.42	1,717.7	Dương Tuấn Anh
20	Ứng Hòa	63,750	67.80	940.3	Nguyễn Đức Bình
21	Mỹ Đức	53,640	52.73	1,017.3	Nguyễn Quang Đường
22	Hồng Sơn	63,130	54.38	1,160.9	Ngô Quốc Ca
23	Phúc Sơn	54,084	49.31	1,096.8	Trần Xuân Hải
24	Hương Sơn	52,634	69.11	7,616.0	Lê Văn Trang
25	Phú Nghĩa	71,048	40.25	1,765.2	Nguyễn Đình Sỹ
26	Xuân Mai	67,310	50.72	1,327.1	Nguyễn Anh Đức
27	Trần Phú	47,528	44.36	1,071.4	Đỗ Hoàng Anh Châu
28	Hòa Phú	49,948	29.87	1,672.2	Vũ Xuân Hùng
29	Quảng Bị	62,968	37.14	1,695.4	Bùi Mạnh Thắng
30	Minh Châu	6,646	10.36	0.64	Bùi Thái Sơn
31	Quảng Oai	59,001	49.26	1,197.8	Nguyễn Thị Nam
32	Vật Lại	58,579	51.75	1,132.0	Nguyễn Đức Anh
33	Cổ Đô	70,706	53.25	1,327.8	Hoàng Trúc Phong
34	Bất Bạt	40,066	56.43	710.0	Nguyễn Ngọc Tú
35	Suối Hai	35,201	51.56	682.7	Nguyễn Ngọc Mạnh
36	Ba Vì	26,651	81.27	328.0	Nguyễn Giáp Đông
37	Yên Bài	21,416	68.19	314.1	Nguyễn Văn Tùng
38	Đoài Phương	39,828	57.10	697.5	Nguyễn Thế Hùng
39	Phúc Thọ	75,425	39.66	1,901.8	Kiều Trọng Sỹ
40	Phúc Lộc	61,457	41.15	1,493.5	Lê Văn Thu
41	Hát Môn	72,227	37.67	1,917.4	Lý Hoàng Kiên
42	Thạch Thất	57,645	31.93	1,805.4	Trần Hoàng Linh
43	Hạ Bằng	38,721	32.14	1,204.8	Nguyễn Kim Loan
44	Tây Phương	99,874	31.10	3,211.4	Cần Văn Hương
45	Hòa Lạc	20,815	35.37	328.0	Đào Xuân Ban
46	Yên Xuân	29,375	78.01	376.6	Phùng Khắc Sơn
47	Quốc Oai	63,344	24.00	2,639.3	Nguyễn Trung Thành
48	Hưng Đạo	49,357	24.90	1,982.2	Dương Văn Phượng
49	Kiều Phú	60,885	34.49	1,765.3	Phùng Huy Diễn
50	Phú Cát	43,339	51.21	846.3	Hoàng Nguyên Ưng
51	Hoài Đức	69,239	16.73	4,138.6	Nguyễn Huy Hoàng
52	Dương Hòa	58,830	17.41	3,379.1	Lê Đức Phóng
53	Sơn Đồng	63,267	21.57	2,933.1	Phạm Gia Lộc
54	An Khánh	102,136	28.69	3,560.0	Hồ Trung Nghĩa
55	Đan Phượng	47,629	15.30	3,113.0	Nguyễn Viết Đạt
56	Ô Diên	97,506	32.06	3,041.4	Đỗ Chí Hưng
57	Liên Minh	47,769	23.57	2,026.7	Nguyễn Quý Mạnh
58	Gia Lâm	90,498	25.72	3,517.4	Dương Việt Cường
59	Thuận An	68,292	29.67	2,301.7	Nguyễn Tuấn Khanh
60	Bát Tràng	48,987	20.67	2,369.0	Hoàng Tiến Dũng
61	Phù Đổng	111,484	41.62	2,678.6	Đào Đức Minh
62	Thư Lâm	102,580	43.84	2,339.9	Lê Đức Phóng
63	Đông Anh	118,183	48.68	2,427.8	Nguyễn Văn Thiềng
64	Phúc Thịnh	95,951	42,63	2,250.8	Nguyễn Văn Bằng
65	Thiên Lộc	74,597	27.96	2,668.0	Nguyễn Hữu Dũng
66	Vĩnh Thanh	64,698	22.52	2,872.9	Nguyễn Quang Đặng
67	Mê Linh	62,197	34.97	1,778.6	Trần Thanh Hoài
68	Yên Lãng	71,339	44.81	1,592.0	Lê Văn Khương
69	Tiến Thắng	64,246	36.34	1,767.9	Nguyễn Minh Hải
70	Quang Minh	69,623	32,17	2,164.2	Nguyễn Tiến Dũng
71	Sóc Sơn	117,876	68,24	1,727.4	Phạm Quang Ngọc
72	Đa Phúc	83,649	55.32	1,512.1	Đỗ Thu Nga
73	Nội Bài	70,469	51.64	1,364.6	Hồ Việt Hùng
74	Trung Giã	61,315	77.52	791.0	Lê Văn Khương
75	Kim Anh	48,564	52.80	919.8	Đỗ Minh Tuấn

== See also ==
- List of cities in Vietnam
