= Hoàng Mai, Hanoi =

Hoàng Mai Ward Phường Hoàng Mai Xã Hồng Mai
- Ward (Class-II)
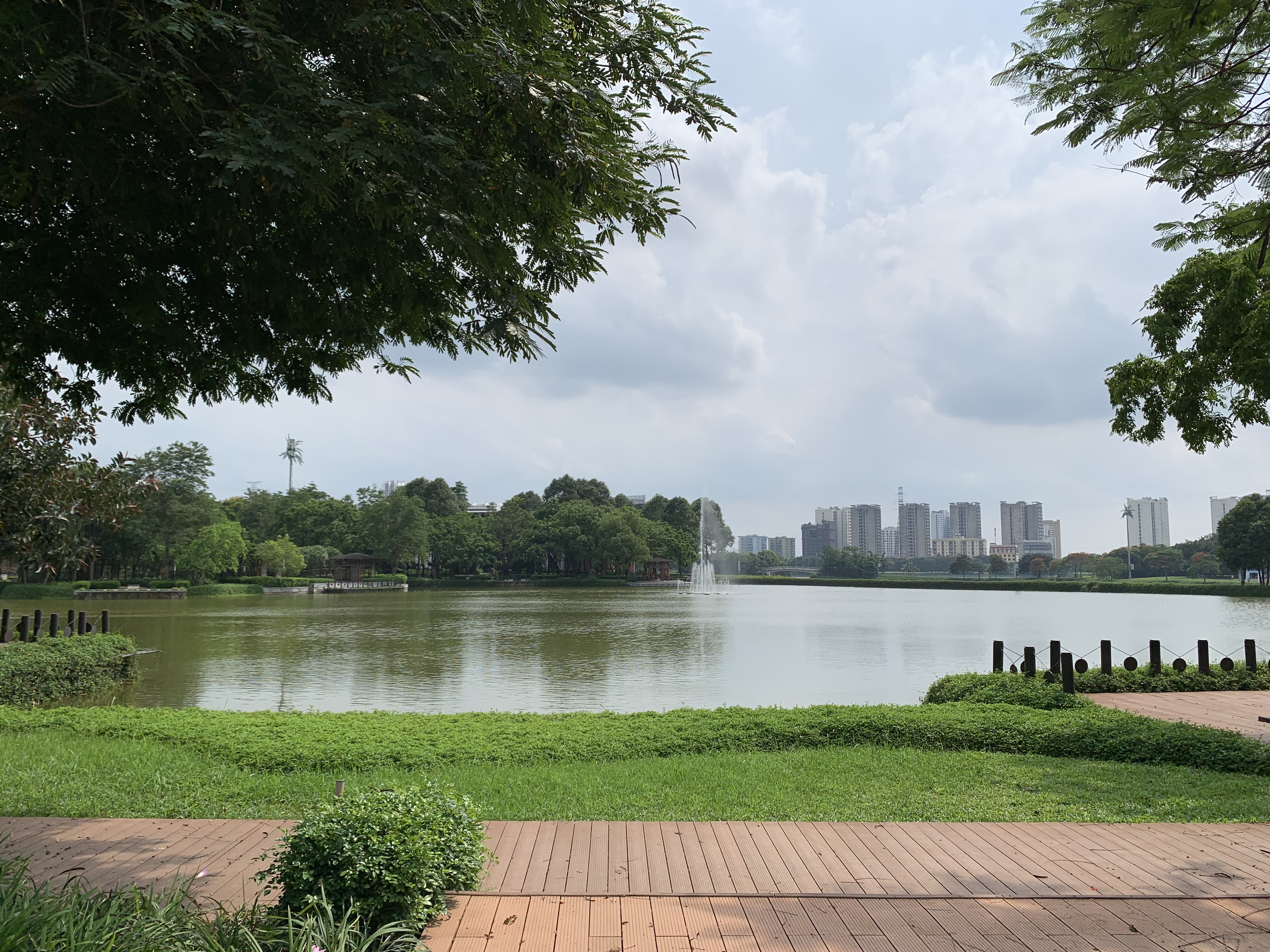
- View of the Yên Sở Lake Park.
- Interactive map of Hoàng Mai Ward
- Location within Vietnam
- Coordinates: 21°02′20″N 105°45′58″E
- Country: Vietnam
- Region: Red River Delta
- Municipality: Hà Nội
- Establishment: 18th century (commune); 1954 (urban district); 19 April 2025 (ward)
- Central hall: No.8, 6th Lane, Bùi Huy Bích Street, Hoàng Mai Ward

Government
  - Type: Ward-level authority
  - People Committee's Chairman: Nguyễn Văn Đức
  - People Council's chairman: Lê Quang Vũ
  - Front Committee's chairman: Dương Văn Hòa
  - Party Committee's Secretary: Nguyễn Kiến Thuận

Area
  - Total: 8.73 km^{2} (3.37 sq mi)

Population (2025)
  - Total: 88,519
  - Density: 10,100/km^{2} (26,300/sq mi)
  - Ethnicities: Kinh; Tanka; Others
- Time zone: UTC+7 (Indochina Time)
- ZIP code: 10000–11700 (Note: An official code from 31 December 2023, to present.)
- Climate: Cwa
- Website: Hoangmai.Hanoi.gov.vn; Hoangmai.Hanoi.dcs.vn

Hoàng Mai [hwa̤ːŋ˨˩:maːj˧˧] is a ward of Hanoi the capital city in the Red River Delta of Vietnam.

== History ==
=== Middle Ages ===
The history of the modern area of Hoàng Mai Ward before the Mạc Dynasty was almost unknown. However, according to a number of things that have been recorded in Đại Việt sử ký toàn thư, Sơn cư tạp thuật and Tang thương ngẫu lục, the interlaced swamp system at the location has been the reason for the population density to be very low, but anyway, it has had a powerful effect to protect Đông Kinh the capital citadel from the South. (Note: Philippe Papin, Histoire de Hanoï / Lịch-sử Hà-nội (en français et vietnamien), Thế Giới Publishing House, Hanoi, Vietnam, 2020.) Because of that, although it has really existed for a long time, this residence is not yet on the list of old villages that need to be preserved by the Hà Nội City People's Committee. (Note: Vân Trai Trần Quang Đức, Ngàn năm áo mũ : Lịch sử trang phục Việt Nam giai đoạn 1009–1945, Nhà sách Nhã Nam & Nhà xuất bản Thế Giới, Hà Nội, 2013.) This area has almost only noticed because it was home to some small battles of the Mạc navy with the Trịnh forces and then the Tây Sơn forces with the Revival Lê Dynasty.

According to two books Lê quý dật sử and Lê quý kỷ sự, in the last years of the XVIII century, this area was identified as Hồng Mai Commune (xã Hồng Mai), Hồng Mai Canton (tổng Hồng Mai), Thanh Trì Rural District, Thường Tín Prefecture, belonging to Sơn Nam Thượng Garrisons, then Hà Nội Province in 1831. However, the court was completely helpless in demographic statistics by the scattered of residential clusters and too complicated terrain.

According to Đồng Khánh địa dư chí lược (1887), Hồng Mai Canton was changed as Hoàng Mai Canton (tổng Hoàng Mai) in 1847 to avoid the middle name of Emperor Nguyễn Dực Tôn. (Note: Nguyễn Phước Hồng Nhậm.)

=== 20th century ===
In the process of recombining the administrative system of the Northern Vietnam about early 1954, the government of the State of Vietnam expanded the scope of the Hanoi urban area to the Southeast side to access to National Route 1. Most of the area of former Hoàng Mai Commune was merged into the city as District VII (quận VII). That name was kept until 1961 by the new government.

=== 21st century ===
Hoàng Mai was founded as an urban district by Vietnamese government's Decree 132/2003/NĐ-CP on 6 November 2003 from 5 wards of Hai Bà Trưng and 9 communes of Thanh Trì.

The district currently has 14 wards, covering a total area of 40.32 square kilometres (15.57 sq mi). As of 2019, there were 506,347 people residing in the district, the highest of all districts in Hanoi. The district borders Thanh Trì District, Thanh Xuân District, Gia Lâm District, Long Biên District, Hai Bà Trưng District. Hoàng Mai District is divided into 14 wards : Đại Kim, Định Công, Giáp Bát, Hoàng Liệt, Hoàng Văn Thụ, Lĩnh Nam, Mai Động, Tân Mai, Thanh Trì, Thịnh Liệt, Trần Phú, Tương Mai, Vĩnh Hưng, Yên Sở.

On 19 April 2025, to realize the project to arrange and merge administrative units by the Government of Vietnam, the Hà Nội City People's Committee quickly approved a Resolution on the plan of re-arranging commune+ward-level administrative units in the whole city.

According to the political document published for the news media on 20 April, Hoàng Mai Urban District was officially dissolved. Its entire area and population have been divided into seven new wards Định Công, Hoàng Liệt, Hoàng Mai, Lĩnh Nam, Tương Mai, Vĩnh Hưng, and Yên Sở. Therefore, Hoàng Mai Ward (phường Hoàng Mai) has been established based on the merging of :

- The entire ones of two former wards Thịnh Liệt and Yên Sở.
- The small parts of eight former wards Giáp Bát, Hoàng Liệt, Hoàng Văn Thụ, Lĩnh Nam, Tân Mai, Trần Phú, Tương Mai, and Vĩnh Hưng.

This new administrative unit basically has the meaning of preserving the cultural and historical values of Hồng Mai Commune and Hoàng Mai Urban District.

== See also ==
- Định Công
- Hai Bà Trưng
- Hoàng Liệt
- Lĩnh Nam
- Thanh Xuân
- Tương Mai
- Vĩnh Hưng
- Yên Hòa
- Yên Sở
