= Viet (disambiguation) =

Viet refers to the Viet people and the Vietnamese language.

Viet may also refer to:

== People ==
- Viet Cuong (composer), American classical composer
- Viet D. Dinh, American lawyer
- Viet Nguyen, American soccer player
- Viet Pham, American chef
- Viet Thanh Nguyen, American novelist
- Viet Xuan Luong, United States Army major general

== See also ==
- Viets (disambiguation)
- Viet Hong (disambiguation)
- Viet Hung (disambiguation)
- Viet Minh
- Viet Cong
- Soviet (disambiguation)
