= Hồng Hà ward =

Hồng Hà ward or sometimes Hong Ha ward may refer to:

- Hồng Hà, a ward of Hà Nội City
- Hồng Hà, a ward of Hạ Long City
- Hồng Hà, a ward of Yên Bái City
