= Vĩnh Tuy, Hanoi =

Vĩnh Tuy
- Ward (Class-II)
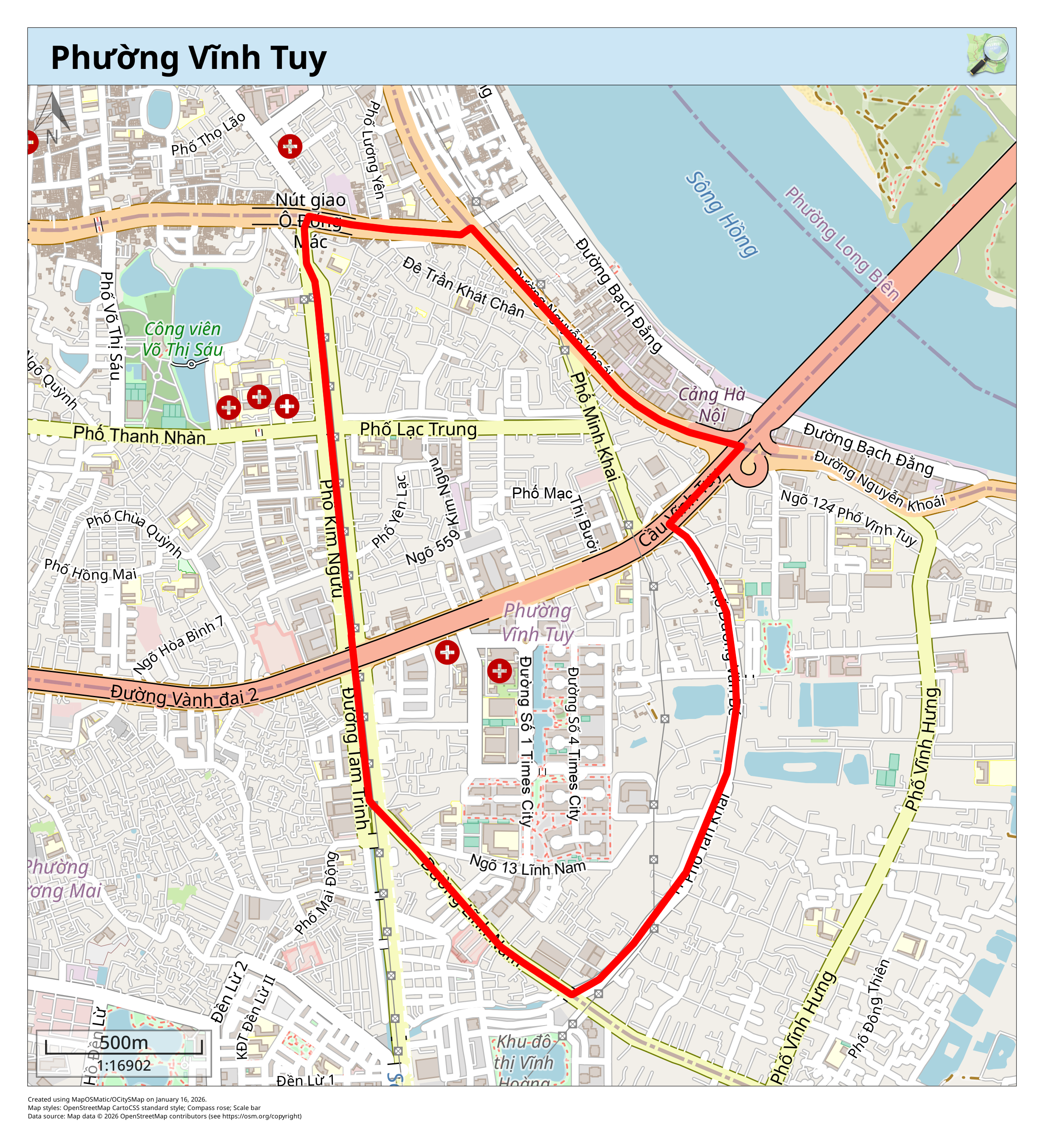
- Vĩnh Tuy map

- Location of Vĩnh Tuy in Hanoi Location in Vietnam
- Coordinates: 21°00′04″N 105°52′22″E
- Country: Vietnam
- Region: Red River Delta
- Municipality: Hanoi
- Established: 10 June 1981

Government
  - Type: Ward-level authority
  - Chairman of the People's Committee: Vũ Văn Hoạt
  - Vice Chairman of the People's Committee: Lê Bích Hằng

Area
  - Total: 2.77 km^{2} (1.07 sq mi)

Population (1 July 2025)
  - Total: 90,583
  - Density: 32,700/km^{2} (84,700/sq mi)
  - Ethnicities: Kinh
- Time zone: UTC+7 (ICT)
- Postal code: 10000–11622
- Website: Official website

Vĩnh Tuy is a ward in the city of Hanoi in the Red River Delta of Vietnam.

This is the ward in Hanoi, Vietnam that crosses the 21st parallel north.

== Geography ==
Vĩnh Tuy has the following geographical location:

- To the East, it borders Vĩnh Hưng (boundary follows Vĩnh Tuy Bridge - Dương Văn Bé Street - Tân Khai Street)
- To the West, it borders Tương Mai, Bạch Mai (boundary follows Kim Ngưu River - Tam Trinh Road)
- To the South, it borders Tương Mai (boundary follows Lĩnh Nam Road)
- To the North, it borders Hai Bà Trưng and Hồng Hà (boundary follows Trần Khát Chân Road - Nguyễn Khoái Embankment)

== History ==
This area was originally Vĩnh Tuy Trang. In 1740, King Lê Hiển Tông ascended the throne and took the reign name Cảnh Hưng, so Vĩnh Hưng Trang was renamed Vĩnh Tuy commune.

On 21 December 1974, the People's Committee of Hanoi issued a decision (Note: Decision on the establishment of sub-districts within the wards of Hanoi.) on the establishment of the Vĩnh Tuy sub-district within the Hai Bà Trưng ward.

In December 1978, the Hanoi People's Committee issued a decision (Note: Decision on the reorganization of sub-districts within the wards of Hanoi.) on the reorganization of the Vĩnh Tuy sub-district in the Hai Bà Trưng neighborhood.

In 1980, the Vĩnh Tuy sub-district belonged to the Hai Bà Trưng neighborhood.

On 3 January 1981, the Government Council issued Decision No. 3-CP on unifying the names of administrative units in urban areas.

On 10 June 1981, the People's Committee of Hanoi issued a Decision (Note: Decision on renaming neighborhoods into districts and sub-districts into wards in Hanoi city.) on:

- Renaming Hai Ba Trung neighborhood to Hai Ba Trung district.
- Establishing Vinh Tuy ward within Hai Ba Trung district.

As of 31 December 2024, Vinh Tuy ward has an area of 1.60 km^{2} and a population of 46,929 people.

On 16 June 2025, The National Assembly decided to consolidate a portion of the natural area and population of the wards of Vĩnh Tuy and Thanh Lương (Hai Bà Trung), Vĩnh Hưng and Mai Động (Hoàng Mai) into a new ward called Vĩnh Tuy ward (phường Vĩnh Tuy).
