= Vĩnh Hưng, Hanoi =

Vĩnh Hưng
- Ward (Class-II)
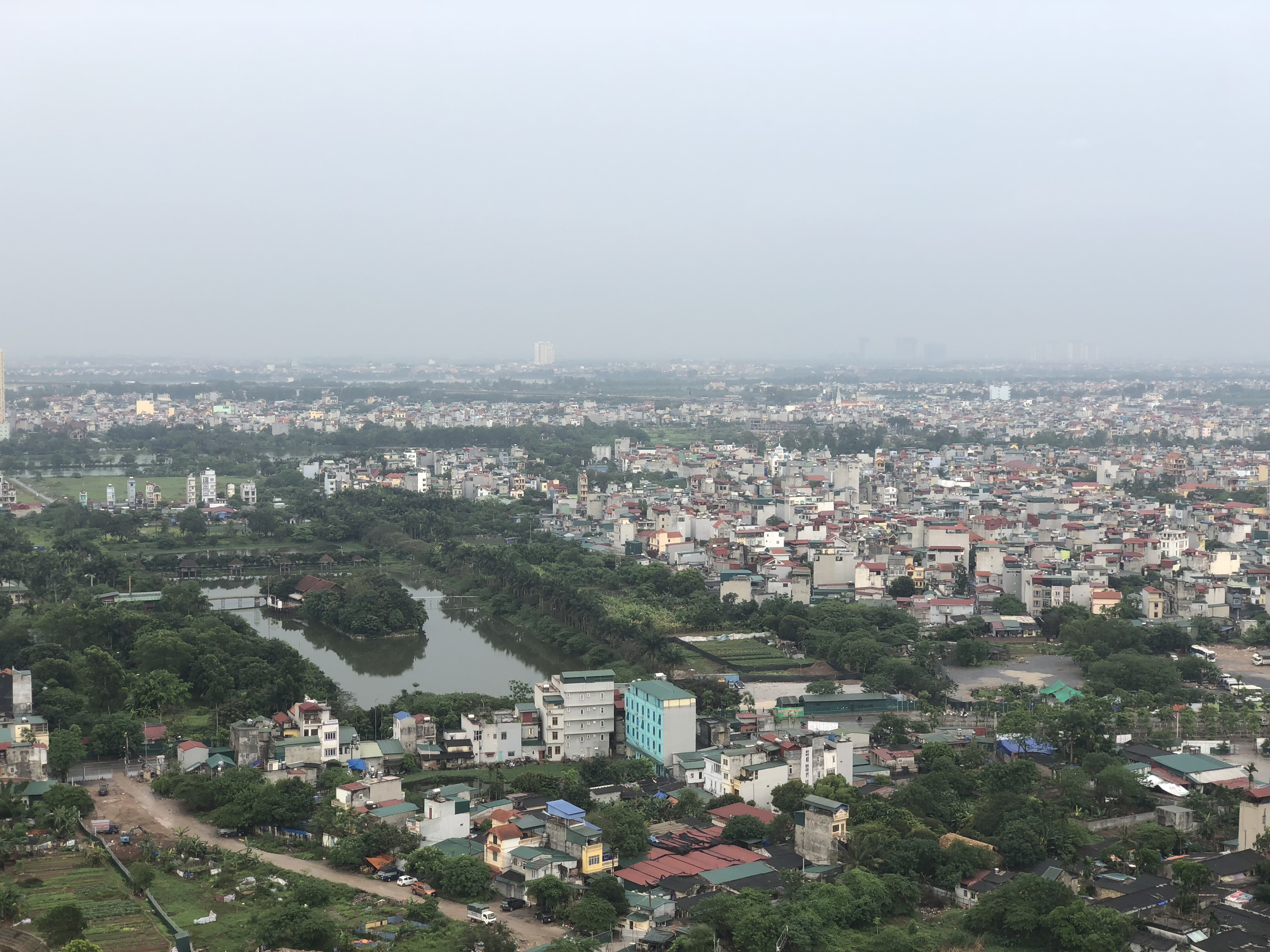
- Thanh Trì bridge

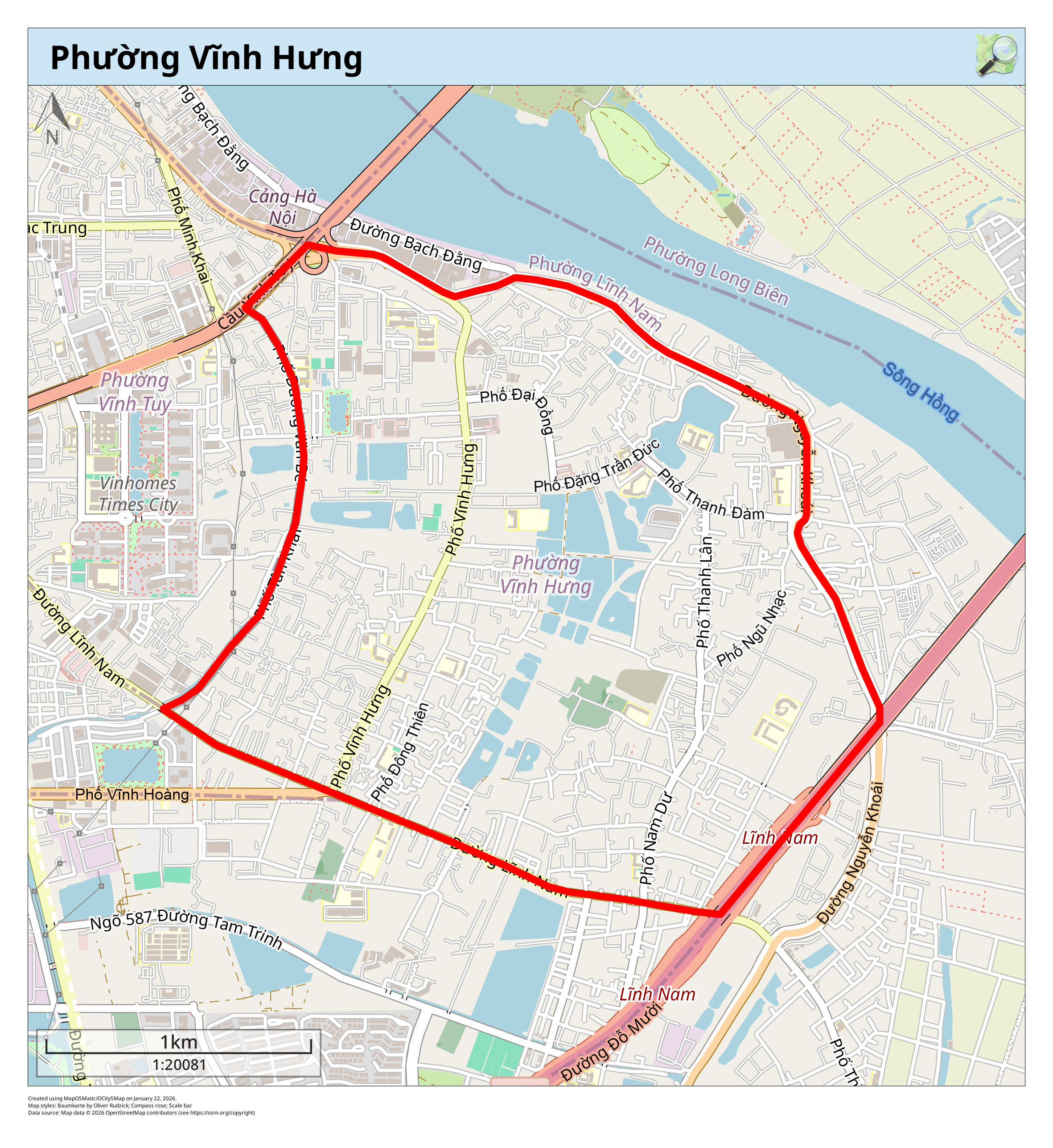
- Vĩnh Hưng map

- Location of Vĩnh Hưng in Hanoi Location in Vietnam
- Coordinates: 20°59′17″N 105°52′38″E
- Country: Vietnam
- Region: Red River Delta
- Municipality: Hanoi
- Established: 6 November 2003

Government
  - Type: Ward-level authority
  - Chairman of the People's Committee: Phạm Hải Bình
  - Vice Chairman of the People's Committee: Quán Thị Vân Anh

Area
  - Total: 4.47 km^{2} (1.73 sq mi)

Population (2025)
  - Total: 67,561
  - Density: 15,100/km^{2} (39,100/sq mi)
  - Ethnicities: Kinh
- Time zone: UTC+7 (ICT)
- Postal code: 10000–11712
- Website: Official website

Vĩnh Hưng is a ward in the city of Hanoi, Vietnam.

== History ==
This area was originally Vĩnh Hưng Trang. In 1740, King Lê Hiến Tông ascended the throne and took the reign name Cảnh Hưng, so Vĩnh Hưng Trang was renamed Vĩnh Tuy commune.

Previously, Vĩnh Tuy commune consisted of the villages of Thượng, Đoài, Tân Khai, Đông Thiên, and Trung Lập. In 1956, Trung Lập merged into Lĩnh Nam commune. In 1982, the Vĩnh Tuy Đoài area was incorporated into Hanoi's inner city to form Vĩnh Tuy ward, belonging to Hai Bà Trưng district.

On 6 November 2003, the Government issued Decree No. 132/2003/NĐ-CP. about:

- Establishment of Hoàng Mai district in Hanoi.
- Establishment of Vĩnh Hưng Ward in Hoàng Mai District based on the entire 179.65 hectares of natural area and 11,382 inhabitants of Vĩnh Tuy commune in Thanh Trì district.

As of 31 December 2024, Vinh Hung ward has an area of 1.76 km^{2} and a population of 31,239 people.

On 16 June 2025, the National Assembly decided to consolidate a portion of the natural area and population of Vĩnh Hưng, Lĩnh Nam, and Thanh Trì wards (formerly Hoàng Mai district) and a portion of Vinh Tuy ward (formerly Hai Bà Trưng district) into a new ward named Vĩnh Hưng ward.

== Geography ==
Vĩnh Hưng has the following geographical location:

- To the East, it borders Lĩnh Nam (boundary follows Nguyễn Khoái dike road)
- To the West, it borders Vĩnh Tuy and Tương Mai (boundary follows Dương Văn Bé Street - Tân Khai Street - Lĩnh Nam Road)
- To the South, it borders Hoàng Mai (boundary follows Lĩnh Nam Road)
- To the North, it borders Lĩnh Nam Ward (boundary follows Nguyễn Khoái dike road)

== Administration ==
The headquarters of the Party Committee and People's Committee of Vĩnh Hưng Ward is located at 177 Thanh Đàm Street.

== Economy ==
The economic structure of Vĩnh Hưng ward is shifting towards urbanization, from agriculture and small-scale industries to the service, trade, and real estate sectors.

The ward has a strong system of commercial centers, food and beverage services, and entertainment venues in new urban areas as well as in densely populated areas along Vĩnh Hưng, Lĩnh Nam, and Tam Trinh streets.

Most agricultural and small-scale industrial land has been converted to residential land, public infrastructure, urban areas, and high-rise apartment buildings. Only a small, scattered area remains within the old residential areas, with production activities primarily focused on self-sufficiency.

There are still some scattered mechanical, repair, and garment manufacturing facilities within the ward.

== Society ==
=== Education ===
Schools in the ward include Vinh Hung Primary and Secondary School, Thanh Trì Primary and Secondary School, Vĩnh Tuy Primary and Secondary School, and Lĩnh Nam Primary and Secondary School.

Higher education institutions include Hanoi Open University and Hanoi University of Business and Technology.

== Culture ==
Vĩnh Hưng has a pagoda, Đông Thiên Pagoda, which was recognized as a National Historical Monument in 1990.

The ward organizes a traditional village festival from 30 February to 2 February in the lunar calendar, associated with the worship of Thánh Nha Cát Đại Vương - the village's tutelary deity. The festival includes processions and traditional ceremonies. In addition, there are folk games such as chess, chicken fighting, carousel, pot smashing, and Quan họ singing, as well as performances of excerpts from Chèo opera.
