= Viet Hung =

Viet Hung may refer to several places in Vietnam, including:

== Việt Hùng ==
- Việt Hùng, Hanoi, a commune of Đông Anh District
- Việt Hùng, Bắc Ninh, a commune of Quế Võ District
- Việt Hùng, Nam Định, a commune of Trực Ninh District
- Việt Hùng, Thái Bình, a commune of Vũ Thư District

== Việt Hưng ==
- Việt Hưng, Hanoi, a ward of Long Biên District
- Việt Hưng, Quảng Ninh, a ward of Hạ Long
- Việt Hưng, Hải Dương, a commune of Kim Thành District
- Việt Hưng, Hưng Yên, a commune of Văn Lâm District
