= Thanh Trì =

- Commune
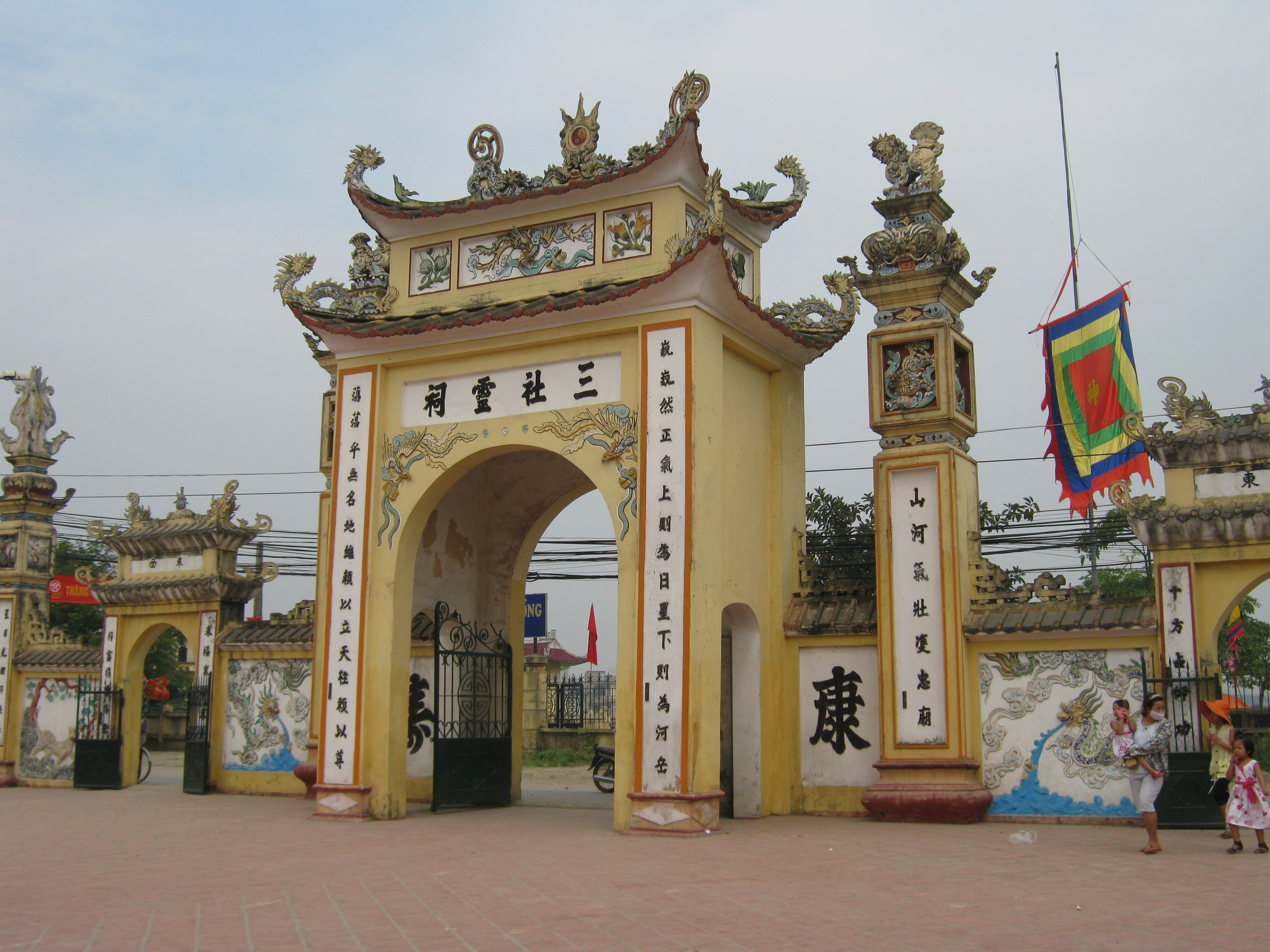
- Đình Ba Dân
- Interactive map of Thanh Trì
- Coordinates: 20.945041627025343°N 105.84549008465572°E
- Country: Vietnam
- Region: Red River Delta
- Municipality: Hanoi
- Administrative headquarters: No. 12 Nguyễn Bặc Street

Area
  - Total: 10.15 km^{2} (3.92 sq mi)

Population (2025)
  - Total: 55,378
  - Density: 5,456/km^{2} (14,130/sq mi)
- Website: thanhtri.hanoi.gov.vn

Thanh Trì is a commune in the municipality of Hanoi, Vietnam.

On 16 June 2025, district-level administrative units nationwide ceased to operate.

On the same date, the Standing Committee of the National Assembly of Vietnam issued Resolution No. 1656/NQ-UBTVQH15 on the arrangement of commune-level administrative units in Hanoi in 2025. Under the resolution, parts of the area and population of Văn Điển township, Ngũ Hiệp Commune, and Vĩnh Quỳnh Commune, the entire population and part of the area of Yên Mỹ Commune, part of the area of Duyên Hà Commune, the remaining area of Tứ Hiệp Commune, formerly part of Thanh Trì district, and the remaining area of Yên Sở Ward, formerly part of Hoàng Mai district, were merged to form a new commune named Thanh Trì.
