= Vinhomes Times City =

Urban complex in Hanoi

Vinhomes Times City Khu đô thị Times City Hà Nội Thành phố Thời đại Eco City (Thành phố Sinh thái)
- New town
- Vinhomes Times City central square
- Interactive map of Vinhomes Times City
- Country: Vietnam
- Centrally-governed city: Hanoi
- Ward: Vĩnh Tuy

Area
  - Total: 0.36 km^{2} (0.14 sq mi)

Population
  - Estimate: 35,000
- Website: Vinhomes Times City

Vinhomes Times City, commonly referred to as Times City, is an urban complex in Hanoi invested by Vingroup, with a total ground area of 360,367 to 360,500 sqm, total floor area of about 2,181,298 m2 to 2,205,595 m² commenced construction in 2011, with total estimated investment capital of 23,883 billion to 30,308 billion đồng. Times City includes many functional subdivisions: apartments, Vincom Mega Mall Times City, Century Office Tower, VinMec Times City Hospital, Vinschools Time City (kindergarten to high school), parks, lakes, swimming pools, aquariums, squares with featured water music.

== Location ==
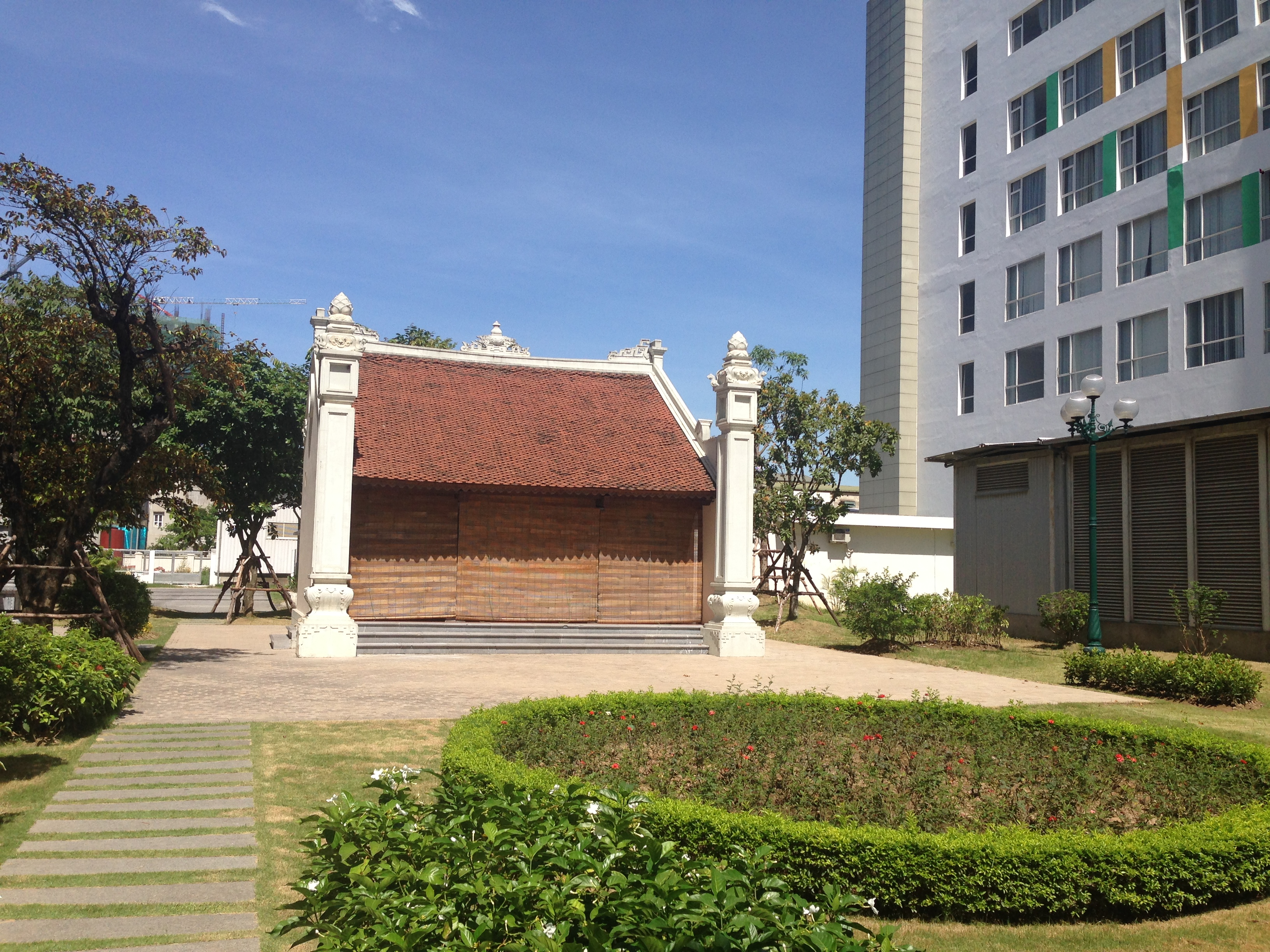
Am Tụ Linh

Vinhomes Times City address is 458 Minh Khai Street and No. 25 Alley 13 Lĩnh Nam Road, Vĩnh Tuy, Hanoi, former site of the 8/3 (August 3rd) and Hanosimex textile factories., situated at the end of Alley 13 Lĩnh Nam Road (near Alley 622 Minh Khai Street), the 31-story Sunshine Garden apartment project is bordered to the north by Hòa Bình Green City and the Imperia Minh Khai complex; to the west by the University of Economics – Technology for Industries (UNETI); 456 Minh Khai) and the Green Pearl 378 Minh Khai project; and to the east by Đồng Xuân Knitting One Member Co., Ltd. (524 Minh Khai) and Hanoi University of Business and Technology (HUBT; No. 29A Alley 124, Vĩnh Tuy Street). To the south lies the New Horizon City project, developed by a joint venture between Việt Hà Investment One Member Limited Liability Company (Việt Hà) and Vietnam Construction and Engineering Joint Stock Company (Vinaenco).

This tract of land formerly belonged to the villages of Vĩnh Tuy Đoài and Vĩnh Tuy Sở during the Lê Dynasty. At that time, the Kim Ngưu River flowed in an arc through Lạc Trung and Vĩnh Tuy Đoài, then curved westward to merge with the Lừ River at Lừ Temple before continuing downstream to Yên Duyên; this section was also known as the Gạo River. The Vĩnh Tuy Đoài Communal House, which honors Nhã Cát Đại Vương of Champa and Princess Nguyệt Nga (Chinh Thiên Phu Nhân), is still located here.

=== Public transit access ===
In 2013, bus routes to and from this area included routes 19, 24 (route 26 only runs between Nguyen Tam Trinh and Dai La, route 36 only runs between Kim Nguu and Truong Dinh, route 38 only runs between Bach Mai and Tam Trinh), 51, 52 (A and B), (route 55 and 204 only run between Nguyen Khoai and Minh Khai slope), and 205. Route 45 (Times City – Nam Thang Long Parking Lot) began picking up and dropping off passengers in front of Vinmec Hospital on January 1, 2014. In July 2016, following the closure of Lương Yên Bus Station, bus routes 10B and 55 were rerouted to this location. In August 2018, an additional compressed natural gas (CNG) bus route—Route 03—was launched, serving the National Hospital for Tropical Diseases (Facility II) in Thiên Lộc commune.

== Residential area ==
Vinhomes Times City
- Khu đô thị Times City Hà Nội, Thành phố Thời Đại
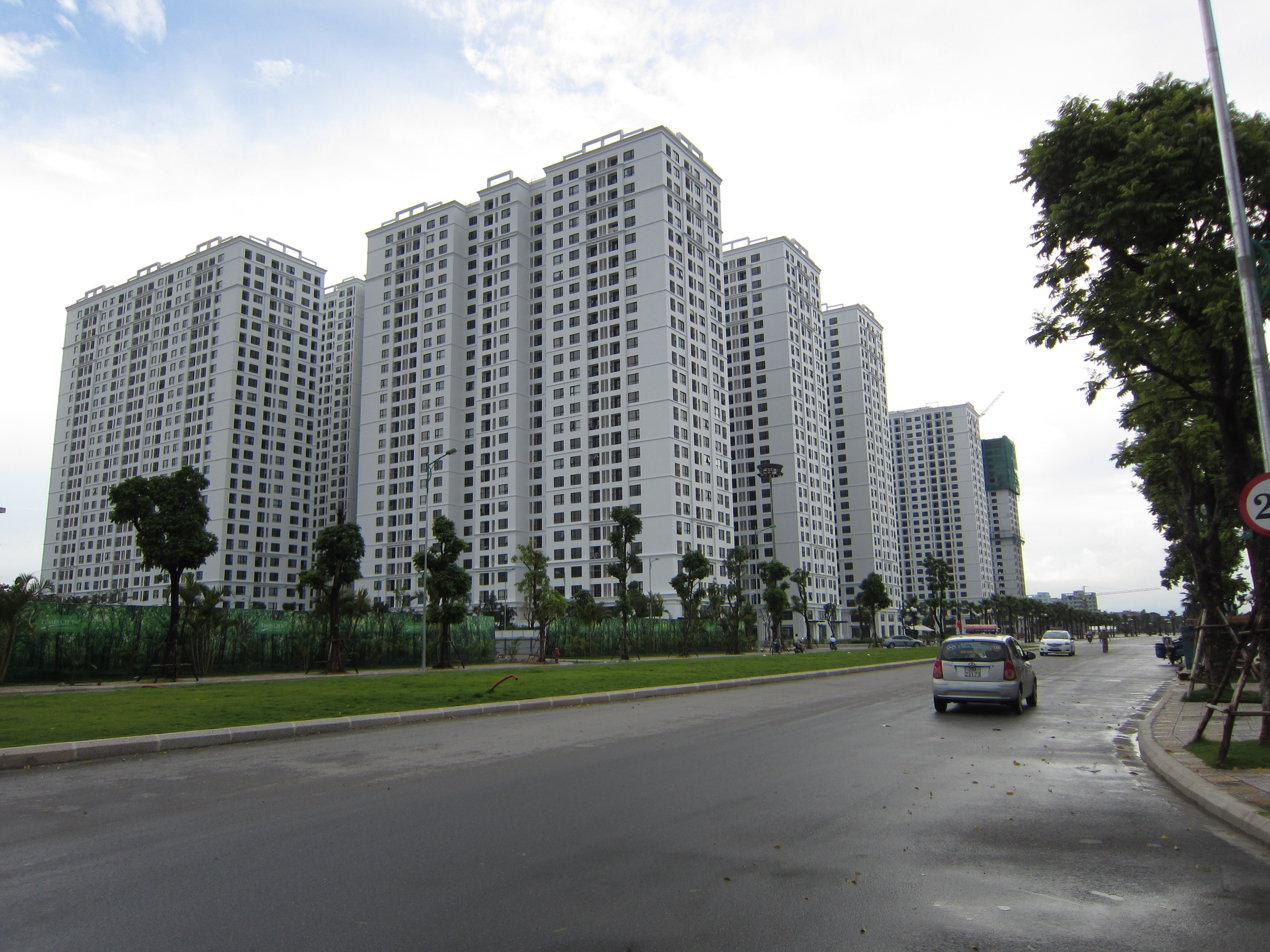
- Vinhomes Times City Apartment
- Former names: Eco City

General information
- Status: Completed
- Type: Apartment
- Architectural style: Neoclassical, modern
- Location: 458 Minh Khai Street, Vĩnh Tuy, Hanoi, Vietnam
- Construction started: January 2011
- Opened: 2013; 13 years ago

=== Vinhomes Times City Apartments ===
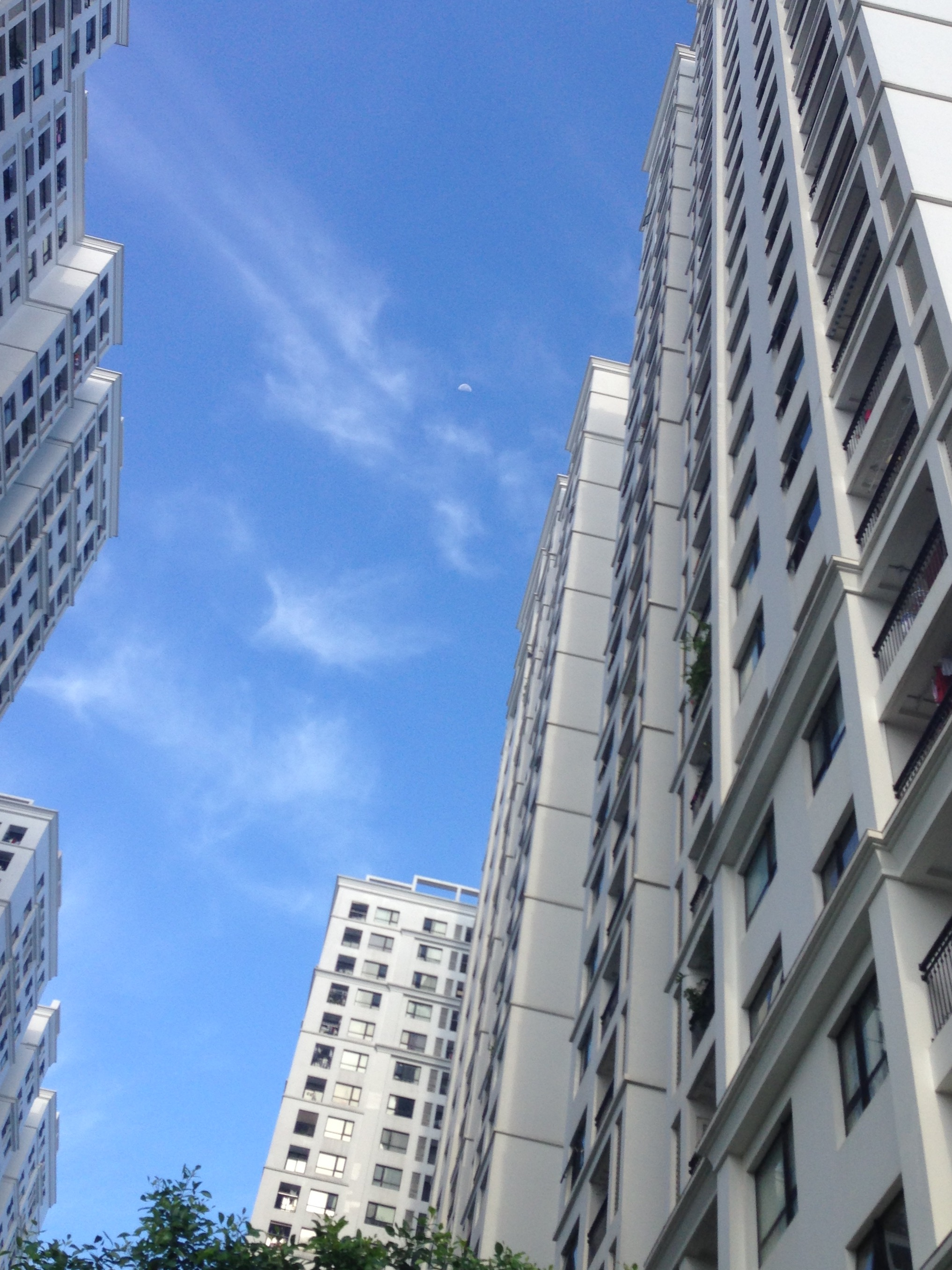
The 27-storey T1 Tower with 31-storey T2 Tower

Phase 1 of the apartment complex was completed in late 2014, comprising 12 towers–T1 through T11, plus T18. Buildings T1 through T11 each feature eight elevators and two emergency stairwells, while T18 has ten elevators and two emergency stairwells. Building T18 was later redesigned not to be in the original Vinhomes Times City section but part of the Park Hill section as Park 4 Apartment.

In early 2014, some residents raised concerns that the manufacturing operations of the adjacent Đông Xuân Knitwear One Member Company Limited (Công ty TNHH một thành viên Dệt kim Đông Xuân) were affecting their health, citing issues such as the emission of foul-smelling black smoke, textile dust, and wastewater. A decision was subsequently made to proceed with relocation.

During the apartment handover phase, facing market pressure and aiming to clear the remaining unsold inventory, Vingroup modified certain urban area designs in 2013; specifically, the company reduced the leasable area for the shopping mall in order to expand amenities for residents:

- Increased the size of common areas in each building by adding a lounge featuring café services. By the end of October 2013, several lobbies in buildings T1 through T7 had become operational and were equipped with free Wi-Fi
- Residents at Times City also receive a waiver of management fees for a period of 10 years from the time they take possession of their homes, and full scholarships at Vinschool kindergartens or primary and secondary schools, as well as comprehensive family health insurance cards at Vinmec International General Hospital
- All-season swimming pool exclusively for residents opens
- Lobby of Tower T18 rebuilt.

=== Vinhomes Times City Park Hill ===
Park Hill pedestrian bridge

Park Hill is the name of the development phase 2, comprising 7 buildings handed over in late 2016 and early 2017. The Vinhomes Times City Park Hill buildings–abbreviated as "Park"–comprise towers P1 through P8; specifically, tower T18 is located within the Park Hill complex and has been renamed as P4 (Park 4).

=== Vinhomes Times City Park Hill Premium ===
Park Hill Premium is the name of Vinhomes Times City Phase 3 with four of 34-storey towers. Including two basements and shophouse at the first two levels. In addition, Vinhomes Times City Park Hill features an outdoor swimming pool accessible to residents of Vinhomes Times City, Park Hill, and Park Hill Premium. Notably, the 34th floor of Park 10 houses a Japanese-style garden offering panoramic views of Vĩnh Tuy Ward. Park Hill Premium also offers the option of smart apartments.

=== The Boutique ===
The Boutique section is a row of 10 adjacent houses serving as a shophouse zone within the Vinhomes Times City complex in 2016.

== Vincom Mega Mall Times City ==
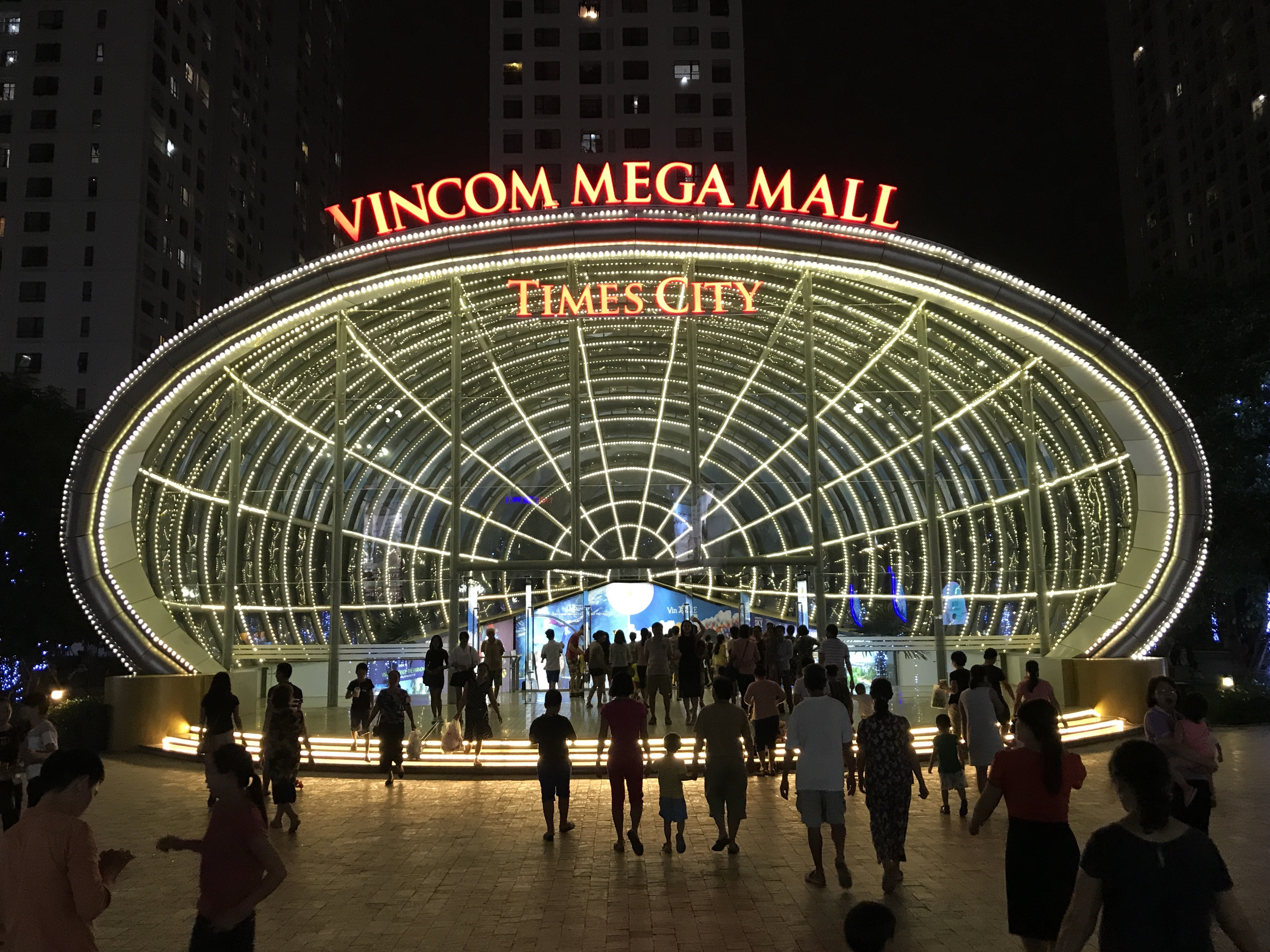
Vincom Mega Mall Times City main entrance

Vincom Mega Mall Times City is an underground shopping mall located on the B1 basement level of the 11 apartment buildings from T1 to T11 towers in the urban complex (B2 and B3 are for parking area). The main entrance is located in the Times City central square, while the other 10 entrances are located in the commercial lobbies of all the apartment buildings (excluding T5), website at Vincom Mega Mall Times City. This underground shopping mall covers approximately 230,000 sqm (some sources state that it is about 200,000 sqm) and has 11 entrances. Vinhomes Mega Mall Times City is currently the second large shopping center in Vietnam and was nominated for “Best Retail Development” at the Asia-Pacific Property Awards in 2015.

Vincom Mega Mall Times City product categories of the shopping mall and some prominent brands include:

- Fashion, Accessories & Shoes: Adidas Originals, Aldo, Charles & Keith, Converse, Coway, Crocs, ECCO Fila, Giordano, G2000, H&M, Levi's, Nike, Pierre Cardin, Pedro, Samsonite, Vascara,
- Jewelry: PNJ, Doji, Casio Watch, Galle Watch
- Cosmetics: The Face Shop, Yves Rocher
- Electronics: Oppo, Remax, VinFast, Garmin
- Entertainment & Wellness: CGV Cinema, VinKE & Vinpearl Aquarium, Speedbowl, Rocket Billiard Club, Photo Razzle Dazzle, Life4cuts Photobooth, Lucifer Fitness, Tân Việt Bookstore
- Food & Beverage (F&B) with nearly 100 restaurants, serving a variety of dishes from Asian to European cuisine, hot pot, BBQ and fast food: Al Fresco’s, Nét Huế, Roll House, Roll Story, Manwah Taiwanese Hotpot, Thai Express, King BBQ Buffet, Gogi House, Haidilao, The Pizza Company, Pizza Hut, Sushi Gourmet, Kichi-Kichi, Hotpot Story, Lotteria, Popeyes, KFC, Mixue Ice Cream & Tea, Dairy Queen, Tràng Tiền Ice Cream
- Supermarket, Household Appliances & Consumer Goods: WinMart Supermarket, MINISO, Lock & Lock, Grand Bois, LIZD, KANE, Tefal, Dunlopillo

=== Gallery ===
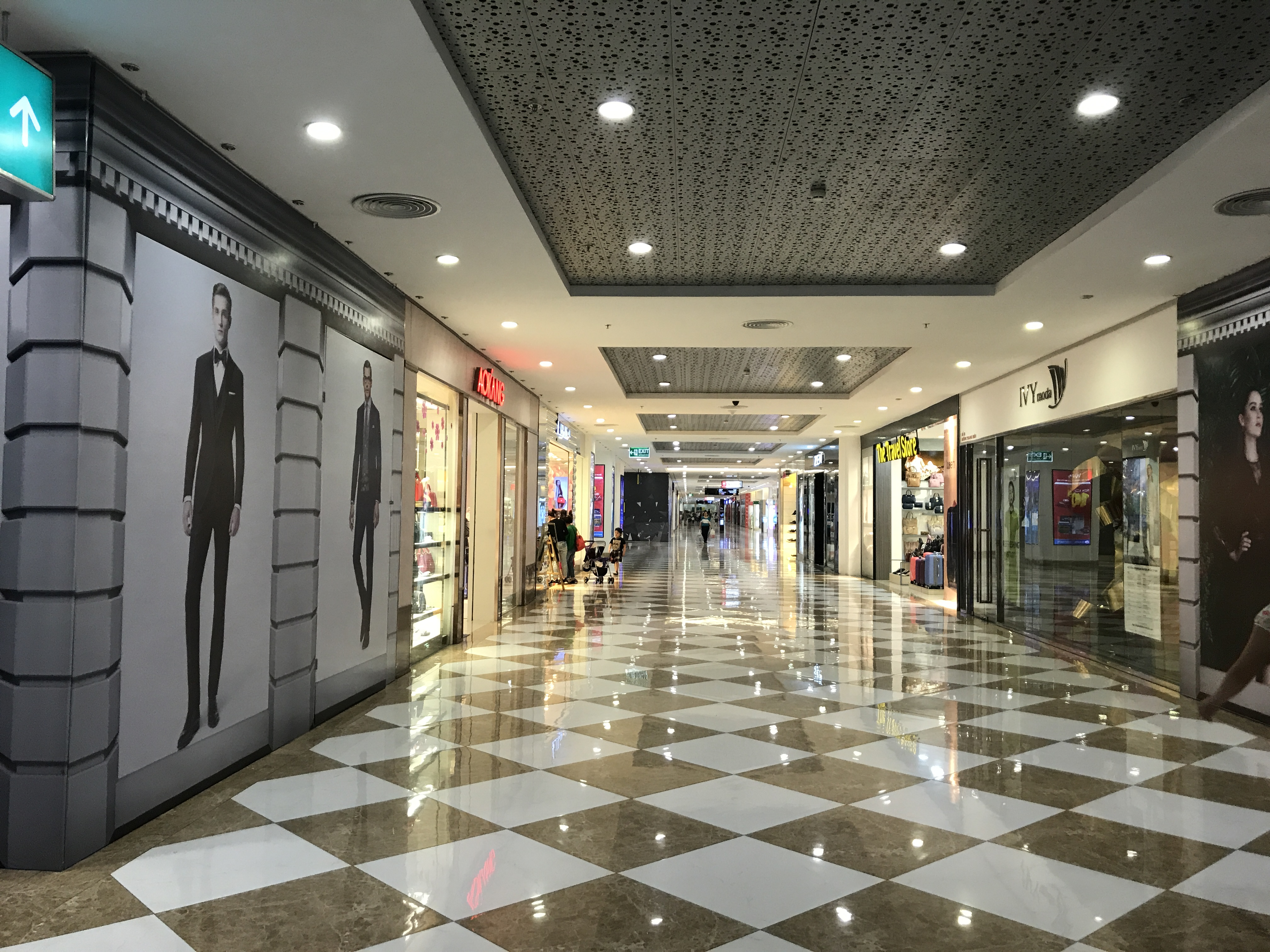
The mall walkway

VinFast showroom

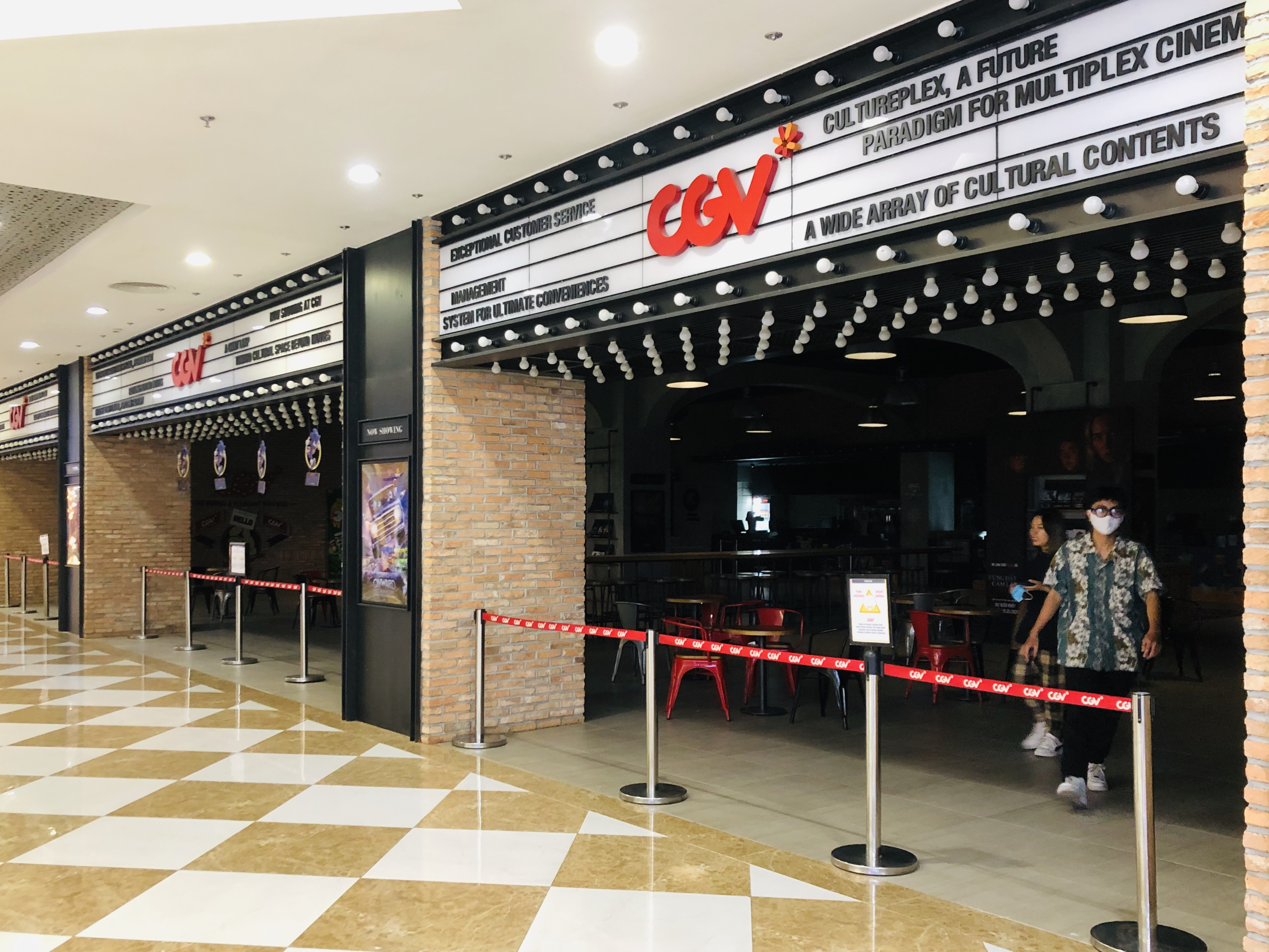
CGV Cinema during the COVID-19 lockdown in Vietnam

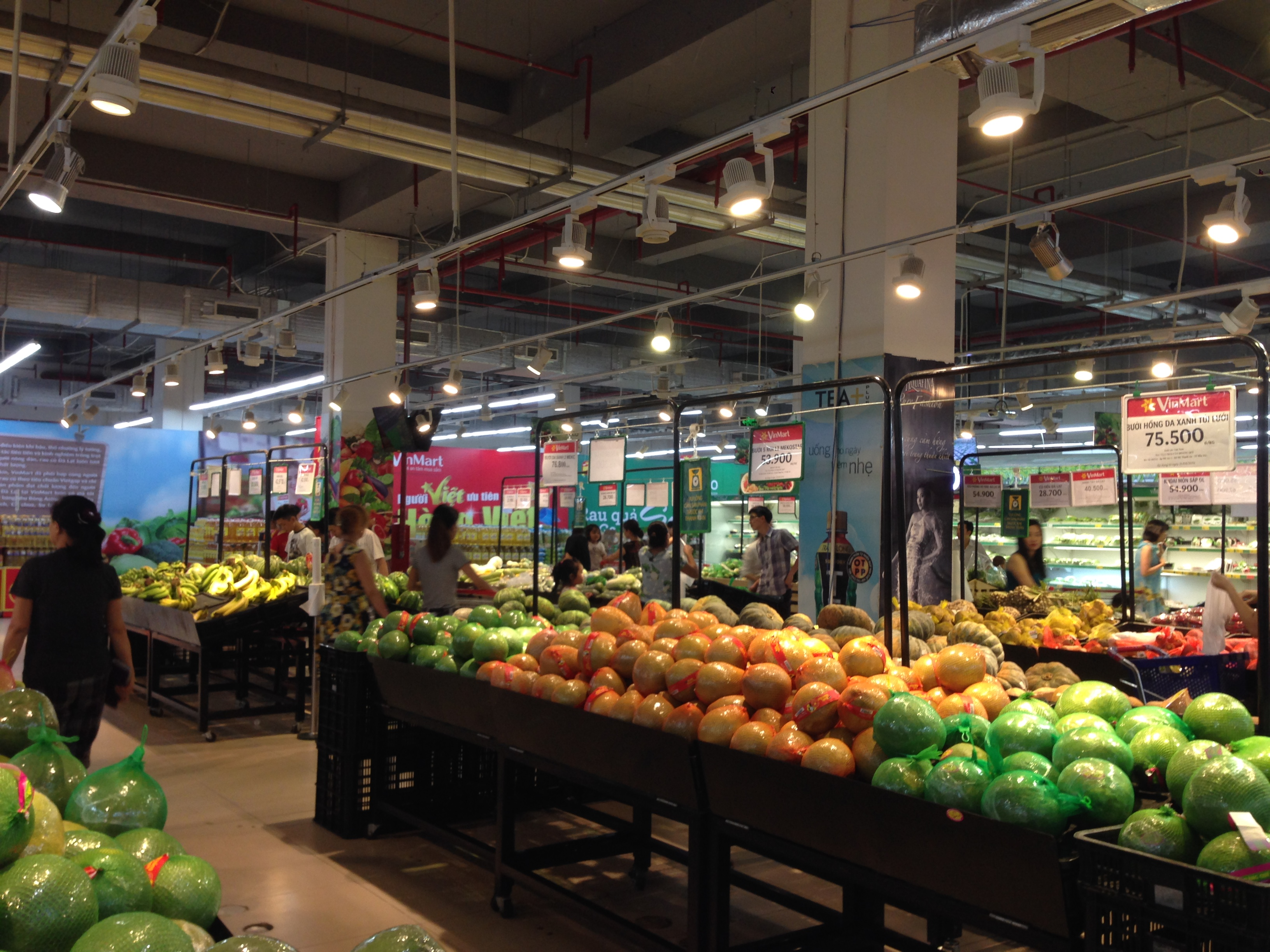
WinMart Times City

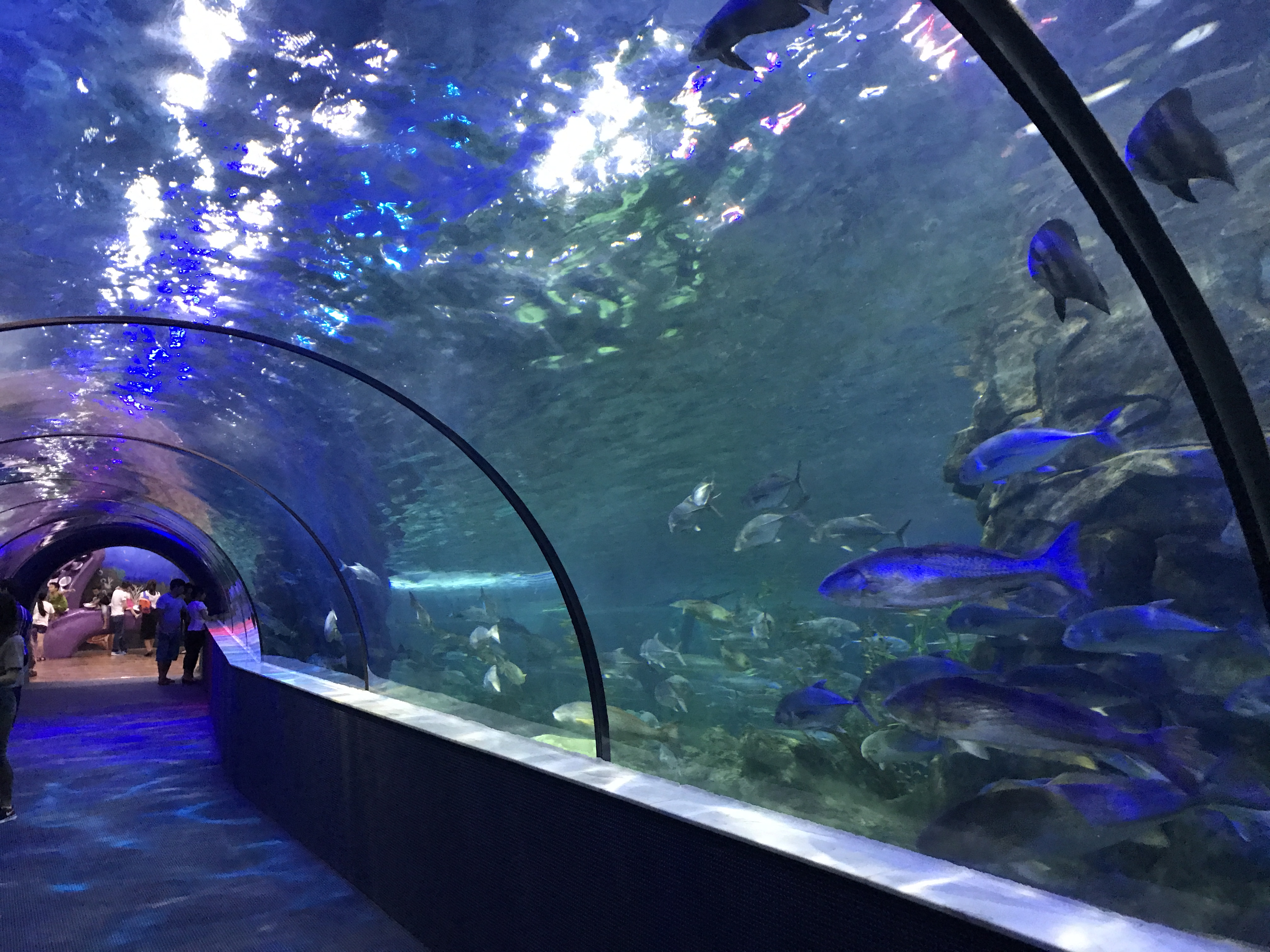
Vinpearl Aquarium Times City

== Office buildings ==
Tower 2 Times City, now One Mount Building

Vinhomes Times City has 3 office buildings, the first 2 buildings are named Tower 1 and 2 Times City and Century Tower. All of them located at the development entrance gate on Minh Khai Street.

=== Tower 1 Times City ===
Tower 1 Times City pperated from 2015 with 5 above-ground floors and 1 basement, it main tenants are ILA English Center, Vietcombank and MB Bank.

=== Tower 2 Times City ===
Tower 2 Times City was used as the office of VinCommerce's adayroi.com, a former e-commerce retail area was shut down in 2019 of Vingroup subsidiary. The Tower 2 was then occupied by One Mount Group and renamed as One Mount Building, originally a subsidiary of Vingroup, established in late 2019. However, in March 2022, Vingroup announced the transfer of a portion of its ownership, thereby ceasing to be the parent company of One Mount Group.

=== Century Tower ===
Century Tower

Century Tower, initially known as T14 Tower, is an office building launched by Vinhomes and officially put into operation from September 2020. The tower has 25 above-ground floors and the height of 99 m (325 ft) and GFA is 63,884 square metres (687,640 sq ft). It is next to The Tower 1 Times City. Notable office tenants here are Chubb Limited, VIB, Shinhan Bank, BIDV along with some retail tenants are: McDonald's, Trung Nguyên Legend Café, GS25.

== External link ==
- Official website
