= Hồng Hà, Hanoi =

Hồng Hà Ward Phường Hồng Hà Làng Tứ Tổng
- Ward (Class-II)
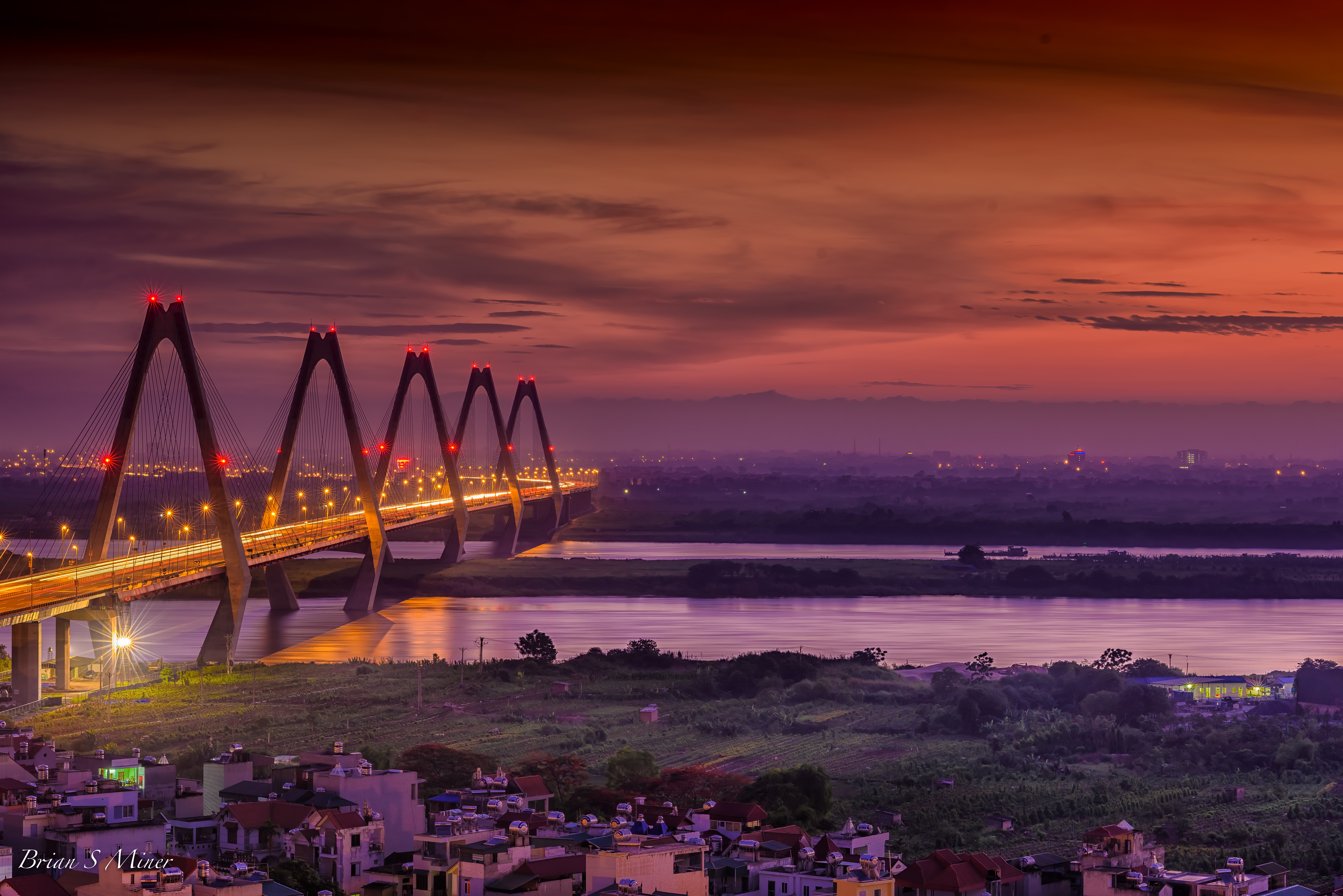
- Nhật Tân Bridge at dawn.
- Nicknames: "Floating Street" (Phố Nổi) "The Wharf" (Bãi Giữa)
- Interactive map of Hồng Hà Ward
- Location within Vietnam
- Country: Vietnam
- Region: Red River Delta
- Municipality: Hà Nội
- Establishment: 1010 (village); 1954 (commune); April 19, 2025 (ward)
- Central hall: No. A8, Block B6, Đầm Trấu Road, Hồng Hà Ward

Government
  - Type: Ward-level authority
  - People Committee's Chairman: Lê Hồng Thắng
  - People Council's chairman: Bùi Tuấn Anh
  - Front Committee's chairman: Hoàng Thanh Tùng
  - Party Committee's Secretary: Bùi Tuấn Anh

Area
  - Total: 16.61 km^{2} (6.41 sq mi)

Population (2025)
  - Total: 126,062
  - Density: 7,590/km^{2} (19,660/sq mi)
  - Ethnicities: Kinh; Tanka; Others
- Time zone: UTC+7 (Indochina Time)
- Climate: Cwa
- Website: Hongha.Hanoi.gov.vn; Hongha.Hanoi.dcs.vn

Hồng Hà [hə̤wŋ˨˩:ha̤ː˨˩] is a ward of Hà Nội the capital city in the Red River Delta of Vietnam.

== History ==
Its name Hồng Hà (紅河) is originally the name of the Red River in Vietnamese.

=== Middle Ages ===
The modern site of Hồng Hà Ward was first known around the fifth century AD with a small site called as Long Uyên (龍淵, "dragon pond"). However, when the Đường dynasty was established in 618, it was renamed Long Biên (龍編) to avoid the real name of Emperor Cao Tổ. During the following centuries, it played a very important role as a natural barrier to protect Đông Kinh the capital citadel from the North side.

=== 20th century ===
When the Government of French Indochina began the project for improvement of the urban area in Hanoi, the natural lands on both banks of the Red River were hardly noticed, except for the construction of the Long Biên Bridge in 1902. Because of this, the area has attracted many waves of migrants from poor villages in the whole Ton-Kin after each drought or crop failure. In general, about the early 20th century, there were only three notable sites : Long Biên Bridge, Nhật Tân peach village, Yên Phụ Power Plant. In addition, at the foot of Long Biên Bridge, there was also a wasteland emerging in the middle of the Red River called Phúc Xá Wharf. However, this site was only used by some residents to grow vegetables or anchor small boats to avoid storms.

During the two months of the early 1947, Long Biên Bridge and Phúc Xá Wharf were the sites of fierce clashes between the French Far East Expeditionary Corps units and Việt Minh's guard forces, and eventually continued to witness the silent retreat of thousands of resistance fighters. (Note: Nguyễn Huy Tưởng, Sống mãi với thủ đô, Nhà xuất bản Văn Học, Hà Nội, 1961.) Soon after, the French soldiers retaliated by massacring most of the residents of Tứ Tổng commune, (Note: Later, it was divided into Ngọc Thụy ward of Long Biên urban district and Tứ Liên ward of Tây Hồ urban district.) especially the adult males.

When the government of Vietnam began to implement the perestroyka-style policy, this area was often considered by modern press to have entered a dark page in history due to many evils, which arose from the market mechanism. Vietnamese society in the 1990s was often shaken by cases involving human lives or opium drug trafficking in huge quantities coming from the place commonly known as "Long Biên bridge foot". (Note: Chân cầu Long Biên.)

=== 21st century ===
Until the early 2000s the community life in this area had a bit of a boost by two national brands, both of which came from Nhật Tân village: peach trees and dog meat. However, for a long time, many attempts by the Hanoi City People's Committee to renovate this area have almost completely failed due to corruption. That is why people often call this place "military zone", (Note: Quân khu Xóm Liều.) an old term referring to the underworld of gangsters.

On April 19, 2025, in response to the Plan to Arrange and Merge Administrative Units by the government of Vietnam, the Hanoi City People's Committee convened a conference to solicit opinions from the people and members of local administrative agencies to issue a Resolution on the new commune-ward level administrative unit system. The conference agreed on new ward-level administrative unit called Hồng Hà Ward (phường Hồng Hà), which would include all the scattered residential areas on the outer ring of the Red River dike, that is, its territory would lie almost entirely on a stretch of the river from Nhật Tân Bridge to Vĩnh Tuy Bridge. That feature makes it naturally the ward with the largest area (Note: "Siêu phường", means "super ward".) in the Hanoi Capital Area, while its population is the smallest. This unprecedented annexation included the population and natural area of small parts of five former urban districts Ba Đình, Hai Bà Trưng, Hoàn Kiếm, Long Biên, Tây Hồ. Specifically :

- Big parts of Bạch Đằng, Thanh Lương (Hai Bà Trưng district) and Nhật Tân, Tứ Liên, Yên Phụ (Tây Hồ district).
- Small parts of Bồ Đề, Ngọc Thụy (Long Biên district) and Phú Thượng, Quảng An (Tây Hồ district).

== Culture ==
The establishment of Hồng Hà Ward basically restored the administrative functions of former Tứ Tổng Commune, which has long contained many cultural and historical values of Hanoi the capital city. Following the tradition of the old village since 1947 and preserved through many changes in administrative boundaries, every spring, the Tứ Tổng residents always hold a ceremony to pay tribute to the Hồng Hà Partisan Company martyrs and common people, whom were massacred by the French army in the battle of Hanoi. (Note: Nguyễn Thế Nghiệp, Tứ Tổng, Nhà xuất bản Hồng Đức, Hà Nội, 2023.)

== See also ==
- Ba Đình
- Cửa Nam
- Gia Lâm
- Hai Bà Trưng
- Hoàn Kiếm
- Hoàng Mai
- Long Biên
- Ngọc Hà
- Tây Hồ
