= Viet Hong =

Việt Hồng may refer to several places in Vietnam:

- Việt Hồng, a commune of Lào Cai province
- Việt Hồng, Hà Giang, a former rural commune of Bắc Quang District
- Việt Hồng, Hải Dương, a former rural commune of Thanh Hà District
