= Lĩnh Nam =

- Ward
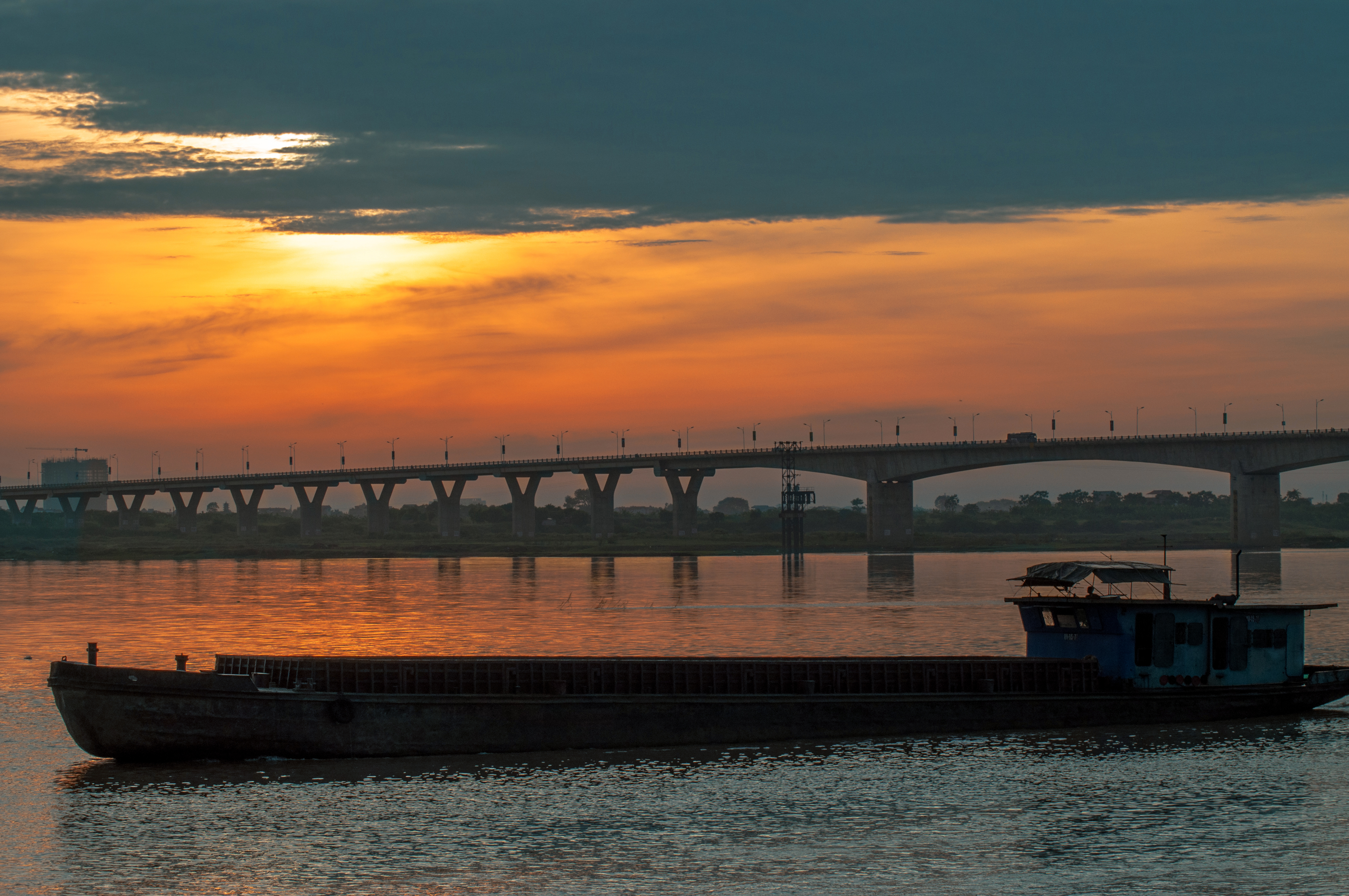
- Vĩnh Tuy Ship on the river

- Location in Vietnam Lĩnh Nam (Vietnam)
- Coordinates: 20.9813°N 105.8947°E
- Country: Vietnam
- Municipality: Hanoi

Area
  - Total: 4.19 sq mi (10.86 km^{2})

Population (2025)
  - Total: 20,706
  - Density: 4,940/sq mi (1,906/km^{2})
- Time zone: UTC+07:00 (Indochina Time)
- Area code: 00328
- Website: http://linhnam.hanoi.gov.vn/

Lĩnh Nam is a ward (phường) of Hanoi, Vietnam.

== History ==
=== Before 1976 ===
Lĩnh Nam ward was form from three old villages: Nam Dư Thượng, Thúy Lĩnh and Trung Lập. Also, Trung Lập used to belong Vĩnh Tuy commune (Now Vĩnh Hưng ward). This is an area with an early history of development, with a rich culture and long-standing population. In 1955, the three villages merged to form Lĩnh Nam ward, belonging to District VII, Hanoi.

On May 31, 1961, a new Thanh Tri district was established based on the merger of the old Thanh Tri district and the old District VII, with Linh Nam ward under Thanh Tri district.
