= Việt Hồng =

- Commune
- Interactive map of Việt Hồng
- Coordinates: 21.639382578241808°N 104.86435122768064°E
- Country: Vietnam
- Province: Lào Cai
- Region: Northwest
- Established: 1988
- Seat: Thôn 3A

Area
  - Total: 101.37 km^{2} (39.14 sq mi)

Population (2024)
  - Total: 10,802
  - Density: 106/km^{2} (270/sq mi)

Việt Hồng is a commune in Lào Cai province, Vietnam.

== History ==
On 16 June 2025, the Standing Committee of the National Assembly of Vietnam issued Resolution No. 1673/NQ-UBTVQH15 on the reorganization of commune-level administrative units in Lào Cai province in 2025. Under the resolution, the entire area and population of the former communes of Việt Cường, Vân Hội, and Việt Hồng in Trấn Yên district were consolidated to form a new commune named Việt Hồng.
