= Viets =

Viets may refer to:

- Viet people
- Mount Viets, mountain in Antarctica
- Viets' Tavern, tavern in East Granby, Connecticut
- Viets Hotel, building in Grand Forks, North Dakota
- Yue people

== People ==
- Alexander Viets Griswold (1766–1843), American Anglican bishop
- Alexander Viets Griswold Allen (1841–1908), American theologian
- Elaine Viets, American columnist and writer
- Hermann Viets, American engineer
- Richard Noyes Viets, American diplomat
