= Gia Lâm district =

Gia Lâm district Quận Gia Lâm
- Urban District
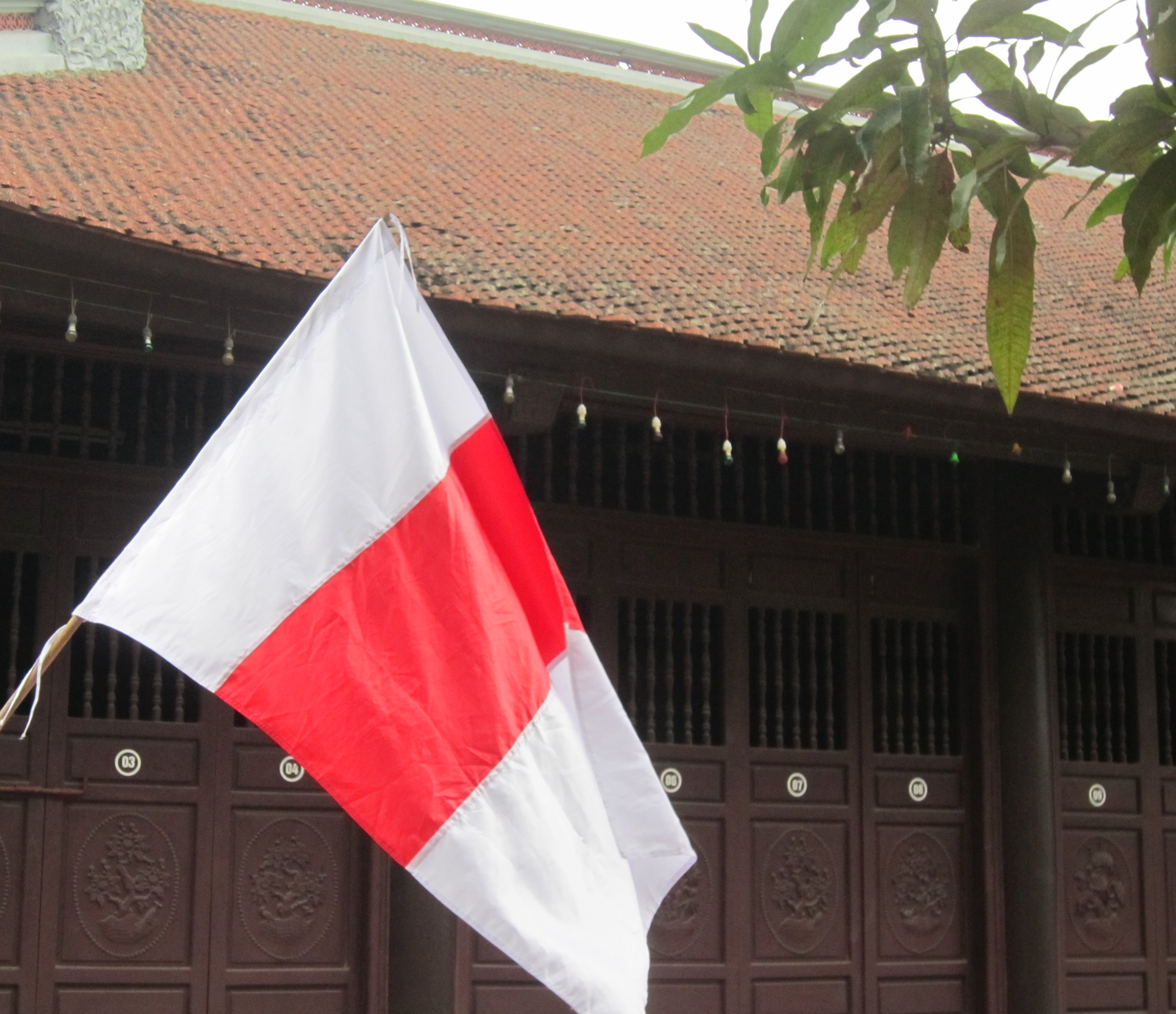
- Temple of Empress Ỷ Lan at Lunar New Year 2013.

- Location within Hanoi
- Coordinates: 21.019520°N 105.937664°E
- Country: Vietnam
- Region: Red River Delta
- Municipality: Hanoi
- Central hall: Trâu Quỳ township

Government
  - Type: Rural district
- Time zone: UTC+7 (Indochina Time)
- ZIP code: 12400

Gia Lâm is the former easternmost urban district of Hanoi, the capital city of Vietnam.

== Geography ==
Prior to 2003, the district covered the entire area of Long Biên district, which included Long Biên Bridge, Gia Lâm Airport, Gia Lâm railway station, Gia Lâm bus station and the headquarters of Vietnam Airlines. On 22 September 2023, the Hanoi People Committee approved Gia Lam to become the next urban district of Hanoi.

Gia Lâm district is bordered by Bắc Ninh province to the east and north, Đông Anh district to the northwest, Long Biên district and Hoàng Mai district to the west, Thanh Trì district and Hưng Yên province to the south.

As of 2011, the district had a population of 243,957. The district covers an area of 115 km^{2} (44 sq mi). The district capital lies at Trâu Quỳ township.

Gia Lâm district is subdivided to 22 commune-level subdivisions, including the townships of Trâu Quỳ (district capital), Yên Viên and the rural communes of: Bát Tràng, Cổ Bi, Đa Tốn, Đặng Xá, Đình Xuyên, Đông Dư, Dương Hà, Dương Quang, Dương Xá, Kiêu Kỵ, Kim Lan, Kim Sơn, Lệ Chi, Ninh Hiệp, Phù Đổng, Phú Thị, Trung Mầu, Văn Đức, Yên Thường, Yên Viên.

== Culture ==
Bát Tràng is a traditional pottery village located in Gia Lâm District. The village is famous for producing high-quality Bát Tràng Porcelain. Today, Bát Tràng Village is both a cultural heritage site and a popular tourist destination.
