= Long Biên district =

Long Biên district Quận Long Biên
- Urban district
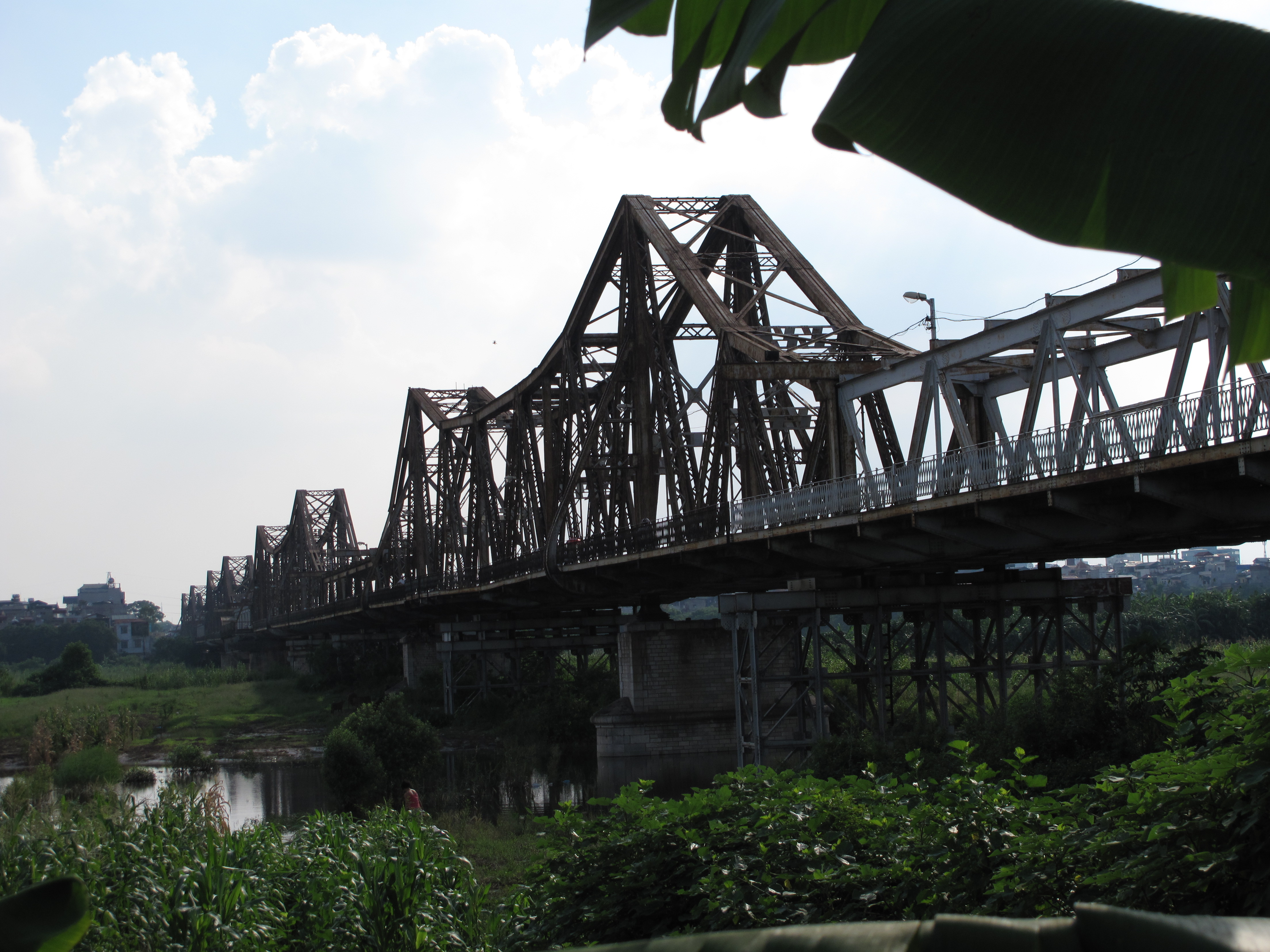
- The Long Biên Bridge

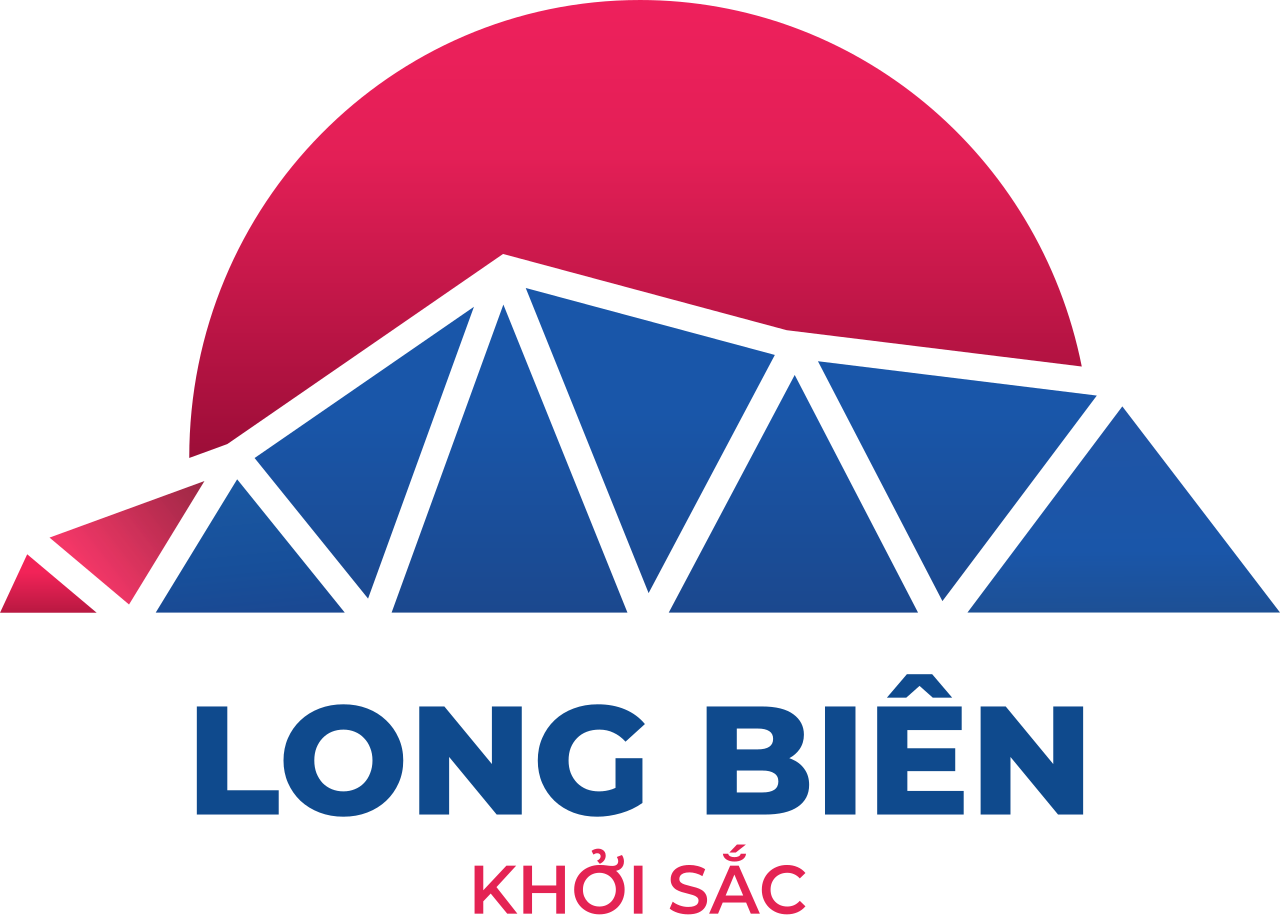
- Seal
- Interactive map of Long Biên district
- Country: Vietnam
- Province: Hanoi
- Seat: Việt Hưng ward
- Wards: 14 wards

Area
  - Total: 59.82 km^{2} (23.10 sq mi)

Population (2019)
  - Total: 322,549
  - Density: 5,392/km^{2} (13,970/sq mi)
- Time zone: UTC+7 (ICT)
- Area code: 24
- Climate: Cwa
- Website: https://longbien.hanoi.gov.vn/ (in Vietnamese)

Long Biên was a former urban district (quận) of Hanoi, the capital of Vietnam. The district currently has 14 wards, covering a total area of 59.82 square kilometres (23.10 sq mi). As of 2019, there were 322,549 people residing in the district, the population density is 5,400 inhabitants per square kilometer.

Long Biên was incorporated as an urban district in 2003 from the northwestern portion of Gia Lâm district adjacent to the city center. The district is named for the formerly separate settlement of Long Biên (Chinese: Longbian), which served as the capital of Jiaozhou and Jiaozhi in imperial China and as the capital of Lý Bí's kingdom of Vạn Xuân.

It is Hanoi's only urban district on the east side of the Red River. Main landmarks in the district include:

- Long Biên Bridge (eastern end)
- Gia Lâm Airport
- Gia Lâm station
- Gia Lâm Bus Station
- Headquarters of Vietnam Airlines the Civil Aviation Authority of Vietnam (CAAV), and VinGroup.

Gia Lâm Airport, Gia Lâm Railway Station and Gia Lâm Bus Station were named after Gia Lâm district, which formerly covered Long Biên. Several other locations in the city that have the name "Long Biên" such as Long Biên Railway Station, Long Biên Bus Terminal and Long Biên Market, however, are located on the western end of the Long Biên bridge in Hoàn Kiếm and Ba Đình districts.

== Location ==
Long Biên district is located at 21° 1′ 58.08″ N, 105° 54′ 47.88″ E, in Hanoi. It is surrounded by Tây Hồ district, Gia Lâm district, Ba Đình district, Hoàn Kiếm district, Hai Bà Trưng district, Hoàng Mai district, Đông Anh district.

== Administrative divisions ==
Long Biên district is divided into 14 wards (Bồ Đề, Cự Khối, Đức Giang, Gia Thụy, Giang Biên, Long Biên, Ngọc Lâm, Ngọc Thụy, Phúc Đồng, Phúc Lợi, Sài Đồng, Thạch Bàn, Thượng Thanh, Việt Hưng).
