= Hai Bà Trưng district =

Coordinates: 21°00′42″N 105°50′52″E

Hai Bà Trưng district Quận Hai Bà Trưng
- Urban district
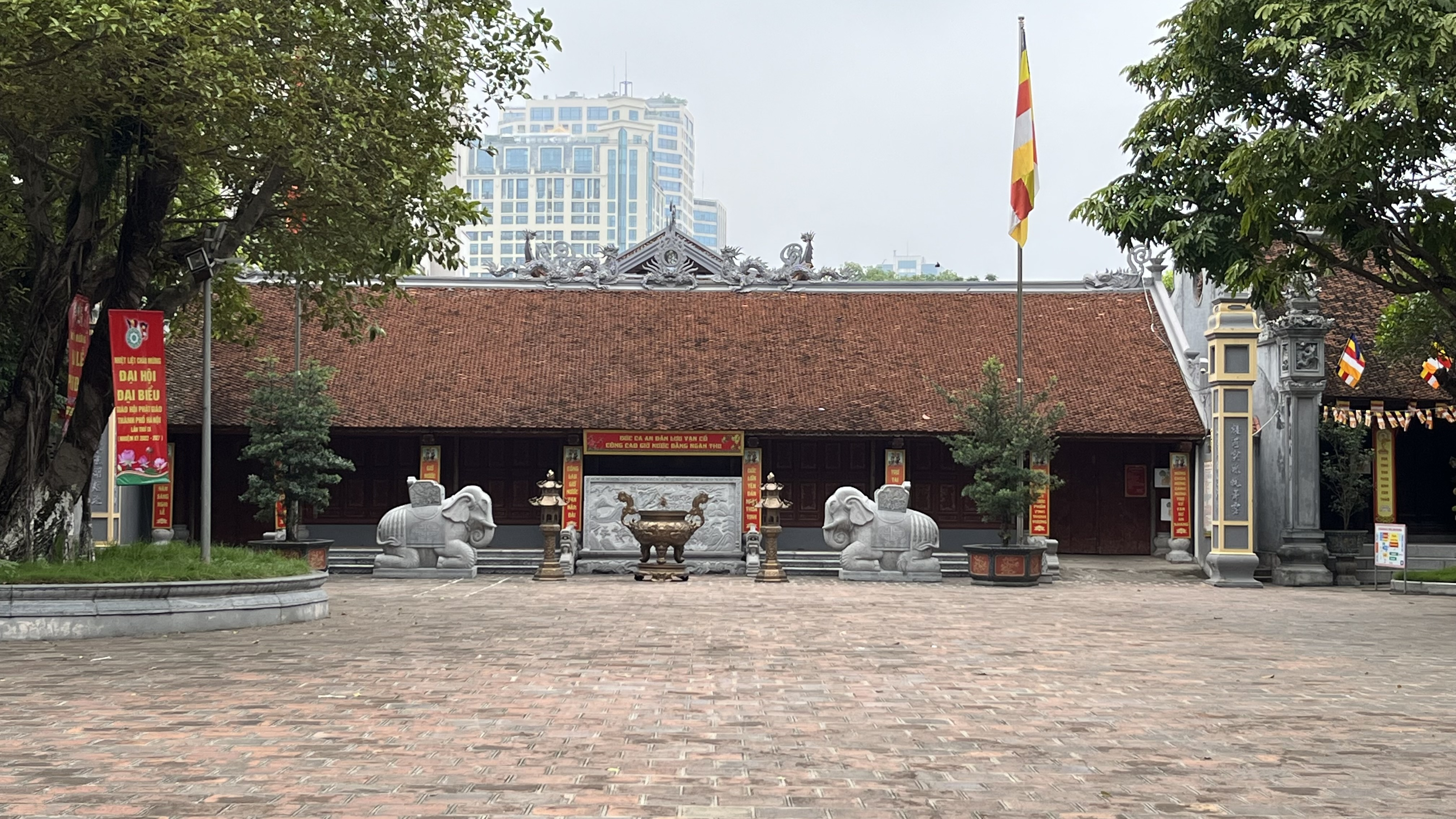
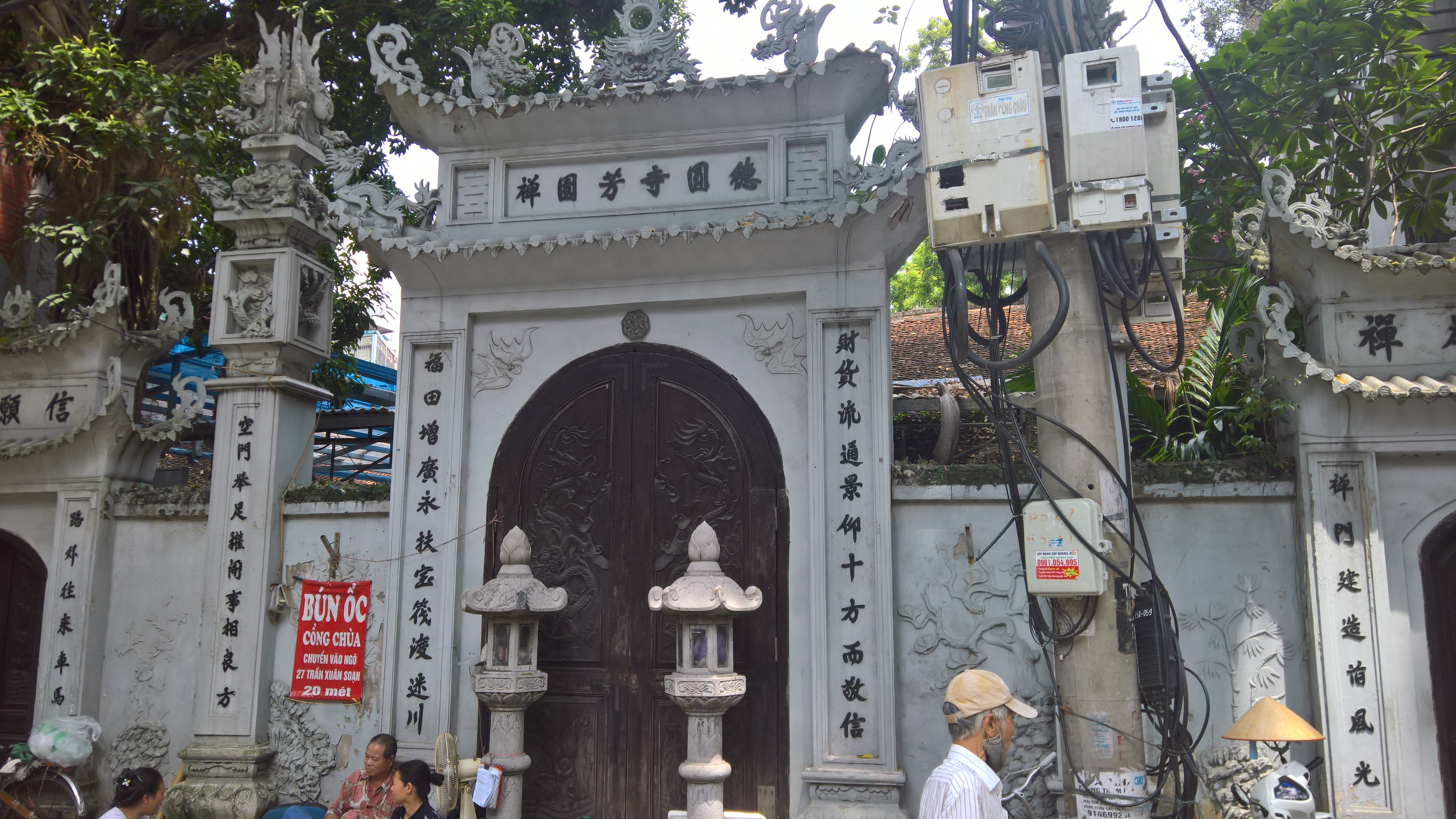
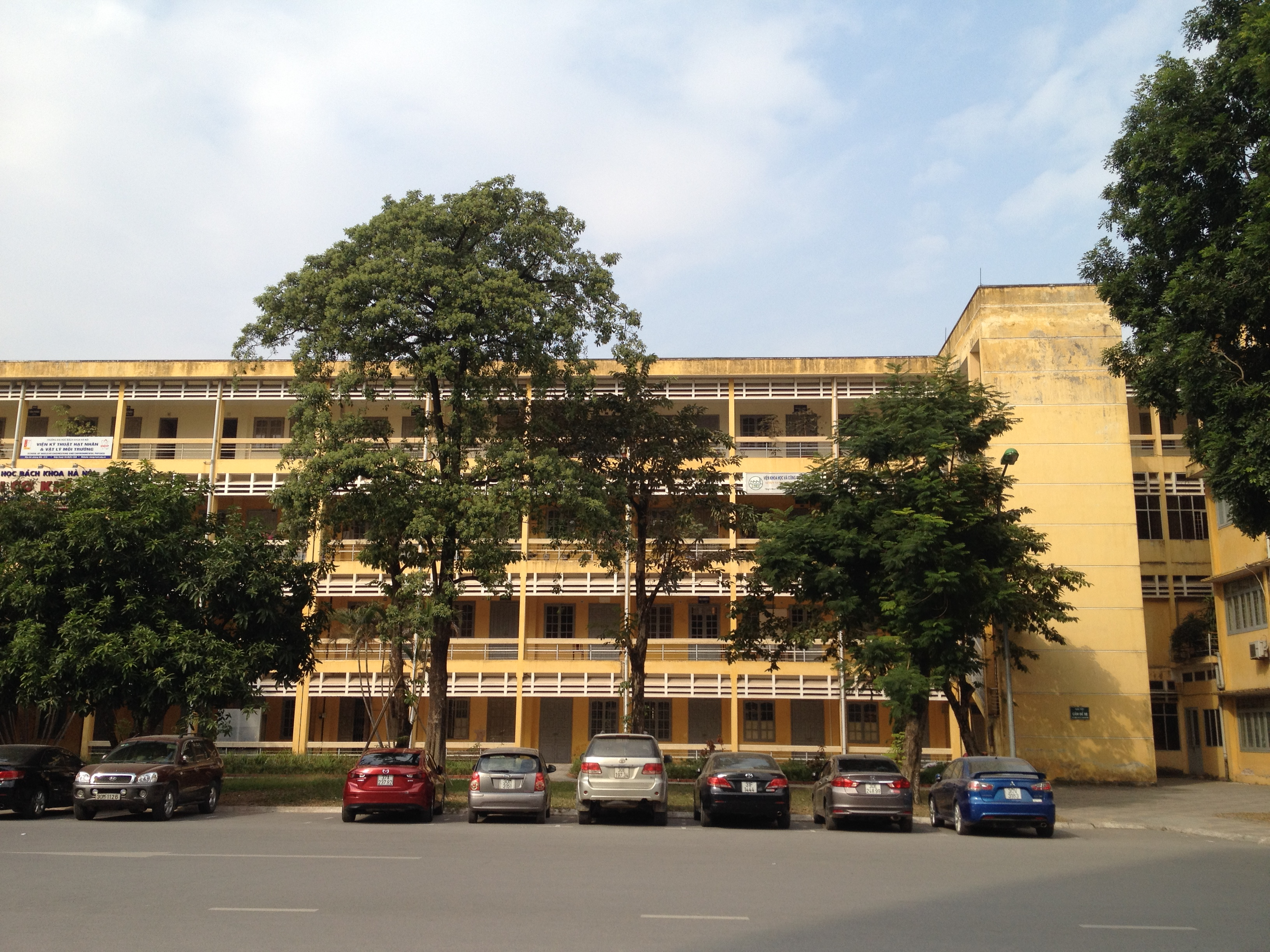
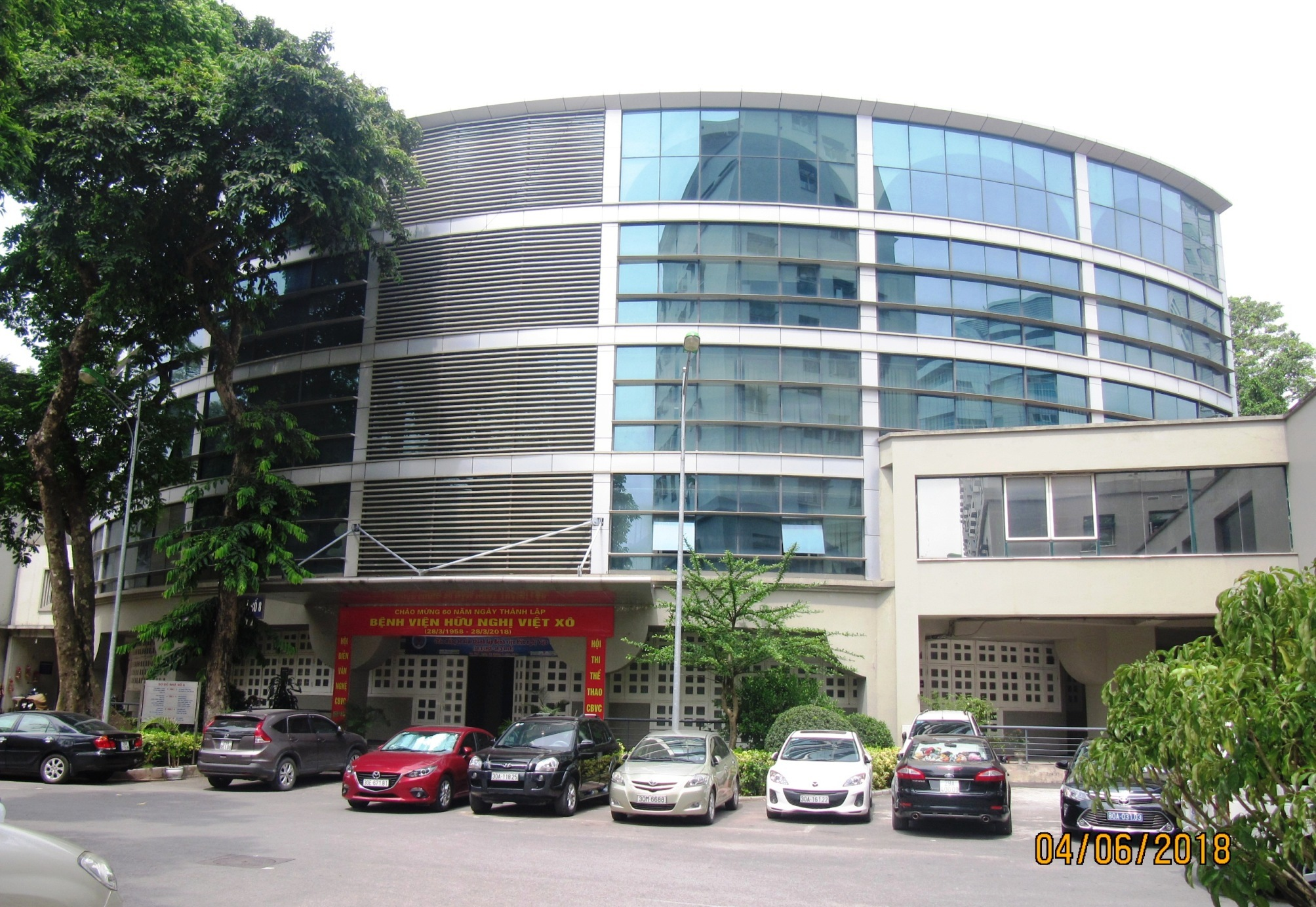
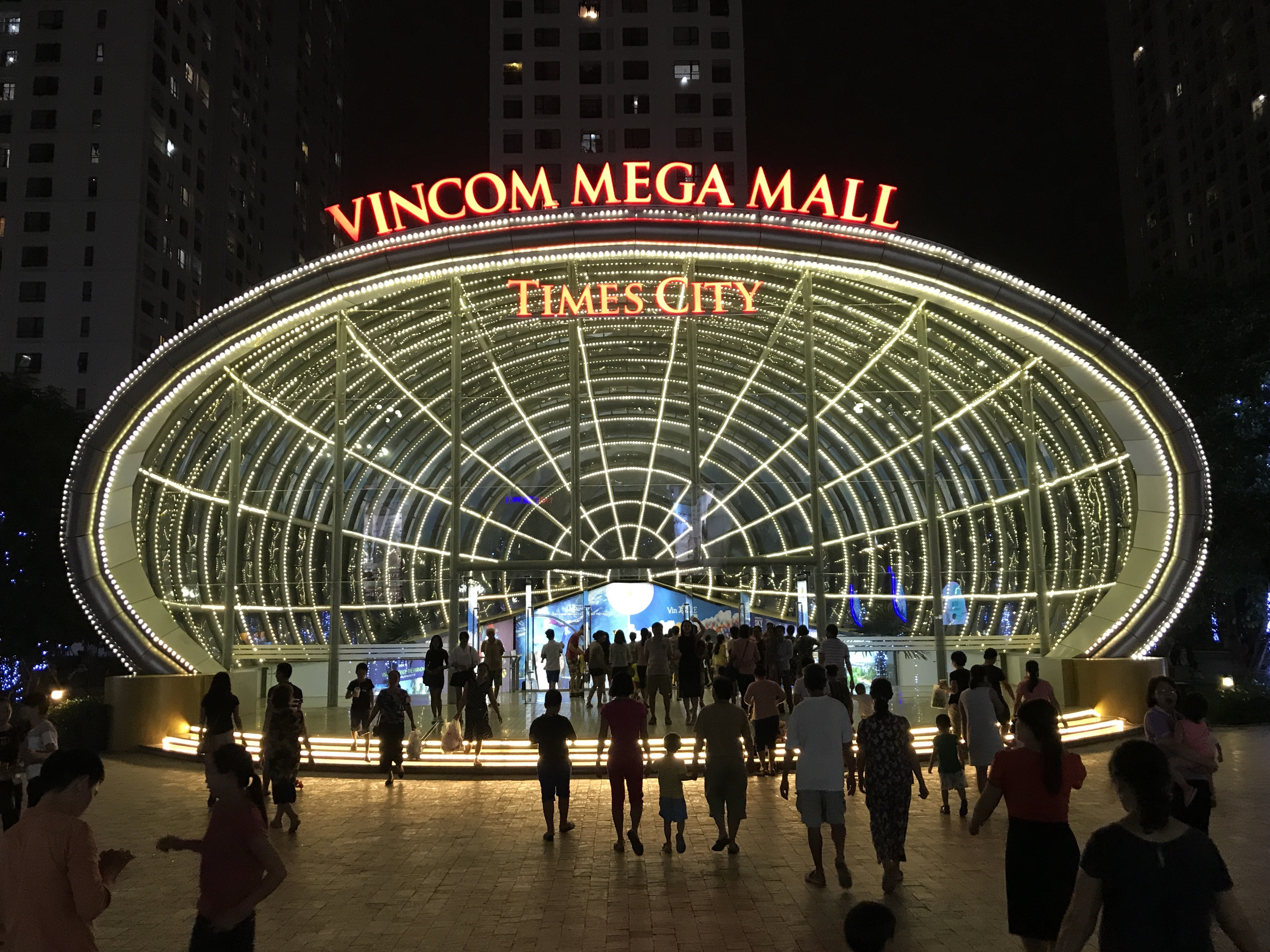
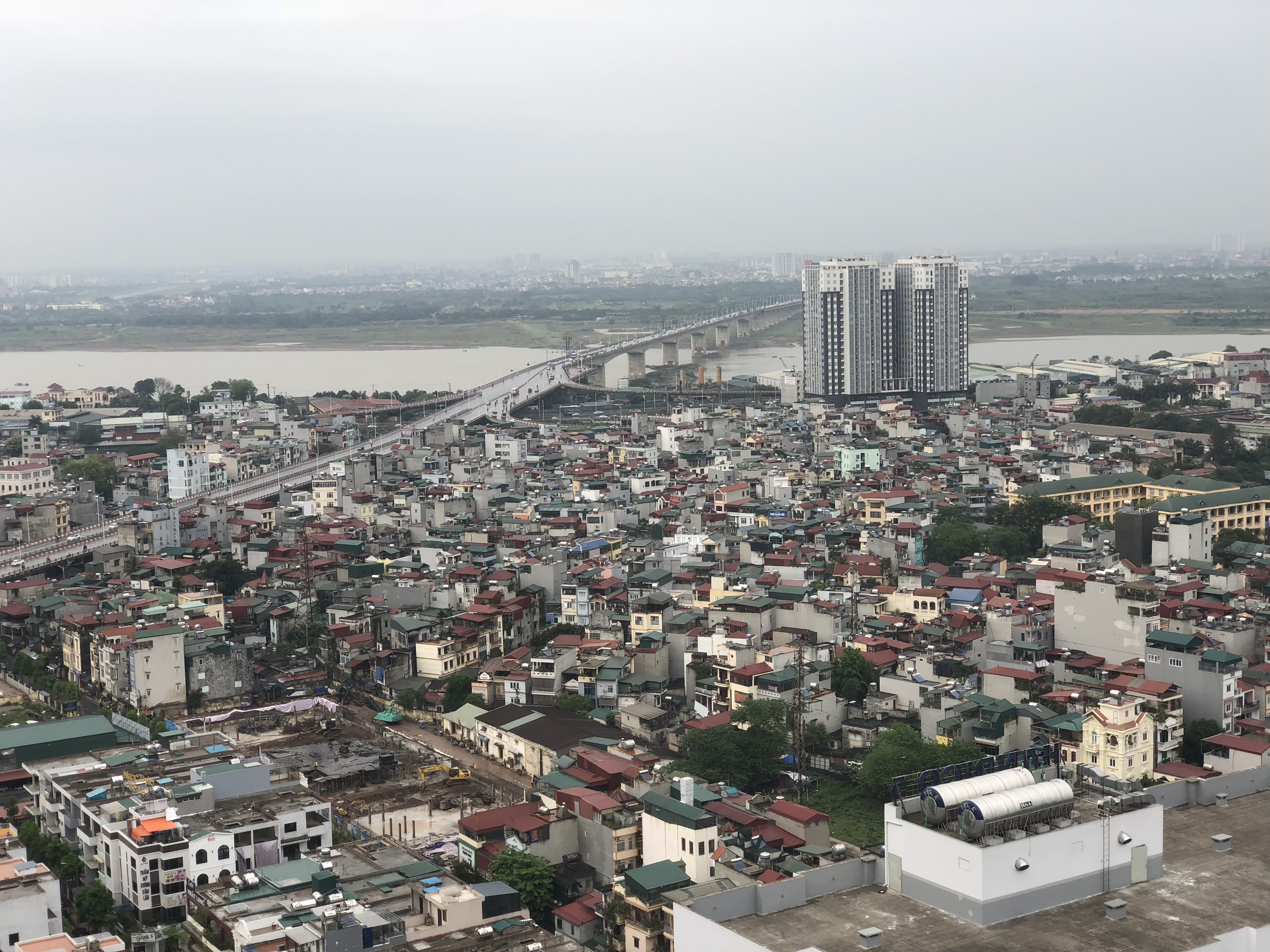
- Hai Bà Trưng Temple Đức Viên Pagoda Hanoi University of Science and Technology Hanoi Friendship Hospital Vincom Mega Mall Times City Skyline and Vĩnh Tuy Bridge
- Interactive map of Hai Bà Trưng district
- Country: Vietnam
- Province: Hanoi
- Seat: Bách Khoa ward
- Wards: 18 wards

Area
  - Total: 10.26 km^{2} (3.96 sq mi)

Population (2019)
  - Total: 303,586
  - Density: 29,590/km^{2} (76,640/sq mi)
- Time zone: UTC+7 (ICT)
- Area code: 24
- Climate: Cwa
- Website: Official website (in Vietnamese)

Hai Bà Trưng (Trưng Sisters District) is one of the four original urban districts (quận) of Hanoi, the capital city of Vietnam. The district currently has 18 wards, covering a total area of 10.26 square kilometres (3.96 sq mi). It is bordered by Long Biên district, Đống Đa district, Thanh Xuân district, Hoàng Mai district, Hoàn Kiếm district. As of 2019, there were 303,586 people residing in the district, the population density is 30,000 inhabitants per square kilometer.

Established as one of the first four central districts of the city, it is named after the two heroines in Vietnamese history: the Trưng Sisters. Some of Vietnam's largest universities are located here, including the Hanoi University of Technology, Hanoi National Economic University, and Hanoi University of Civil Engineering.

== History ==
Historically, the area was part of various administrative divisions under the old Thọ Xương and Thanh Trì districts. Before 1961, the area comprised the neighborhoods of Bạch Mai, Hai Bà, Hàng Cỏ, and parts of the former suburban District VI. In 1961, it was officially established as Hai Bà Trưng District, becoming one of Hanoi's original four inner districts after the capital’s administrative reorganization.

== Geography ==
Hai Bà Trưng District is located in the central eastern part of Hanoi. It borders:

- Long Biên District across the Red River to the east,
- Hoàn Kiếm District to the north,
- Đống Đa and Thanh Xuân Districts to the west,
- Hoàng Mai District to the south.

== Administrative divisions ==
Hai Bà Trưng district is divided into 18 wards (Bách Khoa, Bạch Đằng, Bạch Mai, Cầu Dền, Đống Mác, Đồng Nhân, Đồng Tâm, Lê Đại Hành, Minh Khai, Nguyễn Du, Phạm Đình Hổ, Phố Huế, Quỳnh Lôi, Quỳnh Mai, Thanh Lương, Thanh Nhàn, Trương Định, Vĩnh Tuy).
