= Hoàng Mai district =

Coordinates: 20°58′05″N 105°50′54″E

Hoàng Mai District Quận Hoàng Mai
- Urban district
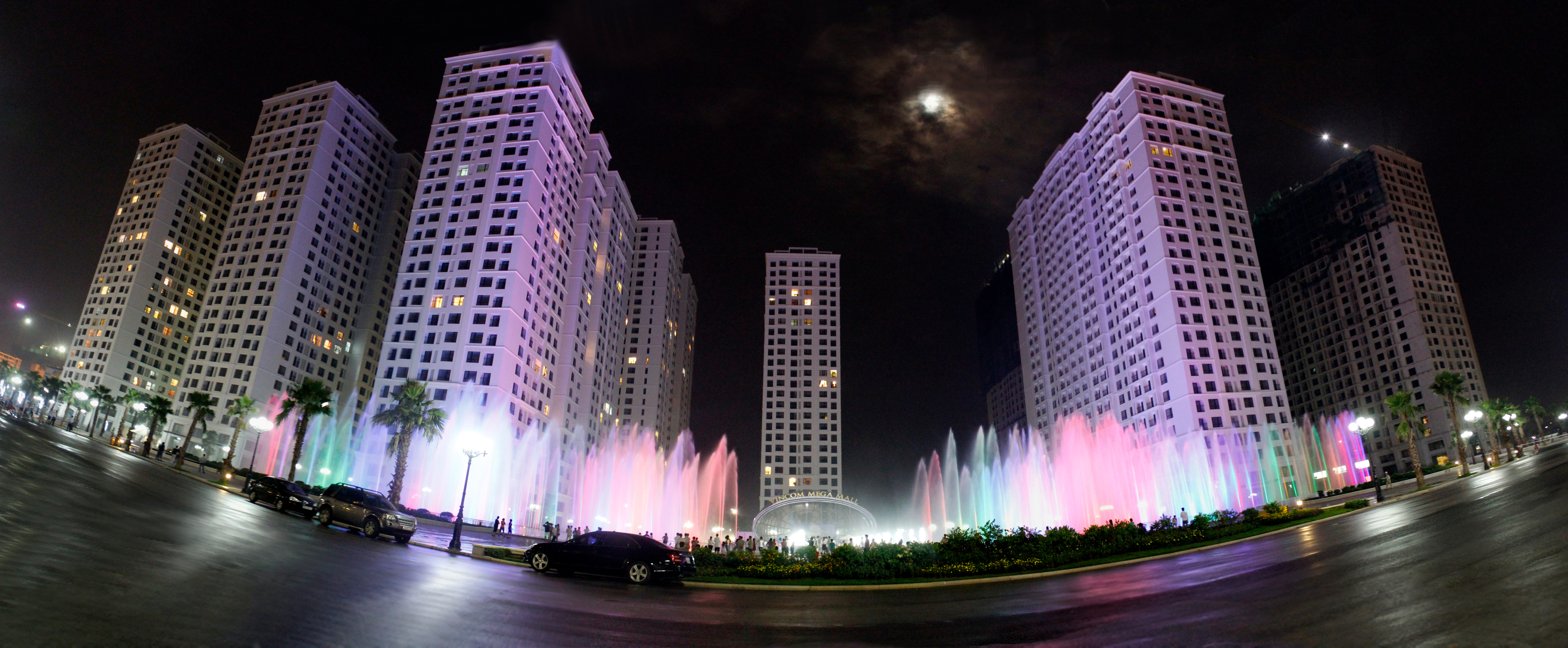
- An apartment complex in Hoàng Mai
- Interactive map of Hoàng Mai District
- Country: Vietnam
- Province: Hanoi
- Seat: Thịnh Liệt ward
- Wards: 14 wards

Area
  - Total: 40.32 km^{2} (15.57 sq mi)

Population (2019)
  - Total: 506,347
  - Density: 12,560/km^{2} (32,530/sq mi)
- Time zone: UTC+7 (ICT)
- Area code: 24
- Climate: Cwa
- Website: Official website (in Vietnamese)

Hoàng Mai is a former urban district (quận) of Hanoi, the capital city of Vietnam. The district currently has 14 wards, covering a total area of 40.32 square kilometres (15.57 sq mi). As of 2019, there were 506,347 people residing in the district, the highest of all districts in Hanoi. The district borders Thanh Trì District, Thanh Xuân District, Gia Lâm District, Long Biên District, Hai Bà Trưng District.

== History ==
Hoàng Mai was founded as an urban district by Vietnamese government's Decree 132/2003/NĐ-CP on 6 November 2003 from 5 wards of Hai Bà Trưng and 9 communes of Thanh Trì.

== Administrative divisions ==
Hoàng Mai District is divided into 14 wards: Đại Kim, Định Công, Giáp Bát, Hoàng Liệt, Hoàng Văn Thụ, Lĩnh Nam, Mai Động, Tân Mai, Thanh Trì, Thịnh Liệt, Trần Phú, Tương Mai, Vĩnh Hưng, Yên Sở.
