= Thanh Trì district =

Thanh Trì district Huyện Thanh Trì
- District
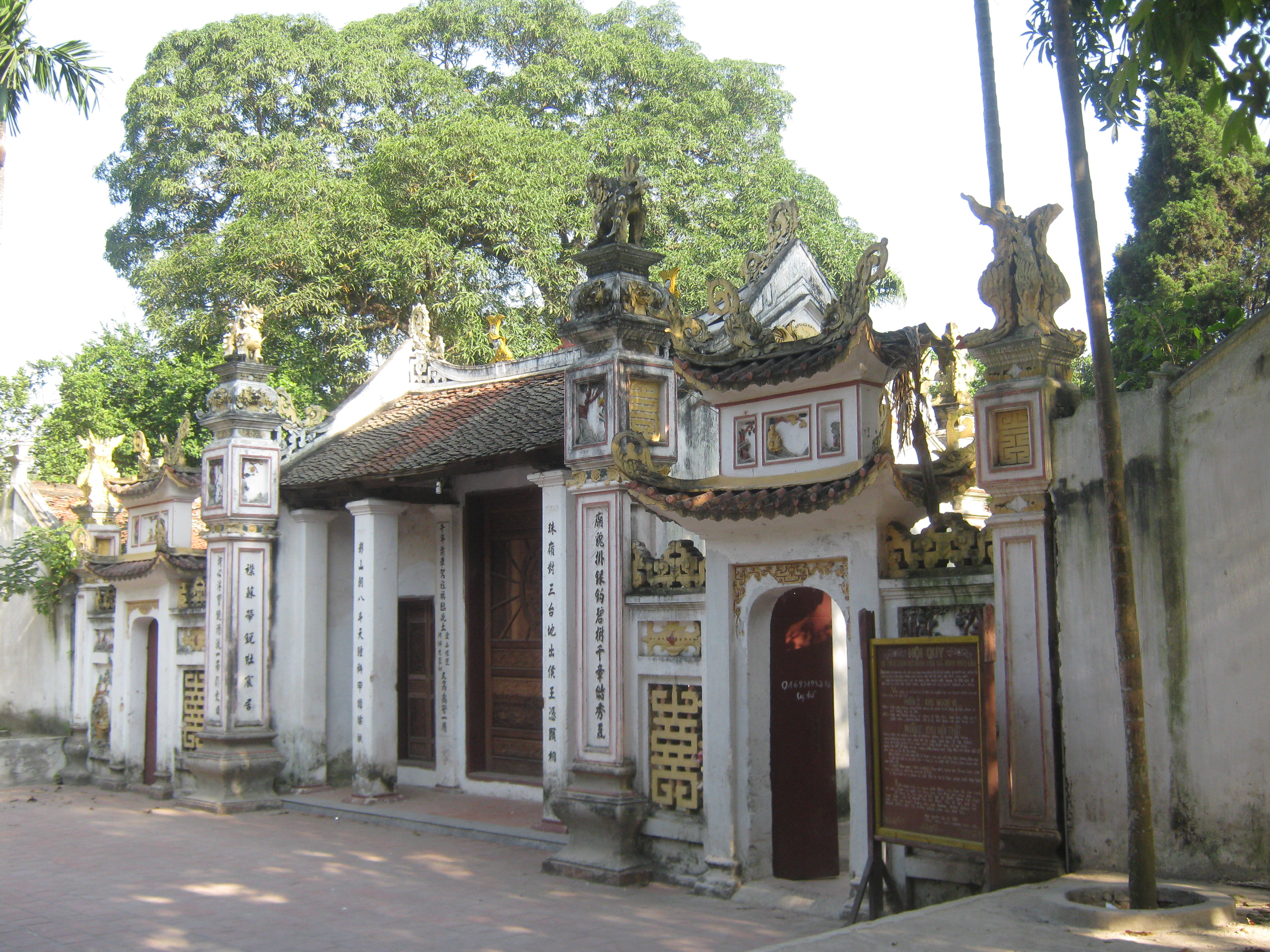
- Đình Hoa Xá (also known as Hoa Xa) temple

- Location within Hanoi
- Coordinates: 20.945090°N 105.844452°E
- Country: Vietnam
- Region: Red River Delta
- Municipality: Hanoi
- Capital: Văn Điển
- Time zone: UTC+7 (Indochina Time)

Thanh Trì is a former district (huyện) of Hanoi, the capital city of Vietnam.

== Location ==
Thanh Trì is located on the southeastern side of Hanoi, on the western bank of the Red River. It is adjacent to Thanh Xuân district in the northwest, Hoàng Mai district in the north, Hà Đông in the west, Gia Lâm district in the east (across the Red River), and Thanh Oai district and Thường Tín district in the south.

Thanh Trì's terrain is mostly low-lying, gradually descending towards the southeast in the direction of flow of the Red River. The Tô Lịch River flows into the Red River within the district, and the many ponds, lakes and swamps nearby no doubt influenced the district's name; "Thanh Trì" means "blue/green pond", and the district's historical name, Thanh Đầm, means "blue/green lagoon".

Thanh Trì district is composed of one town (Văn Điển) and 15 communes: Thanh Liệt, Đông Mỹ, Yên Mỹ, Duyên Hà, Tam Hiệp, Tứ Hiệp, Ngũ Hiệp, Ngọc Hồi, Vĩnh Quỳnh, Tả Thanh Oai, Đại Áng, Vạn Phúc, Liên Ninh, Hữu Hòa and Tân Triều.

On April 8, 2008, an Antonov An-26 aircraft on a training mission crashed into a field in Thanh Trì, killing five Vietnamese military pilots. It had taken off from Gia Lâm Airport, and crashed on its way back. The cause of the crash was unknown. A Vietnamese military official who declined to be named said the plane belonged to Vietnam's 918 Air Transport Regiment.

Thanh Trì is famous for its variety of the rolled rice noodle dish bánh cuốn, called bánh cuốn Thanh Trì.
