= Buses in Hanoi =

Public transportation in Hanoi

Buses are one of the main types of public transport in Hanoi, alongside the Hanoi Metro, operated by the state-owned Transerco and several private companies serving the city centre and towns in greater Hanoi as well as connecting Hanoi with neighbouring provinces. Buses in Hanoi are easily recognisable with their blue paint scheme, while some others are also painted green, orange and older red-yellow colours. The earliest bus service begins at 4:30 a.m. while the latest bus departure across the network is at 10:30 p.m. Service may be extended to 11:30 p.m. on weekends on select routes. Most Hanoi buses are equipped with an audio system (accompanied with a LED display in certain routes) to announce the stops. LED panels at some bus stops display live route information.

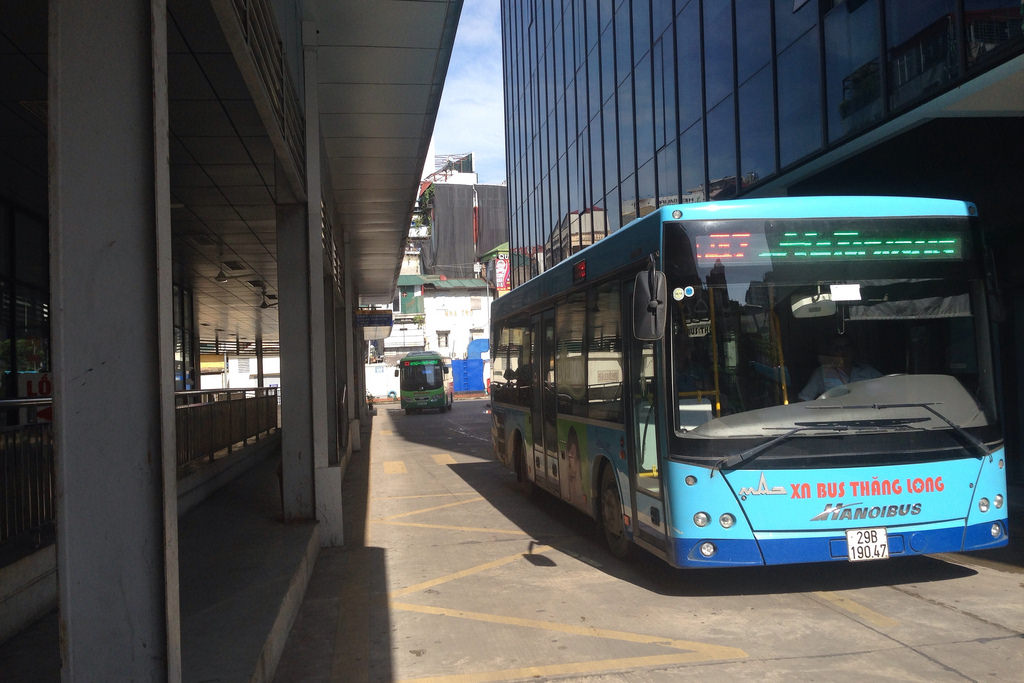
A MAZ bus in Hanoi operating on route 107

== Routes ==
The network includes subsidized buses, non-subsidized buses, airport buses and provincial buses that connect Hanoi with neighbouring provinces. As of November 2023, the city had 2,034 buses serving 154 bus lines, which included 132 subsidized lines (including airport buses), 8 non-subsidized, 12 provincial, and 2 city tour lines. These lines covered all 30 districts/towns, and 512/579 communes/wards around the city. The city also introduced electronic tickets and planned to replace 4,000 human conductors on buses in the near future.

=== Subsidized buses ===
There are currently over 100 government-subsidized bus routes in Hanoi, numbering from 01 to 126. Branch routes of a main route are usually marked by the number plus a letter. For example, 06B runs between Giáp Bát Bus Station and Hồng Vân and shares most of its route with 06. The system also includes BRT and DRT services.

Hanoi officials have been planning to put the compressed natural gas (CNG) buses into service with three new routes in July 2018. However, service only started two months later in September 2018. As of now, eleven routes numbered 142, 143, 144, 157, 157TC, 158, 159, 160, 161, 162 and 163 use CNG buses in Hanoi. Routes 23 (Nguyễn Công Trứ), 56B (Vietnam Buddhist Academy) and E11 (Yên Phụ) are loop routes.

=== Non-subsidized buses ===
==== Airport buses ====
In addition to four subsidized routes serving Noi Bai International Airport: 07 (from Cau Giay Bus Interchange), 17 (from Long Bien Bus Interchange), 90 (from Kim Ma Bus Station) and 109 (from My Dinh Bus Station) Transerco also operates two high-quality non-subsidized routes, numbered 68, from Me Linh Plaza (Ha Dong) and 86, from Hanoi Railway Station.

==== Provincial routes ====
These routes connect Hanoi with nearby provinces like Hung Yen, Ha Nam, Bac Ninh and Bac Giang, as well as further districts from the city centre like Ba Vi. The fare is usually divided along different sections of the route, and usually ranges between 60,000 - 140,000 ₫ for a whole trip between the termini.

== Fares ==
From Nov. 1st 2024 to Jul. 1st 2026, complying with the Hanoi People's Committee's approval of Hanoi DoT's proposal, the new single journey ticket fares for subsidized bus routes were as follows:

- ₫8,000 for bus routes no longer than 15 km
- ₫10,000 for bus routes between 15 km and 25 km long
- ₫12,000 for bus routes between 25 km and 30 km long
- ₫15,000 for bus routes between 30 km and 40 km long
- ₫20,000 for bus routes longer than 40 km

with the fares of non-subsidized bus routes unaffected.

The fare systems of Hanoi buses and Hanoi Metro were supposed to be unified on Sep. 2nd 2025 to ensure fairness, but that didn't happen until July 2026.

On Jul. 1st 2026, the new ticketing system was released.

According to official sources, the single journey ticket fares are generally calculated based on the formula: 3000 + 450 * distance (VND) with ₫3000 being the opening price and distance counted in kilometers. The fares paid by different modes of payment are different.

- For passengers paying by Transport Pass or MoMo:

fare = 3000 + 450 * distance (VND)

distance (in kilometers, rounded to the nearest 100 meters) counts from where you get on to where you get off.

- For passengers paying by cash:

fare = ⌈(3 + 0.450 * distance)⌉ (thousand VND)

distance (in kilometers) counts from where you get on to the terminus.

In extremely rare cases where the machine doesn't work, the fare will be calculated as it was from November 2024.

Regular commuters can now purchase a 30-day bus pass for ₫140,000 to use on 1 specific route or ₫280,000 to use on all routes. Students, industrial zone workers and the elderly pay half price for the pass (₫70,000 for one route & ₫140,000 for all routes).

== List of bus routes in Hanoi (updated October 2026) ==
Note: Routes marked with ^{[a]} now calculate fares based on distance, using the following formula: 3,000₫ + 450₫ * distance. The displayed fare is used ONLY when the machine malfunctions.

=== City routes (Standard) ===
These are routes listed with numbers smaller than 200, with a few special routes like BRT, CNG, and electric bus routes.

The CT (cuối tuần) suffix is used for routes that avoid Hoàn Kiếm Lake walking street, Trần Nhân Tông walking street or Ring Road 1 low emission zone during the weekends (i.e. 08ACT, 09ACT, 40CT, 86CT, 146CT).

Route	Termini			Operation time	Frequency	Average length	Fare	Operation unit	Notes
01	Gia Lâm Bus Station Bồ Đề ward	↔	Yên Nghĩa Bus Station Yên Nghĩa ward	5:00 - 21:00 every day	11-13-15-20 min	21.5 km (13.4 miles)	10,000 ₫ (Note: 3,000₫ + 450₫ * distance)	Hanoi Bus Enterprise	
02	Bác Cổ (Trần Khánh Dư Bus Interchange) Cửa Nam ward	↔	Yên Nghĩa Bus Station Yên Nghĩa ward	5:00 - 22:30 every day	5-15 min	16.8 km (10.4 miles)	10,000 ₫	Hanoi Express Bus Enterprise	
03A	Giáp Bát Bus Station Hoàng Mai ward	↔	Gia Lâm Bus Station Bồ Đề ward	5:03 - 21:03 every day	5-10-15 min	15.15 km (9.41 miles)	10,000 ₫	Hanoi Bus Enterprise	
03B	Nước Ngầm Bus Station Yên Sở ward	↔	Giang Biên (Việt Hưng Ward)	5:00 - 20:00 every day	20 min	19.55 km (12.15 miles)	10,000 ₫	Hanoi Bus Enterprise	Branch route
04	Long Biên Bus Interchange Ba Đình ward	↔	Nat'l Hospital of Endocrinology II Yên Sở ward	5:00 - 21:00 every day	15-20 min	17.5 km (10.9 miles)	10,000 ₫	Southern Hanoi Passenger Car Enterprise	04CT (19:00 Fri - 24:00 Sun) does not go through Ring Road 1 low emission zone
06A	Giáp Bát Bus Station Hoàng Mai ward	↔	Cầu Giẽ (Hanoi - Ninh Binh Freeway) Chuyên Mỹ commune	5:00 - 21:00 every day	10-20 min	34.5 km (21.4 miles)	15,000 ₫	Tân Đạt Center	Connecting routes
06B	Giáp Bát Bus Station Hoàng Mai ward	↔	Hồng Vân Commune	5:00 - 21:00 every day	24 min	18.35 km (11.40 miles)	10,000 ₫	Tân Đạt Center	Branch route
06C	Giáp Bát Bus Station Hoàng Mai ward	↔	Phú Minh (Phú Xuyên Commune)	5:00 - 21:00 every day	26 min	27.95 km (17.37 miles)	12,000 ₫	Tân Đạt Center	Branch route
06D	Giáp Bát Bus Station Hoàng Mai ward	↔	Tân Dân (Chuyên Mỹ Commune)	5:25 - 20:00 every day	24 min	32.9 km (20.4 miles)	15,000 ₫	Cầu Bươu Bus Enterprise	Branch route
06E	Giáp Bát Bus Station Hoàng Mai ward	↔	Phú Túc (Phượng Dực Commune)	5:15 - 21:45 every day	26 min	33.85 km (21.03 miles)	15,000 ₫	Cầu Bươu Bus Enterprise	Branch route
07	Cầu Giấy Bus Interchange Láng ward	↔	Nội Bài International Airport (Terminal T1) Nội Bài commune	5:00 - 22:35 every day	10-15 min	27.25 km (16.93 miles)	12,000 ₫	Hanoi Electric Vehicle JSC	Connecting routes
13	Hồ Tây Waterpark Tây Hồ ward	↔	Cổ Nhuế (People's Police Academy) Đông Ngạc ward	5:00 - 21:06 every day	16 min	14.25 km (8.85 miles)	8,000 ₫	10-10 Bus Enterprise	Feeder service
20A	Nhổn Bus Interchange (Hanoi University of Industry) Tây Tựu ward	NR32 ↔	Sơn Tây Bus Station Sơn Tây ward	Nhổn: 5:00 - 20:47; Sơn Tây: 4:35 - 20:37 every day	14 min	26.85 km (16.68 miles)	12,000 ₫	10-10 Bus Enterprise	
20ATC	Nhổn Bus Interchange (Hanoi University of Industry) Tây Tựu ward	NR32 ↔	Minh Châu Commune	Nhổn: 4:40 - 19:50; Minh Châu: 4:40 - 19:00 every day	30-35-50 min	44.45 km (27.62 miles)	20,000 ₫	10-10 Bus Enterprise	Branch route, Supplemental service Began operation at 04:44 on Oct. 1st 2025.
20B	Nhổn Bus Interchange (Hanoi University of Industry) Tây Tựu ward	↔	Sơn Tây Bus Station Sơn Tây ward	5:00 - 20:04 every day	20 min	37.85 km (23.52 miles)	15,000 ₫	10-10 Bus Enterprise	Branch route
23	Nguyễn Công Trứ; Transerco HQ Hai Bà Trưng ward	Long Biên ↔ Vân Hồ	Nguyễn Công Trứ; Transerco HQ Hai Bà Trưng ward	5:00 - 21:00 every day	15-20 min	17.65 km (10.97 miles)	10,000 ₫	Hanoi Bus Enterprise	Feeder service, Loop route 23CT (19:00 Fri - 24:00 Sun) does not go through Ring Road 1 low emission zone
25	National Hospital for Tropical Diseases II Thiên Lộc commune	↔	Giáp Bát Bus Station Hoàng Mai ward	5:09 - 21:00 every day	10-15-20 min	27.6 km (17.1 miles)	12,000 ₫	Hanoi Electric Vehicle JSC	
27	Yên Nghĩa Bus Station Yên Nghĩa ward	↔	Nam Thăng Long Bus Station Xuân Đỉnh ward	5:00 - 21:00 every day	7-10 min	21.25 km (13.20 miles)	10,000 ₫	Hanoi Electric Vehicle JSC	
28	Nước Ngầm Bus Station Yên Sở ward	↔	Hanoi University of Mining and Geology Đông Ngạc ward	5:00 - 21:07 every day	10-20 min	22.7 km (14.1 miles)	10,000 ₫	10-10 Bus Enterprise	
31	Hanoi University of Science and Technology Bạch Mai ward	↔	Chèm (Hanoi University of Mining and Geology) Đông Ngạc ward	5:05 - 21:00 every day	10-20 min	19.5 km (12.1 miles)	10,000 ₫	Hanoi Bus Enterprise	31CT (19:00 Fri - 24:00 Sun) does not go through Ring Road 1 low emission zone
32	Giáp Bát Bus Station Hoàng Mai ward	↔	Nhổn Bus Interchange Xuân Phuơng ward	5:00 - 22:30 every day	5-20 min	18.65 km (11.59 miles)	10,000 ₫	Cầu Bươu Bus Enterprise	
33	Thanh Oai Industrial Complex Bình Minh commune	↔	Xuân Đỉnh Ward	5:04 - 21:04 every day	16-20 min	24.05 km (14.94 miles)	10,000 ₫	Tân Đạt Center	
35A	Trần Khánh Dư Bus Interchange Cửa Nam ward	↔	Nam Thăng Long Bus Station Xuân Đỉnh ward	5:00 - 21:00 every day	15-20 min	18.5 km (11.5 miles)	10,000 ₫	Hanoi Electric Vehicle JSC	
35B	Nam Thăng Long Bus Station Xuân Đỉnh ward	↔	Thanh Lâm (Tiến Thắng Commune)	5:05 - 21:00 every day	15-30 min	23.65 km (14.70 miles)	10,000 ₫	Hanoi Electric Vehicle JSC	Branch route
40	Thống Nhất Park Hai Bà Trưng ward	↔	Văn Lâm Như Quỳnh commune, Hưng Yên province	5:00 - 22:00 every day	12 min	24.75 km (15.38 miles)	10,000 ₫	Hanoi Bus Enterprise	Connecting routes 40CT (Sat & Sun) does not go through Trần Nhân Tông walking street
42	Giáp Bát Bus Station Hoàng Mai ward	↔	Trung Mầu (Phù Đổng Commune)	5:00 - 21:00 every day	15-20 min	29.85 km (18.55 miles)	12,000 ₫	Hanoi Passenger Car JSC (Tân Long)	Connecting routes
48	Nước Ngầm Bus Station Yên Sở ward	↔	Phúc Lợi Ward (Ruby City)	5:00 - 21:30 every day	15-20 min	25.25 km (15.69 miles)	12,000 ₫	Newway Transportation JSC	
51	Gia Lâm Bus Station Bồ Đề ward	↔	Trần Vỹ (Judicial Academy) Phú Diễn ward	5:00 - 21:00 every day	10-20 min	24.1 km (15.0 miles)	10,000 ₫	Hanoi Passenger Car JSC (Tân Long)	
52	Thống Nhất Park Hai Bà Trưng ward	↔	Lệ Chi; Hanoi Industrial Textile Garment University Thuận An commune	5:06 - 21:07 every day	17-25 min	25.4 km (15.8 miles)	10,000 ₫	Hanoi Bus Enterprise	Connecting routes 52CT (Sat & Sun) does not go through Trần Nhân Tông walking street
53A	Hoàng Quốc Việt Bus Interchange Nghĩa Đô ward	↔	Đông Anh Town (Đông Anh Commune)	5:12 - 21:30 every day	20 min	23.55 km (14.63 miles)	10,000 ₫	10-10 Bus Enterprise	Connecting routes
53B	Mỹ Đình Bus Station Từ Liêm ward	↔	Kim Hoa (Quang Minh Commune)	5:00 - 20:50 every day	20 min	24.7 km (15.3 miles)	10,000 ₫	10-10 Bus Enterprise	Branch route
55	AEON MALL Long Bien Long Biên ward	↔	Cầu Giấy Bus Interchange Láng ward	5:20 - 20:50 every day	10-40 min	22.5 km (14.0 miles)	10,000 ₫	Hanoi Electric Vehicle JSC	Branch route
56A	Mỹ Đình National Stadium Từ Liêm ward	↔	Núi Đôi; Electric Power University II Sóc Sơn commune	Nat'l Stadium: 5:35 - 20:40; Núi Đôi: 5:30 - 20:00 every day	15-20 min	35.85 km (22.28 miles)	15,000 ₫	Hanoi Electric Vehicle JSC	Connecting routes
56B	Vietnam Buddhist Academy Sóc Sơn commune	Xuân Giang ↔ Bắc Phú	Vietnam Buddhist Academy Sóc Sơn commune	4:50 - 18:40 every day	20-25 min	35.5 km (22.1 miles)	15,000 ₫	Hanoi Electric Vehicle JSC	Branch route, Loop route
57	Nam Thăng Long Bus Station Xuân Đỉnh ward	↔	Phú Nghĩa Industrial Park Phú Nghĩa commune	4:45 - 21:15 every day	15-20 min	39.5 km (24.5 miles)	20,000 ₫	Bảo Yến Tourism, Service and Construction Company Ltd.	Connecting routes
58	Long Biên Bus Interchange Ba Đình ward	↔	Thạch Đà; Mê Linh General Hospital Yên Lãng commune	5:00 - 21:00 every day	10-15 min	43.5 km (27.0 miles)	20,000 ₫	Bảo Yến Tourism, Service and Construction Company Ltd.	Connecting routes
61	Dục Tú (Thư Lâm Commune)	↔	Cầu Giấy Park Cầu Giấy ward	5:00 - 21:00 every day	10-15 min	36.9 km (22.9 miles)	15,000 ₫	Bảo Yến Tourism, Service and Construction Company Ltd.	Connecting routes
62	Yên Nghĩa Bus Station Yên Nghĩa ward	↔	Thường Tín Bus Station Thường Tín commune	5:00 - 21:00 every day	10-15 min	21.4 km (13.3 miles)	10,000 ₫	Tân Đạt Center	Connecting routes
63	Bắc Thăng Long Industrial Park Thiên Lộc commune	↔	Tiến Thịnh (Yên Lãng Commune)	5:00 - 21:45 every day	15-20 min	26.8 km (16.7 miles)	12,000 ₫	Yên Viên Bus Enterprise	Connecting routes
64	Mỹ Đình Bus Station Từ Liêm ward	↔	Phố Nỉ (Bình An Trade Center) Trung Giã commune	5:00 - 21:00 every day	15 min	42.2 km (26.2 miles)	20,000 ₫	Hải Vân International Shipping Joint Venture Company	Connecting routes
65	Thụy Lâm (Thư Lâm Commune)	↔	Long Biên Bus Interchange Ba Đình ward	5:00 - 21:00 every day	10-20 min	28.2 km (17.5 miles)	12,000 ₫	Bảo Yến Tourism, Service and Construction Company Ltd.	Connecting routes
66	Yên Nghĩa Bus Station Yên Nghĩa ward	↔	Đan Phượng Commune	5:00 - 20:30 every day	20-30 min	27.75 km (17.24 miles)	12,000 ₫	Hanoi Express Bus Enterprise	Feeder service
67	Đan Phượng Commune	↔	Yên Bài Commune	4:45 - 20:35 every day	25-30 min	40 km (25 miles)	15,000 ₫	10-10 Bus Enterprise	Feeder service
68	Yên Nghĩa Bus Station Yên Nghĩa ward	↔	Nội Bài International Airport (Terminal T1) Nội Bài commune	5:15 - 22:20 every day	45-50 min	42.4 km (26.3 miles)	55,000 ₫	Hanoi Express Bus Enterprise	Feeder service, Connecting routes High-quality non-subsidized airport route
69	Long Biên Bus Interchange Ba Đình ward	↔	Dương Quang (Thuận An Commune)	5:00 - 21:00 every day	20-25 min	33.5 km (20.8 miles)	15,000 ₫	Newway Transportation JSC	Feeder service
84	Cầu Diễn; Cầu Diễn Medical Station Từ Liêm ward	↔	Linh Đàm Urban Area Hoàng Liệt ward	5:00 - 21:00 every day	20-25 min	21.9 km (13.6 miles)	10,000 ₫	Cầu Bươu Bus Enterprise	Feeder service
85	Nghĩa Đô Park Nghĩa Đô ward	↔	Thanh Hà Urban Area Bình Minh commune	5:00 - 21:00 every day	20-25 min	20.2 km (12.6 miles)	10,000 ₫	Cầu Bươu Bus Enterprise	Feeder service
86	Hanoi Railway Station Văn Miếu - Quốc Tử Giám ward	↔	Nội Bài International Airport (Terminal T2) Nội Bài commune	5:15 - 22:10 every day	45 min	32.4 km (20.1 miles)	50,000 ₫	Hanoi Express Bus Enterprise	Connecting routes High-quality non-subsidized airport route 86CT (~16:00 Fri - 24:00 Sun) does not go through Hoàn Kiếm Lake
87	Mỹ Đình Bus Station Từ Liêm ward	Quốc Oai ↔	Xuân Mai Commune; CP Food Factory	5:00 - 22:30 every day	15-30 min	36.8 km (22.9 miles)	15,000 ₫	Southern Hanoi Passenger Car Enterprise	
88	Mỹ Đình Bus Station Từ Liêm ward	Hòa Lạc ↔	Xuân Mai Commune (Hà Tây Community College)	Mỹ Đình: 5:05 - 18:30; Xuân Mai: 5:00 - 20:10 every day	15-25 min	48.6 km (30.2 miles)	20,000 ₫	Southern Hanoi Passenger Car Enterprise	
89	Yên Nghĩa Bus Station Yên Nghĩa ward	↔	Sơn Tây Bus Station Sơn Tây ward	5:00 - 20:46 every day	20-22 min	45.95 km (28.55 miles)	20,000 ₫	Hanoi Express Bus Enterprise	Connecting routes
91	Yên Nghĩa Bus Station Yên Nghĩa ward	Kim Bài ↔	Phú Túc (Phượng Dực Commune)	Yên Nghĩa: 5:00 - 20:40; Phú Túc: 5:00 - 21:30 every day	20 min	29 km (18 miles)	12,000 ₫	Hanoi Express Bus Enterprise	Connecting routes
92	Nhổn Bus Interchange (Hanoi University of Industry) Xuân Phuơng ward	↔	Phú Sơn; Yên Kỳ Cemetery Vật Lại commune	Nhổn: 5:00 - 21:00; Phú Sơn: 4:30 - 21:00 every day	10-15 min	46 km (29 miles)	20,000 ₫	10-10 Bus Enterprise	Connecting routes
93	Nam Thăng Long Bus Station Xuân Đỉnh ward	↔	Bắc Sơn (Trung Giã Commune)	Nam Thăng Long: 5:05 - 18:50; Bắc Sơn: 5:25 - 20:45 every day	22-25 min	46.9 km (29.1 miles)	20,000 ₫	Yên Viên Bus Enterprise	Connecting routes
94	Giáp Bát Bus Station Hoàng Mai ward	↔	Kim Bài (Thanh Oai Commune)	5:05 - 21:30 every day	20-25 min	29.9 km (18.6 miles)	12,000 ₫	Newway Transportation JSC	Connecting routes
95	Nam Thăng Long Bus Station Xuân Đỉnh ward	↔	Xuân Hòa Ward (Hanoi Pedagogical University 2) Phú Thọ province	Nam Thăng Long: 5:00 - 19:45; Xuân Hòa: 5:15 - 21:05 every day	20 min	28.95 km (17.99 miles)	12,000 ₫	Yên Viên Bus Enterprise	Connecting routes
96	Cầu Giấy Bus Interchange Láng ward	↔	Đông Anh Town (Bắc Thăng Long General Hospital) Thư Lâm commune	Cầu Giấy: 5:00 - 21:00; Đông Anh: 5:00 - 20:50 every day	20-25 min	33.35 km (20.72 miles)	15,000 ₫	10-10 Bus Enterprise	Connecting routes
97	Hoài Đức Commune	↔	Nghĩa Đô Park Nghĩa Đô ward	5:00 - 21:00 every day	20-30 min	17.55 km (10.91 miles)	10,000 ₫	10-10 Bus Enterprise	Feeder service
98	Long Biên Bus Interchange Ba Đình ward	Ngọc Thụy ↔	AEON MALL Long Bien Long Biên ward	5:00 - 21:00 every day	20-30 min	19.55 km (12.15 miles)	10,000 ₫	Southern Hanoi Passenger Car Enterprise	Feeder service
99	Kim Mã Bus Station Giảng Võ ward	↔	Ngũ Hiệp (Thanh Trì Commune)	5:00 - 21:10 every day	15-20 min	16.5 km (10.3 miles)	10,000 ₫	Southern Hanoi Passenger Car Enterprise	Feeder service
100	Long Biên Bus Interchange Ba Đình ward	↔	Đặng Xá (Thuận An Commune)	5:00 - 21:10 every day	20-25 min	17.7 km (11.0 miles)	10,000 ₫	Hanoi Bus Enterprise	
101A	Giáp Bát Bus Station Hoàng Mai ward	↔	Vân Đình Commune	5:00 - 21:15 every day	22-30 min	52.8 km (32.8 miles)	20,000 ₫	Tân Đạt Center	
101B	Giáp Bát Bus Station Hoàng Mai ward	↔	Đại Cường (Ứng Hòa Commune)	5:05 - 19:20 every day	46-50 min	46.15 km (28.68 miles)	20,000 ₫	Tân Đạt Center	Branch route
102	Yên Nghĩa Bus Station Yên Nghĩa ward	↔	Vân Đình Commune	5:00 - 21:20 every day	20-30 min	32.2 km (20.0 miles)	15,000 ₫	Hanoi Express Bus Enterprise	
103A	Mỹ Đình Bus Station Từ Liêm ward	↔	Hương Pagoda; Hương Sơn Bus Station Hương Sơn commune	5:02 - 20:00 every day	15 min	60.5 km (37.6 miles)	20,000 ₫	Cầu Bươu Bus Enterprise	
103B	Mỹ Đình Bus Station Từ Liêm ward	Hồng Quang ↔	Hương Pagoda; Hương Sơn Bus Station Hương Sơn commune	5:08 - 20:10 every day	16-20 min	61 km (38 miles)	20,000 ₫	Cầu Bươu Bus Enterprise	Branch route
104	Mỹ Đình National Stadium Từ Liêm ward	↔	Nước Ngầm Bus Station Yên Sở ward	5:00 - 21:00 every day	21 min	19.25 km (11.96 miles)	10,000 ₫	Tân Đạt Center	Feeder service
105	Đô Nghĩa Urban Area Yên Nghĩa ward	↔	Cầu Giấy Bus Interchange Láng ward	5:00 - 21:00 every day	15 min	21.35 km (13.27 miles)	10,000 ₫	Hanoi Express Bus Enterprise	Feeder service
106	Mỗ Lao Urban Area Hà Đông ward	↔	AEON MALL Long Bien Long Biên ward	5:00 - 21:00 every day	20-30 min	24.2 km (15.0 miles)	10,000 ₫	Southern Hanoi Passenger Car Enterprise	Feeder service
107	Kim Mã Bus Station Giảng Võ ward	↔	Vietnam National Villages for Ethnic Culture and Tourism Yên Bài commune	5:00 - 20:50 every day	15-20 min	49.7 km (30.9 miles)	20,000 ₫	Hanoi Express Bus Enterprise	
108	Thường Tín Bus Station Thường Tín commune	↔	Minh Tân (Đại Xuyên Commune)	4:25 - 21:00 every day	20-30-40 min	30.75 km (19.11 miles)	15,000 ₫	Hanoi Bus Enterprise	Feeder service
108TC	Thường Tín Bus Station Thường Tín commune	↔	Quang Lãng (Đại Xuyên Commune)	5:00 - 21:00 every day	40-60 min	28.8 km (17.9 miles)	12,000 ₫	Hanoi Bus Enterprise	Feeder service, Branch route, Supplemental service Began operation on Jan. 16th 2026.
109	Mỹ Đình Bus Station Từ Liêm ward	↔	Nội Bài International Airport (Terminal T1) Nội Bài commune	5:00 - 21:00 every day	20-30 min	27 km (17 miles)	12,000 ₫	Hanoi Electric Vehicle JSC	Connecting routes
110	Sơn Tây Bus Station Sơn Tây ward	↔	(Khánh Thượng Commune)	5:00 - 19:30 every day	20-28-30 min	35 km (22 miles)	15,000 ₫	10-10 Bus Enterprise	Connecting routes
111	Sơn Tây Bus Station Sơn Tây ward	↔	Bất Bạt Commune	4:30 - 20:20 every day	25 min	28.35 km (17.62 miles)	12,000 ₫	10-10 Bus Enterprise	Feeder service
112	Nam Thăng Long Bus Station Xuân Đỉnh ward	↔	Thạch Đà; Mê Linh General Hospital Yên Lãng commune	Nam Thăng Long: 4:45 - 19:42; Thạch Đà: 5:19 - 20:16 every day	15-30 min	23.8 km (14.8 miles)	10,000 ₫	Yên Viên Bus Enterprise	Feeder service
113	Thường Tín Bus Station Thường Tín commune	↔	Vườn Chuối Wharf Phú Xuyên commune	Thường Tín: 5:00 - 19:50; Vườn Chuối: 5:00 - 20:00 every day	20-35 min	26.9 km (16.7 miles)	12,000 ₫	Tân Đạt Center	Feeder service
114	Yên Nghĩa Bus Station Yên Nghĩa ward	↔	Miếu Môn (Trần Phú Commune)	Yên Nghĩa: 5:00 - 20:30; Miếu Môn: 5:00 - 21:00 every day	20-25-30 min	22.4 km (13.9 miles)	10,000 ₫	Hanoi Express Bus Enterprise	Feeder service
115	Vân Đình Commune	↔	Nat'l Uni. of Forestry Xuân Mai commune	5:15 - 20:30 every day	20-25 min	40.3 km (25.0 miles)	20,000 ₫	Tân Đạt Center	Feeder service
116	Yên Nghĩa Bus Station Yên Nghĩa ward	↔	Yên Xuân Commune	Yên Nghĩa: 5:20 - 21:00; Yên Xuân: 4:50 - 20:30 every day	20-25 min	45.2 km (28.1 miles)	20,000 ₫	Hanoi Express Bus Enterprise	Feeder service
117	Hòa Lạc Hi-tech Park (FPT University) Hòa Lạc commune	↔	Nhổn Bus Interchange (Hanoi University of Industry) Xuân Phuơng ward	5:00 - 20:30 every day	20-30 min	42 km (26 miles)	20,000 ₫	Cầu Bươu Bus Enterprise	Feeder service
118	Sơn Tây Bus Station Sơn Tây ward	↔	Bất Bạt Commune (Tòng Bạt Central Market)	Sơn Tây: 5:10 - 20:50; Tòng Bạt Market: 5:00 - 20:00 every day	20 min	40.65 km (25.26 miles)	20,000 ₫	Hà Tây Passenger Car JSC	Feeder service
119	Hòa Lạc Hi-tech Park (FPT University) Hòa Lạc commune	↔	Bất Bạt Commune	Hòa Lạc: 5:30 - 20:30; Bất Bạt: 5:00 - 19:50 every day	20-25-30 min	41.1 km (25.5 miles)	20,000 ₫	Cầu Bươu Bus Enterprise	Feeder service
122	Gia Lâm Bus Station Bồ Đề ward	↔	Bắc Thăng Long Industrial Zone Thiên Lộc commune	5:00 - 21:00 every day	20-25 min	32.05 km (19.91 miles)	15,000 ₫	Hanoi Passenger Car JSC (Tân Long)	Minibus
123	Yên Nghĩa Bus Station Yên Nghĩa ward	↔	Hồng Dương (Dân Hòa Commune)	5:00 - 21:00 every day	20-30 min	22.65 km (14.07 miles)	10,000 ₫	Đông Anh Transport, Trading and Tourism JSC	Minibus
124	Yên Nghĩa Bus Station Yên Nghĩa ward	↔	Hồng Sơn Commune	5:00 - 21:00 every day	15-20-25 min	37.4 km (23.2 miles)	15,000 ₫	Hanoi Passenger Car JSC (Tân Long)	Minibus
126	Sơn Tây Bus Station Sơn Tây ward	↔	Trung Hà (Vật Lại Commune)	5:00 - 20:00 every day	20-25 min	34 km (21 miles)	15,000 ₫	Hà Tây Passenger Car JSC	Minibus

Route	Termini			Operation time	Frequency	Average length	Fare	Operation unit	Notes
BRT01	Yên Nghĩa Bus Station Yên Nghĩa ward	↔	Kim Mã Bus Station Giảng Võ ward	5:00 - 22:00 every day	3-5-7-8-10-15 min	14.65 km (9.10 miles)	8,000 ₫	Hanoi Express Bus Enterprise	Bus Rapid Transit

=== Eco-friendly bus routes ===
==== CNG (operated by Bảo Yến Tourism, Service and Construction Company Ltd.) ====
Route	Termini			Operation time	Frequency	Average length	Fare	Notes
142	Nam Thăng Long Bus Station Xuân Đỉnh ward	↔	Vincom Long Bien Phúc Lợi ward	5:00 - 21:00 every day	15-20 min	24.05 km (14.94 miles)	10,000 ₫	CNG
143	Hào Nam (Cát Linh Station) Ô Chợ Dừa ward	↔	Đông Anh Town (Đông Anh Commune)	5:00 - 22:00 every day	15-20 min	21.7 km (13.5 miles)	10,000 ₫	CNG
144	Hanoi University of Mining and Geology Đông Ngạc ward	↔	Trần Khánh Dư Bus Interchange Cửa Nam ward	5:00 - 21:00 every day	20-25 min	23.1 km (14.4 miles)	10,000 ₫	CNG
157	Mỹ Đình Bus Station Từ Liêm ward	↔	Sơn Tây Bus Station Sơn Tây ward	5:00 - 20:00 every day	15-20 min	40.5 km (25.2 miles)	20,000 ₫	CNG
157TC	Mỹ Đình Bus Station Từ Liêm ward	PR419 ↔	Sơn Tây Bus Station Sơn Tây ward	5:00 - 21:15 every day	15-20 min	40 km (25 miles)	20,000 ₫	CNG, Supplemental service
158	Yên Nghĩa Bus Station Yên Nghĩa ward	↔	Đặng Xá Urban Area Thuận An commune	5:00 - 21:00 every day	15-20 min	31.8 km (19.8 miles)	15,000 ₫	CNG
159	National Hospital for Tropical Diseases II Thiên Lộc commune	↔	Vinhomes Times City Vĩnh Tuy ward	5:00 - 21:00 every day	12-15 min	28.05 km (17.43 miles)	12,000 ₫	CNG
160	Kim Lũ (Đa Phúc Commune)	↔	Nam Thăng Long Bus Station Xuân Đỉnh ward	5:00 - 20:00 every day	15-20 min	32.75 km (20.35 miles)	15,000 ₫	CNG
161	Cầu Giấy Bus Interchange Láng ward	↔	Tam Hiệp (Đại Thanh Commune)	5:00 - 20:00 every day	15-30 min	16.1 km (10.0 miles)	10,000 ₫	CNG
162	Nhổn Bus Interchange (Hanoi University of Industry) Xuân Phuơng ward	↔	Thọ An (Thọ An Wharf) Liên Minh commune	5:20 - 19:30 every day	20-30 min	21.85 km (13.58 miles)	10,000 ₫	CNG
163	Yên Nghĩa Bus Station Yên Nghĩa ward	↔	Nhổn Bus Interchange (Hanoi University of Industry) Xuân Phuơng ward	5:00 - 19:00 every day	20-30 min	37.8 km (23.5 miles)	15,000 ₫	CNG

==== Electric bus routes ====
===== Transerco units =====
Route	Termini			Operation time	Frequency	Average length	Fare	Operation unit	Notes
05	Mai Động Hoàng Mai ward	↔	Hanoi University of Natural Resources and Environment Phú Diễn ward	5:00 - 21:25 every day	20-25-30 min	20.65 km (12.83 miles)	10,000 ₫	Southern Hanoi Passenger Car Enterprise	Switched to electric buses on Feb. 1st 2025.
11	Thống Nhất Park Hai Bà Trưng ward	↔	National University of Agriculture Gia Lâm commune	5:00 - 22:00 every day	10-15 min	18.75 km (11.65 miles)	10,000 ₫	Hanoi Bus Enterprise	11CT (Sat & Sun) does not go through Trần Nhân Tông walking street Switched to electric buses on May 22nd 2026.
12	Nghĩa Đô Park Nghĩa Đô ward	↔	Khánh Hà (Thường Tín Commune)	5:00 - 21:00 every day	12-20 min	23.4 km (14.5 miles)	10,000 ₫	Tân Đạt Center	Switched to electric buses on May 22nd 2026.
15	Gia Lâm Bus Station Bồ Đề ward	↔	Phố Nỉ (Bình An Trade Center) Trung Giã commune	Gia Lâm: 5:00 - 19:35; Phố Nỉ: 5:05 - 21:05 every day	10-20 min	37.8 km (23.5 miles)	15,000 ₫	Yên Viên Bus Enterprise	Connecting routes Switched to electric buses on Apr. 1st 2026.
16	Mỹ Đình Bus Station Từ Liêm ward	↔	Nước Ngầm Bus Station Yên Sở ward	4:40 - 21:20 every day	10 min	14.4 km (8.9 miles)	8,000 ₫	10-10 Bus Enterprise	Switched to electric buses on Apr. 18th 2026.
17	Long Biên Bus Interchange Ba Đình ward	↔	Nội Bài International Airport (Terminal T1) Nội Bài commune	5:00 - 22:00 every day	10-15 min	34.35 km (21.34 miles)	15,000 ₫	Yên Viên Bus Enterprise	Connecting routes Switched to electric buses on Apr. 1st 2026.
22A	Gia Lâm Bus Station Bồ Đề ward	↔	Kiến Hưng Urban Area Kiến Hưng ward	5:00 - 22:00 every day	9-20 min	18.3 km (11.4 miles)	10,000 ₫	Cầu Bươu Bus Enterprise	Switched to electric buses on Oct. 5th 2026.
22B	Giáp Bát Bus Station Hoàng Mai ward	↔	Đô Nghĩa; Đô Nghĩa Urban Area Yên Nghĩa ward	5:00 - 22:00 every day	21-23-24-25-26 min	16.1 km (10.0 miles)	10,000 ₫	Cầu Bươu Bus Enterprise	Branch route Switched to electric buses on Oct. 5th 2026.
24	Long Biên Bus Interchange Ba Đình ward	↔	Cầu Giấy Bus Interchange Láng ward	5:00 - 22:00 every day	12-20 min	16.2 km (10.1 miles)	10,000 ₫	10-10 Bus Enterprise	Switched to electric buses on Apr. 18th 2026.
26	Mai Động Hoàng Mai ward	↔	Mỹ Đình National Stadium Từ Liêm ward	5:00 - 22:00 every day	5-15 min	17.35 km (10.78 miles)	10,000 ₫	Southern Hanoi Passenger Car Enterprise	
29	Giáp Bát Bus Station Hoàng Mai ward	↔	Tân Lập (Ô Diên Commune)	5:00 - 21:00 every day	11-20 min	23.95 km (14.88 miles)	10,000 ₫	10-10 Bus Enterprise	Switched to electric buses on Apr. 18th 2026.
30	Gamuda Gardens Hoàng Mai ward	↔	Mỹ Đình Bus Station Từ Liêm ward	5:00 - 21:00 every day	14-18 min	20.9 km (13.0 miles)	10,000 ₫	Southern Hanoi Passenger Car Enterprise	30CT (Sat & Sun) does not go through Trần Nhân Tông walking street Switched to electric buses on Oct. 6th 2026.
34	Mỹ Đình Bus Station Từ Liêm ward	↔	Gia Lâm Bus Station Bồ Đề ward	4:50 - 21:35 every day	8-9-10 min	17.7 km (11.0 miles)	10,000 ₫	Hanoi Electric Vehicle JSC	Switched to electric buses on Apr. 1st 2025.
36	Long Biên Bus Interchange Ba Đình ward	↔	Yên Xá (Thanh Liệt Ward)	5:00 - 21:00 every day	14-20 min	17.46 km (10.85 miles)	10,000 ₫	Hanoi Bus Enterprise	Switched to electric buses on Apr. 1st 2026.
38	Tân Xuân (Đông Ngạc Ward)	↔	Mai Động (Hoàng Mai Ward)	5:00 - 21:00 every day	18-22 min	19.4 km (12.1 miles)	10,000 ₫	Southern Hanoi Passenger Car Enterprise	
39	Nghĩa Đô Park Nghĩa Đô ward	↔	Mai Động (Hoàng Mai Ward)	5:00 - 21:20 every day	15-20 min	25.4 km (15.8 miles)	12,000 ₫	Southern Hanoi Passenger Car Enterprise	Switched to electric buses on Jan. 18th 2025.
41	Nam Thăng Long Bus Station Xuân Đỉnh ward	↔	Giáp Bát Bus Station Hoàng Mai ward	5:00 - 21:02 every day	10-20 min	20.6 km (12.8 miles)	10,000 ₫	Hanoi Electric Vehicle JSC	Connecting routes
47A	Long Biên Bus Interchange Ba Đình ward	↔	Bát Tràng Pottery Village Bát Tràng commune	5:00 - 21:30 every day	20 min	17.8 km (11.1 miles)	10,000 ₫	Newway Transportation JSC	Connecting routes Switched to electric buses on Jan. 18th 2025.
47B	National Economics University Bạch Mai ward	↔	Kiêu Kỵ (Gia Lâm Commune)	5:00 - 20:45 every day	20-25-30 min	29.4 km (18.3 miles)	12,000 ₫	Newway Transportation JSC	Branch route Switched to electric buses on Jan. 18th 2025.
50	Long Biên Bus Interchange Ba Đình ward	↔	Anlac Green Symphony Sơn Đồng commune	5:00 - 21:10 every day	14-17 min	23.55 km (14.63 miles)	10,000 ₫	Southern Hanoi Passenger Car Enterprise	Switched to electric buses on Oct. 6th 2026.
54	Long Biên Bus Interchange Ba Đình ward	↔	Bắc Ninh; Kinh Bắc Cultural Center Vũ Ninh ward, Bắc Ninh province	4:30 - 21:05 every day	10-15 min	31.1 km (19.3 miles)	15,000 ₫	Yên Viên Bus Enterprise	Connecting routes Switched to electric buses on May 14th 2026.
83	Gia Lâm Bus Station Bồ Đề ward	↔	Hưng Yên Bus Station Phố Hiến ward, Hưng Yên	5:00 - 19:30 every day	20-25-30 min	58 km (36 miles)	20,000 ₫	Yên Viên Bus Enterprise	Began operation on Oct. 9th 2026.
90	Hào Nam (Cát Linh Station) Ô Chợ Dừa ward	↔	Nội Bài International Airport (Terminal T2) Nội Bài commune	5:30 - 22:30 every day	15-20 min	30.6 km (19.0 miles)	15,000 ₫	Yên Viên Bus Enterprise	Connecting routes

===== Other units =====
Route	Termini			Operation time	Frequency	Average length	Fare	Operation unit	Notes
08A	Long Biên Bus Interchange Ba Đình ward	↔	Đông Mỹ (Nam Phù Commune)	5:00 - 22:30 every day	10-15 min	18.6 km (11.6 miles)	10,000 ₫	Liên Ninh Transportation and Service JSC	08ACT (~16:00 Fri - 24:00 Sun) does not go through Hoàn Kiếm Lake
08B	Long Biên Bus Interchange Ba Đình ward	↔	Vạn Phúc (Nam Phù Commune)	5:00 - 20:50 every day	20 min	22.3 km (13.9 miles)	10,000 ₫	Liên Ninh Transportation and Service JSC	Branch route 08BCT (~16:00 Fri - 24:00 Sun) does not go through Hoàn Kiếm Lake Switched to electric buses on Dec. 12th 2025.
09A	Trần Khánh Dư Bus Interchange Cửa Nam ward	↔	Hanoi University of Mining and Geology Đông Ngạc ward	5:00 - 21:35	15-20 min	18.5 km (11.5 miles)	10,000 ₫	Liên Ninh Transportation and Service JSC	Switched to electric buses on Dec. 12th 2025.
09B	Trần Khánh Dư Bus Interchange Cửa Nam ward	↔	Mỹ Đình Bus Station Từ Liêm ward	5:00 - 21:30	16 min	14.2 km (8.8 miles)	8,000 ₫	Liên Ninh Transportation and Service JSC	Branch route Switched to electric buses on Dec. 12th 2025.
19	Trần Khánh Dư Bus Interchange Cửa Nam ward	↔	Academy of Policy and Development An Khánh commune	5:00 - 21:35 every day	10-20 min	26.4 km (16.4 miles)	12,000 ₫	Liên Ninh Transportation and Service JSC	Switched to electric buses on Dec. 24th 2025.
21A	Giáp Bát Bus Station Hoàng Mai ward	↔	Yên Nghĩa Bus Station Yên Nghĩa ward	5:00 - 21:00 every day	10-20 min	16.25 km (10.10 miles)	10,000 ₫	Liên Ninh Transportation and Service JSC	Switched to electric buses on Dec. 12th 2025.
21B	Duyên Thái (Hồng Vân Commune)	↔	Mỹ Đình Bus Station Từ Liêm ward	5:00 - 21:00 every day	7-15 min	25.2 km (15.7 miles)	12,000 ₫	Liên Ninh Transportation and Service JSC	Branch route Switched to electric buses on December 2025.
37	Giáp Bát Bus Station Hoàng Mai ward	↔	Chương Mỹ Ward	5:00 - 21:30 every day	10-20 min	22.85 km (14.20 miles)	10,000 ₫	Liên Ninh Transportation and Service JSC	Connecting routes Switched to electric buses on Dec. 16th 2025.
125	Giáp Bát Bus Station Hoàng Mai ward	↔	Vân Đình Commune	5:00 - 20:00 every day	20-25 min	43.8 km (27.2 miles)	20,000 ₫	Liên Ninh Transportation and Service JSC	Switched to electric buses on Dec. 31st 2025.
59	Thư Lâm Commune	↔	Yên Sở Hoàng Mai ward	5:00 - 21:00 every day	10-15 min	38.2 km (23.7 miles)	15,000 ₫	Bảo Yến Tourism, Service and Construction Company Ltd.	Connecting routes Switched to electric buses on Jan. 18th 2025.
60A	Pháp Vân - Tứ Hiệp Urban Area Yên Sở ward	↔	Hồ Tây Waterpark Tây Hồ ward	5:00 - 21:00 every day	10-20 min	25.5 km (15.8 miles)	12,000 ₫	Bảo Yến Tourism, Service and Construction Company Ltd.	Switched to electric buses on Jan. 16th 2026.
60B	Nước Ngầm Bus Station Yên Sở ward	↔	Hanoi University of Finance and Banking Mê Linh commune	5:00 - 21:30 every day	10-15 min	32.7 km (20.3 miles)	15,000 ₫	Bảo Yến Tourism, Service and Construction Company Ltd.	Branch route Switched to electric buses on Jan. 16th 2026.
74	Mỹ Đình Bus Station Từ Liêm ward	↔	Xuân Khanh (Tùng Thiện Ward)	5:00 - 20:30 every day	10-15 min	52.2 km (32.4 miles)	20,000 ₫	Bảo Yến Tourism, Service and Construction Company Ltd.	Switched to electric buses on Apr. 2nd 2026.
49	Trần Khánh Dư Bus Interchange Cửa Nam ward	↔	Nhổn Bus Interchange Xuân Phuơng ward	5:00 - 21:00 every day	10-20 min	20.1 km (12.5 miles)	10,000 ₫	Hanoi Passenger Car JSC (Tân Long)	Switched to electric buses on Apr. 30th 2026.
71	Nghĩa Đô Park Nghĩa Đô ward	HLHTP ↔	VNU; HN04A Lecture Hall Area Hòa Lạc commune	5:00 - 21:00 every day	10-20 min	40 km (25 miles)	20,000 ₫	Hanoi Passenger Car JSC (Tân Long)	Soon to be subsidized
146	Hào Nam (Cát Linh Station) Ô Chợ Dừa ward	↔	Phù Đổng Commune	5:00 - 21:00 every day	10-15 min	25.25 km (15.69 miles)	10,000 ₫	Hanoi Passenger Car JSC (Tân Long)	146CT (~16:00 Fri - 24:00 Sun) does not go through Hoàn Kiếm Lake or Ring Road 1 low emission zone Switched to electric buses on Aug. 1st 2026.
46	Mỹ Đình Bus Station Từ Liêm ward	↔	Đông Anh Town (Đông Anh Commune)	Mỹ Đình: 5:40 - 21:00; Đông Anh: 5:00 - 19:55 every day	10-15 min	26.15 km (16.25 miles)	12,000 ₫	Đông Anh Transport, Trading and Tourism JSC	Connecting routes
72	Yên Nghĩa Bus Station Yên Nghĩa ward	↔	Xuân Mai Commune; CP Food Factory	5:00 - 21:00 every day	15-20 min	22.4 km (13.9 miles)	10,000 ₫	Hà Tây Automobile Transport JSC - Hà Thành Group	
43	Kim Mã Bus Station Giảng Võ ward	VEC ↔	Đông Anh Town (Đông Anh Commune)	5:00 - 21:00 every day	15-20 min	26 km (16 miles)	12,000 ₫	VinBus - Vingroup	Electric bus, Connecting routes Began operation on Jun. 5th 2025.
E01	Mỹ Đình Bus Station Từ Liêm ward	↔	Vinhomes Ocean Park Gia Lâm commune	5:00 - 21:00 every day	12-20 min	26.95 km (16.75 miles)	12,000 ₫	VinBus - Vingroup	Electric bus
E02	Hào Nam (Cát Linh Station) Ô Chợ Dừa ward	↔	Vinhomes Ocean Park Gia Lâm commune	5:00 - 22:10 every day	13-20 min	28 km (17 miles)	12,000 ₫	VinBus - Vingroup	Electric bus
E03	Mỹ Đình (Hàm Nghi); Cầu Diễn Medical Station Từ Liêm ward	↔	Vinhomes Ocean Park Gia Lâm commune	5:00 - 21:00 every day	12-20 min	31 km (19 miles)	15,000 ₫	VinBus - Vingroup	Electric bus
E04	Vinhomes Smart City Tây Mỗ ward	↔	Vincom Long Bien Phúc Lợi ward	5:00 - 21:30 every day	15-20 min	25 km (16 miles)	12,000 ₫	VinBus - Vingroup	Electric bus
E05	Long Biên Bus Interchange Ba Đình ward	Cầu Giấy ↔	Vinhomes Smart City Tây Mỗ ward	5:00 - 21:30 every day	15-20 min	20 km (12 miles)	10,000 ₫	VinBus - Vingroup	Electric bus
E06	Giáp Bát Bus Station Hoàng Mai ward	↔	Vinhomes Smart City Tây Mỗ ward	5:00 - 21:30 every day	15-20 min	23.65 km (14.70 miles)	10,000 ₫	VinBus - Vingroup	Electric bus
E06TC	Giáp Bát Bus Station Hoàng Mai ward	↔	Hòa Lạc Hi-tech Park (FPT University) Hòa Lạc commune	5:00 - 21:00 every day	15-45 min	45 km (28 miles)	20,000 ₫	VinBus - Vingroup	Electric bus Supplemental service connecting Hòa Lạc Hi-tech Park
E07	Long Biên Bus Interchange Ba Đình ward	Cửa Nam ↔	Vinhomes Smart City Tây Mỗ ward	5:00 - 21:30 every day	12-20 min	16 km (9.9 miles)	10,000 ₫	VinBus - Vingroup	Electric bus
E07TC	Long Biên Bus Interchange Ba Đình ward	↔	Hòa Lạc Hi-tech Park (FPT University) Hòa Lạc commune	5:00 - 21:00 every day	25-35 min	47 km (29 miles)	20,000 ₫	VinBus - Vingroup	Electric bus Supplemental service connecting Hòa Lạc Hi-tech Park
E08	Nam Thăng Long Bus Station Xuân Đỉnh ward	↔	Vinhomes Times City Vĩnh Tuy ward	5:00 - 21:10 every day	15-20 min	18.04 km (11.21 miles)	10,000 ₫	VinBus - Vingroup	Electric bus
E09	Vinhomes Smart City Tây Mỗ ward	↔	Võ Chí Công Inter-agency Area Tây Hồ ward	5:00 - 21:30 every day	15-20 min	22.95 km (14.26 miles)	10,000 ₫	VinBus - Vingroup	Electric bus
E10	Vinhomes Ocean Park Gia Lâm commune	↔	Nội Bài International Airport (Terminal T2) Nội Bài commune	5:00 - 22:10 every day	20 min	40.5 km (25.2 miles)	20,000 ₫	VinBus - Vingroup	Electric bus
E11	Yên Phụ (Long Biên Bus Interchange) Ba Đình ward	Hoàn Kiếm Lake ↔ Hồ Tây	Yên Phụ (Long Biên Bus Interchange) Ba Đình ward	5:00 - 21:05 every day	20 min	25 km (16 miles)	12,000 ₫	VinBus - Vingroup	Electric bus, Loop route Began operation on Aug. 18th 2025.
SMC1	Vincom Mega Mall Smart City Tây Mỗ ward	↔	Vincom Mega Mall Smart City Tây Mỗ ward	5:00 - 22:10 every day	6-10 min	10 km (6.2 miles)	Free	VinBus - Vingroup	Electric bus, Internal route, 1-way loop route
OCP1	Vincom Mega Mall Ocean Park Gia Lâm commune	↔	Vincom Mega Mall Ocean Park Gia Lâm commune	5:00 - 23:59 every day	15-30 min	27 km (17 miles)	Free	VinBus - Vingroup	Electric bus, Internal route, Connecting routes, 1-way loop route
OCP2	Vincom Mega Mall Ocean Park 2 Nghĩa Trụ commune, Hưng Yên province	↔	Vincom Mega Mall Ocean Park 2 Nghĩa Trụ commune, Hưng Yên province	6:00 - 23:59 every day	15-30 min	10 km (6.2 miles)	Free	VinBus - Vingroup	Electric bus, Internal route, 1-way loop route
OCT1	Vincom Royal City Thanh Xuân commune	Times City ↔	Vinhomes Ocean Park Nghĩa Trụ commune, Hưng Yên province	6:00 - 23:59 every day	15-30 min	31 km (19 miles)	Free	VinBus - Vingroup	Electric bus
OCT2	Hoàn Kiếm Lake / Opera House Hoàn Kiếm ward	↔	Vinhomes Ocean Park Nghĩa Trụ commune, Hưng Yên province	6:05 - 23:59 every day	15-30 min	28 km (17 miles)	Free	VinBus - Vingroup	Electric bus
NIA	Nội Bài International Airport (Terminal T1) Nội Bài commune	↔	Nội Bài International Airport (Terminal T2) Nội Bài commune	5:00 - 1:30 next day every day	15-30 min	2 km (1.2 miles)	Free	VinBus - Vingroup	Electric bus, Internal route, Shuttle bus

=== Non-subsidized & provincial bus routes ===
==== Non-subsidized city routes ====
Route	Termini			Operation time	Frequency	Average length	Fare	Operation unit	Notes
70A	Mỹ Đình Bus Station Từ Liêm ward	↔	Trung Hà (Vật Lại Commune)	5:00 - 15:20 every day	20-30 min	54.1 km (33.6 miles)	20,000 ₫-30,000 ₫ (section); 40,000 ₫ (whole route)	Hà Tây Passenger Car JSC	
70B	Mỹ Đình Bus Station Từ Liêm ward	↔	Phú Cường (Cổ Đô Commune)	5:00 - 15:20 every day	20-30 min	59.78 km (37.15 miles)	20,000 ₫-30,000 ₫ (section); 40,000 ₫ (whole route)	Hà Tây Passenger Car JSC	
71	Nghĩa Đô Park Nghĩa Đô ward	HLHTP ↔	VNU; HN04A Lecture Hall Area Hòa Lạc commune	Nghĩa Đô Park: 5:20 - 18:30; VNU: 6:30 - 18:30 every day	15-25-30-45 min	45.2 km (28.1 miles)	15,000 ₫-25,000 ₫ (section); 40,000 ₫ (whole route)	Hanoi Passenger Car JSC (Tân Long)	Express shuttle route on between campuses Soon to be subsidized
78	Mỹ Đình Bus Station Từ Liêm ward	↔	Tế Tiêu Bus Station Mỹ Đức commune	4:30 - 18:30 every day	15-20 min	44.31 km (27.53 miles)	10,000 ₫-25,000 ₫-30,000 ₫ (section); 35,000 ₫ (whole route)	Bảo Châu Transport and Service JSC	

==== Provincial routes ====
Distinguished by its large numbering (commonly over 200), these routes connect Hanoi with nearby provinces.

Route	Termini			Operation time	Frequency	Average length	Fare	Operation unit	Notes
202	Gia Lâm Bus Station Bồ Đề ward	↔	Hải Dương Bus Station Thành Đông ward, Hải Phòng	5:00 - 19:00 every day	15 min	57.8 km (35.9 miles)	30,000 ₫ (section); 60,000 ₫ (whole route); 10,000 ₫ (within Hải Dương)	Hanoi Passenger Car JSC (Tân Long)	
202	Gia Lâm Bus Station Bồ Đề ward	↔	Hải Dương Bus Station Thành Đông ward, Hải Phòng	5:00 - 19:00 every day	15 min	57.8 km (35.9 miles)	30,000 ₫ (section); 60,000 ₫ (whole route); 10,000 ₫ (within Hải Dương)	Hải Hưng Passenger Transport Automobile JSC; Seoul Joint Venture JSC	
203	Giáp Bát Bus Station Hoàng Mai ward	↔	Bắc Giang Bus Station Bắc Giang ward, Bắc Ninh	5:00 - 18:00 every day	20 min	61.93 km (38.48 miles)	10,000 ₫-15,000 ₫-25,000 ₫-40,000 ₫-50,000 ₫ (section); 65,000 ₫ (whole route)	Bắc Hà Passenger Transport JSC	
204	Long Biên Bus Interchange Ba Đình ward	↔	Thuận Thành Ward Bắc Ninh	5:20 - 18:00 every day	15-30 min	34.87 km (21.67 miles)	20,000 ₫ (section); 40,000 ₫ (whole route)	Hanoi Passenger Car JSC (Tân Long)	
205	Gia Lâm Bus Station Bồ Đề ward	↔	Hưng Yên Bus Station Phố Hiến ward, Hưng Yên	04:45 - 19:05 every day	15-30 min	67.42 km (41.89 miles)	25,000 ₫-35,000 ₫ (section); 60,000 ₫ (whole route)	Hanoi Passenger Car JSC (Tân Long); Phượng Hoàng Transport Group JSC	
206	Giáp Bát Bus Station Hoàng Mai ward	↔	Phủ Lý Bus Station Phủ Lý ward, Ninh Bình	4:30 - 20:30 every day	20 min	60.4 km (37.5 miles)	15,000 ₫-30,000 ₫-40,000₫ (section); 42,000 ₫-55,000₫ (whole route)	Hà Nam Automobile Transport JSC	
207	Gia Lâm Bus Station Bồ Đề ward	↔	Triều Dương Bus Station Tiên Lữ commune, Hưng Yên	4:50 - 18:00 every day	30-40 min	70.29 km (43.68 miles)	—N/a	Phù Cừ Passenger Transport Company Ltd.	
208	Giáp Bát Bus Station Hoàng Mai ward	↔	Hưng Yên Bus Station Phố Hiến ward, Hưng Yên	5:00 - 17:20 every day	50 min	80.2 km (49.8 miles)	30,000 ₫-40,000 ₫ (section); 55,000 ₫ (whole route)	Hải Hưng Passenger Transport Automobile JSC - Hưng Yên Branch	
209	Giáp Bát Bus Station Hoàng Mai ward	↔	Triều Dương Bus Station Tiên Lữ commune, Hưng Yên	6:15 - 17:30 every day	60-70 min	63.91 km (39.71 miles)	20,000 ₫-25,000 ₫-45,000 ₫-60,000 ₫ (section); 70,000 ₫ (whole route)	Xuân Minh Hưng Yên Company Ltd.	
210	Gia Lâm Bus Station Bồ Đề ward	↔	Hiệp Hòa Bus Station Hiệp Hòa commune, Bắc Ninh	4:20 - 19:30 every day	30 min	45.49 km (28.27 miles)	20,000 ₫-25,000 ₫-30,000 ₫-40,000 ₫-45,000 ₫-60,000 ₫ (section); 70,000 ₫ (whole route)	Mến Hiếu Transport Company Ltd.	
212	Mỹ Đình Bus Station Từ Liêm ward	Quế Võ Bus Station ↔	Phù Lãng Commune Bắc Ninh	5:00 - 18:00 every day	20 min	80.97 km (50.31 miles)	20,000 ₫-50,000 ₫ (section); 70,000 ₫ (Mỹ Đình ↔ Quế Võ Bus Station); 30,000 ₫ (extension from Quế Võ to Phù Lãng or Đồng Việt)	Hanoi Passenger Car JSC (Tân Long)	
212TC	Mỹ Đình Bus Station Từ Liêm ward	Quế Võ Bus Station ↔	Đồng Việt Wharf Đồng Việt commune, Bắc Ninh	5:00 - 18:15 every day	15-20-25-30-60 min	90.22 km (56.06 miles)	20,000 ₫-50,000 ₫ (section); 70,000 ₫ (Mỹ Đình ↔ Quế Võ Bus Station); 30,000 ₫ (extension from Quế Võ to Phù Lãng or Đồng Việt)	Hanoi Passenger Car JSC (Tân Long)	Branch route, Supplemental service
213	Yên Nghĩa Bus Station Yên Nghĩa ward	↔	Bình An Bus Station Tân Hòa ward, Phú Thọ	4:50 - 19:30 every day	10-15-20 min	67.8 km (42.1 miles)	20,000 ₫-25,000 ₫-30,000 ₫-35,000 ₫-40,000 ₫-50,000 ₫ (section); 70,000 ₫ (whole route)	Sông Đà Transport Cooperative; Hà Tây Passenger Car JSC	
214	Yên Nghĩa Bus Station Yên Nghĩa ward	↔	Phủ Lý Bus Station Phủ Lý ward, Ninh Bình	5:20 - 17:20 every day	60-75 min	68.54 km (42.59 miles)	15,000 ₫-35,000 ₫ (section); 45,000 ₫ (whole route)	Hà Nam Automobile Transport JSC	
215	Mỹ Đình Bus Station Từ Liêm ward	↔	Trực Ninh Bus Station Cổ Lễ commune, Ninh Bình	5:00 - 20:00 every day	30 min	107.86 km (67.02 miles)	140,000 ₫ (whole route) 50,000 ₫ (within section) - 100,000 ₫ (connecting section) - 120,000 ₫ (1 section apart); 100,000 ₫ (Mỹ Đình ↔ Bạch Mai Hospital 2); 140,000 ₫ (Mỹ Đình ↔ Nam Định)	Hanoi Passenger Car JSC (Tân Long); Đại Duy Car Co. Ltd.	Began operation on Jan. 26th 2024.
215B	Mỹ Đình Bus Station Từ Liêm ward	Hải Hậu ↔	Trực Ninh Bus Station Cổ Lễ commune, Ninh Bình	3:30 - 20:00 every day	30 min	142.73 km (88.69 miles)	150,000 ₫ (whole route) 50,000 ₫ (within section) - 100,000 ₫ (connecting section) - 130,000 ₫ (1 section apart); 100,000 ₫ (Mỹ Đình ↔ Liêm Tuyền); 130,000 ₫ (Mỹ Đình ↔ Ý Yên)	Hanoi Passenger Car JSC (Tân Long); Đại Duy Car Co. Ltd.	Branch route Began operation on Jul. 17th 2025.

=== Discontinued services ===
These routes either changed their numbers, merged with other routes or went defunct.

Number	Termini			Operation time	Final avg. length	Type	Note/Reason
10A	Long Biên Bus Interchange Trúc Bạch, Ba Đình	↔	Từ Sơn; Từ Sơn General Hospital Bắc Ninh province	5:00 - 21:00 every day	17.9 km (11.1 miles)		Discontinued from Apr. 1st 2024 due to high subsidy rate.
10B	Long Biên Bus Interchange Trúc Bạch, Ba Đình	↔	Trung Mầu Commune (Gia Lâm District)	5:00 - 21:00 every day	25.1 km (15.6 miles)	Branch route	Discontinued from Apr. 1st 2024 due to high subsidy rate.
14	Hoàn Kiếm Lake Hàng Bạc, Hoàn Kiếm	↔	Cổ Nhuế Đông Ngạc, Bắc Từ Liêm	5:00 - 21:00 (Mon - Thu) 5:00 - 15:50 (Fri)	14.5 km (9.0 miles)		Discontinued from Apr. 1st 2024 due to high subsidy rate.
14CT	Trần Khánh Dư Bus Interchange Phan Chu Trinh, Hoàn Kiếm	↔	Cổ Nhuế Đông Ngạc, Bắc Từ Liêm	17:00 - 21:03 (Fri) 5:01 - 21:03 (Sat, Sun)	15.9 km (9.9 miles)		Discontinued from Apr. 1st 2024 due to high subsidy rate.
18	National Economics University Đồng Tâm, Hai Bà Trưng	Long Biên ↔ Chùa Bộc	National Economics University Đồng Tâm, Hai Bà Trưng	5:00 - 21:00 every day	19.6 km (12.2 miles)	Loop route	Discontinued from Apr. 1st 2024 due to high subsidy rate.
44	Trần Khánh Dư Bus Interchange Phan Chu Trinh, Hoàn Kiếm	↔	Mỹ Đình Bus Station Mỹ Đình 2, Nam Từ Liêm	5:00 - 21:00 every day	14.5 km (9.0 miles)		Discontinued from Apr. 1st 2024 due to high subsidy rate.
145	BigC Thang Long Trade Complex Trung Hoà, Cầu Giấy	↔	Hồ Tây Waterpark Nhật Tân, Tây Hồ	5:00 - 22:00 every day	16.8 km (10.4 miles)	Minibus	Discontinued from Apr. 1st 2024 due to high subsidy rate.
16A	Giáp Bát Bus Station Giáp Bát, Hoàng Mai	↔	Mỹ Đình Bus Station Mỹ Đình 2, Nam Từ Liêm	Giáp Bát: 5:15 - 21:15; Mỹ Đình: 5:05 - 21h15 (Mon - Sat) Giáp Bát: 5:20 - 20:50; Mỹ Đình: 5:20 - 21:00 (Sunday)	13.7 km (8.5 miles)		On Sep. 25th 2014, Route 16 (Mỹ Đình ↔ Giáp Bát) was split into branch routes 16A (same route) and 16B (Mỹ Đình ↔ Nước Ngầm). Somewhere in between Dec. 2016 and Jan. 2017, those branch routes were merged back to the current Route 16 running 16B's route.
207 (section)	Giáp Bát Bus Station Giáp Bát, Hoàng Mai	↔	Văn Giang District (Hưng Yên province)	5:00 - 19:00 everyday	—N/a	Provincial routes	A portion of the route was merged into Route 208. Route 207 now ends at Gia Lâm Bus Station.
211	Mỹ Đình Bus Station Mỹ Đình 2, Nam Từ Liêm	↔	Vĩnh Yên (Vĩnh Phúc province)	5:00 - 19:00 every day	—N/a	Provincial routes	Began operation on Aug. 7th 2018. In December 2018, there was a news report of the route operating without its operator, Đông Anh Transport, Trading and Tourism JSC, finishing all necessary paperworks. Now that the route has been discontinued, it is barred from ever operating again.
Fast routes: Experimental services running on normal routes, with less stops to ensure shorter trip time.							carried out on routes 02, 08, 16, 27, 28, 32, 54
03C	Gia Lâm Bus Station Gia Thụy, Long Biên	↔	Nước Ngầm Bus Station Hoàng Liệt, Hoàng Mai	5:00 - 20:00 every day	—N/a	Branch route	These fast bus routes connecting major bus stations in Hanoi began operation on Jul. 1st 2013 during the University - College examination.
30B	Mỹ Đình Bus Station Mỹ Đình 2, Nam Từ Liêm	↔	Yên Nghĩa Bus Station Yên Nghĩa, Hà Đông	5:00 - 20:00 every day	—N/a	Branch route	These fast bus routes connecting major bus stations in Hanoi began operation on Jul. 1st 2013 during the University - College examination.
30B	Giáp Bát Bus Station Giáp Bát, Hoàng Mai	Nước Ngầm ↔	Yên Nghĩa Bus Station Yên Nghĩa, Hà Đông	5:00 - 20:00 every day	—N/a	Branch route	These fast bus routes connecting major bus stations in Hanoi began operation on Jul. 1st 2013 during the University - College examination.
20A (old)	Cầu Giấy Bus Interchange Láng Thượng, Đống Đa	NR32 ↔	Phùng Bus Station Phùng, Đan Phượng	5:10 - 20:00 every day	—N/a	Branch route	On Apr. 23rd 2020, Route 20A was merged into Route 20B (Cầu Giấy ↔ Sơn Tây) to form New Route 20A, Route 20C was renumbered to 20B and extended from Võng Xuyên to Sơn Tây.
20C	Nhổn Bus Interchange (Hanoi University of Industry) Minh Khai, Bắc Từ Liêm	↔	Võng Xuyên Commune (Phúc Thọ District)	Nhổn: 5:23 - 18:08; Võng Xuyên: 5:23 - 19:38 every day	33.7 km (20.9 miles)	Branch route	On Apr. 23rd 2020, Route 20A was merged into Route 20B (Cầu Giấy ↔ Sơn Tây) to form New Route 20A, Route 20C was renumbered to 20B and extended from Võng Xuyên to Sơn Tây.
27TC	Yên Nghĩa Bus Station Yên Nghĩa, Hà Đông	↔	Võ Chí Công Inter-agency Area Xuân La, Tây Hồ	Yên Nghĩa: 5:46 - 7:28; Inter-agency Area: 16:30 - 18:18 every day	19.2 km (11.9 miles)		Supplemental service for workers and civil servants from the inter-agency area, stopping only at certain stops; Began operation in late 2020. Now becoming obsolete.
40A	Thống Nhất Park Lê Đại Hành, Hai Bà Trưng	↔	Như Quỳnh Văn Lâm, Hưng Yên province	5:00 - 22:00 every day	23 km (14 miles)		On Jan. 1st 2018, Routes 40A and 40B (Thống Nhất Park ↔ Văn Lâm) were merged to form the current Route 40 running 40B's route.
50B	Long Biên Bus Interchange Trúc Bạch, Ba Đình	↔	An Khánh Industrial Park An Khánh, Hoài Đức	5:00 - 21:00 every day	—N/a	Branch route	On Feb. 5th 2010, branch route 50B began operation. It was later dropped due to it being ineffective.
56C	Nam Thăng Long Bus Station Xuân Đỉnh, Nam Từ Liêm	↔	Bắc Phú Ward (Sóc Sơn District)	Nam Thăng Long: 5:00 - 21:00; Bắc Phú: 5:00 - 21:05 (Mon - Sat) Nam Thăng Long: 4:45 - 20:45; Bắc Phú: 5:00 - 20:35 (Sunday)	32.4 km (20.1 miles)	Branch route	Discontinued from Apr. 20th 2017 as 56C merged into 56B.
70C	Mỹ Đình Bus Station Mỹ Đình 2, Nam Từ Liêm	↔	Trung Hà Bus Station Thái Hà, Ba Vì	—			
71A	Mỹ Đình Bus Station Mỹ Đình 2, Nam Từ Liêm	↔	Sơn Tây Bus Station Quang Trung, Sơn Tây	5:00 - 18:00 every day	45 km (28 miles)		Discontinued due to their ineffectiveness. Route 71 was revived on Jun. 1st 2024 with the route now going from Nghĩa Đô Park to VNU in Hòa Lạc. It's expected to be subsidized in July 2026.
71B	Mỹ Đình Bus Station Mỹ Đình 2, Nam Từ Liêm	↔	Xuân Mai Town (Chương Mỹ District)	5:00 - 18:00 every day	44.6 km (27.7 miles)	Branch route	Discontinued due to their ineffectiveness. Route 71 was revived on Jun. 1st 2024 with the route now going from Nghĩa Đô Park to VNU in Hòa Lạc. It's expected to be subsidized in July 2026.
73	Mỹ Đình Bus Station Mỹ Đình 2, Nam Từ Liêm	↔	Thầy Temple Sài Sơn, Quốc Oai	5:00 - 18:00 every day	20.8 km (12.9 miles)		
75	Yên Nghĩa Bus Station Yên Nghĩa, Hà Đông	↔	Hương Sơn Bus Station Hương Sơn, Mỹ Đức	5:00 - 17:00 every day	46 km (29 miles)		
76	Sơn Tây Bus Station Quang Trung, Sơn Tây	↔	Trung Hà Thái Hoà, Ba Vì	5:00 - 18:00 every day	21 km (13 miles)		
77	Yên Nghĩa Bus Station Yên Nghĩa, Hà Đông	↔	Sơn Tây Bus Station Quang Trung, Sơn Tây	5:00 - 17:00 every day	45.7 km (28.4 miles)		This route was probably reopened as the subsidized route 89.
79	Sơn Tây Bus Station Quang Trung, Sơn Tây	↔	Đá Chông Minh Quang, Ba Vì	5:00 - 18:00 every day	21.9 km (13.6 miles)		This route was reopened as the subsidized route 110.
80	Mỹ Đình Bus Station Mỹ Đình 2, Nam Từ Liêm	↔	Kinh Đào An Mỹ, Mỹ Đức	5:15 - 18:05 every day	—N/a		Discontinued from Apr. 9th 2018.
81	Xuân Mai Town (Chương Mỹ District)	↔	Hương Sơn Bus Station Hương Sơn, Mỹ Đức	—			
43 (old)	Thống Nhất Park Lê Đại Hành, Hai Bà Trưng	↔	Đông Anh Town (Đông Anh District)	5:00 - 20:00 every day	26.3 km (16.3 miles)	Connecting routes	Discontinued from Feb. 1st 2025 as the license with Hải Vân International Shipping Joint Venture Company got suspended, and also for TRAMOC to rationalize bus routes and improve service quality. Route 43 was revived on Jun. 5th 2025, running the Kim Mã - Đông Anh route with VinBus operating.
45	Vinhomes Times City Vĩnh Tuy, Hai Bà Trưng	↔	Nam Thăng Long Bus Station Xuân Đỉnh, Nam Từ Liêm	Times City: 5:00 - 19:45; Nam Thăng Long: 5:20 - 20:00 every day	17.8 km (11.1 miles)		Discontinued from Apr. 1st 2025.
22B (old)	Mỹ Đình Bus Station Mỹ Đình 2, Nam Từ Liêm	↔	Kiến Hưng Urban Area Kiến Hưng, Hà Đông	5:00 - 22:30 every day	12.85 km (7.98 miles)	Branch route	Merged into Route 22A on Apr. 1st 2025.
52B	Thống Nhất Park Lê Đại Hành, Hai Bà Trưng	↔	Đặng Xá Commune (Gia Lâm)	Thống Nhất Park: 5:06 - 20:55; Đặng Xá: 5:06 - 20:55 every day	22.3 km (13.9 miles)	Branch route	Merged with 52A into Route 52 on Apr. 1st 2025.
55A	Vinhomes Times City Vĩnh Tuy, Hai Bà Trưng	↔	Cầu Giấy Bus Interchange Láng Thượng, Đống Đa	Times City: 5:25 - 20:50; Cầu Giấy: 5:00 - 19:42 every day	18.3 km (11.4 miles)		Merged with 55B into Route 55 on Apr. 1st 2025.
HLX1	Vinhomes Times City Vĩnh Tuy ward	↔	Hạ Long Xanh (Sales Office) Tuần Châu ward, Quảng Ninh province	Times City: 7:00, 7:15; Hạ Long: 13:00, 13:15; Mon - Fri	150 km (93 miles)	Electric bus	Discontinued from Sep. 1st 2026.
HLX2	Vinhomes Ocean Park Gia Lâm commune	↔	Hạ Long Xanh (Sales Office) Tuần Châu ward, Quảng Ninh province	Ocean Park: 13:00, 13:15; Hạ Long: 17:00, 17:15; Mon - Fri	150 km (93 miles)	Electric bus	Discontinued from Sep. 1st 2026.

==== Special routes for special events ====
===== Routes serving the 2019 Huong Pagoda Festival (Feb. 16th to Mar. 15th) =====
Number	Termini			Operation time	Final avg. length	Type
01B	Gia Lâm Bus Station Gia Thụy, Long Biên	↔	Hương Pagoda Hương Sơn, Mỹ Đức	Gia Lâm: 4:00 - 14:30; Hương Pagoda: 9:30 - 17:30 every day		Branch route
107B	Kim Mã Bus Station Kim Mã, Ba Đình	↔	Hương Pagoda Hương Sơn, Mỹ Đức	Kim Mã: 4:00 - 16:00; Hương Pagoda: 11:00 - 19:00 every day		Branch route

===== Routes connecting Vietnam Exposition Center (VEC) for the National Achievements Exhibition in celebration of the 80th National Day (Aug. 12th to Sep. 15th) =====
Number	Termini			Operation time	Final avg. length	Type	Note
32TC1	Giáp Bát Bus Station Hoàng Mai ward	↔	Vietnam Exposition Center Đông Anh commune	7:00 - 22:00 every day	19.5 km (12.1 miles)	Supplemental service, Branch route	Began operation on Aug. 12th 2025
34TC	Mỹ Đình Bus Station Từ Liêm ward	VEC ↔	Gia Lâm Bus Station Bồ Đề ward	7:00 - 21:05 every day (before Aug. 28th) 7:00 - 21:35 every day (from Aug. 28th)	28 km (17 miles)	Supplemental service, Branch route	Began operation on Aug. 12th 2025
43TC	Kim Mã Bus Station Giảng Võ ward	↔	Vietnam Exposition Center Đông Anh commune	7:00 - 22:10 every day	18 km (11 miles)	Electric bus, Supplemental service, Branch route	Began operation on Aug. 12th 2025
96TC	Cầu Giấy Bus Interchange Láng ward	↔	Vietnam Exposition Center Đông Anh commune	7:00 - 21:00 every day	19.35 km (12.02 miles)	Supplemental service, Branch route	Began operation on Aug. 12th 2025
122TC	Gia Lâm Bus Station Bồ Đề ward	VEC ↔	Bắc Thăng Long Industrial Zone Thiên Lộc commune	5:00 - 21:00 every day	31.9 km (19.8 miles)	Minibus, Supplemental service, Branch route	Began operation on Aug. 12th 2025
E10TC	Vinhomes Ocean Park Gia Lâm commune	Cổ Linh ↔	Vietnam Exposition Center Đông Anh commune	7:00 - 22:10 every day	19.8 km (12.3 miles)	Electric bus, Supplemental service, Branch route	Began operation on Aug. 12th 2025
02TC	Yên Nghĩa Bus Station Yên Nghĩa ward	↔	Vietnam Exposition Center Đông Anh commune	6:00 - 21:30 every day	28.4 km (17.6 miles)	Supplemental service, Branch route	Began operation on Aug. 28th 2025
15TC	Vietnam Exposition Center Đông Anh commune	↔	Phố Nỉ (Bình An Trade Center) Trung Giã commune	6:57 - 19:20 every day	27.35 km (16.99 miles)	Supplemental service, Branch route	Began operation on Aug. 28th 2025
23TC	Hanoi Railway Station Văn Miếu - Quốc Tử Giám ward	↔	Vietnam Exposition Center Đông Anh commune	5:00 - 21:15 every day	21.8 km (13.5 miles)	Supplemental service, Branch route	Began operation on Aug. 28th 2025
24TC	Gamuda Gardens Hoàng Mai ward	↔	Vietnam Exposition Center Đông Anh commune	5:30 - 21:30 every day	17.8 km (11.1 miles)	Supplemental service, Branch route	Began operation on Aug. 28th 2025
31TC1	Hanoi University of Science and Technology Bạch Mai ward	↔	Vietnam Exposition Center Đông Anh commune	5:00 - 21:15 every day	16.75 km (10.41 miles)	Supplemental services, Branch routes	Began operation on Aug. 28th 2025
31TC2	Vietnam Exposition Center Đông Anh commune	↔	Chèm (Hanoi University of Mining and Geology) Đông Ngạc ward	5:00 - 21:15 every day	18.95 km (11.77 miles)	Supplemental services, Branch routes	Began operation on Aug. 28th 2025
32TC2	Nhổn Bus Interchange (Hanoi University of Industry) Tây Tựu ward	↔	Vietnam Exposition Center Đông Anh commune	7:00 - 21:45 every day	30 km (19 miles)	Supplemental service, Branch route	Began operation on Aug. 28th 2025
90TC	Vietnam Exposition Center Đông Anh commune	↔	Nội Bài International Airport (Terminal T2) Nội Bài commune	7:00 - 19:00 every day	21.95 km (13.64 miles)	Supplemental service, Branch route	Began operation on Aug. 28th 2025
93TC	Vietnam Exposition Center Đông Anh commune	↔	Bắc Sơn (Sóc Sơn Commune)	7:00 - 19:00 every day	50.5 km (31.4 miles)	Supplemental service, Branch route	Began operation on Aug. 28th 2025
E02TC	Vinhomes Ocean Park Gia Lâm commune	Nguyễn Văn Linh ↔	Vietnam Exposition Center Đông Anh commune	7:00 - 22:10 every day	20.8 km (12.9 miles)	Electric bus, Supplemental service, Branch route	Began operation on Aug. 28th 2025
E08TC	Vinhomes Times City Vĩnh Tuy ward	↔	Vietnam Exposition Center Đông Anh commune	7:00 - 22:10 every day	14.9 km (9.3 miles)	Electric bus, Supplemental service, Branch route	Began operation on Aug. 28th 2025
E09TC	Vinhomes Smart City Tây Mỗ ward	↔	Vietnam Exposition Center Đông Anh commune	7:00 - 22:30 every day	29.2 km (18.1 miles)	Electric bus, Supplemental service, Branch route	Began operation on Aug. 28th 2025

===== Routes connecting VEC for the 1st Golden Autumn Fair (Oct. 26th to Nov. 4th) =====
Number	Termini			Operation time	Final avg. length	Type
02TC	Yên Nghĩa Bus Station Yên Nghĩa ward	↔	Vietnam Exposition Center Đông Anh commune	6:00 - 21:30 every day	33.4 km (20.8 miles)	Supplemental service, Branch route
32TC	Giáp Bát Bus Station Hoàng Mai ward	↔	Vietnam Exposition Center Đông Anh commune	7:00 - 22:00 every day	18.75 km (11.65 miles)	Supplemental service, Branch route
E08TC	Vinhomes Times City Vĩnh Tuy ward	↔	Vietnam Exposition Center Đông Anh commune	7:00 - 22:10 every day	14.9 km (9.3 miles)	Electric bus, Supplemental service, Branch route
E09TC	Vinhomes Smart City Tây Mỗ ward	↔	Vietnam Exposition Center Đông Anh commune	7:00 - 22:30 every day	29.2 km (18.1 miles)	Electric bus, Supplemental service, Branch route

===== Routes connecting VEC for the 1st Glorious Spring Fair (Feb. 2nd to 13th) =====
Number	Termini			Operation time	Final avg. length	Type	Note
02TC	Yên Nghĩa Bus Station Yên Nghĩa ward	↔	Vietnam Exposition Center Đông Anh commune	7:00 - 21:30 every day	33.4 km (20.8 miles)	Supplemental service, Branch route	These 3 routes were originally supposed to only operate for a week until the 8th, but TRAMOC eventually decided to extend the operations until the end of the Fair.
32TC	Giáp Bát Bus Station Hoàng Mai ward	↔	Vietnam Exposition Center Đông Anh commune	7:00 - 21:35 every day	18.75 km (11.65 miles)	Supplemental service, Branch route	These 3 routes were originally supposed to only operate for a week until the 8th, but TRAMOC eventually decided to extend the operations until the end of the Fair.
E08TC	Vinhomes Times City Vĩnh Tuy ward	↔	Vietnam Exposition Center Đông Anh commune	8:30 - 21:15 every day	14.9 km (9.3 miles)	Electric bus, Supplemental service, Branch route	These 3 routes were originally supposed to only operate for a week until the 8th, but TRAMOC eventually decided to extend the operations until the end of the Fair.
E09TC	Vinhomes Smart City Tây Mỗ ward	↔	Vietnam Exposition Center Đông Anh commune	7:00 - 21:30 every day	29.2 km (18.1 miles)	Electric bus, Supplemental service, Branch route	These 3 routes were originally supposed to only operate for a week until the 8th, but TRAMOC eventually decided to extend the operations until the end of the Fair.
122TC	Gia Lâm Bus Station Bồ Đề ward	VEC ↔	Bắc Thăng Long Industrial Zone Thiên Lộc commune	5:00 - 21:00 every day	31.9 km (19.8 miles)	Minibus, Supplemental service, Branch route	Probably began operation on Feb. 9th.

== Bus Operations Units in Hanoi ==
- Units of Hanoi Transportation Corporation (TRANSERCO)

- Hanoi Bus Enterprise: 01, 03A, 03B, 11(CT), 23, 31, 36, 40, 52, 52CT, 100, 108, 108TC

- 10-10 Bus Enterprise: 13, 16, 20A, 20ATC, 20B, 24, 28, 29, 53A, 53B, 67, 92, 97, 110, 111

- Hanoi Electric Vehicle JSC: 07, 25, 27, 34, 35A, 35B, 41, 55, 56A, 56B, 109

- Cầu Bươu Bus Enterprise: 06D, 06E, 16, 22A, 22B, 32, 84, 85, 103A, 103B, 117, 119

- Yên Viên Bus Enterprise: 15, 17, 54, 63, 90, 93, 95, 96, 112

- Newway Transportation JSC.: 47A, 47B, 48, 69, 94

- Tân Đạt Center: 06A, 06B, 06C, 12, 33, 62, 101A, 101B, 104, 113, 115

- Southern Hanoi Passenger Car Enterprise: 04, 05, 26, 30, 38, 39, 50, 87, 88, 98, 99, 106

- Hanoi Express Bus Enterprise: 02, 66, 68, 86, 89, 91, 102, 105, 107, 114, 116, BRT01

- Non-TRANSERCO units:

- Đông Anh Transport, Trading and Tourism JSC: 46, 123

- Hanoi Passenger Car JSC: 42, 49, 51, 71, 122, 124, 146, 202, 204, 205, 212, 212TC, 215, 215B

- Bảo Yến Tourism, Service and Construction Company Ltd.: 57, 58, 59, 60A, 60B, 61, 65, 74, 142, 143, 144, 157, 158, 159, 160, 161, 162, 163

- Hải Vân International Shipping Joint Venture Company: 64

- Hà Tây Passenger Car JSC: 70A, 70B, 118, 126, 213

- Hà Tây Automobile Transport JSC: 72

- Bảo Châu Transport and Service JSC: 78

- Liên Ninh Transportation and Service JSC: 08A, 08B, 09A, 09B, 19, 21A, 21B, 37, 125

- VinBus Ecology Transport Services LLC (Vingroup Corporation):

+ Ocean Park Depot: E01, E02, E03, E10, E11, OCP1, OCP2, OCT1, OCT2, NIA, 43

+ Smart City Depot: E04, E05, E06, E06TC, E07, E07TC, E08, E09, SMC1

- Hải Hưng Passenger Transport Automobile JSC: 202, 208

- Seoul Joint Venture JSC: 202

- Bắc Hà Passenger Transport JSC: 203

- Phượng Hoàng Transport Group JSC: 205

- Hà Nam Automobile Transport JSC: 206, 214

- Phù Cừ Passenger Transport Company Ltd.: 207

- Xuân Minh Hưng Yên Company Ltd.: 209

- Mến Hiếu Transport Company Ltd.: 210

- Sông Đà Transport Cooperative: 213

- Đại Duy Car Company Ltd.: 215, 215B

== Bus live-tracking ==
Travellers can use these following mobile apps: Tìm Buýt, GoMo by BusMap, VinBus to track bus routes in real time, and look up for bus routes information. These apps are available on the web, iOS, Android and Windows Phone.

The Windows Phone app for Tìm Buýt has been discontinued while the app on Android and iOS is available in both Vietnamese and English.

== Hanoibus' brand identity system ==
Buses are painted with peace bird symbol and Hanoi's Khue Van Cac seal on its body.

Livery	Role
Blue	Transerco-operated and subsidized main routes with bus capacity of 55 people or more.
Green	Transerco-operated and subsidized feeder routes with bus capacity of 30 people or less, only operate within downtown Hanoi and certain outskirt regions (Green-Dark Green). Inter-province routes (Full Green), Electric buses (VinBus)
Orange	Airport Express routes serving Noi Bai International Airport via Nhật Tân Bridge. Routes with blue stripe are subsidized.
Red and Yellow	Transerco-operated and subsidized routes using old livery (same as 'Blue' routes). Routes operated by private contractors and non-subsidized inter-province routes (route number above 200)
Green-Blue circles on White background	Routes using CNG-powered buses (capacity may vary between routes). BRT routes.
Black-Green or Gray-Green	Subsidized routes using electric buses (Bảo Yến, Transerco and VinBus).
