= Faculty of Chemical Technology =

Faculty of Chemical Technology is the name of a department at several universities:

- University of Chemical Technology and Metallurgy, Bulgaria
- University of Chemistry and Technology, Prague, Czech Republic
- University of Pardubice, Czech Republic
- Georgian Technical University, Tbilisi, Georgia
- Kaunas University of Technology, Lithuania
- Poznań University of Technology, Poland
- Hanoi University of Industry, Vietnam

== See also ==
- Faculty of Chemical Technology and Biotechnology, Budapest University of Technology and Economics, Hungary
- Faculty of Chemical Technologies and Environmental Engineering, National Polytechnic University of Armenia
