= USTH =

USTH may stand for:

- University of Santo Tomas Hospital, a hospital in Manila, Philippines
- University of Science and Technology of Hanoi, a university in Hanoi, Vietnam
