= Bát Tràng =

Bát Tràng Commune Xã Bát Tràng
- Commune (Class-II)
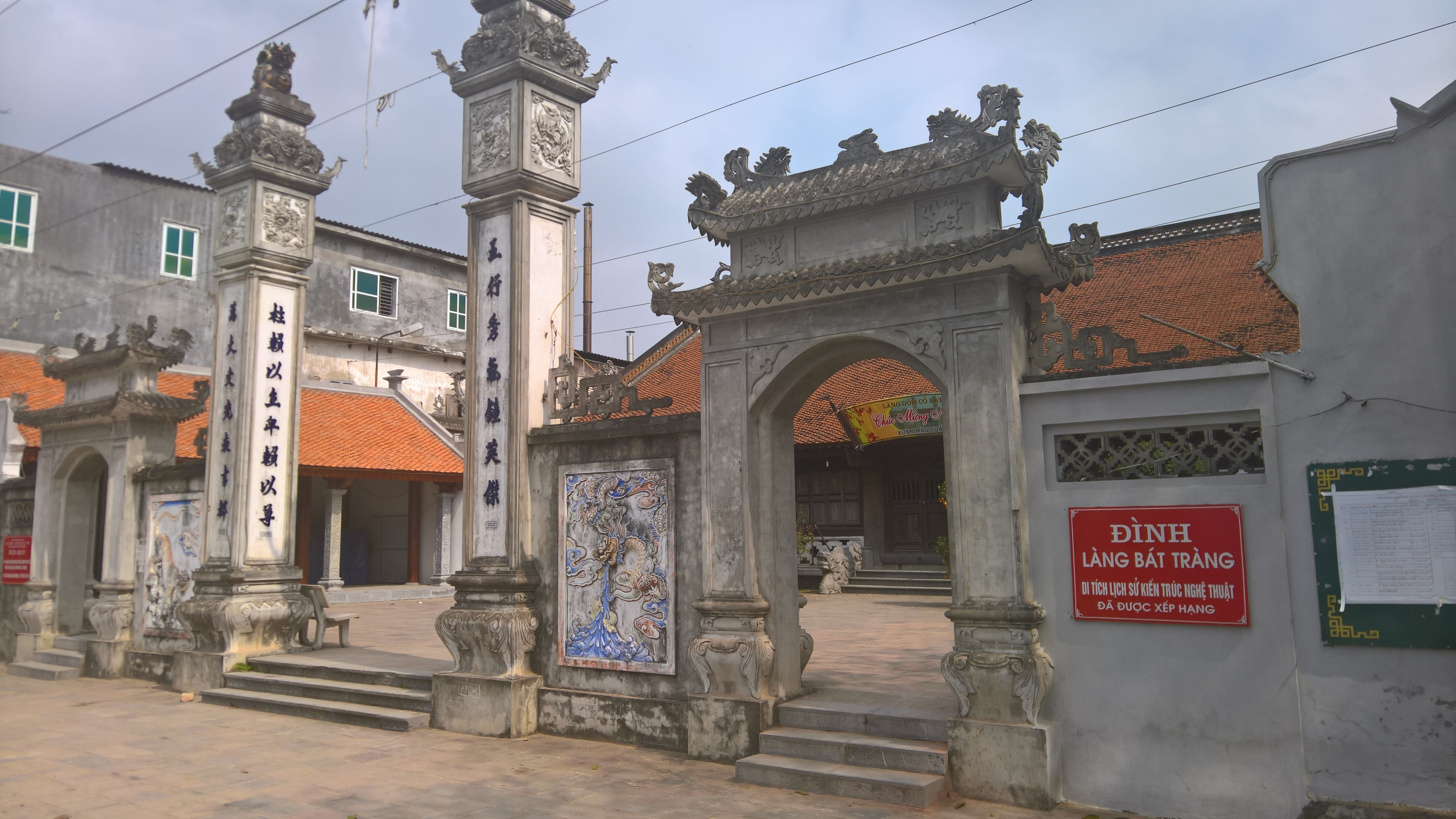
- Gate of Bát Tràng Communal Hall.
- Nickname: "Village of Pottery and Porcelain" (Làng Gốm Sứ)
- Interactive map of Bát Tràng Commune
- Location within Vietnam
- Country: Vietnam
- Region: Red River Delta
- Municipality: Hà Nội
- Central hall: Đào Xuyên Hamlet, Bát Tràng Commune

Government
  - Type: Commune-level authority
  - People Committee's Chairman: Hoàng Tiến Dũng
  - People Council's chairman: Nguyễn Văn Quyến
  - Front Committee's chairman: Chu Anh Tuấn
  - Party Committee's Secretary: Nguyễn Văn Quyến

Area
  - Total: 20.86 km^{2} (8.05 sq mi)

Population (July 1, 2025)
  - Total: 57,210
  - Density: 2,743/km^{2} (7,103/sq mi)
  - Ethnicities: Kinh
- Time zone: UTC+7 (Indochina Time)
- ZIP code: 10000–12423 (Note: An official code from December 31, 2023, to present.)
- Climate: Cwa
- Website: battrang.hanoi.gov.vn

Bát Tràng is a commune of Hanoi, the capital city in the Red River Delta of Vietnam.

== History ==
=== Middle Ages ===
According to Dư địa chí by royal official Nguyễn Trãi, Bát Tràng Village (Bát Tràng hương) may have appeared since the 14th century with the function of a career association, (Note: Phường nghề.) what was like commodity streets (Note: Phố hàng.) in Đông Đô the capital city. His document said : "Bát Tràng Village makes cups and bowls", "Bát Tràng of Gia Lâm District and Huê Cầu of Văn Giang District. These two villages provide goods for tribute to the Central State, including 70 sets of bowls and plates, accompanied by 20 dark cloth sheets".

The period from the middle of the 15th century to the early 18th century is often considered the golden time of Bát Tràng Village, which has existed as one of the leading brands of ceramics and porcelain in the world. Its items have followed big ships to go everywhere.

However, in the middle 18th century, the Qing Dynasty was forced to leave Western merchants into Chinese ports to freely buy and sell after receiving some political and military failures. This has led to the chain effect of the breakdown in the East Asian business, which was backward compared to Western goods. Modern archaeological achievements even pointed out that, Annamese aristocracy at that time was no longer popular with domestic goods. They have regularly ordered in large quantities of ceramics and porcelains from Guangxi. As a result, Bát Tràng brand has lost its influence very quickly and has to gradually narrowed the scale.

== Geography ==
=== Demography ===
According to the statistical yearbook of the whole Hanoi, as of 2025 Bát Tràng Commune had a demography of 48,987. Besides, the population of the whole ward is fully registered as Kinh people.

=== Climate ===
Climate data for Bát Tràng Commune
Month	Jan	Feb	Mar	Apr	May	Jun	Jul	Aug	Sep	Oct	Nov	Dec	Year
Record high °C (°F)	33.3 (91.9)	35.1 (95.2)	37.2 (99.0)	41.5 (106.7)	42.8 (109.0)	41.8 (107.2)	40.8 (105.4)	39.7 (103.5)	37.4 (99.3)	36.6 (97.9)	36.0 (96.8)	31.9 (89.4)	42.8 (109.0)
Mean daily maximum °C (°F)	19.8 (67.6)	20.6 (69.1)	23.2 (73.8)	27.7 (81.9)	31.9 (89.4)	33.4 (92.1)	33.4 (92.1)	32.6 (90.7)	31.5 (88.7)	29.2 (84.6)	25.7 (78.3)	22.0 (71.6)	27.6 (81.7)
Daily mean °C (°F)	16.6 (61.9)	17.7 (63.9)	20.3 (68.5)	24.2 (75.6)	27.6 (81.7)	29.3 (84.7)	29.4 (84.9)	28.7 (83.7)	27.7 (81.9)	25.3 (77.5)	21.9 (71.4)	18.3 (64.9)	23.9 (75.0)
Mean daily minimum °C (°F)	14.5 (58.1)	15.8 (60.4)	18.4 (65.1)	21.9 (71.4)	24.8 (76.6)	26.4 (79.5)	26.5 (79.7)	26.1 (79.0)	25.2 (77.4)	22.8 (73.0)	19.3 (66.7)	15.8 (60.4)	21.5 (70.7)
Record low °C (°F)	2.7 (36.9)	5.0 (41.0)	7.0 (44.6)	9.8 (49.6)	15.4 (59.7)	20.0 (68.0)	21.0 (69.8)	20.9 (69.6)	16.1 (61.0)	12.4 (54.3)	6.8 (44.2)	5.1 (41.2)	2.7 (36.9)
Average rainfall mm (inches)	22.5 (0.89)	24.6 (0.97)	47.0 (1.85)	91.8 (3.61)	185.4 (7.30)	253.3 (9.97)	280.1 (11.03)	309.4 (12.18)	228.3 (8.99)	140.7 (5.54)	66.7 (2.63)	20.2 (0.80)	1,670.1 (65.75)
Average rainy days	9.5	11.4	15.9	13.7	14.6	14.8	16.6	16.5	13.2	9.7	6.8	5.2	147.9
Average relative humidity (%)	79.9	82.5	84.5	84.7	81.1	80.0	80.7	82.7	81.0	78.5	77.1	76.2	80.7
Mean monthly sunshine hours	68.7	48.1	45.5	87.4	173.7	167.0	181.1	163.0	162.4	150.3	131.6	113.0	1,488.5
Source 1: Vietnam Institute for Building Science and Technology
Source 2: Extremes (Note: All-time record high; VietNamNet.vn (May record high and January record low only), VietNamNet.vn (June record high only), Imh.ac.vn (August record high only), Nchmf.gov.vn, January record high, November record high, April and May record low in The Yearbook of Indochina.)

== See also ==
- Đông Anh
- Gia Lâm
- Hoàng Mai
- Hồng Hà
- Hồng Vân
- Lĩnh Nam
- Long Biên
- Nam Phù
- Thanh Trì
