= PMAB =

PMAB may refer to:

- PMAB, the Presbyterian Mission Agency Board of the Presbyterian Church (USA)
- PMAB, the Department of Pharmacological, Medical and Agronomical Biotechnology at the University of Science and Technology of Hanoi
