= Vân Đình =

Vân Đình Commune Xã Vân Đình
- Commune (Class-II)
- Country: Vietnam
- Region: Red River Delta
- Municipality: Hà Nội
- Establishment: May 9, 2025 (ward)
- Central hall: Hoàng Xá Hamlet, Vân Đình Commune

Government
  - Type: Commune-level authority
  - People Committee's Chairman: Nguyễn Ngọc Điệp
  - People Council's Chairman: Bùi Thị Thu Hiền
  - Front Committee's Chairman: Nguyễn Hạnh Vân
  - Party Committee's Secretary: Bùi Thị Thu Hiền

Area
  - Total: 41.60 km^{2} (16.06 sq mi)

Population (July 1, 2025)
  - Total: 60,828
  - Density: 1,462/km^{2} (3,787/sq mi)
  - Ethnicities: Kinh; Tanka; Others
- Time zone: UTC+7 (Indochina Time)
- ZIP code: 10000–13506 (Note: An official code from December 31, 2023, to present.)
- Climate: Cwa
- Website: Vandinh.Hanoi.gov.vn; Vandinh.Hanoi.dcs.vn

Vân Đình [vən˧˧:ɗï̤ŋ˨˩] is a commune of Hanoi the capital city in the Red River Delta of Vietnam.

== See also ==
- Chương Mỹ
- Hòa Xá
- Hồng Sơn
- Phúc Sơn
- Phượng Dực
- Thanh Trì
- Ứng Hòa
- Ứng Thiên
- Vật Lại
