= Việt Hưng =

Việt Hưng Ward Phường Việt Hưng
- Ward (Class-II)
- Interactive map of Việt Hưng Ward
- Location within Vietnam
- Country: Vietnam
- Region: Red River Delta
- Municipality: Hà Nội
- Establishment: 1948 (commune); November 6, 2003 (ward)
- Central hall: No.1, Vạn Hạnh Street, Việt Hưng Ward

Government
  - Type: Ward-level authority
  - People Committee's Chairman: Vũ Xuân Trường
  - People Council's Chairman: Đường Hoài Nam
  - Front Committee's Chairman: Nguyễn Trường Giang
  - Party Committee's Secretary: Đường Hoài Nam

Area
  - Total: 12.91 km^{2} (4.98 sq mi)

Population (July 1, 2025)
  - Total: 83,188
  - Density: 6,444/km^{2} (16,690/sq mi)
  - Ethnicities: Kinh; Tanka; Others
- Time zone: UTC+7 (Indochina Time)
- ZIP code: 10000–11806 (Note: An official code from December 31, 2023, to present.)
- Climate: Cwa
- Website: Viethung.Hanoi.gov.vn; Viethung.Hanoi.dcs.vn

Việt Hưng [viə̰ʔt˨˩:hɨŋ˧˧] is a ward of Hanoi the capital in the Red River Delta of Vietnam.

== Geography ==
=== Demography ===
According to the statistical yearbook of Hanoi, as of 2025 Việt Hưng Ward had a demography of 83,188.

=== Climate ===
Climate data for Việt Hưng Ward
Month	Jan	Feb	Mar	Apr	May	Jun	Jul	Aug	Sep	Oct	Nov	Dec	Year
Record high °C (°F)	33.3 (91.9)	35.1 (95.2)	37.2 (99.0)	41.5 (106.7)	42.8 (109.0)	41.8 (107.2)	40.8 (105.4)	39.7 (103.5)	37.4 (99.3)	36.6 (97.9)	36.0 (96.8)	31.9 (89.4)	42.8 (109.0)
Mean daily maximum °C (°F)	19.8 (67.6)	20.6 (69.1)	23.2 (73.8)	27.7 (81.9)	31.9 (89.4)	33.4 (92.1)	33.4 (92.1)	32.6 (90.7)	31.5 (88.7)	29.2 (84.6)	25.7 (78.3)	22.0 (71.6)	27.6 (81.7)
Daily mean °C (°F)	16.6 (61.9)	17.7 (63.9)	20.3 (68.5)	24.2 (75.6)	27.6 (81.7)	29.3 (84.7)	29.4 (84.9)	28.7 (83.7)	27.7 (81.9)	25.3 (77.5)	21.9 (71.4)	18.3 (64.9)	23.9 (75.0)
Mean daily minimum °C (°F)	14.5 (58.1)	15.8 (60.4)	18.4 (65.1)	21.9 (71.4)	24.8 (76.6)	26.4 (79.5)	26.5 (79.7)	26.1 (79.0)	25.2 (77.4)	22.8 (73.0)	19.3 (66.7)	15.8 (60.4)	21.5 (70.7)
Record low °C (°F)	2.7 (36.9)	5.0 (41.0)	7.0 (44.6)	9.8 (49.6)	15.4 (59.7)	20.0 (68.0)	21.0 (69.8)	20.9 (69.6)	16.1 (61.0)	12.4 (54.3)	6.8 (44.2)	5.1 (41.2)	2.7 (36.9)
Average rainfall mm (inches)	22.5 (0.89)	24.6 (0.97)	47.0 (1.85)	91.8 (3.61)	185.4 (7.30)	253.3 (9.97)	280.1 (11.03)	309.4 (12.18)	228.3 (8.99)	140.7 (5.54)	66.7 (2.63)	20.2 (0.80)	1,670.1 (65.75)
Average rainy days	9.5	11.4	15.9	13.7	14.6	14.8	16.6	16.5	13.2	9.7	6.8	5.2	147.9
Average relative humidity (%)	79.9	82.5	84.5	84.7	81.1	80.0	80.7	82.7	81.0	78.5	77.1	76.2	80.7
Mean monthly sunshine hours	68.7	48.1	45.5	87.4	173.7	167.0	181.1	163.0	162.4	150.3	131.6	113.0	1,488.5
Source 1: Vietnam Institute for Building Science and Technology
Source 2: Extremes (Note: All-time record high; VietNamNet.vn (May record high and January record low only), VietNamNet.vn (June record high only), Imh.ac.vn (August record high only), Nchmf.gov.vn, January record high, November record high, April and May record low in The Yearbook of Indochina.)
