= University of Transport and Communications =

State university in Hanoi, Vietnam

The University of Transport and Communications (UTC; Vietnamese: Trường đại học Giao thông vận tải)) is a state university in Hanoi, Vietnam. It is the biggest and the oldest in transport field in Vietnam. The rector is Prof. Dr. Nguyễn Ngoc Long.

== History ==
The university was founded as the College of Public Works in 1918 under the French Administration in Vietnam. and it was re-opened by the Government of Democratic Republic of Vietnam on November 15, 1945, as the College of Public Work. From 1945 to 1960, the university trained a lot of scientific staff at the college level and intermediate level in the fields of transport, hydraulics, post office, architecture to serve the national salvation resistance and the country's development.

The university was formally named University of Transport and Communications under the Decision of the Vietnamese Government on March 24, 1962. At that time of establishment, its main campus was situated in Lang Thuong Ward, Dong Da District, Ha Noi City, Vietnam. However, it had to move out of Hanoi to many different places to avoid bombing from the war and came back in 1973 before the Vietnamese war ended in 1975. In 1968, it was called University of Highway-Railway Transport and one its branch which was established in Hai Phong city was named Maritime Transport Section and then it has been developed to become University of Maritime Transport. On April 27, 1990, its campus 2 in Ho Chi Minh City was established under the Decision of Ministry of Education and Training. November 15 is considered to be the Traditional day of the university, and March 24 is considered to be the foundation day of UTC.

The Japanese School of Hanoi first opened on the university campus in 1996.

== Rectors ==
1945–1947, H.E. Nguyen Nhu Quy, College of Public Transport Works

1947–1949, H.E. Dang Phuc Thong, College of Public Transport Works

1949–1954, H.E. Vu Duc Than, (College of Public Transport Works)

1954–1962, H.E. Nguyen Nhat Quang, (College of Public Transport Works)

1962–1968, H.E. Nguyen Kha, (the school was then called University of Transport and Communications)

1968–1979, H.E. Nguyen Nhat Quang (2nd time) (the school was then called the University of Highway-Railway Transport)

1979–1982, H.E. Le Quy An (the school was then called the University of Highway-Railway Transport)

1982–1990 Prof. Dr. Do Doan Hai

1990–1999, Dr. Nguyen Chi Bao

1999–2005, Prof. Dr. Le Van Hoc

2005– 2016, Prof. Dr. Tran Dac Su

2016 – up to now, Prof. Dr. Nguyen Ngoc Long

== Description ==
As of May 2010, the UTC has a total of 1053 staffs, of which 781 are lecturers including 51 professors and associate professors, 125 doctors and scientific doctors, 324 masters in charge of managing and training 31,000 students in undergraduates and post-graduates levels.

There are 5 specialized faculties and 3 institutes : Civil Engineering Faculty; Mechanical Engineering Faculty; Transport-Economics Faculty; Electrical Electronic Engineering Faculty; Information Technology Faculty; Institute of Construction Engineering; Institute of Science and Environment; Institute of Transport Planning and Management.

It has 68 disciplines for undergraduate degree, 16 disciplines for master's degree and 17 disciplines for doctor degree.
