= National Hospital of Tropical Diseases =

Hospital in Hanoi, Vietnam

National Hospital of Tropical Diseases Bệnh viện Bệnh nhiệt đới trung ương

Geography
- Location: 78, Giai Phong Street, Hanoi; Bau village, Kim Chung commune, Dong Anh district, Hanoi

History
- Former name: Institute of Clinical Medicine for Tropical Diseases (Viện Y học lâm sàng các bệnh Nhiệt đới)

Links
- Website: benhnhietdoi.vn

The National Hospital of Tropical Diseases is a hospital in Hanoi, Vietnam.

== History ==
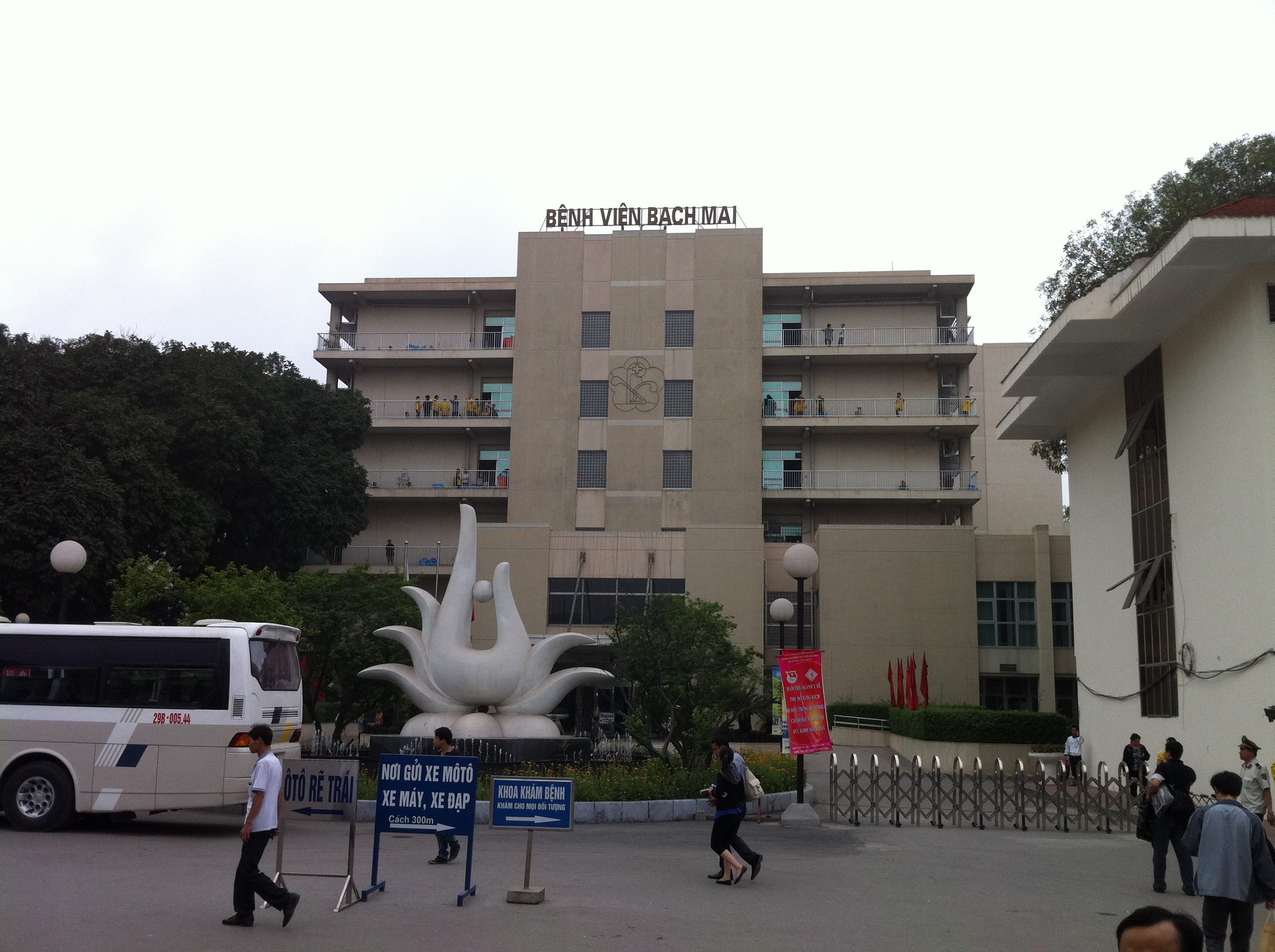
Bach Mai Hospital

Its founding can be traced back to the Cong Vong Hospital, a 1911 established facility for the treatment of infectious diseases. In 1929 this was expanded into the Robin Hospital. In March 1945 it was renamed to the Bach Mai Hospital. In 1989, the Institute of Clinical Medicine for Tropical Diseases was established, a merger between the Department of Infectious Diseases, Department of Microbiology, the Bach Mai Institute and the Department of Infectious Diseases of Hanoi Medical University.

The Department of Infectious Diseases of the Hanoi Medical University is located inside the hospital, as well as the Oxford University Clinical Research Unit.

On March 30, 2006, the Prime Minister decided to establish the National Institute of Infectious and Tropical Diseases directly affiliated by the Ministry of Health on the basis of National Institute for clinical research in Tropical medicine. In November 2009, the Ministry of Health renamed National Institute of Infectious and Tropical Diseases to the National Hospital for Tropical Diseases. Since then this name has been attached and became a famous brand name for one of the leading hospitals in infectious diseases management area in healthcare.

With positive contributions and operational efforts, the National Hospital for Tropical Diseases has twice been awarded the Hero of Labor in the reform period, and was awarded the Second and Third Class Labor Medals respectively, for having Outstanding achievements in examination and treatment of patients with acute respiratory infections caused by SARS-CoV-2 virus and prevention of COVID-19 epidemic.

During the COVID-19 pandemic in Vietnam, all COVID-19 patients from Northern Vietnam were treated at the hospital.
