= Thường Tín =

Thường Tín Commune Xã Thường Tín Thị trấn Thường Tín
- Commune (Class-V)
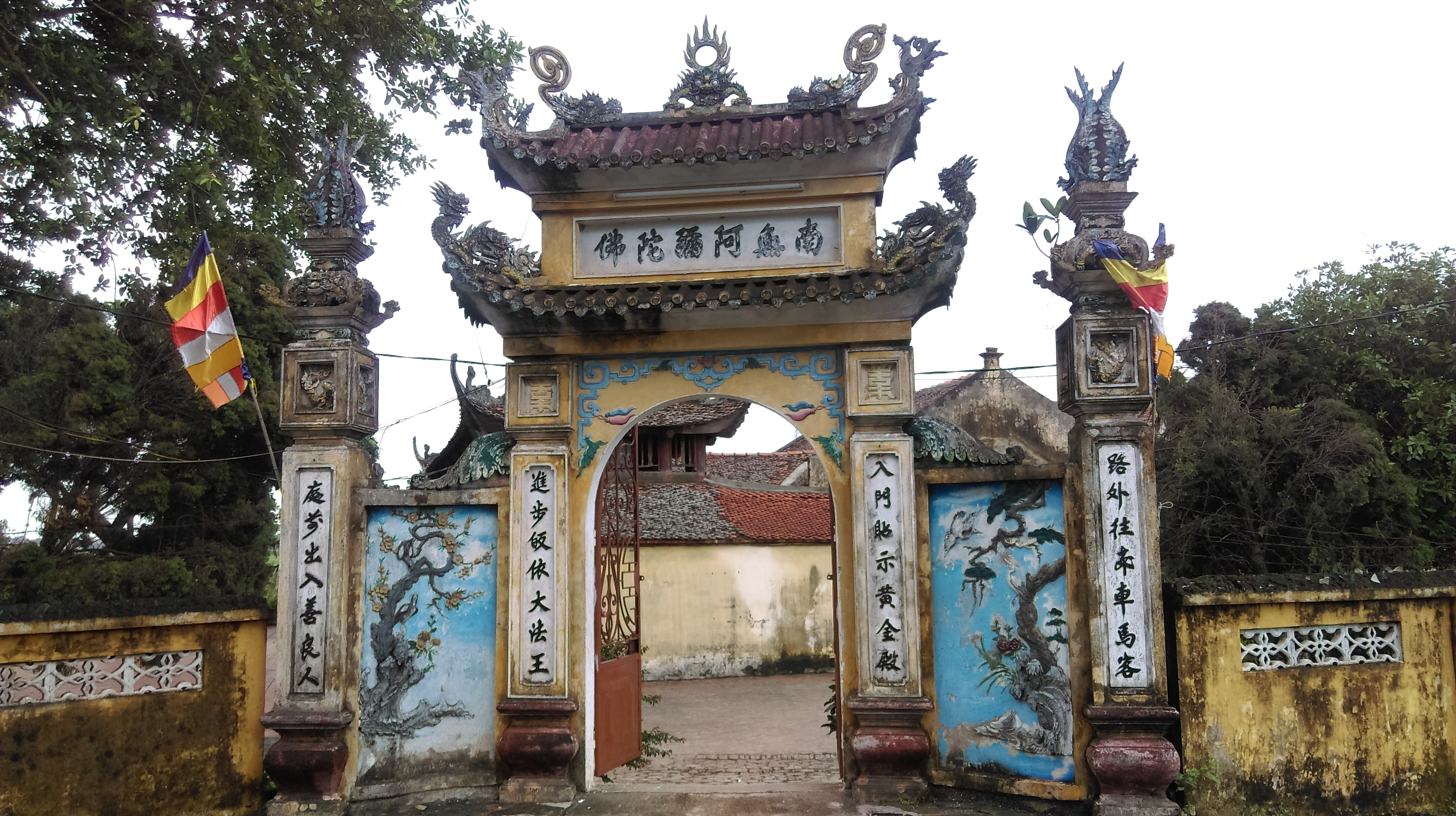
- Grand Gate of Pháp Vân Temple.

- Location within Vietnam
- Coordinates: 20°52′14″N 105°51′50″E
- Country: Vietnam
- Region: Red River Delta
- Municipality: Hanoi
- Central hall: No.1, Thượng Phúc Street, Thường Tín Commune

Government
  - Type: Commune-level authority

Area
  - Total: 28.29 km^{2} (10.92 sq mi)

Population (July 1, 2025)
  - Total: 70,739
  - Density: 2,501/km^{2} (6,480/sq mi)
- Time zone: UTC+7 (UTC+7)
- ZIP code: 10000–13606 (Note: An official code from December 31, 2023, to present.)
- Climate: Cwa
- Website: Thuongtin.Hanoi.gov.vn; Thuongtin.Hanoi.dcs.vn

Thường Tín [tʰɨə̤ŋ˨˩:tin˧˥] is a commune of Hanoi the capital city in the Red River Delta of Vietnam.

== See also ==
- Chương Dương
- Hồng Vân
- Thượng Phúc
