= Sóc Sơn =

- Commune
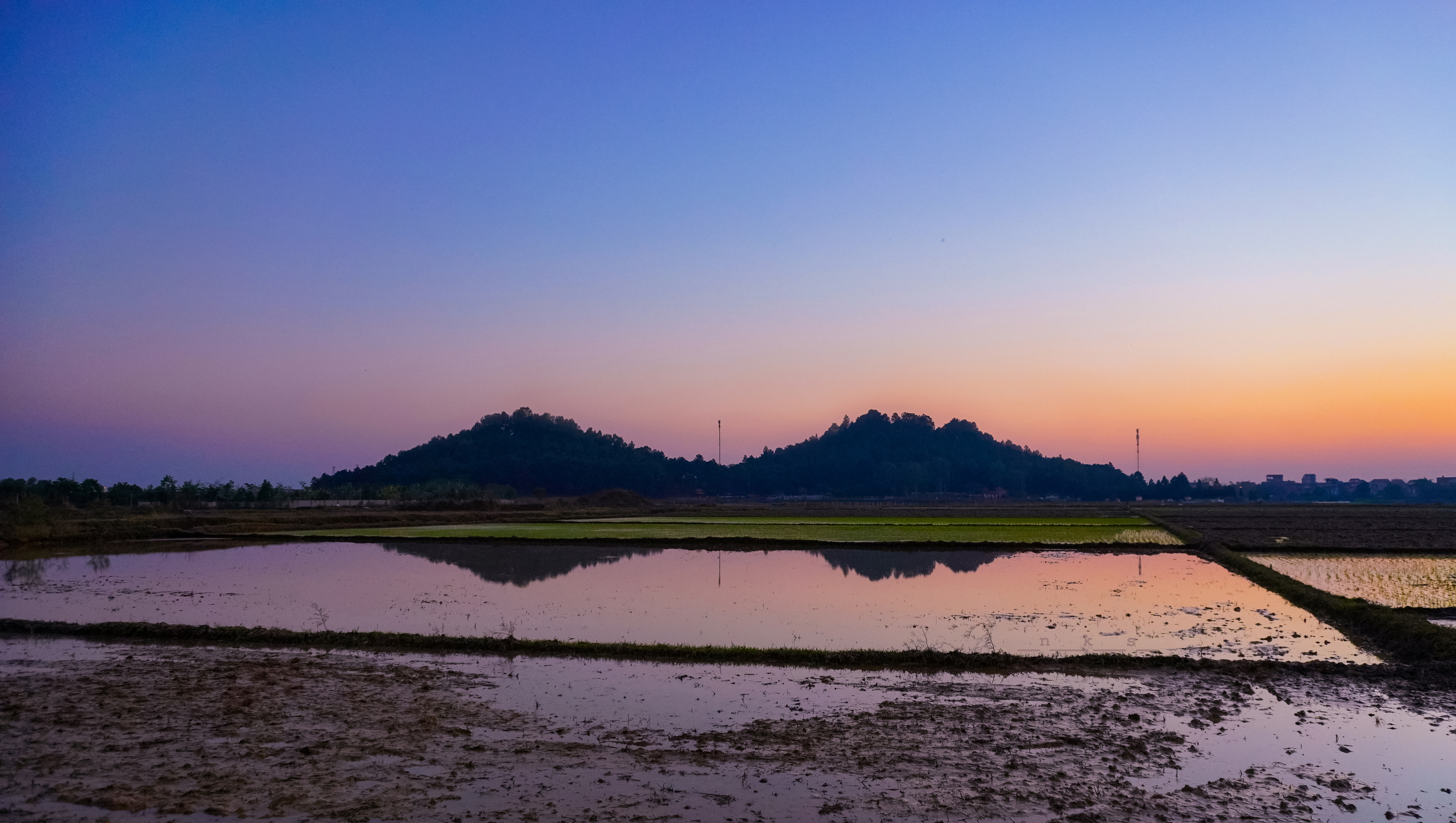
- Núi Đôi
- Interactive map of Sóc Sơn
- Coordinates: 21.257658414448223°N 105.84883796107425°E
- Country: Vietnam
- Region: Red River Delta
- Municipality: Hanoi
- Administrative headquarters: No. 1 Núi Đôi Street

Area
  - Total: 68.24 km^{2} (26.35 sq mi)

Population (2025)
  - Total: 117,876
  - Density: 1,727/km^{2} (4,470/sq mi)
- Website: socson.hanoi.gov.vn

Sóc Sơn is a commune in the municipality of Hanoi, Vietnam.

On 16 June 2025, district-level administrative units nationwide ceased to operate.

On the same date, the Standing Committee of the National Assembly of Vietnam issued Resolution No. 1656/NQ-UBTVQH15 on the arrangement of commune-level administrative units in Hanoi in 2025. Under the resolution, the entire area and population of Sóc Sơn township, Tân Minh Commune, and Đông Xuân Commune, together with Phù Lỗ, Phù Linh, and Tiên Dược communes, the entire population and part of the area of Mai Đình Commune, and parts of Phú Minh and Quang Tiến communes, all formerly part of Sóc Sơn district, were merged to form a new commune named Sóc Sơn.
