= Nghĩa Trụ =

Commune in Hưng Yên province, Vietnam

- Commune
- Vincom Mega Mall Ocean City and AEON Mall Văn Giang
- Interactive map of Nghĩa Trụ
- Coordinates: 20.94612°N 105.97811°E
- Country: Vietnam
- Region: Red River Delta
- Province: Hưng Yên
- Established: 16 June 2025

Area
  - Total: 22.80 km^{2} (8.80 sq mi)

Population (2025)
  - Total: 46,561
  - Density: 2,042/km^{2} (5,289/sq mi)

Nghĩa Trụ is a commune in Hưng Yên province, Vietnam.

== Geography ==
Nghĩa Trụ commune is located in the northern part of Hưng Yên province. It borders the following communes:

- To the northeast: Như Quỳnh
- To the southwest: Văn Giang
- To the south: Hoàn Long and Nguyễn Văn Linh
- To the north: Phụng Công

== History ==
On 16 June 2025:

- The National Assembly adopted Resolution No. 203/2025/QH15 amending and supplementing several articles of the Constitution of the Socialist Republic of Vietnam (effective June 16, 2025). Under the resolution, district-level administrative units nationwide ceased operations on July 1, 2025.
- The National Assembly Standing Committee adopted Resolution No. 1666/NQ-UBTVQH15 on the reorganization of commune-level administrative units in Hưng Yên province in 2025 (effective June 16, 2025). Under the resolution, the entire area and population of the communes of Long Hưng, Vĩnh Khúc, and Nghĩa Trụ were merged to form a new commune named Nghĩa Trụ.

== Notable people ==
- Nguyễn Công Hoan (1903–1977)
- Tô Chấn (1904–1936)
- Tô Quyền (1929–1996)
- Nguyễn Tài (1926–2016)
- Tô Ngọc Vân (1906–1954)
- Tô Ngọc Thanh (1934–2024)
- Lê Giản (1911–2003)
- Tô Hiệu (1912–1944)
- Tô Quang Đẩu (1906–1990)
- Lê Văn Lương (1912–1995)
- Tô Lâm (1957)
- Quản Minh Cường (1969)
- Nguyễn Thanh Tùng (1968)
- Tô Anh Dũng (1978)
- Nguyễn Văn Thông (1956)
