= Hanoi University of Mining and Geology =

- Trường Đại học Mỏ - Địa chất Hà Nội
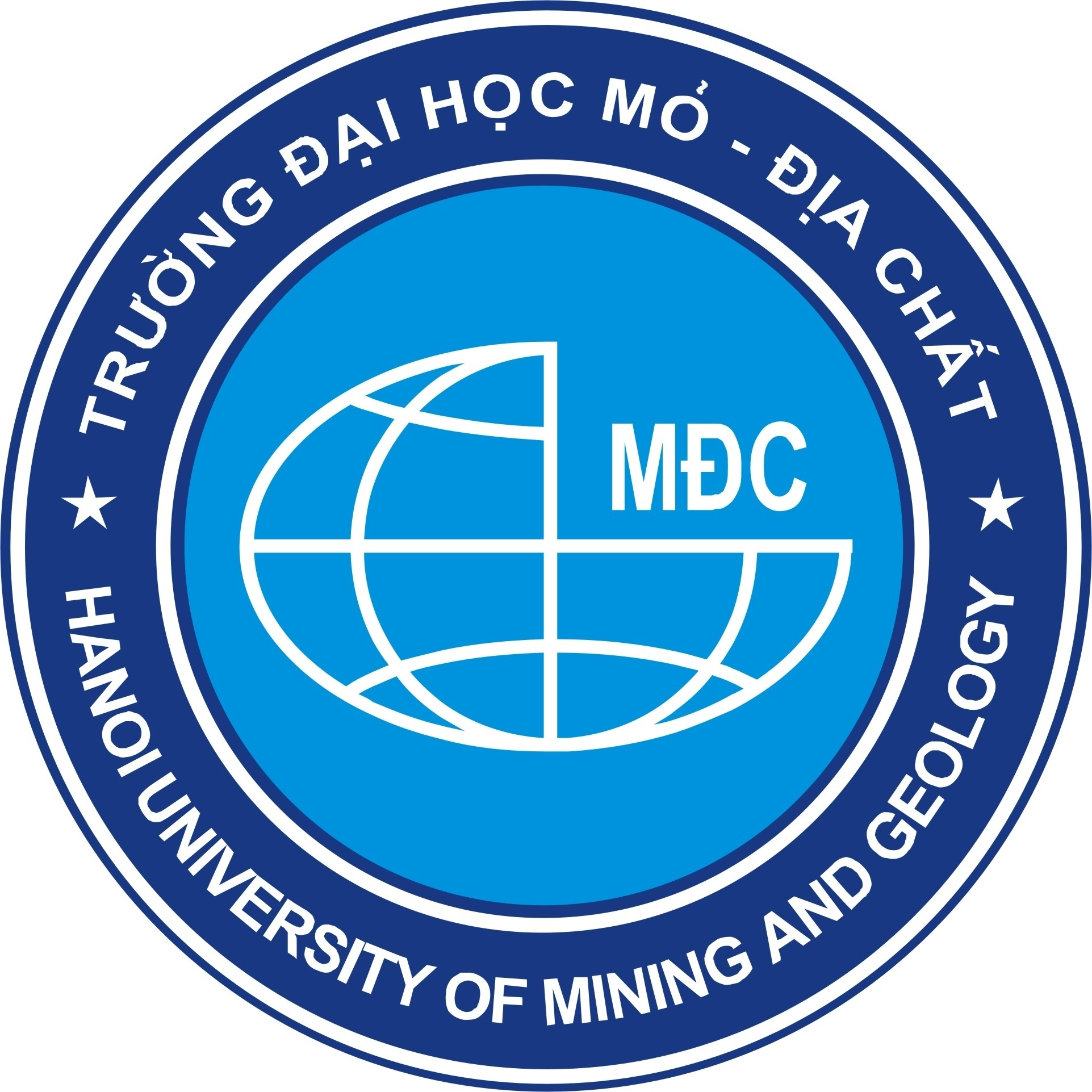
- Type: Public
- Established: August 1966; 60 years ago
- Location: Bắc Từ Liêm, Hanoi, Vietnam; 21.0734°N 105.7738°E
- Campus: Urban/Suburban
- Website: ctsv.humg.edu.vn/en/

Hanoi University of Mining and Geology is a university in Hanoi, the capital of Vietnam. It trains future technical experts in the exploration and exploitation of natural resources, and in the protection of mining and geological environments. The university also serves as a center for research and technology transfer in geology, petroleum, surveying, and mining. Additional programs are offered in theoretical sciences, information technology, and business administration.

The university has three campuses: Hanoi (main campus), Quảng Ninh, and Vũng Tàu.

== Faculties ==
- Faculty of Mining
- Faculty of Geology
- Faculty of Information technology
- Faculty of Surveying and Mapping
  - Department of Cartography
  - Department of Photogrammetry and Remote Sensing
  - Department of Surveying Engineering
  - Department of Geodesy
  - Department of General surveying
  - Department of Mining surveying
- Faculty of Oil and Gas
- Faculty of Economics and Business Administration
- Faculty of Construction
- Faculty of Environment
- Faculty of Electromechanics

== Alumni ==
- Trần Đức Lương: president of Vietnam from 1997 to 2006
- Cao Lai Quang: Permanent Deputy Minister of Construction (K20 Alumni of Underground Construction).
- Doan The Cuong: Deputy Secretary of the Provincial Party Committee, Chairman of People's Committee of Hung Yen province (K20 Alumni of Civil Geology)
- Dang Hung Vo (Professor; Doctor of Science): former Deputy Minister of Natural Resources and Environment; studied and taught at the school from 1969–1976.
- Do Van Hau: Former Chairman Vietnam National Oil and Gas Group.
- Ho Sy Hau (Major General): Former Director of the Economic Department, Ministry of National Defense, a student of Geodesy in 1968.
- Le Hai An (Associate Professor, PhD): Former Secretary of the Party Committee, Deputy Minister of Education and Training (since 2018), Party Secretary, Principal University of Mining and Geology (from 2014 to 2018)
- Le Minh Chuan: Chairman Vietnam Coal and Mineral Industry Group.
- Nguyen Duc Binh (Sparrow in the Sun): known as the "prodigy of the Vietnamese empire" is a gamer, later studying at the Department of Information Technology at the University of Mining and Geology, course K59 since 2014.
- Nguyen Hai, Colonel, People's Artist, former Deputy Head of the People's Public Security Drama Troupe, 20th class student, majoring in underground mining.
- Nguyen Linh Ngoc: Deputy Minister of Natural Resources and Environment (K20 Alumni of Search and Exploration)
- Nguyen Ngoc Thuy: Chairman of the Board of Directors – General Director of the Company company Egroup and Chairman of the Board of Directors of Apax English Joint Stock Company.
- Pham Nhat Vuong: Passed the entrance exam to the University of Mining and Geology in 1986, and was the first billionaire US dollar on the Vietnamese stock exchange since March 7, 2011 with assets worth up to about 21,200 billion Vietnamese Dong, equivalent to 1 billion US dollars at that time.
- Pham The Dung: Chairman of Gia Lai Provincial People's Committee (K21 Alumni of Geodesy)
- Pham The Duyet: former Standing member of the Politburo, former Secretary of the Hanoi Party Committee, former Head of the Party Central Committee's Mass Mobilization Committee, Chairman of Vietnam Fatherland Front.
- Pham Viet Khoa: Chairman of the Board of Directors of FECON Group.
- Tran Duc Luong: former member of the Standing Committee of Politburo, President Socialist Republic of Vietnam Male (Alumni specializing in Geology K11)
- Tran Thanh Hai: Ta Quang Buu Award in 2015, Principal of the University of Mining and Geology since 2018
- Tran Van Thang (Major General): Director of the Map Department, General Staff.
- Truong Quy Hai: Musician, former member of the Standing Committee - Head of the Hanoi Youth Union School Committee.
- Vo Hong Phuc: Minister of Ministry of Planning and Investment (K11 Alumni of Economics).
- Pham Ngoc Cuong is a former student at the University of Mining and Geology, is a Digital marketer, and also a digital currency investor in Vietnam.
