= Xuân Mai =

- Commune
- A street in Xuân Mai Commune
- Interactive map of Xuân Mai
- Coordinates: 20.90149684547443°N 105.59751752204292°E
- Country: Vietnam
- Region: Red River Delta
- Municipality: Hanoi
- Administrative headquarters: Trí Thủy Hamlet

Area
  - Total: 50.72 km^{2} (19.58 sq mi)

Population (2025)
  - Total: 67,310
  - Density: 1,326/km^{2} (3,430/sq mi)
- Website: xuanmai.hanoi.gov.vn

Xuân Mai is a commune in the municipality of Hanoi, Vietnam.

On 16 June 2025, district-level administrative units nationwide ceased to operate.

On the same date, the Standing Committee of the National Assembly of Vietnam issued Resolution No. 1656/NQ-UBTVQH15 on the arrangement of commune-level administrative units in Hanoi in 2025. Under the resolution, the entire area and population of Xuân Mai Township, Nam Phương Tiến and Thủy Xuân Tiên communes, and part of the area and population of Tân Tiến Commune, formerly part of Chương Mỹ district, were merged to form a new commune named Xuân Mai.
