= University of Science and Technology of Hanoi =

Public university in Hanoi, Vietnam

- Other names: USTH, Vietnam France University
- Established: 2009
- Location: A21 Building, Vietnam Academy of Science and Technology, 18 Hoàng Quốc Việt, Cầu Giấy, Hà Nội; 21°02′53″N 105°48′05″E
- Website: www.usth.edu.vn
- Location within Vietnam

The University of Science and Technology of Hanoi (USTH), also called Vietnam-France University, is a public university in Hanoi, Vietnam. USTH was founded in 2009 under the Intergovernmental Agreement between Vietnam and France and was signed on 12 November 2009. The official language used in teaching at USTH is English.

USTH is built with funds from the government of Vietnam, the French government, the Vietnam Academy of Science and Technology (VAST), the Asian Development Bank, and the USTH Consortium of 42 universities and research organizations of France. USTH is one of the four public universities under Ministry of Education and Training.

== History ==
In June 2008, Deputy Prime Ministry Cum Minister for Education and Training, Nguyen Thien Nhan, and the Ministry for French Higher Education and Research, Valérie Pécresse, decided to choose France as the foreign strategic partner of USTH. This project was funded by the Asian Development Bank.

According to Decision No. 2067 of the Prime Minister of Vietnam on 9 December 2009, USTH was established and built within the campus of Hoa Lac Hi-tech Park. On 10 November 2011, there was a signing ceremony between the Asian Development Bank and the State Bank of Vietnam to accept the $190 million to build the new USTH's campus in Hoa Lac, Hanoi.

In the academic field, the first bachelor and master programs in Advanced Materials Science and Nanotechnology (AMSN) and Pharmacological and Agronomical Biotechnology (PAB) began in October 2010. The first master program in Space and Applications (SA) and first Ph.D. program started in October 2012 and August 2014, respectively. USTH established the PLMCC (Product Lifecycle Competency Centre) in June 2014. Four months later, three joint international research units were established. Currently, there are six international joint laboratories at USTH.

In October 2018, the Prime Minister issued Decision No. 1434/QD-TTg approving adjustments to the policy of the USTH project of establishing at Hoa Lac Hi-Tech Park. According to the decision, the new campus of USTH within the area will have classrooms and laboratories at international standards. On 18 March 2016, USTH was transferred to the VAST, following the decision made by the Prime Minister.

== Training programs ==
USTH offers training programs at three levels: Bachelor, Master and Ph.D. In master programs, USTH cooperates with French universities in the USTH Consortium to co-accredit the international diplomas. The graduates will receive the dual diplomas from USTH and French universities.

=== Bachelor programs ===
The Bachelor program will be taught in three years, based on the European Credit Transfer and Accumulation System (ECTS) as in most of the European countries. USTH offers 16 training fields based on the needs of Vietnam's science and technology development.

In 2022, USTH reached a consensus with French universities within the USTH Consortium to launch 3 double-degree programs: Biotechnology – Drug discovery, Information and Communication Technology, and Chemistry.

== Lectures ==
Starting in 2009, with the guidance and support of the Ministry of Education and Training and the French Embassy in Vietnam, the university sent its first Ph.D. students to study under the USTH Consortium, under the 322 program and the 911 projects.

== Research activities ==
USTH had built six international joint labs with over 40 institutes and universities. In addition, the university's research projects have received funding from the USTH Consortium, European Climate Foundation, and Wellcome Trust Fund.
