= Long Biên, Hanoi =

Long Biên
- Ward
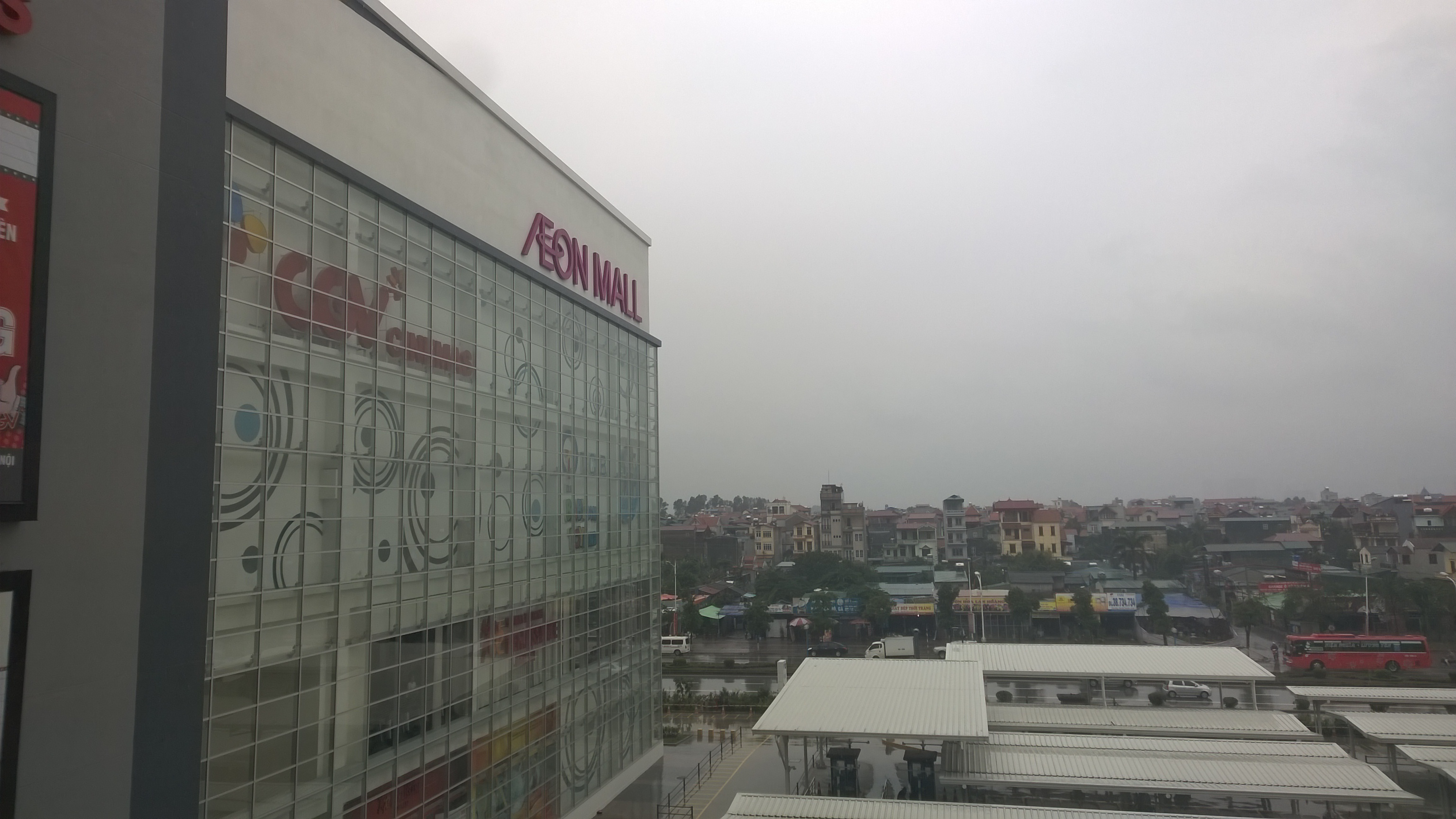
- AEON Mall in Long Biên Ward
- Interactive map of Long Biên
- Coordinates: 21.023899715913178°N 105.88918275466641°E
- Country: Vietnam
- Region: Red River Delta
- Municipality: Hanoi
- Administrative headquarters: No. 199 Bát Khối Street

Area
  - Total: 19.04 km^{2} (7.35 sq mi)

Population (2024)
  - Total: 62,887
  - Density: 3,302/km^{2} (8,550/sq mi)
- Website: longbien.hanoi.gov.vn

Long Biên is a ward in the municipality of Hanoi, Vietnam. The ward inherited its name from the former Long Biên district.

On 16 June 2025, district-level administrative units nationwide ceased to operate.

On the same date, the Standing Committee of the National Assembly of Vietnam issued Resolution No. 1656/NQ-UBTVQH15 on the arrangement of commune-level administrative units in Hanoi in 2025. Under the resolution, parts of the area and population of Cự Khối, Phúc Đồng, and Thạch Bàn wards, formerly part of Long Biên district, Bát Tràng Commune, formerly part of Gia Lâm district, the entire population and part of the area of Long Biên Ward, and parts of Bồ Đề and Gia Thụy wards, formerly part of Long Biên district, were merged to form a new ward named Long Biên.
