= Ứng Hòa =

- Commune
- Nickname: Khu Cháy Anh hùng
- Interactive map of Ứng Hòa
- Coordinates: 20.68523843025681°N 105.81019148460307°E
- Country: Vietnam
- Region: Red River Delta
- Municipality: Hanoi
- Established: 16 June 2025
- Administrative headquarters: Hòa Lâm Hamlet

Area
  - Total: 67.81 km^{2} (26.18 sq mi)

Population (2025)
  - Total: 63,750
  - Density: 940/km^{2} (2,400/sq mi)
- Website: unghoa.hanoi.gov.vn

Ứng Hòa is a commune in the municipality of Hanoi, Vietnam.

On 16 June 2025, district-level administrative units nationwide ceased to operate.

On the same date, the Standing Committee of the National Assembly of Vietnam issued Resolution No. 1656/NQ-UBTVQH15 on the arrangement of commune-level administrative units in Hanoi in 2025. Under the resolution, the entire area and population of Đại Cường, Đại Hùng, Đông Lỗ, Đồng Tân, Kim Đường, Minh Đức, Trầm Lộng, and Trung Tú communes, formerly part of Ứng Hòa district, were merged to form a new commune named Ứng Hòa.
