= Hòa Lạc, An Giang =

Coordinates: 10°40′10″N 105°13′00″E

Hòa Lạc
- Rural commune and village
- Interactive map of Hòa Lạc
- Country: Vietnam
- Province: An Giang
- Time zone: UTC+07:00 (Indochina Time)
- Climate: Aw
- Website: http://hoalac.angiang.gov.vn/

Hòa Lạc is a rural commune (xã) and village of An Giang Province, Vietnam.
