= Đông Anh =

Đông Anh Commune Xã Đông Anh
- Commune (Class-II)
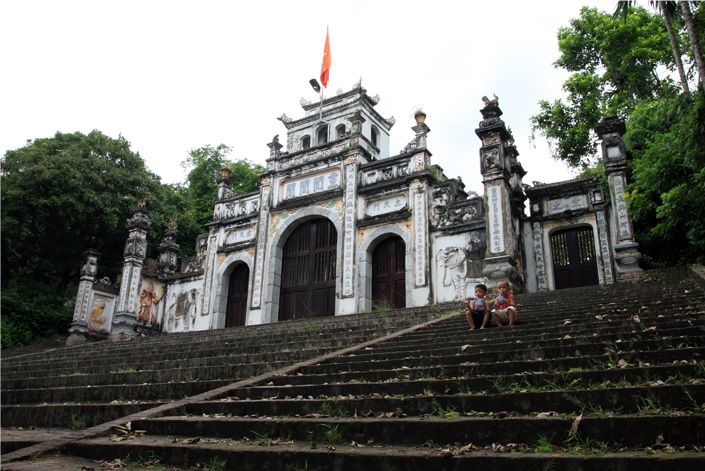

- Location within Vietnam
- Coordinates: 21°09′18″N 105°50′55″E
- Country: Vietnam
- Region: Red River Delta
- Municipality: Hanoi
- Time zone: UTC+7 (UTC + 7)

Đông Anh is a commune of Hanoi, the capital of Vietnam.
