= Hanoi University of Industry =

Coordinates: 21.0541°N 105.7349°E

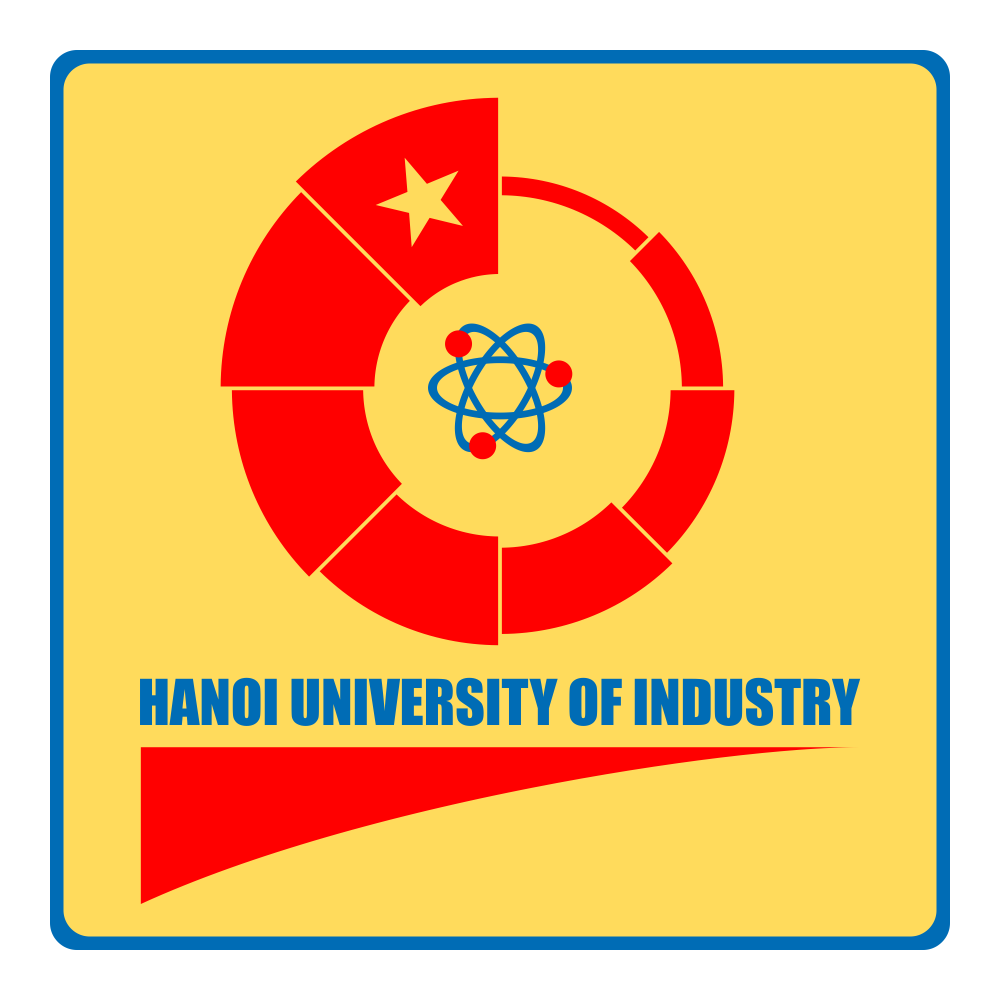
Hanoi University of Industry
- Motto: Creativity - Quality - Development - Effectiveness
- Type: Technical university (Public)
- Established: 1898
- President: Trần Đức Quý
- Academic staff: 1,700
- Students: 60,000
- Location: Bắc Từ Liêm district, Hanoi, Vietnam
- Campus: 50 ha Urban
- Colors: Red & yellow
- Website: www.haui.edu.vn

Hanoi University of Industry (Vietnamese: Đại học Công nghiệp Hà Nội), also known by the abbreviation HaUI, is a public technical university in Hanoi, Vietnam. Founded 1898, the university was one of the first technical schools to be established in the country and has since become a comprehensive research university.

== History ==
Hanoi Vocational School was established on 10 August 1898, in accordance with the decision of Hanoi Chamber of Commerce. It was renamed Hanoi Practical Technology School in 1931. Hai Phong Vocational School was established on 29 August 1913, in accordance with the degree by the Governor – General of Indochina. In 1921, it was renamed Hai Phong Practical Technology School.

The first course of the Technical High School No. 1 began on 15 February 1955, at the place of the former Hanoi Practical Technology School (2F Quang Trung). In 1956, the first course of Technical Worker Training School No.1 began at the place of the former Hai Phong Practical Technology School (May To street, Hai Phong). During the war, the school moved to Bac Giang province.

In 1962, Technical High School No.1 recruited college level students. It was renamed as Electrical Engineering Senior School. It was renamed Mechanical High School No.1 in 1966. In 1993 it was renamed to the former name of as Hanoi Practical Technology School. During the war, the school moved to Vinh Phuc province.

In 1986, Technical Worker Training School No.1 moved to Minh Khai commune of Tu Liem district, Hanoi. In 1991, Hanoi Practical Technology School moved to Tay Tuu village, Tu Liem district, Hanoi. On 22 April 1997, the Ministry of Industry issued the decision 580/QD-TCCB to merge the two schools: Technical Worker Training School No.1 and Hanoi Practical Technology School. The new school was named Industrial High School No.1. On 28 May 1999, Industrial High School No.1 was upgraded to Hanoi Industrial College by the Decision 126/QD-TTG by the Prime Minister.

On 2 December 2005, the Prime Minister signed the Decision 315/2005 QD-TTG to established Hanoi University of Industry on the basis of Hanoi Industrial College.

== Academics ==
=== Departments ===
- Faculty of Mechanical Engineering
- Faculty of Automobile Technology
- Faculty of Electrical Engineering Technology
- Faculty of Electronics Engineering Technology
- Faculty of Information Technology
- Faculty of Auditing and Accounting
- Faculty of Business Management
- Faculty of Chemical Technology
- Faculty of Garment Technology and Fashion Design
- Faculty of Foreign languages
- Faculty of Technical Teacher's Training and Tourism
- Faculty of International Cooperation and Training
- Faculty of Physical-National Defense Education
- Faculty of Fundamental Science
- Faculty of Tourism - Padogogy
- Faculty of In-service Training

=== Training center ===
- Graduate Education Center
- Center for Research & Development and Technology Transfer
- Center for Driver Training
- HaUI Honhai Centre for Technical Training
- Center for Informatics and Foreign Language
- Vietnam-Korea Mechanical Engineering Center
- Vietnam-Japan Centre
- In-Service Center

=== Services center ===
- Center for Enterprise Partnership and Vocational Skill Assessment
- Library center
- Quality Management center
- Domitory - Canteen - Services Center
- Health Care Service Center
