= Nguyễn Thu Thủy =

Nguyễn Thu Thủy could refer to:

- Nguyễn Thu Thủy (artist) (born 1971), Vietnamese artist
- Nguyễn Thu Thủy (Miss Vietnam) (1976–2021), Vietnamese beauty pageant
