= Vietnamese dragon =

Creatures in Vietnamese folklore and mythology

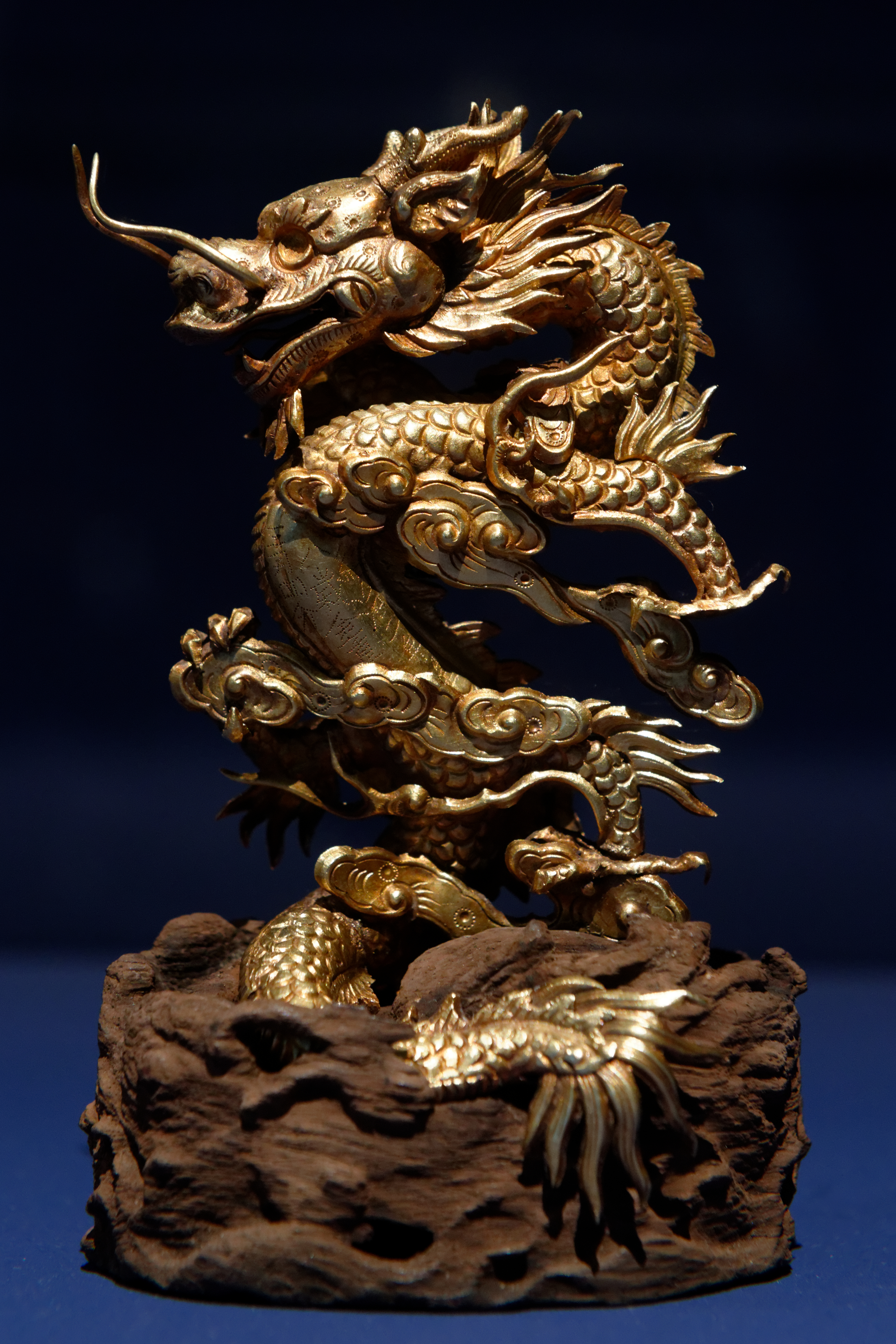
Dragon emerging from the clouds, Nguyễn dynasty (1842)

Vietnamese dragons (Vietnamese: Rồng; chữ Nôm: 蠬/蠪; Sino-Vietnamese: Long; chữ Hán: 龍) are symbolic creatures in Vietnamese folklore and mythology. According to an ancient origin myth, the Vietnamese people are descended from a dragon and an Immortal. The dragon was symbolic of bringing rain, essential for agriculture. It represents the emperor, the prosperity and power of the nation. Similar to the Chinese dragon (which has also influenced and appeared in Japan and Korea as fierce but benevolent serpentine dragons alike), the Vietnamese dragon is the symbol of yang, representing the universe, life, existence, and growth.

== The creation legend ==
Lạc Long Quân, king of the dragonkind living near the Đông sea, married a fairy goddess, Âu Cơ who was the daughter of the birdkind emperor Đế Lai, descendant of Thần Nông. Âu Cơ bore 100 eggs, which hatched into 100 sons. The first-born son became the king of Lạc Việt, the first dynasty of Vietnam, and proclaimed himself Emperor Hùng Vương. The First was followed by Hùng Vương The Second, Hùng Vương The Third and so on, through 18 reigns. This is the origin of the Vietnamese proverb: "Con Rồng, cháu Tiên" (Descendants of Dragon and Immortal, lit. "Children of Dragon, Grandchildren of Immortal").

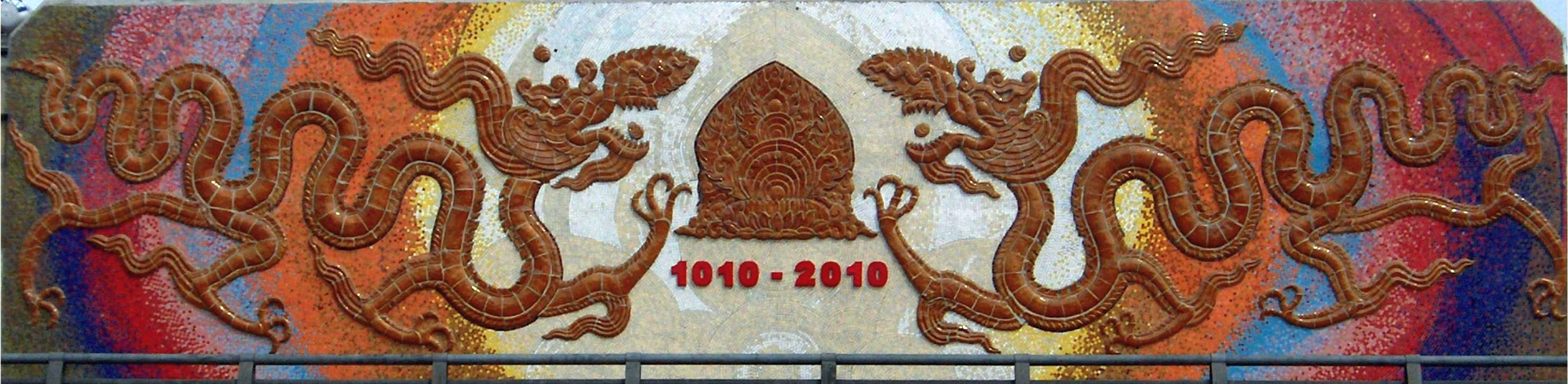
Modern depictions of Ly dynasty-style dragon, ceramic art at Chuong Duong bridge

== Historical development of Vietnamese dragon's image ==
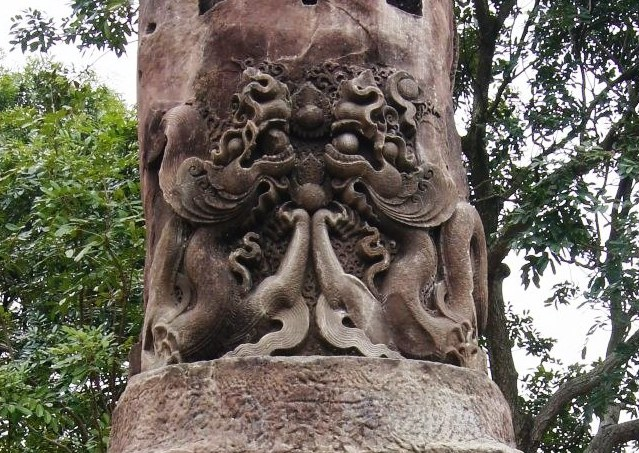
Couple of dragons masonry on the stone pillar of Dam temple, Bac Ninh Province, Ly dynasty period (11–12th century)

=== Prehistory ===
The Vietnamese dragon is the combined image of crocodile, snake, cat, rat and bird. Historically, the Vietnamese people lived near rivers, so they venerated crocodiles as "thuồng luồng" or "Giao Long", the first kind of Vietnamese dragon.

There are some kinds of dragons found on archaeological objects. One group is that of the crocodile-dragons, with the head of a crocodile and the body of a snake. The cat-dragon excavated on a glazed terracotta piece in Bắc Ninh has some features of Đại Việt period dragon: it does not have a crocodile head, its head is shorter and it has a long neck, its wing and backfin are long lines, and its whiskers and fur are found in the Đại Việt dragon image.

=== Ngô dynasty (938–965) ===
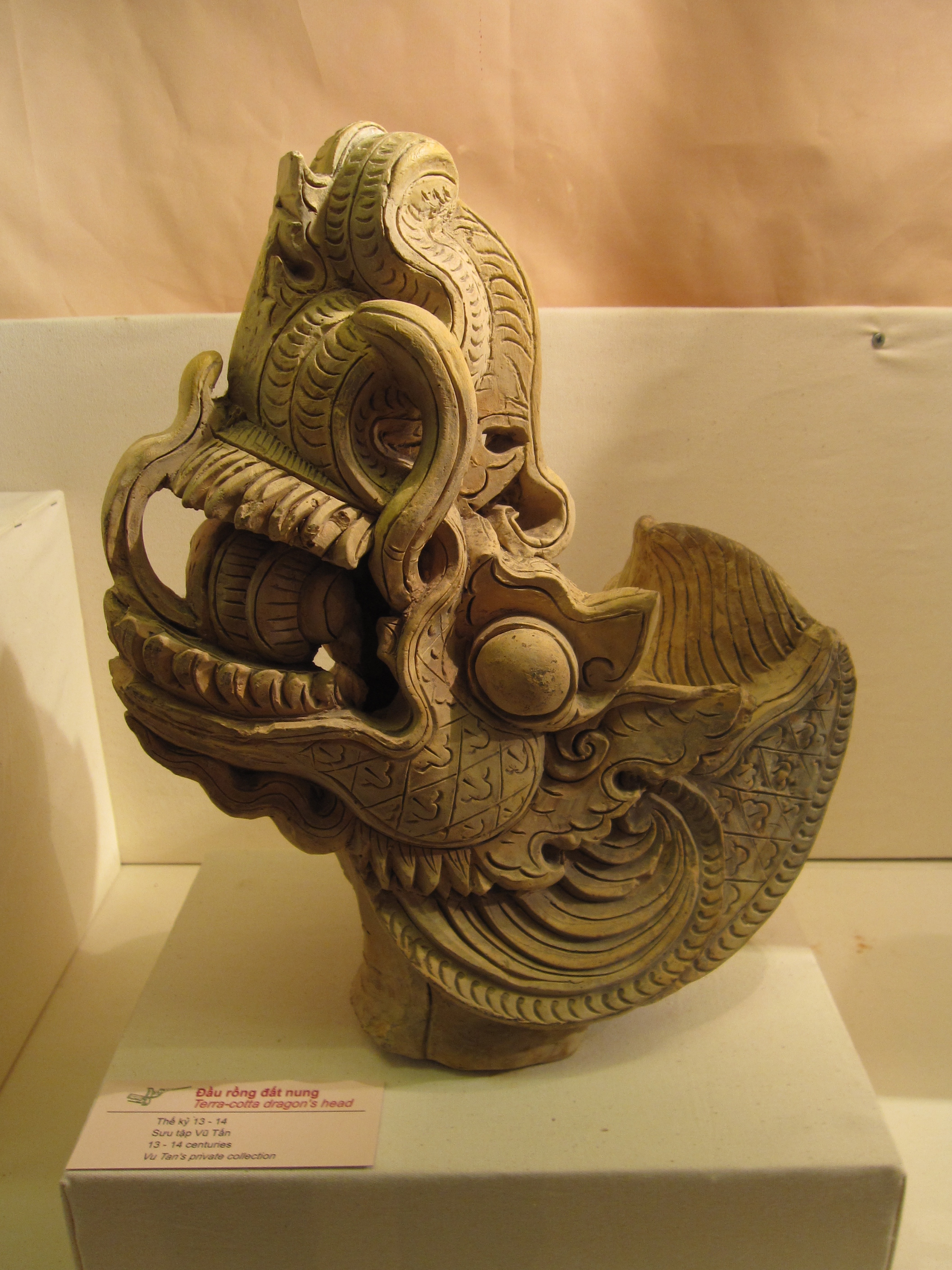
A Lý dynasty terracotta dragon's head.

On the brick from this period found in Cổ Loa, the dragon is short, with a cat-like body and a fish's backfin.

=== Lý dynasty (1010–1225) ===
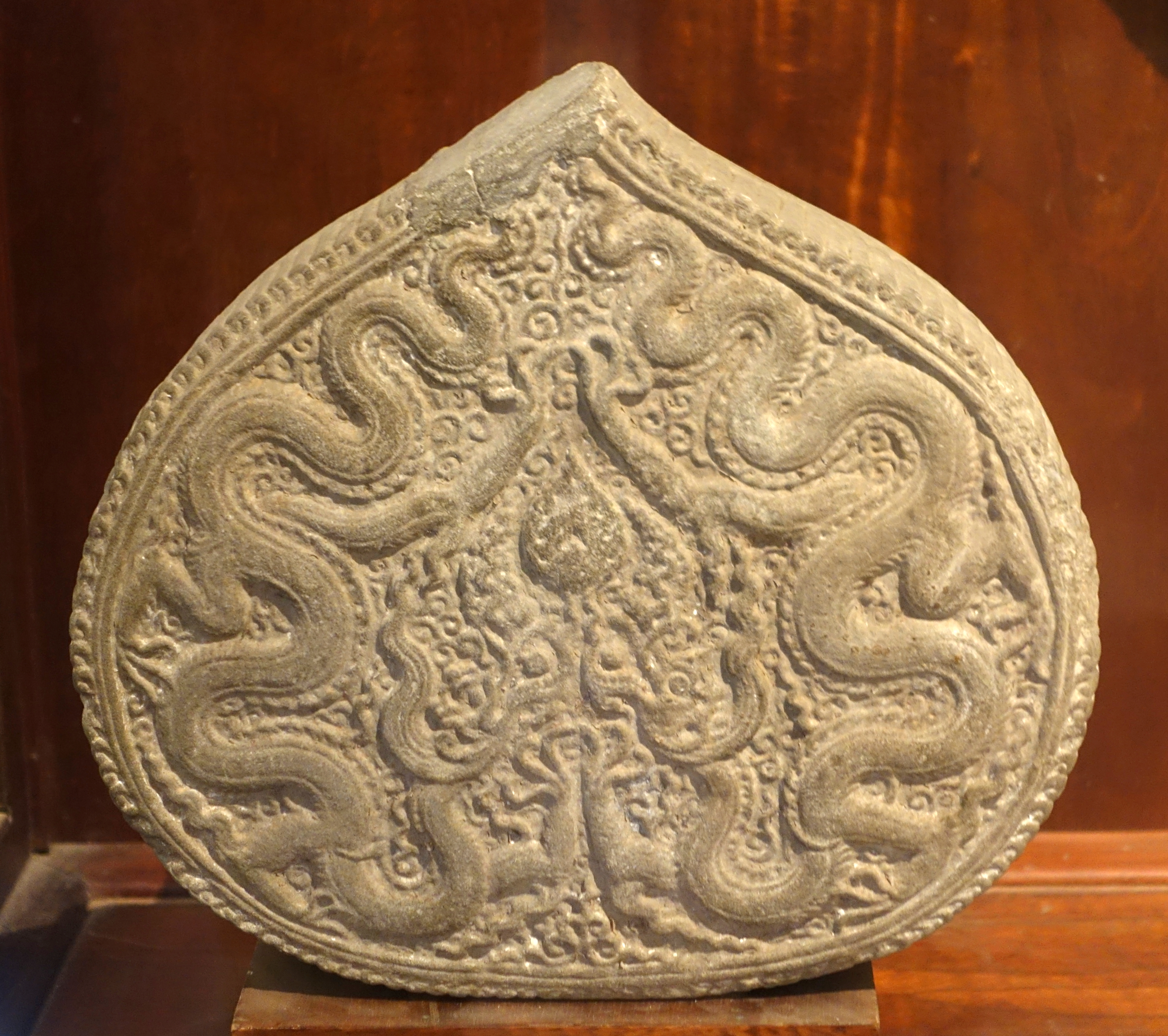
Bodhi tree leaf with dragon carving, a common decorative theme of Ly dynasty

The Lý dynasty is the dynasty which laid the foundation of Vietnamese feudal culture. Buddhism was widespread and Văn Miếu, the nation's first university, was created. The slender, flowing dragon of this period represents the vassal kingdom.

These dragons rounded bodies curve lithely, in a long sinuous shape, tapering gradually to the tail. The body has 12 sections, symbolizing 12 months in the year. On the dragon's back are small, uninterrupted, regular fins. The head, held high, is in proportion with the body along boasting a lustrous, lengthy mane with its beard bore the same charasteristics, prominent eyes, protruding nose crest ( forward-pointing), but no horns. The legs are small and thin, and usually 3-toed. The jaw is opened wide, with a long, thin tongue; the dragons always keep a châu (gem/jewel) in their mouths (a symbol of humanity, nobility and knowledge). These dragons are able to change the weather, and are responsible for crops.

=== Trần dynasty (1225–1400) ===
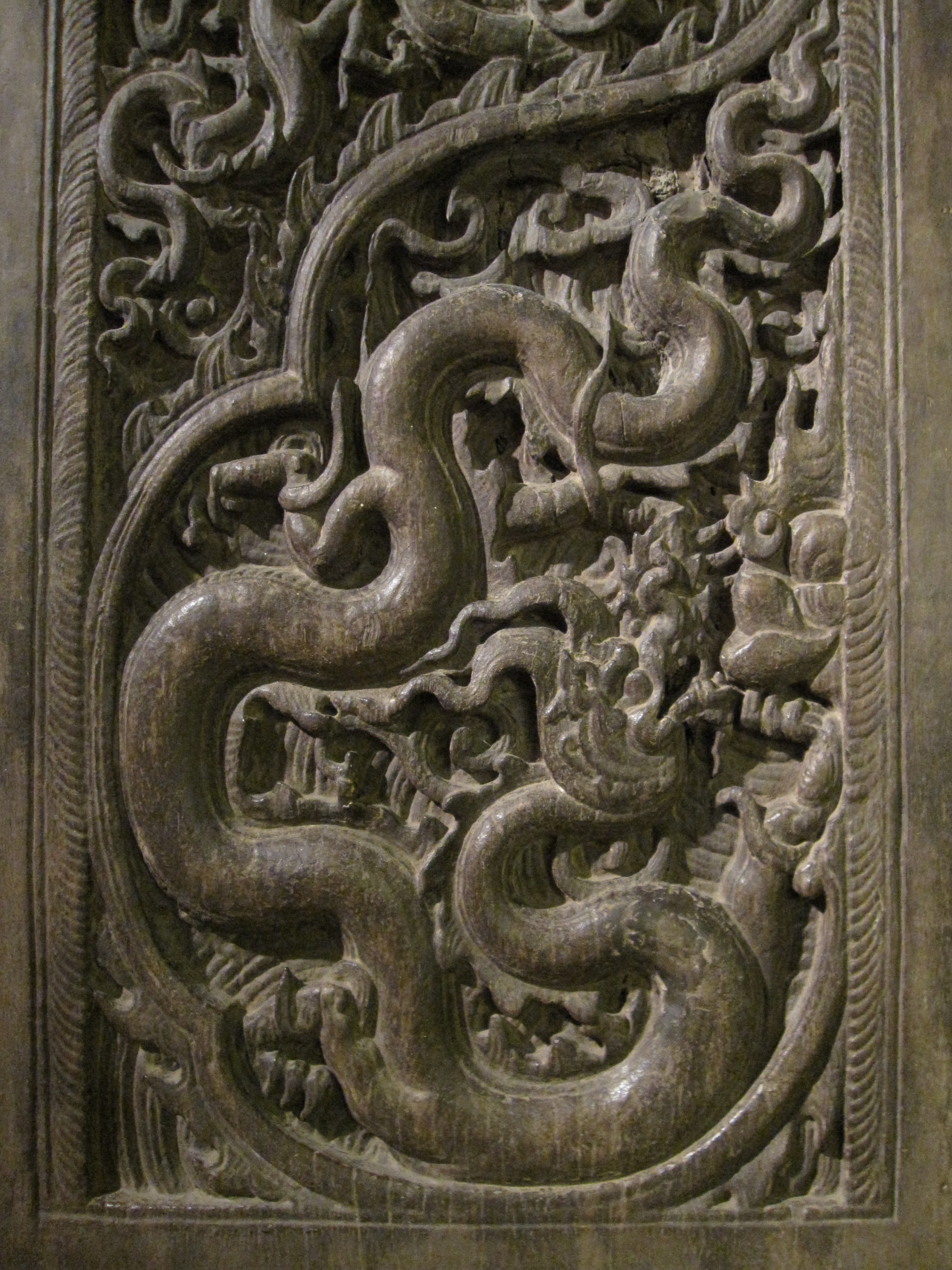
The Trần dragon, wood carving of Phổ Minh Temple, Nam Định province.

The Trần dynasty dragon was similar to that of the Lý dynasty but stood out with a more muscular frame. The Trần dragon had new details: arms and horns. Compared to the dragon of Lý dynasty, its fiery crest became shorter and the curved body compacts down to the tail, lessening the serpentine look of the former dynasty. The dragon's form under the dynasty came in many variations, especially the tail section (straight, pointed, spiral) and the scale (petal shape, crescent, sleek).

The dragon under the dynasty symbolized the martial arts with its robust frame, and reflecting the dynasty's origins who were fishermen in the Northeast of Vietnam (modern day Quảng Ninh province). The Trần dynasty's reign was also one of the most important eras, marking the numerous invasions by the Mongols and followed by repeated incursions by Champa kingdom.

=== Hồ Dynasty (1400-1407) ===
The dragon under the Hồ dynasty depicts a much sleeker, serpentine-like figure which was speculated taken inspirations of the Mã river, the Lèn river and Đáy river as a fluid, fast-moving motion symbolizing the readiness to face the dangers hailing up from north (Mongols) and down in south (Champa kingdom).

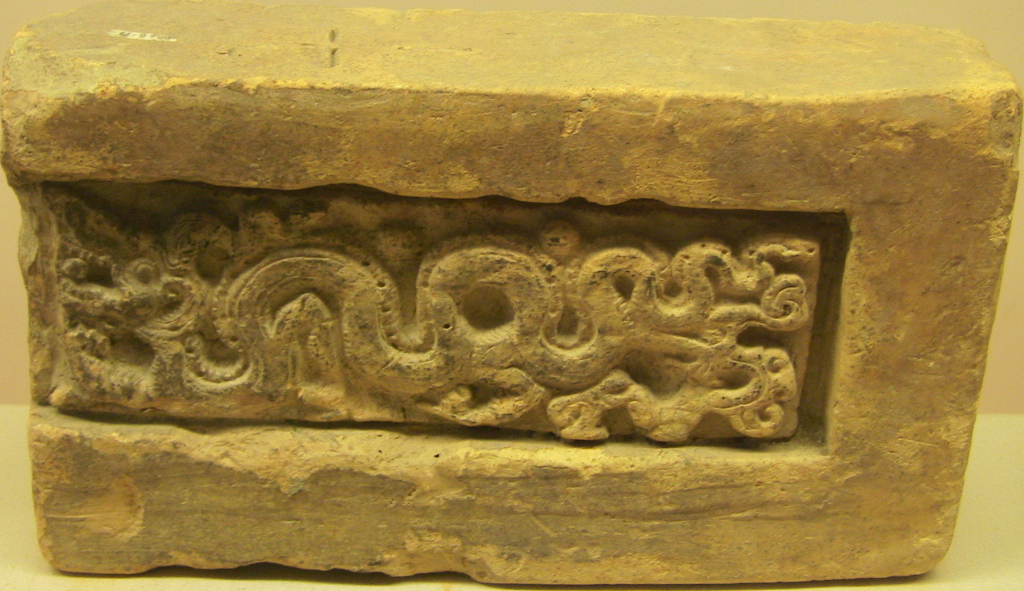
Ornamental brick depicting the dragon under the Hồ dynasty (1400-1407)

The Hồ dynasty dragon bears similar features of the Lý and Trần dynasties, boasting a powerful crest protruding in forward motion but with larger base stretching up the base of the head. Its manes grew longer compared to the previous dynasty, and depicted with 3 toes and petal scales along with a thin, pointy tail tip that flows in a fluid-like manner, aligning with the benevolent characteristics of the typical Vietnamese dragon.

=== Lê – Mạc dynasty ===
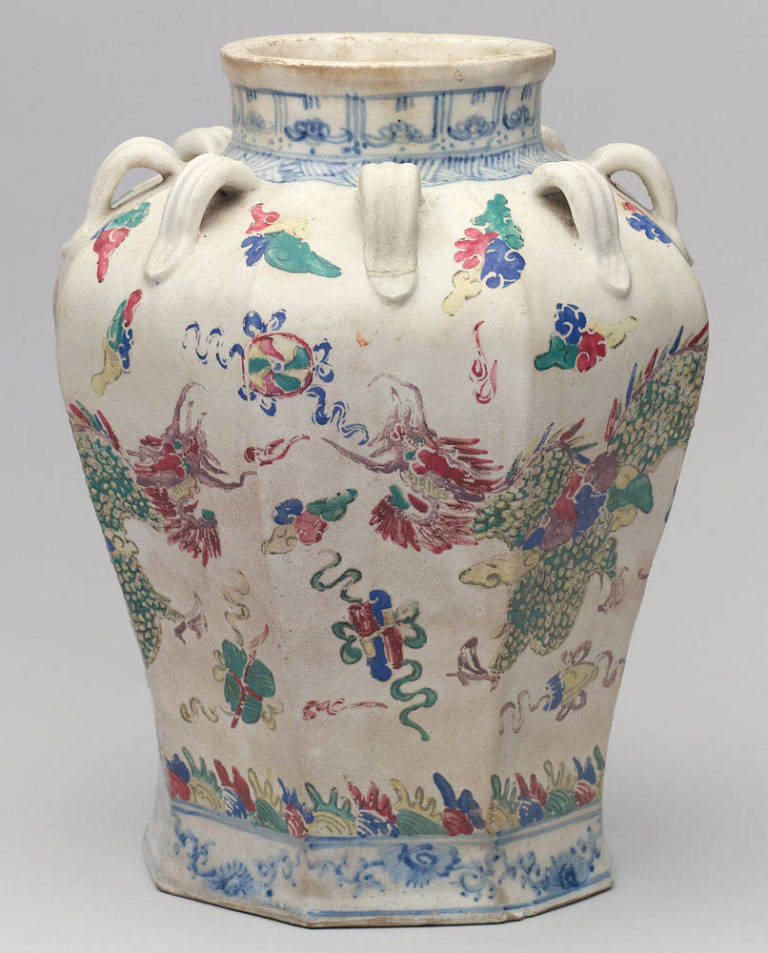
Dragon on 17th century Bát Tràng porcelains

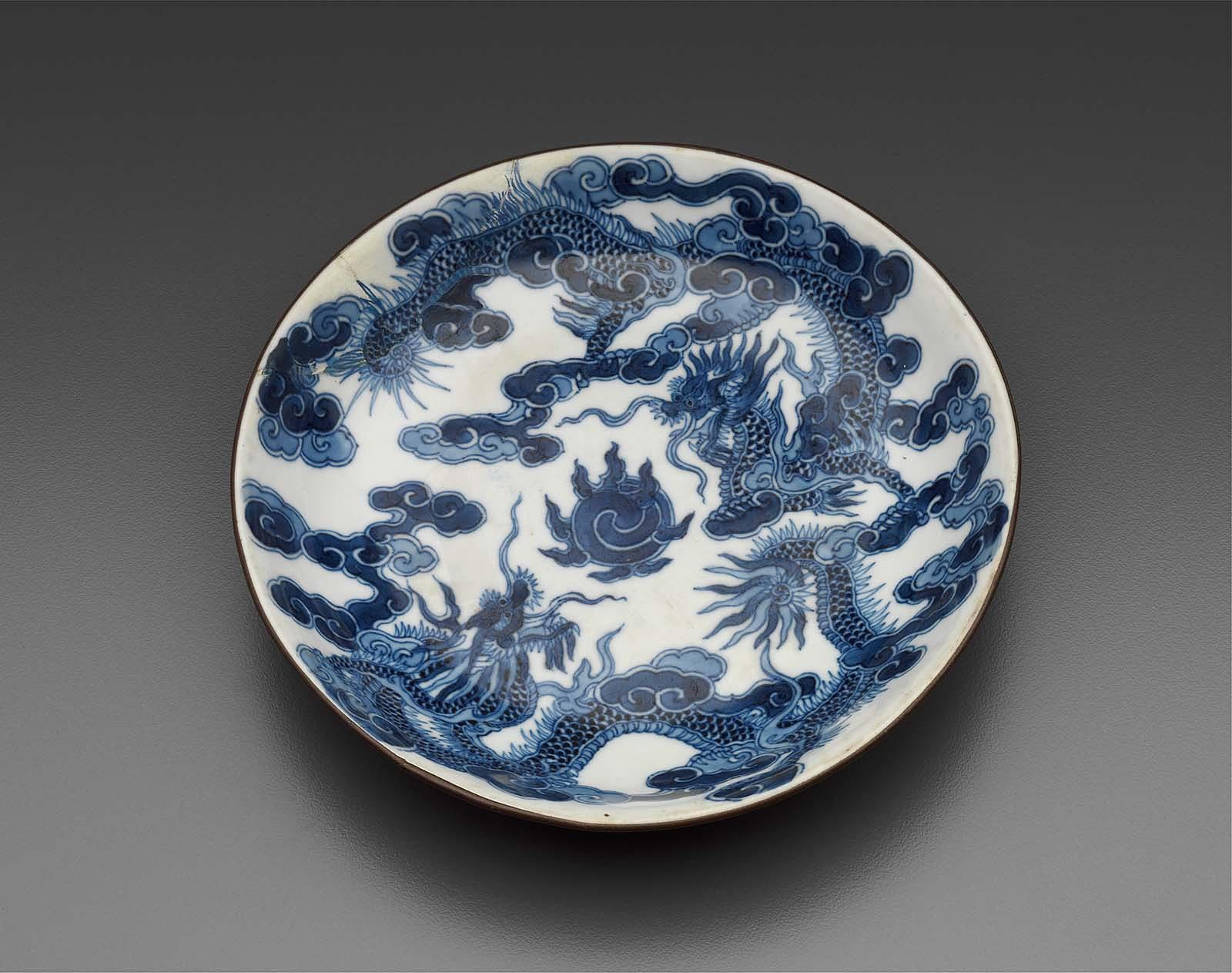
Dragon on a porcelain plate during the reign of Lord Trịnh Doanh

In this period, the Vietnamese dragon's image was evolved into typical form of Vietnam's dragons. Differing from those of the previous dynasty, dragons in this age are not only represented in a curved posture among clouds but also in others. These dragons were majestic, with lion-heads. Instead of a fiery crest, they have a large nose. Their bodies only curve in two sections. Their feet have five sharp claws.

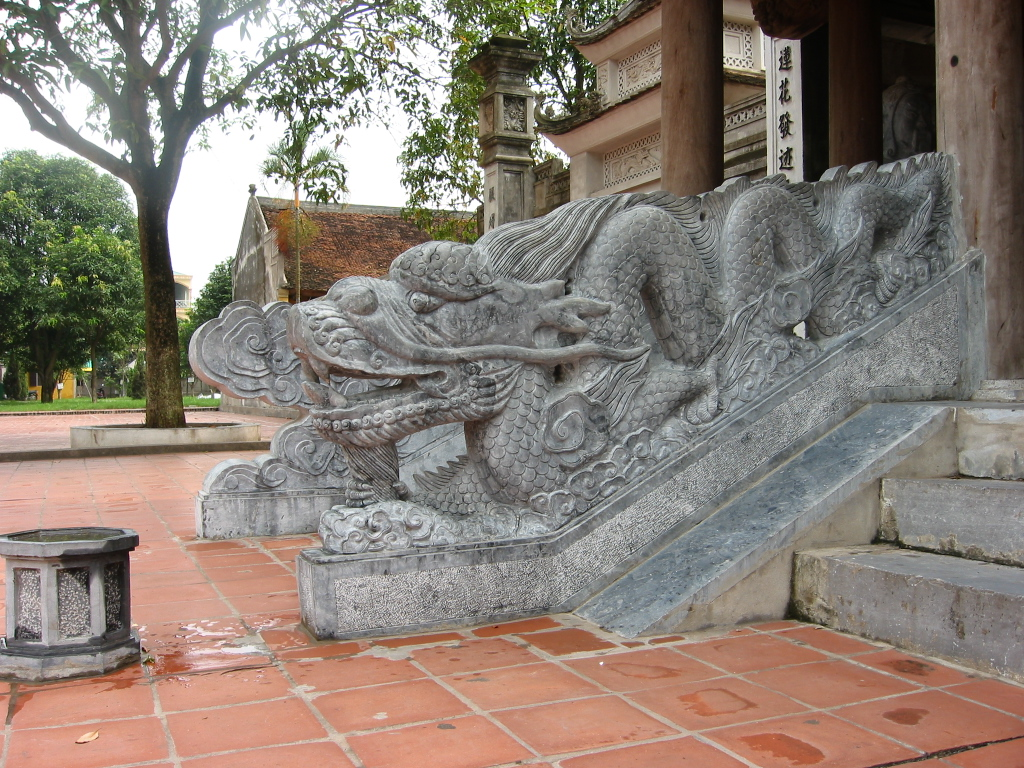
One of four dragons in front of Ngu Long Mon of Lý Bát Đế Shrine, Lê dynasty

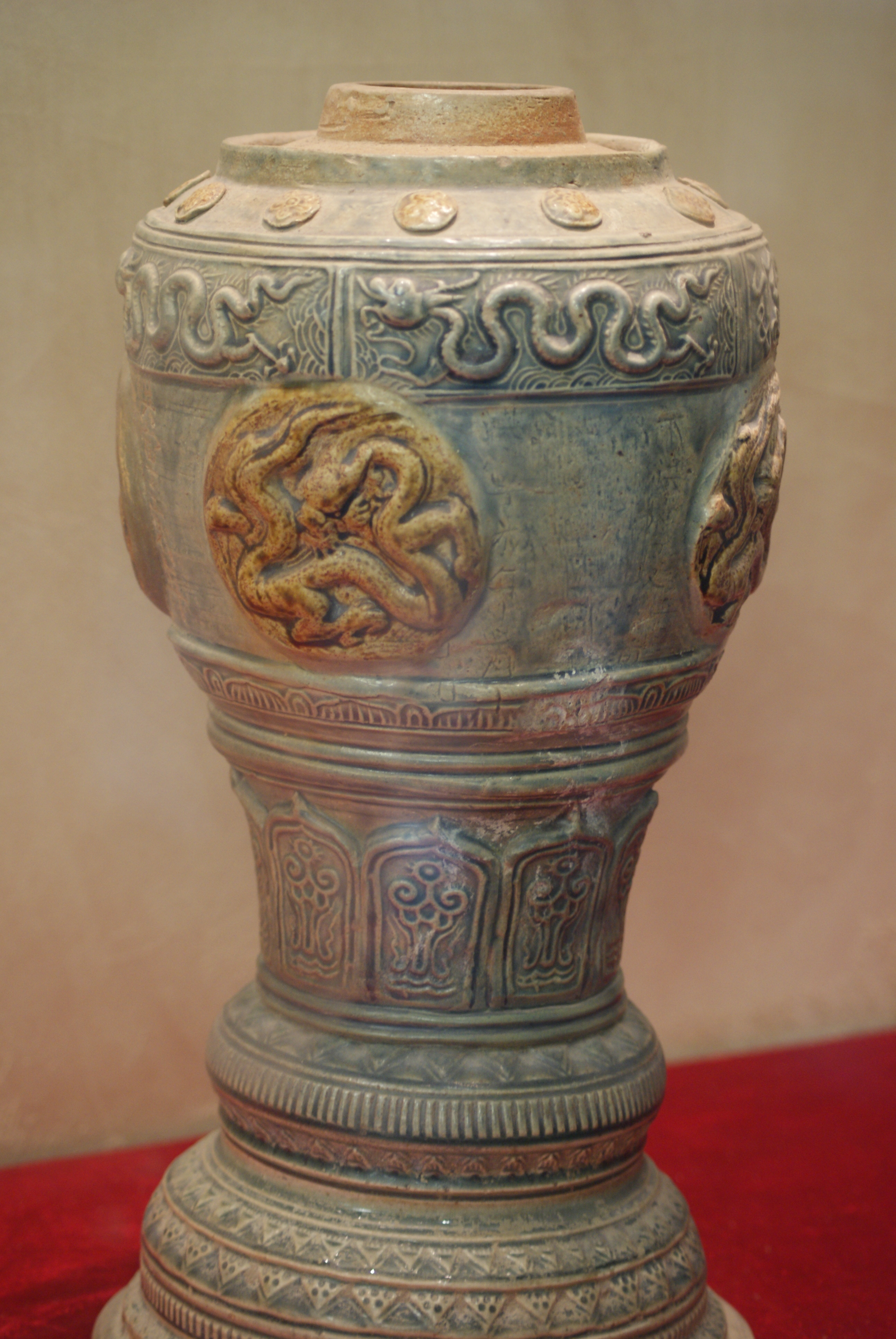
Dragons on a Mạc dynasty oil lamp base

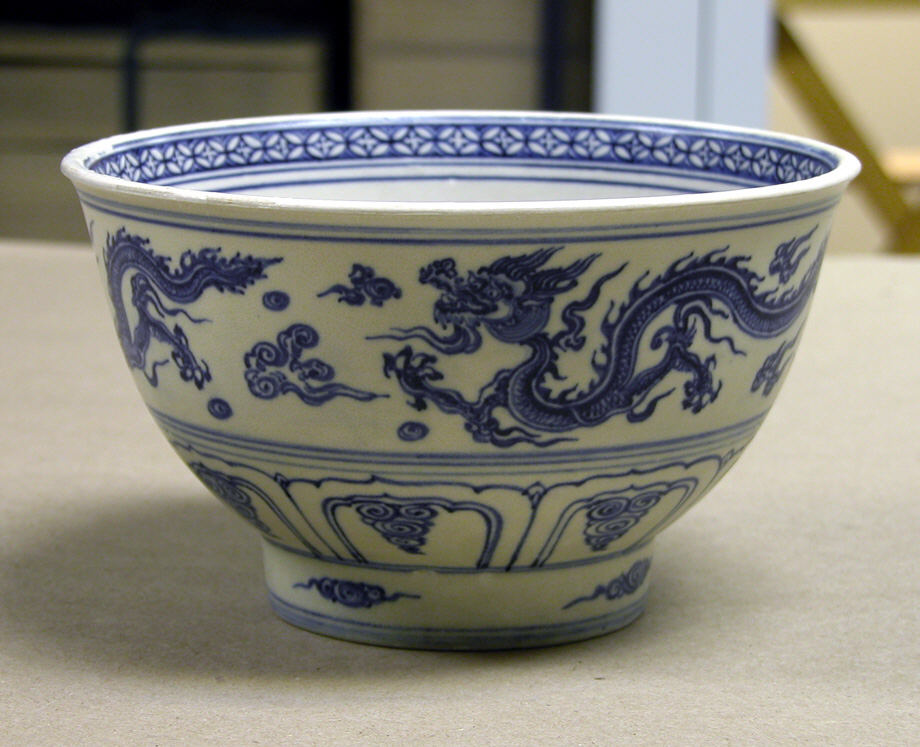
Dragon on Vietnamese ceramics of the 15th century

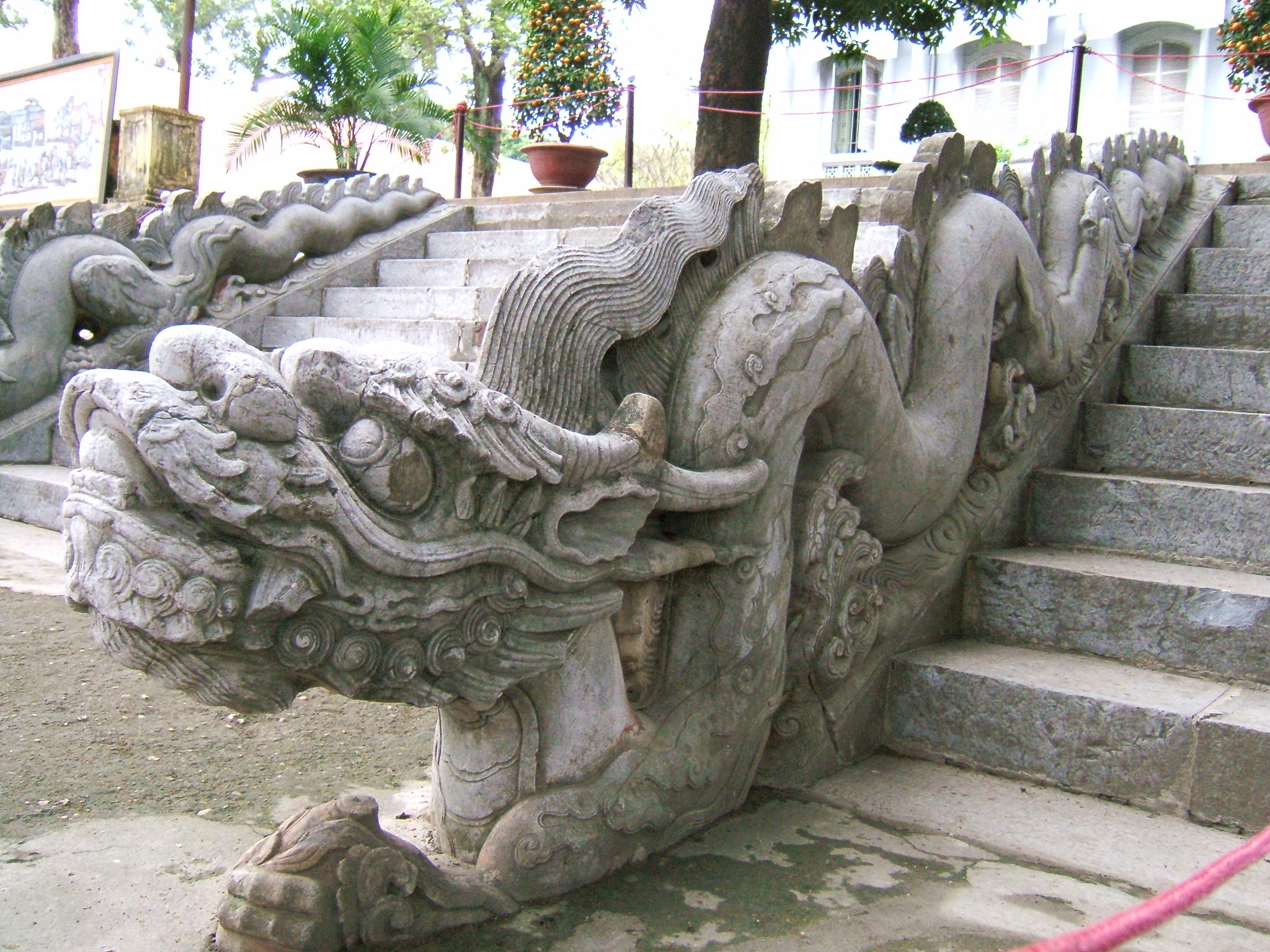
Dragons of Kính Thiên Palace, main hall of the Lê dynasty Imperial Palace

=== Nguyễn dynasty (1802–1945) ===
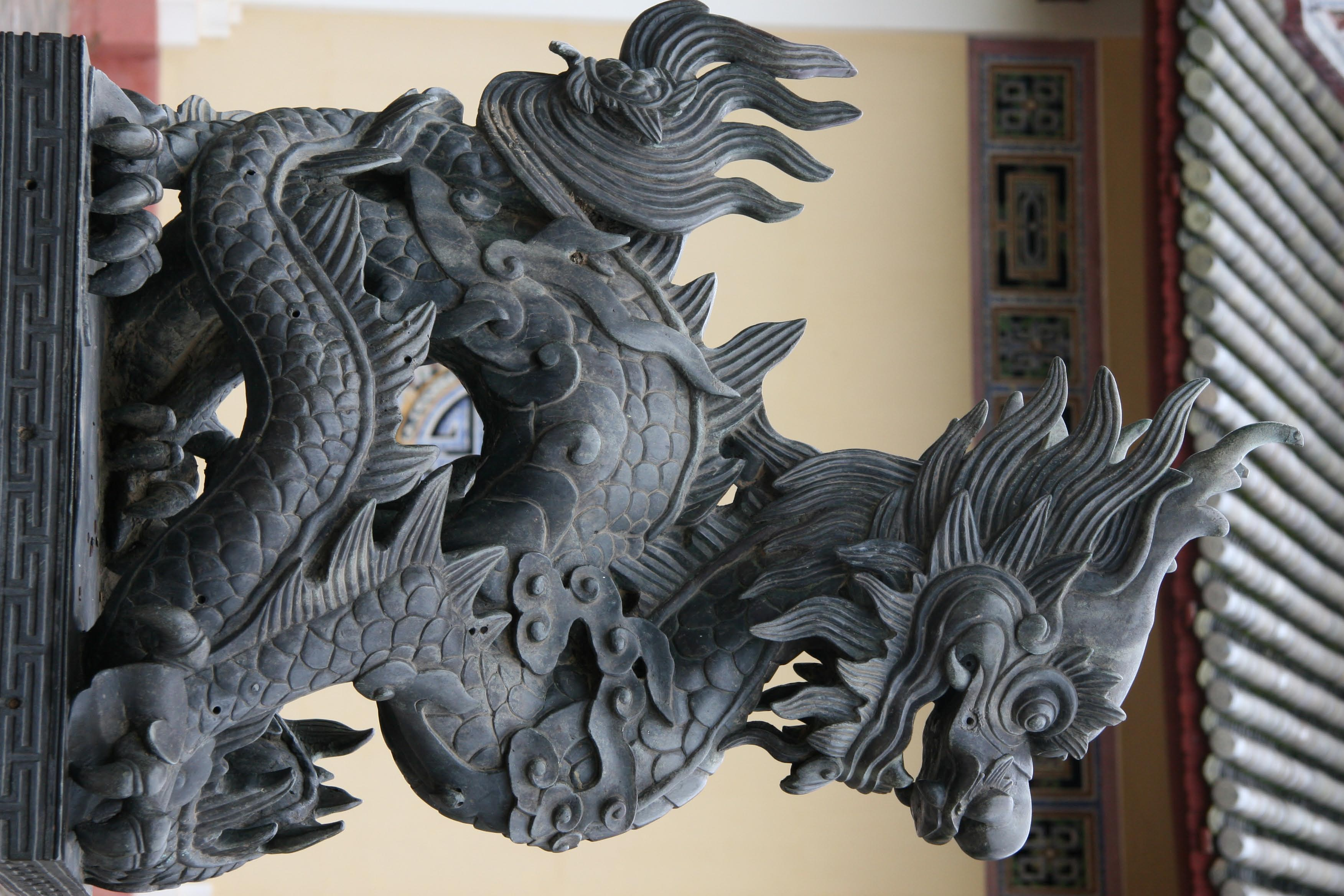
Nguyễn dynasty dragon, Imperial City of Huế

The dragon form of Nguyễn dynasty is the typical dragon of Vietnamese. The dragon is represented with a spiral tail and a long fiery sword-fin. Its head and eyes are large. It has stag horns, a lion's nose, exposed canine teeth, regular flash scale, curved whiskers. Images of the Dragon of the emperor have 5 claws, was also decorated on the crown-prince's gown in motif of "dragon's face" with 4 claws. Dragons of Nguyễn dynasty represent the powerful southern emperors with glory and honor.

== Dragons in literature ==
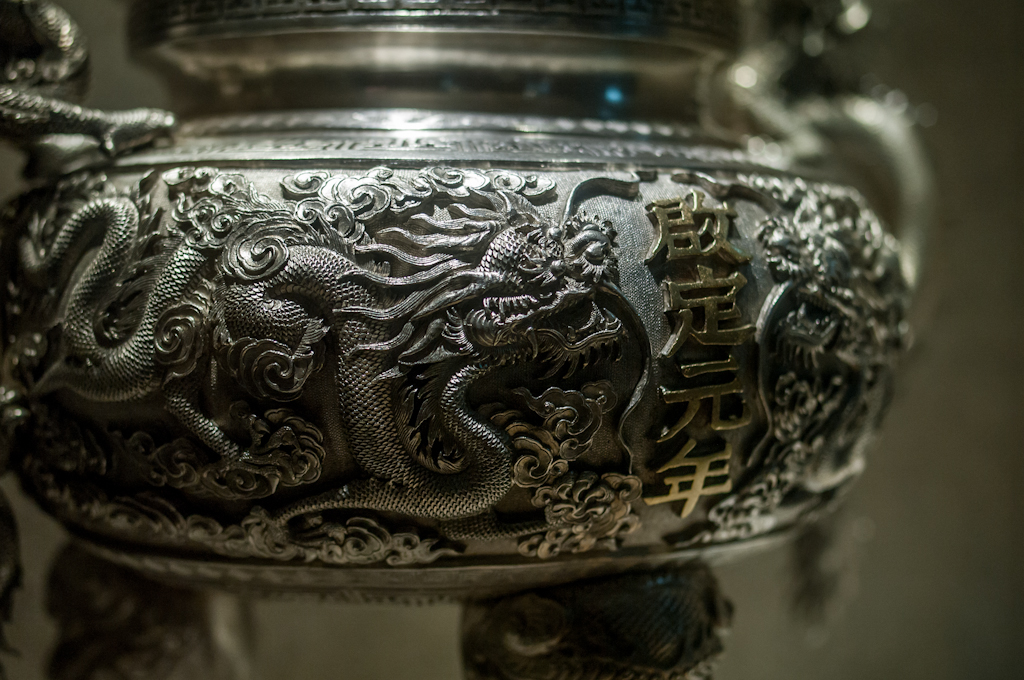
Nguyễn dynasty bronze incense burner

Some proverbs and sayings mention dragons but imply something else:

"Rồng gặp mây": "Like dragons greeting clouds" – favorable conditions.

"Đầu rồng, đuôi tôm": "A dragon's head but a shrimp's tail" – something which starts well but ends badly.

"Rồng bay, phượng múa": "The dragon flies and the phoenix dances!" – Used to praise someone's calligraphy who writes Hán-Nôm ideograms well.

"Rồng đến nhà tôm": "The dragon visits the shrimp's house" – A saying used to dictate behavior between a host and their guest: the host must portray themselves like a humble shrimp and their guest like a noble dragon.

"Ăn như rồng cuốn, nói như rồng leo, làm như mèo mửa": "You consume like a coiled dragon, you talk like a climbing dragon, but your work is like cat's vomit" – A criticism of someone who talks the talk, but does not walk the walk.

== Vietnamese place-names, and other things, named after dragons ==
Hanoi (Vietnamese: Hà Nội), the capital of Vietnam, was known in ancient times as Thăng Long (Chữ Hán: 昇龍 (from Thăng 昇, meaning "to grow, to develop, to rise, to fly, or to ascend" and Long 龍, meaning "dragon")); the capital is still referred to by this name in literature. In 1010, Emperor Lý Thái Tổ moved the capital from Hoa Lư to Đại La, which decision was explained in his Chiếu dời đô (Royal proclamation of moving capital): he saw a Rồng vàng (golden dragon) fly around on the clear blue sky, so he changed the name of Đại La to Thăng Long, meaning "Flying Dragon" which symbolizes "Vietnam's bright and developed future" in the ascending motion. Furthermore, one of Thăng Long Four Defense Deity (Vietnamese: Thăng Long Tứ Trấn) is Long Đỗ Deity (literally: dragon's navel- where is the center, the place that Earth and Sky meet each other- according to orient's view, the belly has a role which is as important as the heart is in western view). Long Đỗ Deity helped Lý Thái Tổ to build Thăng Long citadel.

Many place-names in Vietnam incorporate the word Long, or Rồng ("dragon" in Vietnamese): Hạ Long Bay (vịnh Hạ Long, lit. "Bay of Descending Dragon"), the section of the Mekong river flowing through Vietnam contains 9 branches and is called Cửu Long ("nine dragons"); Hàm Rồng Bridge (lit."Bridge of Dragon Jaw"), Long Biên Bridge. The city of Da Nang has a dragon-shaped bridge, facing the sea. Other things named after dragons include: thanh long (dragon fruit), vòi rồng (waterspout), xương rồng (Cactaceae), long nhãn (dragon eyes: Vietnamese cognate word for longan fruit).

== Dragons as a national symbol ==
The Vietnamese dragon has been depicted multiple times as national symbols on flags, national emblems, and currency.

A blue Vietnamese dragon.

A green Vietnamese dragon.

A gold Vietnamese dragon.

Pennant of the Nguyễn dynasty emperor.

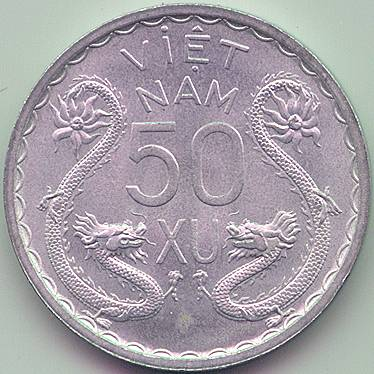
A 50 xu coin issued by the State of Vietnam (1953).

Coat of arms of the State of Vietnam (1954-1955).

Flag of the Vietnamese National Army (1954-1955).

South Vietnam's coat of arms from 1967 to 1975.

Vietnamese Five Colours Flag with dragon

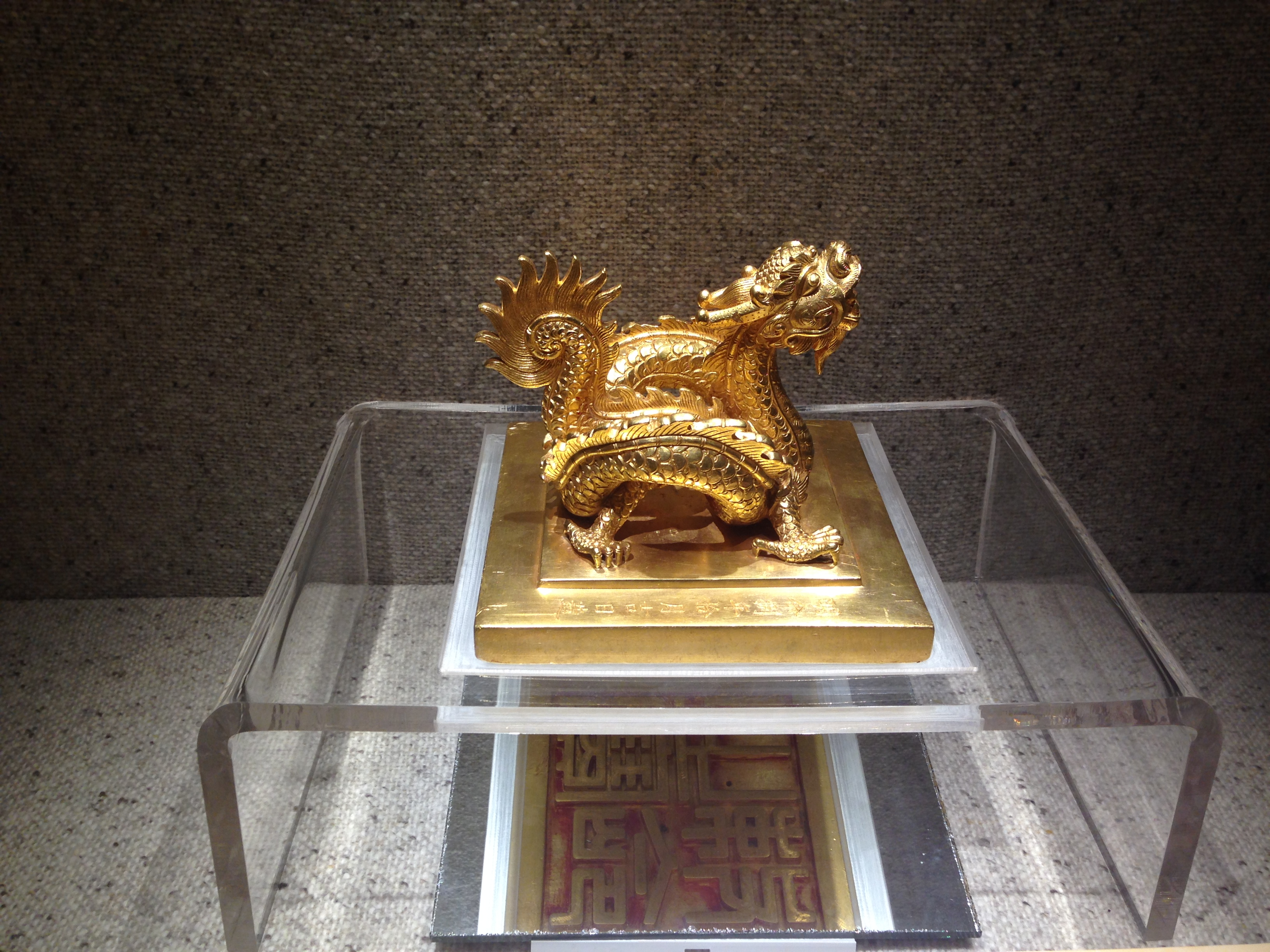
Seal of the Nguyễn dynasty, depicts a dragon with 5 claws.

== See also ==
- Vietnamese mythology
- Bhutanese Druk
- Chinese dragon
- Japanese dragon
- Korean dragon
