= Hanoi Ceramic Mosaic Mural =

Public artwork in Vietnam

Hanoi Ceramic Mosaic Mural (Hanoi Ceramic Road)
- Con đường Gốm sứ
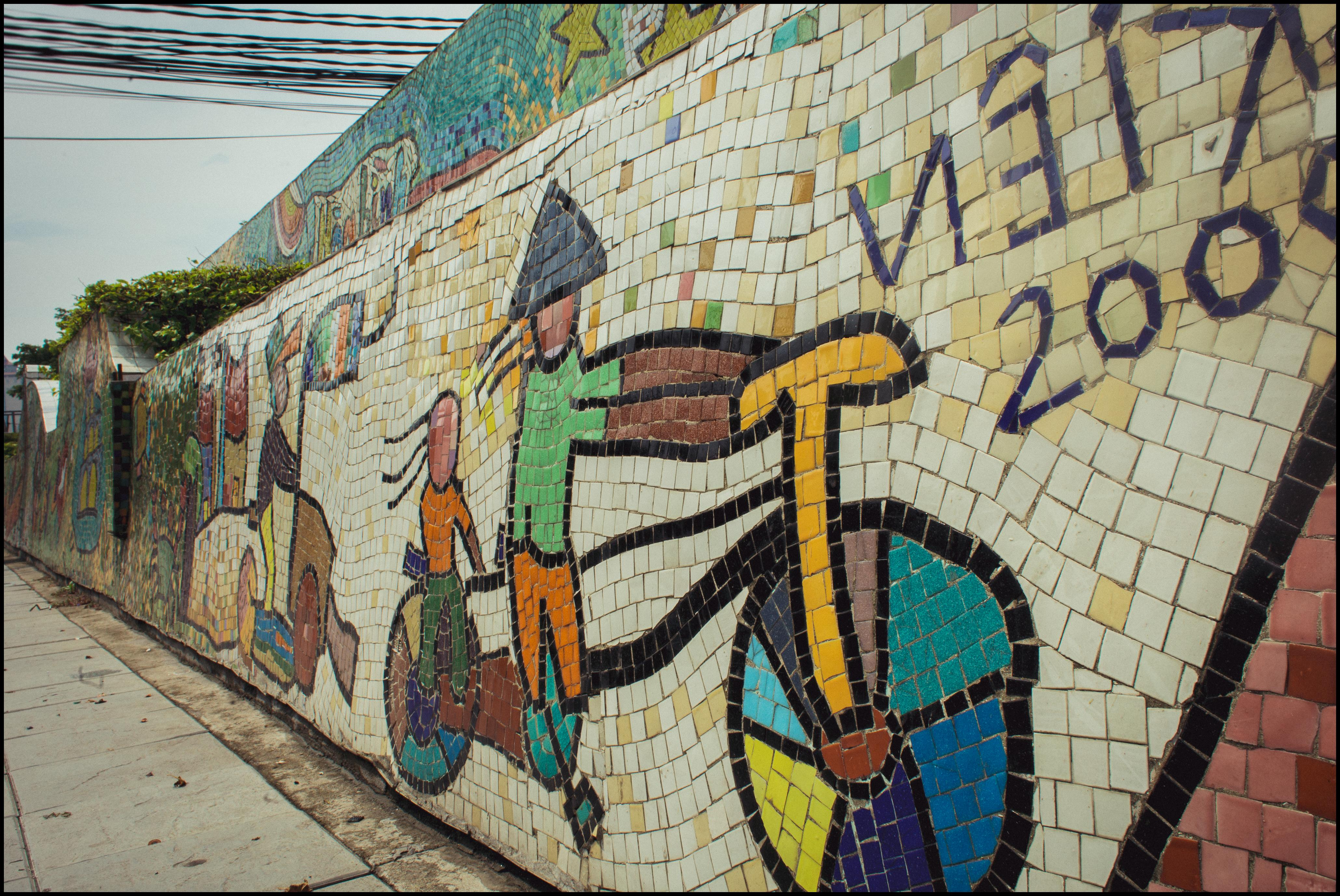
- Mural panel with bicyclist
- Interactive map of the Hanoi Ceramic Mosaic Mural (Hanoi Ceramic Road) area

General information
- Status: Completed
- Location: Hanoi, Vietnam
- Coordinates: 21.045356°N 105.845973°E
- Construction started: 2007
- Completed: 2010 (with occasional additions)

Dimensions
- Other dimensions: 4 km (2.5 mi)

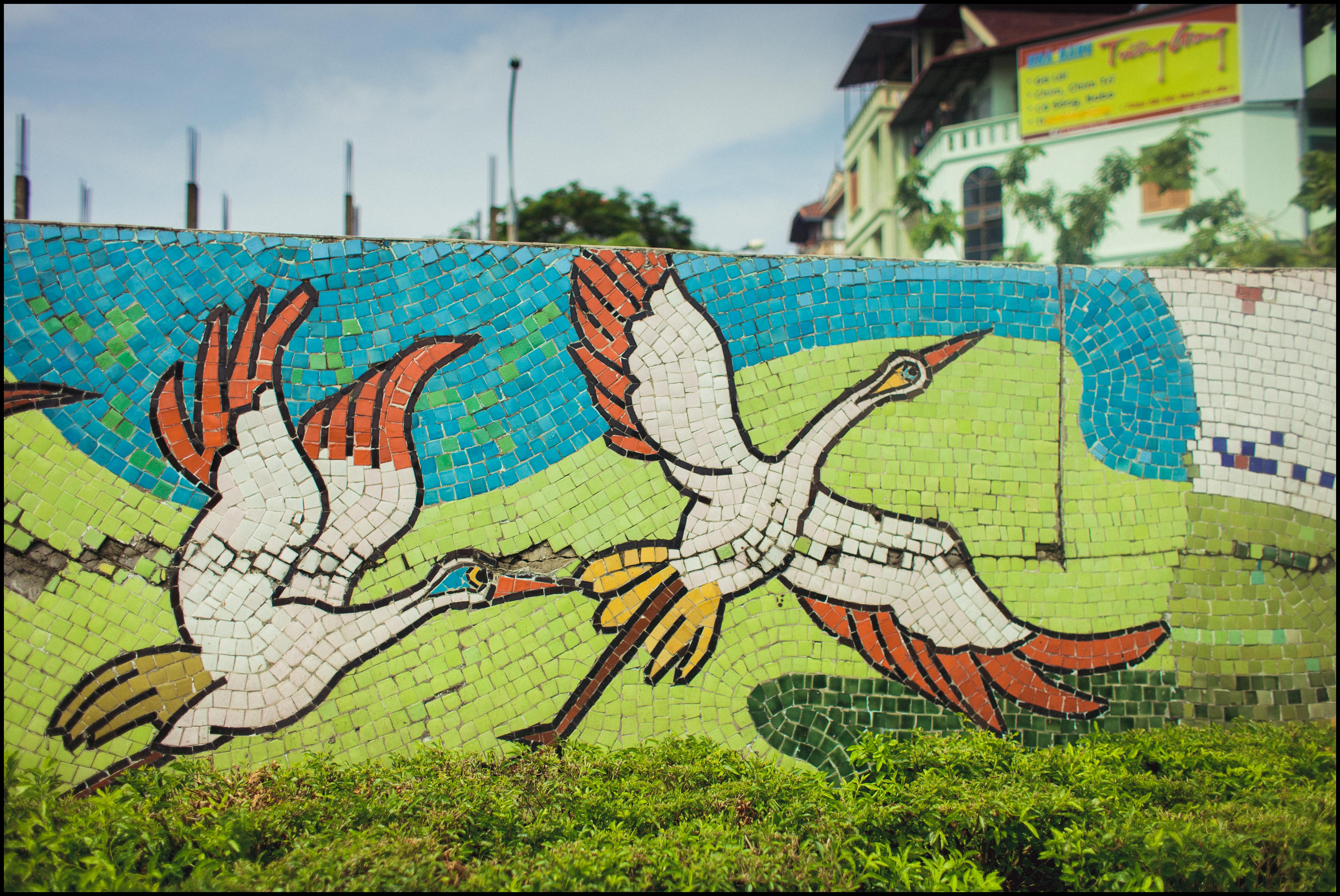
Mural panel with waterfowl.

Hanoi Ceramic Mosaic Mural, or Hanoi Ceramic Road (Vietnamese: Con đường Gốm sứ), is a ceramic mosaic mural along the walls of the Red River dike system in the city of Hanoi, northern Vietnam.

With a length of about 6.5 kilometres (4.0 mi), the 'Ceramic Road' is one of the major projects that were developed on the occasion of the Millennial Anniversary of Hanoi.

== History ==
The Hanoi Ceramic Road originated with the journalist Nguyễn Thu Thủy, who won a prize in the Hanoi architecture contest for her idea of transforming the dike system around Hanoi into a ceramic mosaic.

The work of decoration began in 2007 for the dike wall of about 6.000m in length and 0.95m in height which runs along the road of Âu Cơ, Nghi Tàm, Yên Phụ, Trần Nhật Duật, Trần Quang Khải, Trần Khánh Dư and terminates at the pier of the Long Biên Bridge. She was supported by the Ford Foundation, which funded the first 450 metres (1,480 ft) of the wall; and the planning, training, and infrastructure needed to complete the project. The Ceramic Road was planned to be finished in 2010 to commemorate the Millennial Anniversary of Hanoi in October 2010.

Participating in the work of decoration are not only Vietnamese artists but also foreign embassies and cultural centres in Hanoi such as the Goethe-Institut, Alliance française L'espace, British Council, Società Dante Alighieri Dalte Centre, and other cultural centres of Russia and South Korea.

== Description ==
The mosaic wall mural is made from ceramic tesserae which are product of Bát Tràng, a nearby village famous for its Bát Tràng porcelain.

The content of the mosaic represents the decorative pattern from different periods in the history of Vietnam: Phùng Nguyên culture; Đông Sơn culture; Lý dynasty; Trần dynasty; Lê dynasty and Nguyễn dynasty. Also incorporated on the wall are modern art works, paintings of Hanoi, and children's drawings.

=== Guinness World Record ===
Ms. Nguyen Thu Thuy said the project will strive to make it into the Guinness Book of World Records for the 'World's largest ceramic mosaic' by 2010. On 5 October 2010, Guinness World Records adjudicator, Beatriz Fernandez, undertook an official review of the Hanoi ceramic mosaic to confirm its dimensions and ensure the strict guidelines relating to the record had been followed. Ms Fernandez confirmed that at 3,850 linear meters (6,950m²) of the Hanoi Ceramic Mosaic Mural was the world's largest ceramic mosaic and awarded a Guinness World Records certificate.

Chilean artist Alexandro Mono Gonzalez completed a new segment of the Mural on 18 September 2017. Another segment about Sri Lanka was sponsored by the Sri Lankan Embassy and completed on 22 January 2019. A newly built segment of the concrete dike is expected to have murals on it as well, as the 900-meter-long stretch is currently left plain and attacked by graffiti.

== Gallery ==
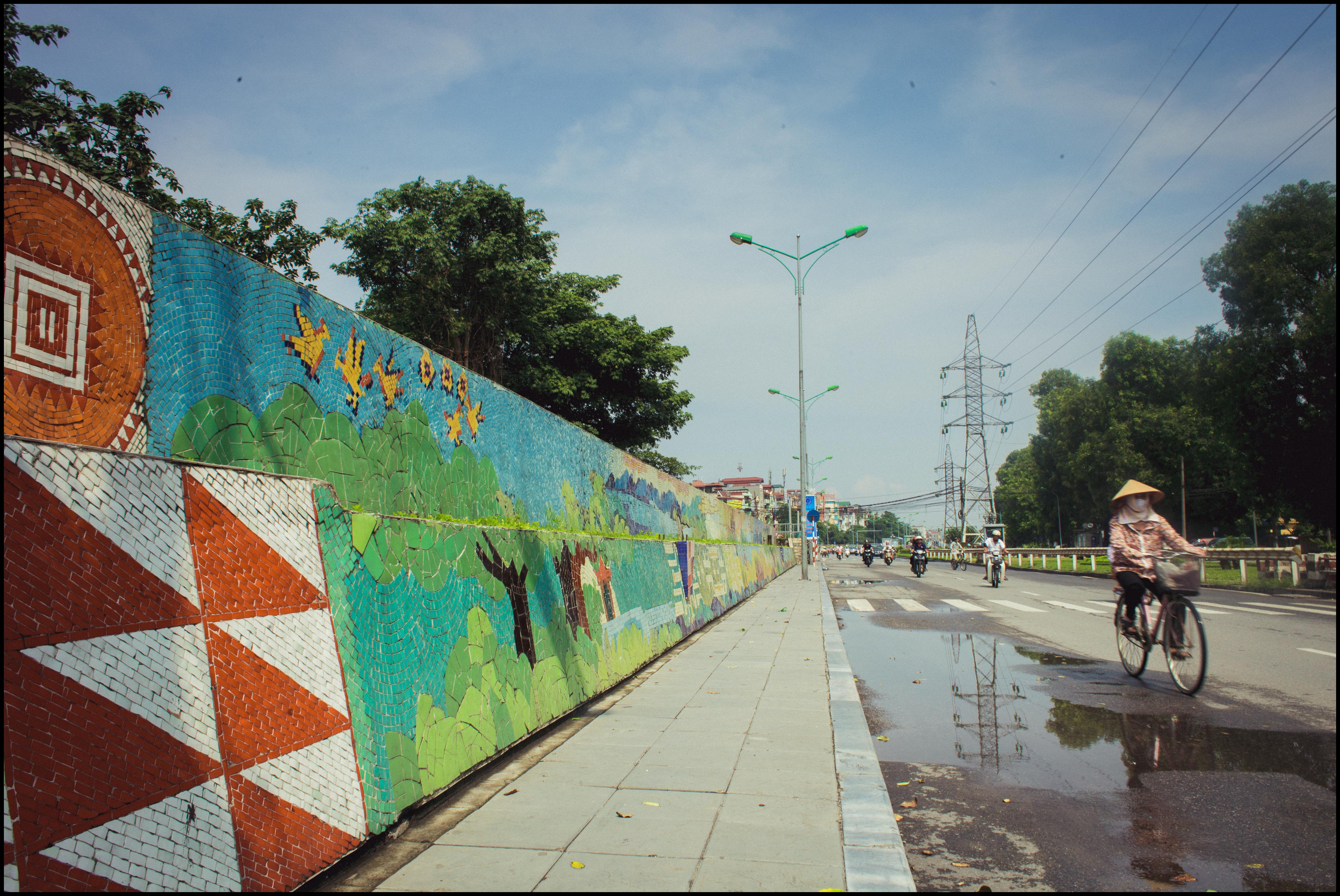
Along Hanoi Ceramic Road

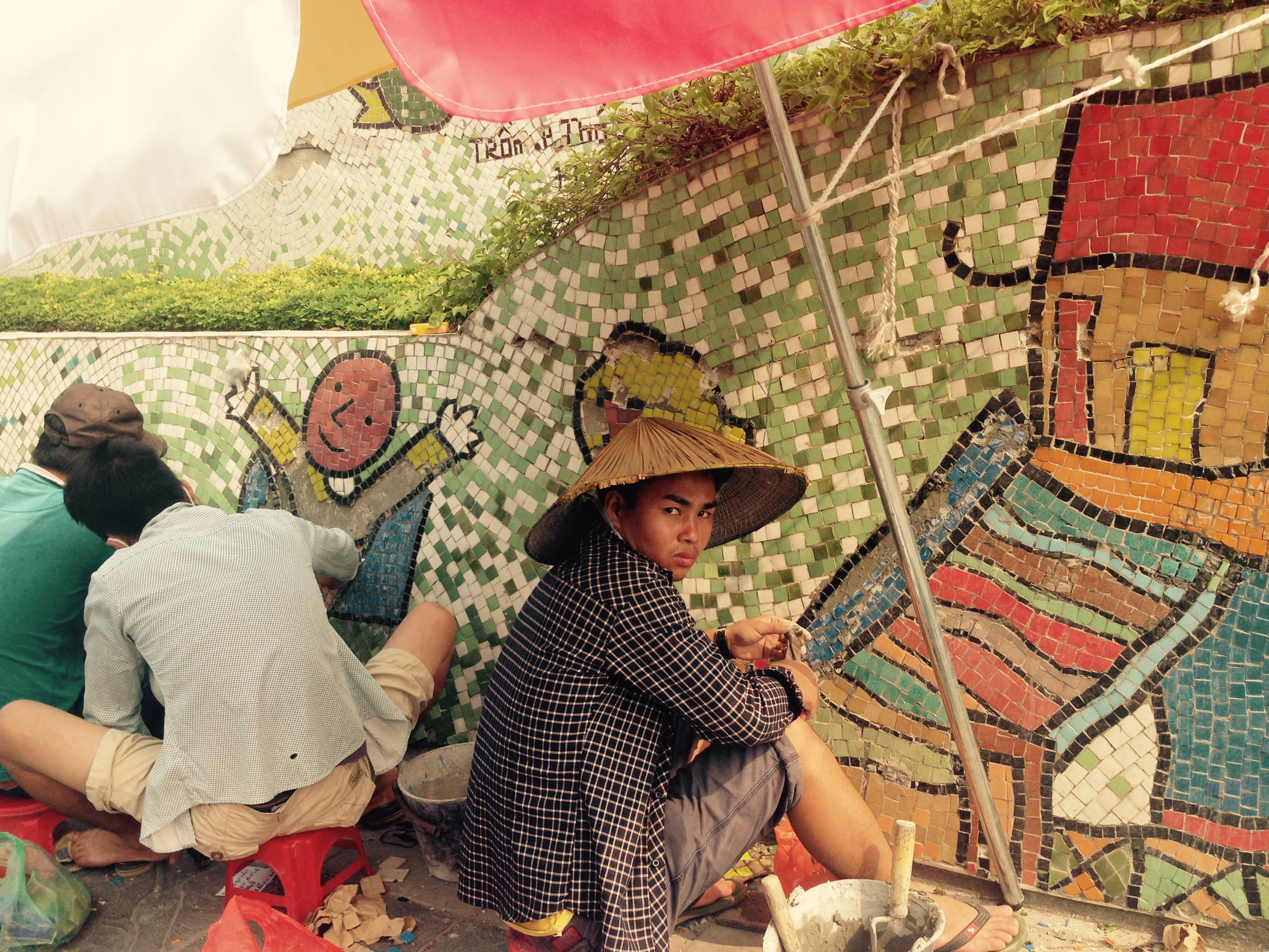
Mural restoration in 2015

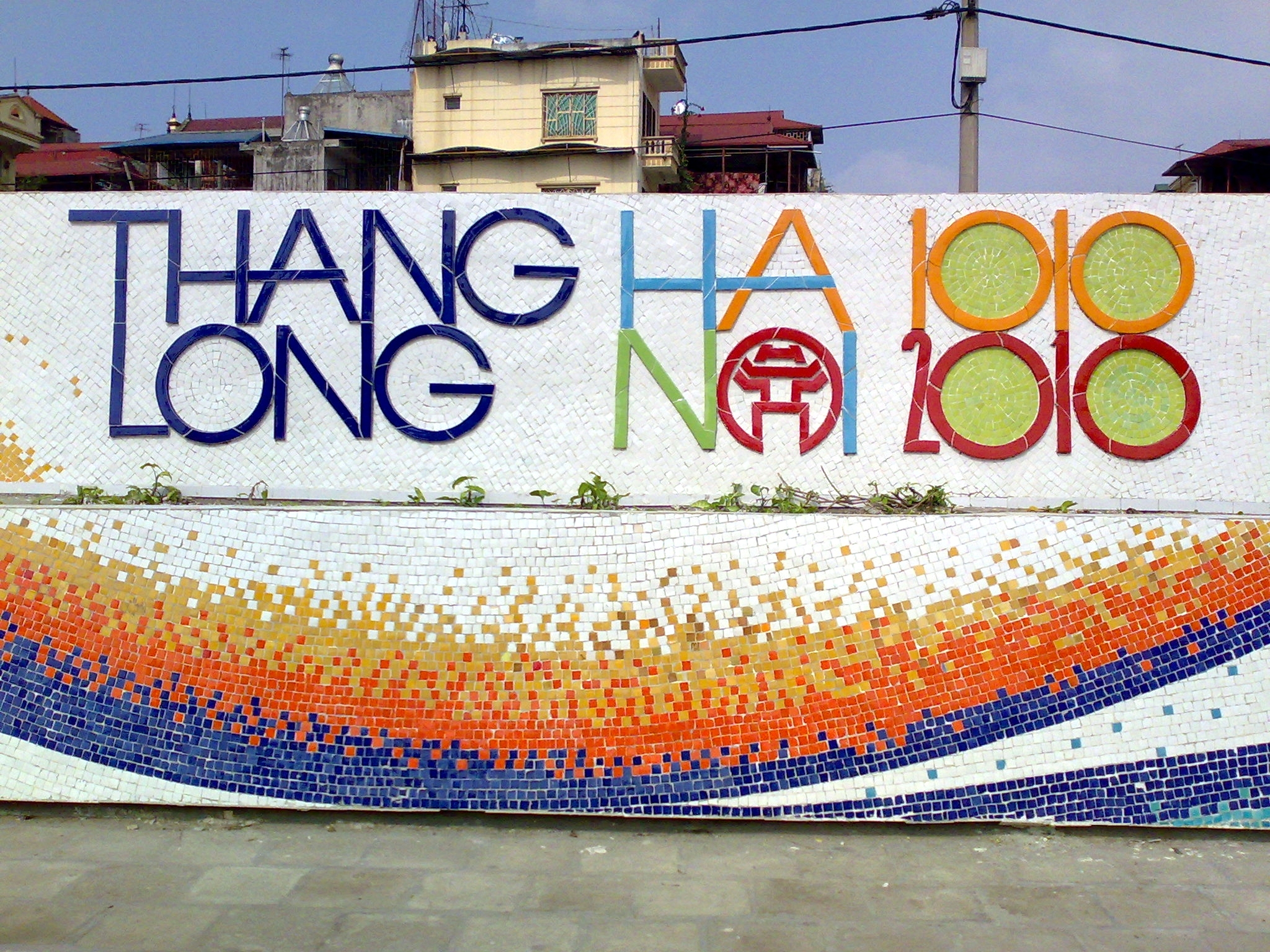
Honoring Millennial Anniversary of Hanoi in 2010

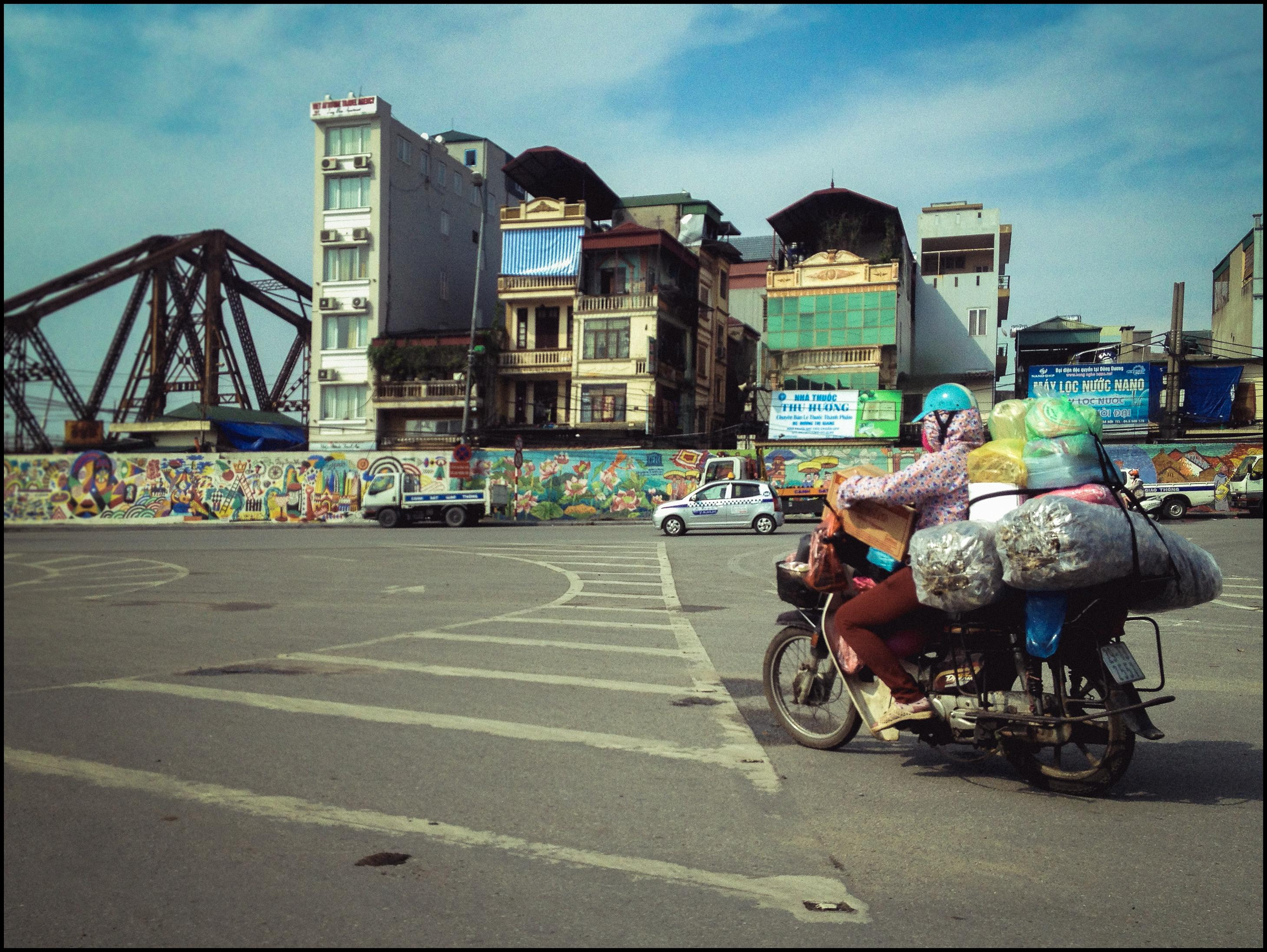
View across Hanoi Ceramic Road
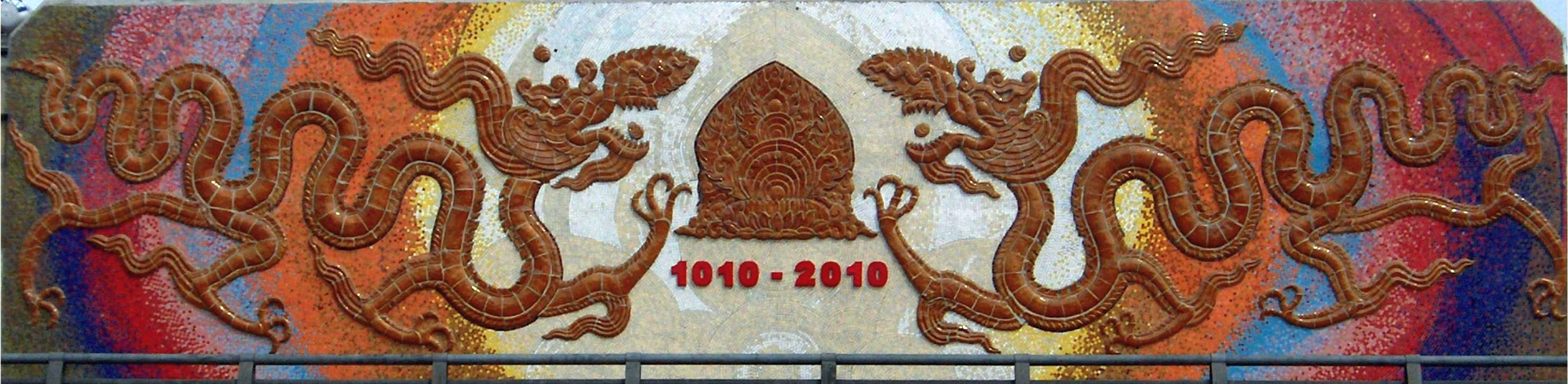
Vietnamese dragon ceramic panel at Chuong Duong Bridge for Millennial Anniversary of Hanoi.

== See also ==
- Media relating to Hanoi Ceramic Mosaic Mural in Wikimedia Commons
- Ceramic sculptures
- Murals in Vietnam
- Vietnamese art
