= Bát Tràng Pottery Museum =

- Bảo tàng gốm Bát Tràng
- Location within Vietnam
- Established: 2021
- Location: 28 Thôn 5, Bát Tràng, Gia Lâm district, Hanoi, Vietnam
- Coordinates: 21°0′14″N 105°54′32″E
- Type: Pottery museum
- Architect: Hoàng Thúc Hào
- Website: tinhhoalangnghe.vn

The Bát Tràng Pottery Museum (Vietnamese: Bảo tàng gốm Bát Tràng), is a museum in Hanoi, Vietnam, focused on the history, techniques, and cultural significance of traditional Vietnamese pottery, particularly from the Bát Tràng village.

== Overview ==
The museum is located on a 3,700-square-meter site in Bát Tràng village, with a building area of 3,300 square meters. Its design, inspired by a potter's wheel, consists of seven interconnected spiral blocks in earthy tones resembling clay and river sediment. Construction began in 2018 with an investment of approximately 150 billion VND (around US$6.5 million) and was completed in 2021. The structure received the Gold Award at Vietnam's National Architecture Awards in 2023 for its integration of traditional elements with modern design.

Exhibits cover multiple floors, displaying the historical development of Bát Tràng pottery, including genealogies of 19 artisan families, production processes, and interactive areas for visitors to experience pottery making. The museum also includes contemporary art galleries, research facilities, a restaurant, cafe, auditorium, homestay options, and creative studios. These amenities support educational programs, artisan training, and cultural events aimed at preserving and promoting Vietnamese pottery traditions.

== History ==
Construction of the museum started in 2018 under the direction of architect Hoàng Thúc Hào, with a total investment of 150 billion VND. It was nearing completion by early 2021 and opened to the public soon after. The museum has supported tourism recovery in the area following events such as flooding. Since opening, it has hosted exhibitions, fashion shows, and educational initiatives, including collaborations with international artisans.

== Architecture ==
The museum's architecture features a design based on the potter's wheel, with seven spiral blocks that interconnect to create dynamic spatial patterns. The color scheme draws from the sediment of the Red River, and the building includes a roof garden, a recreated central kiln, and multi-level spaces for exhibitions and visitor interactions.

== Exhibits and facilities ==
The museum's collections trace the origins and evolution of Bát Tràng pottery, featuring the lineages of 19 artisan families, detailed production methods, and thematic displays. Visitors can participate in hands-on pottery activities in designated areas. Higher floors accommodate art centers, dining options, and lodging facilities.
