= Nguyễn Thu Thủy (artist) =

Vietnamese artist

- Born: 1971 (age 54–55); Hanoi, Vietnam
- Education: University of Languages and International Studies, Hanoi, Vietnam
- Known for: Painting, Mosaic, Ceramic art
- Notable work: Hanoi Ceramic Mosaic Mural

Nguyễn Thu Thủy (born 1971) is a Vietnamese artist who currently works for the Hanoi New Newspaper. She is the holder of the Guinness World Records for the Largest Ceramic Mosaic.

== Guinness World Record (2010) ==
The Hanoi Ceramic Mosaic Mural along the Red River was made by Nguyễn Thu Thủy to commemorate the Millennial Anniversary of Hanoi. The project was funded by the Ford Foundation with the participation of local and foreign artists.

Her art contribution wins the Guinness World Records for the Largest Ceramic Mosaic on May 5, 2010:

- Total length: 3.85 km (2.39 mi)
- Area: 6,950 m^{2} (74,800 sq ft)
- Implementation time: 3 years (from October, 2007 to October 5, 2010)
- Location: along the way from the beginning of Tran Khanh Du street to the end of Nghi Tam street, Hanoi, Vietnam
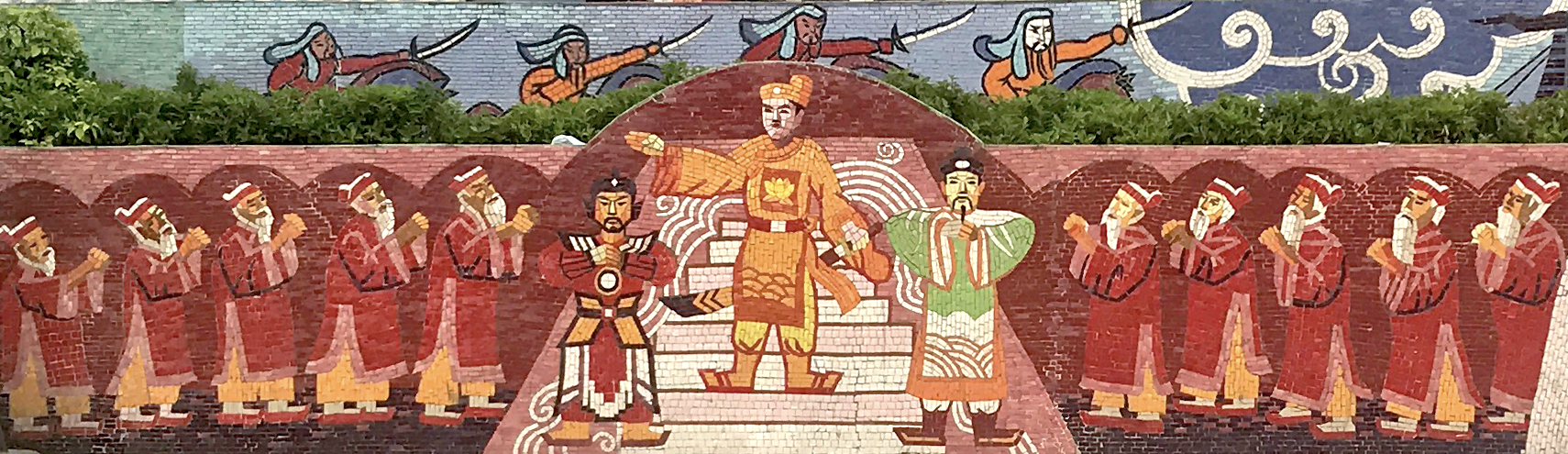

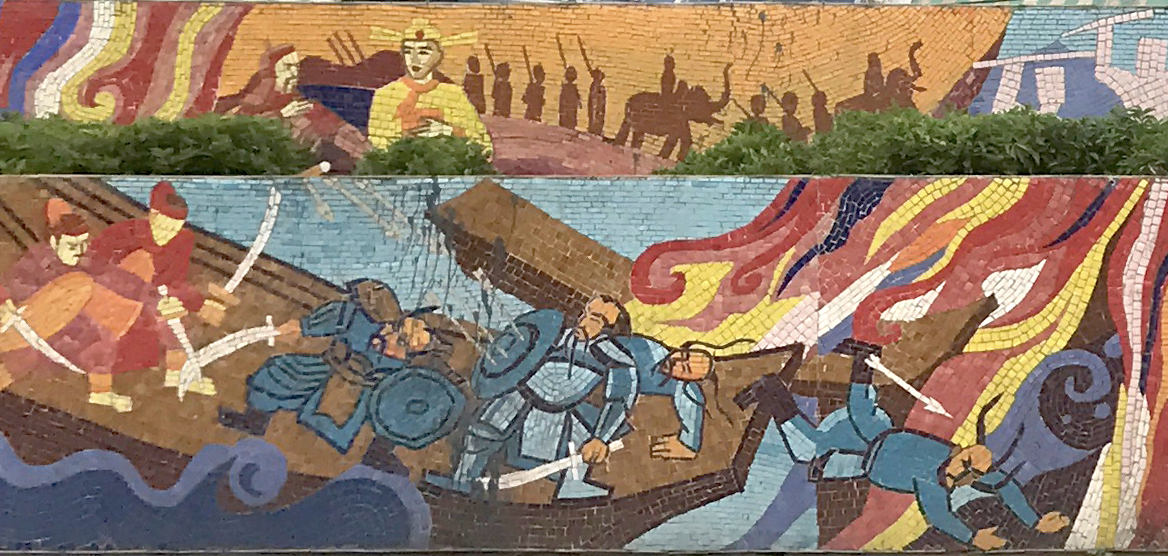

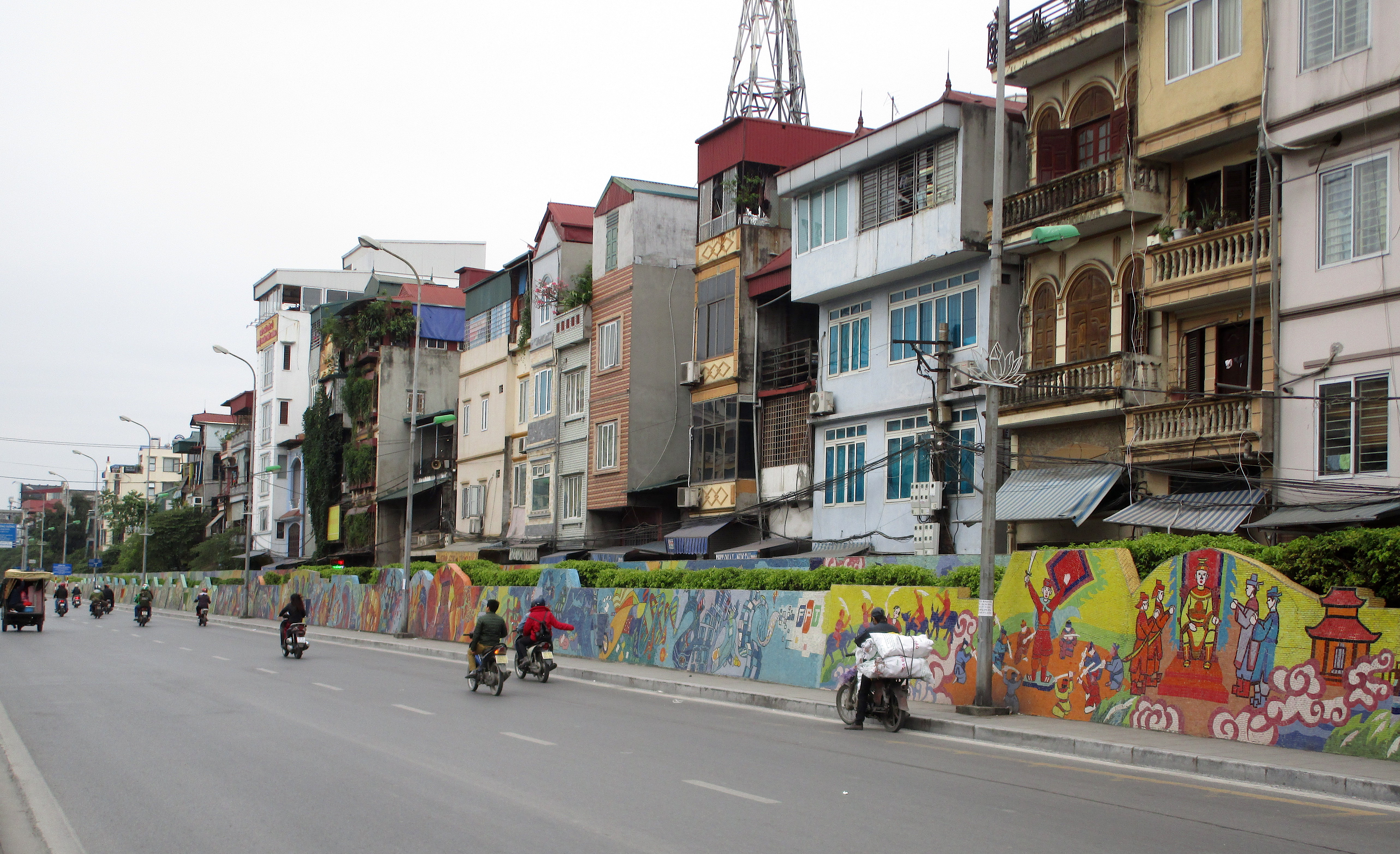

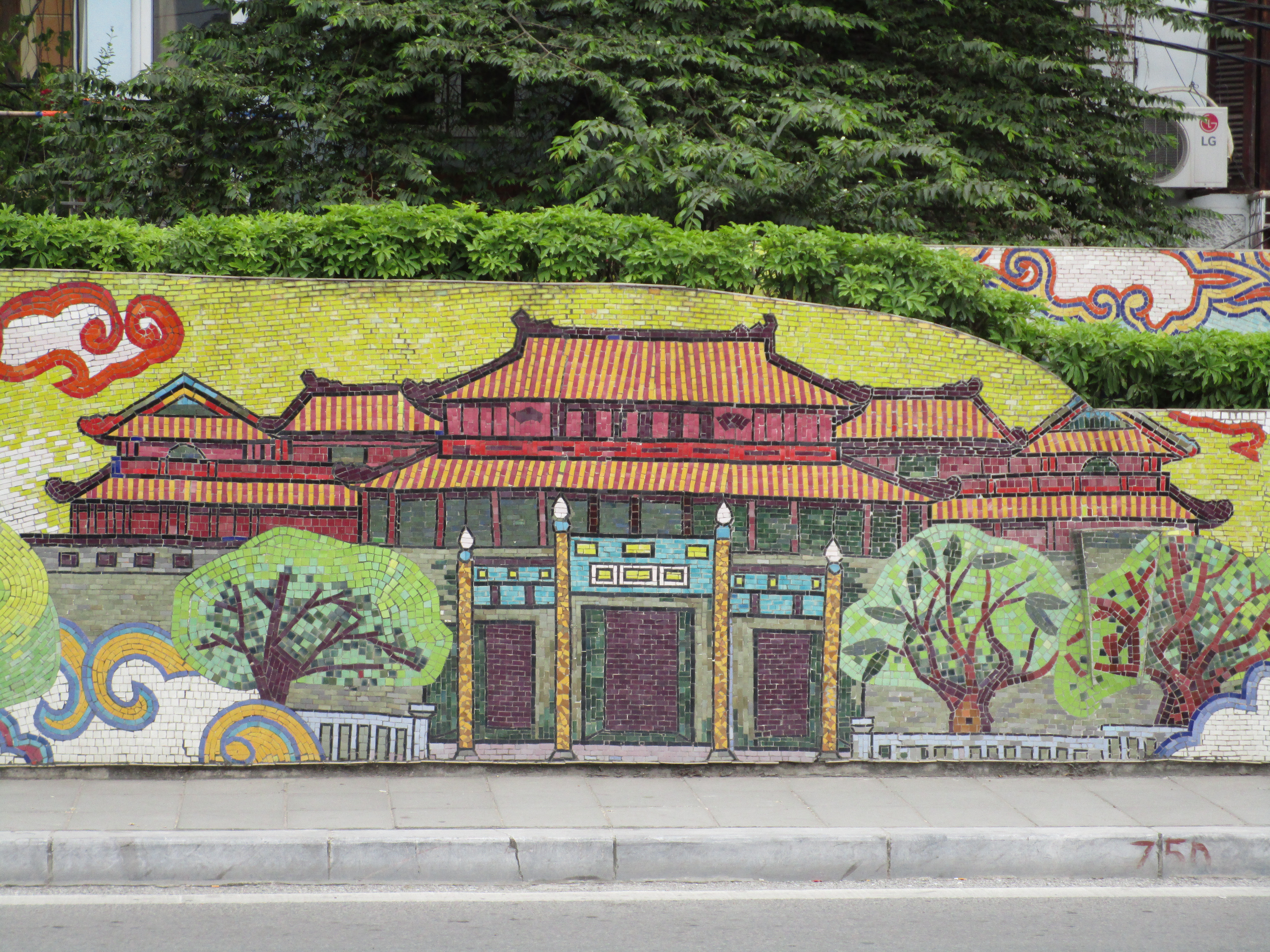

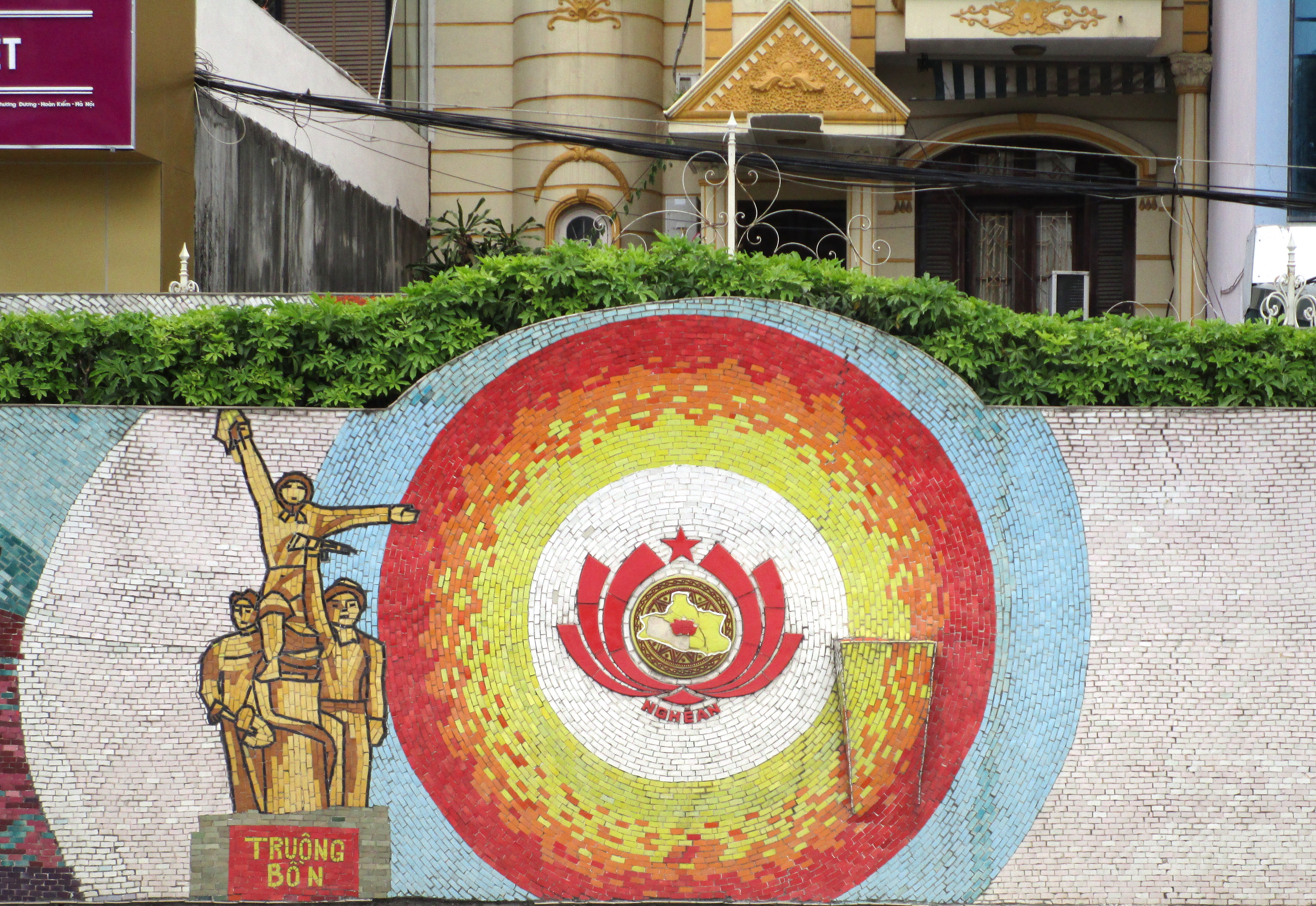

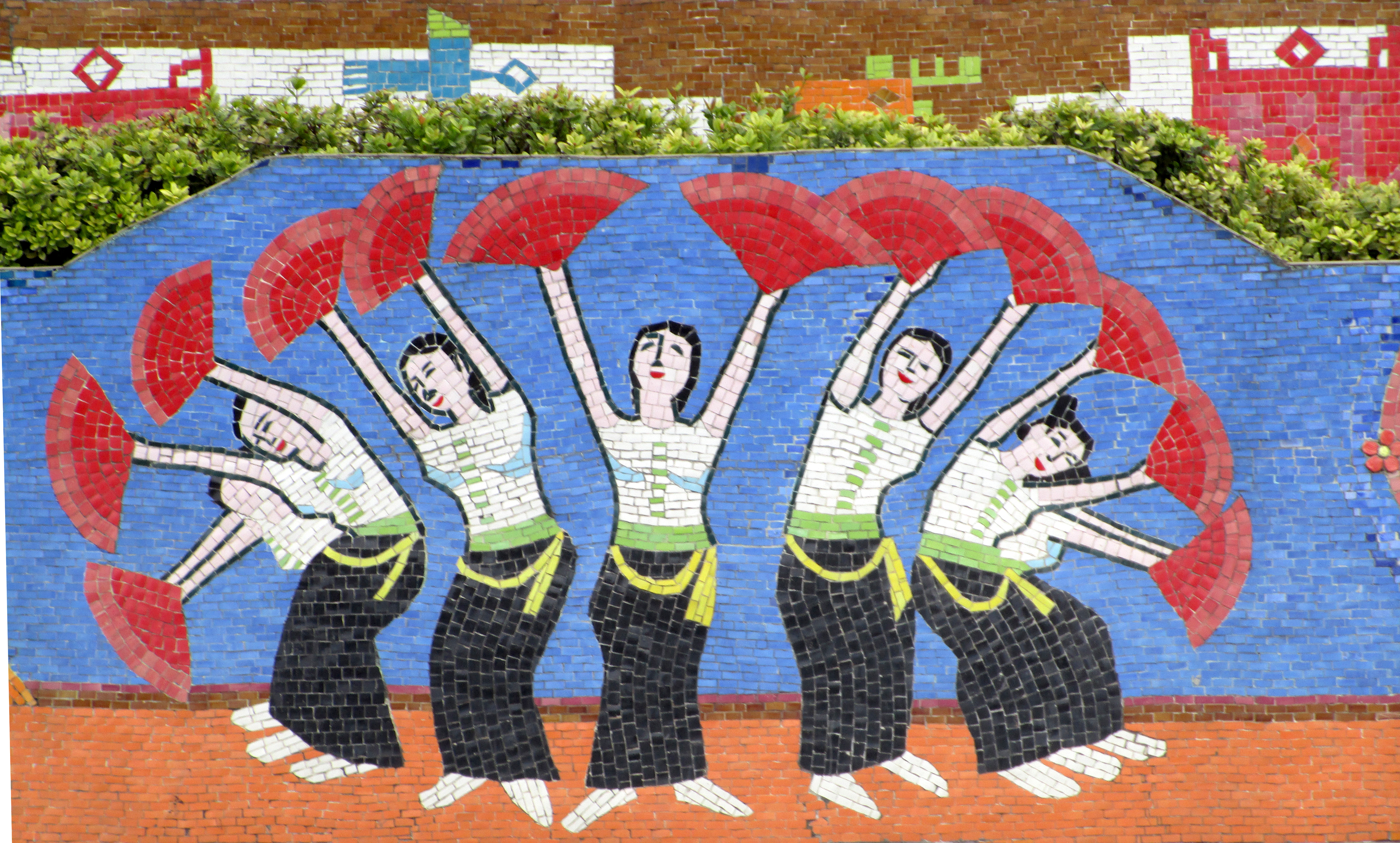

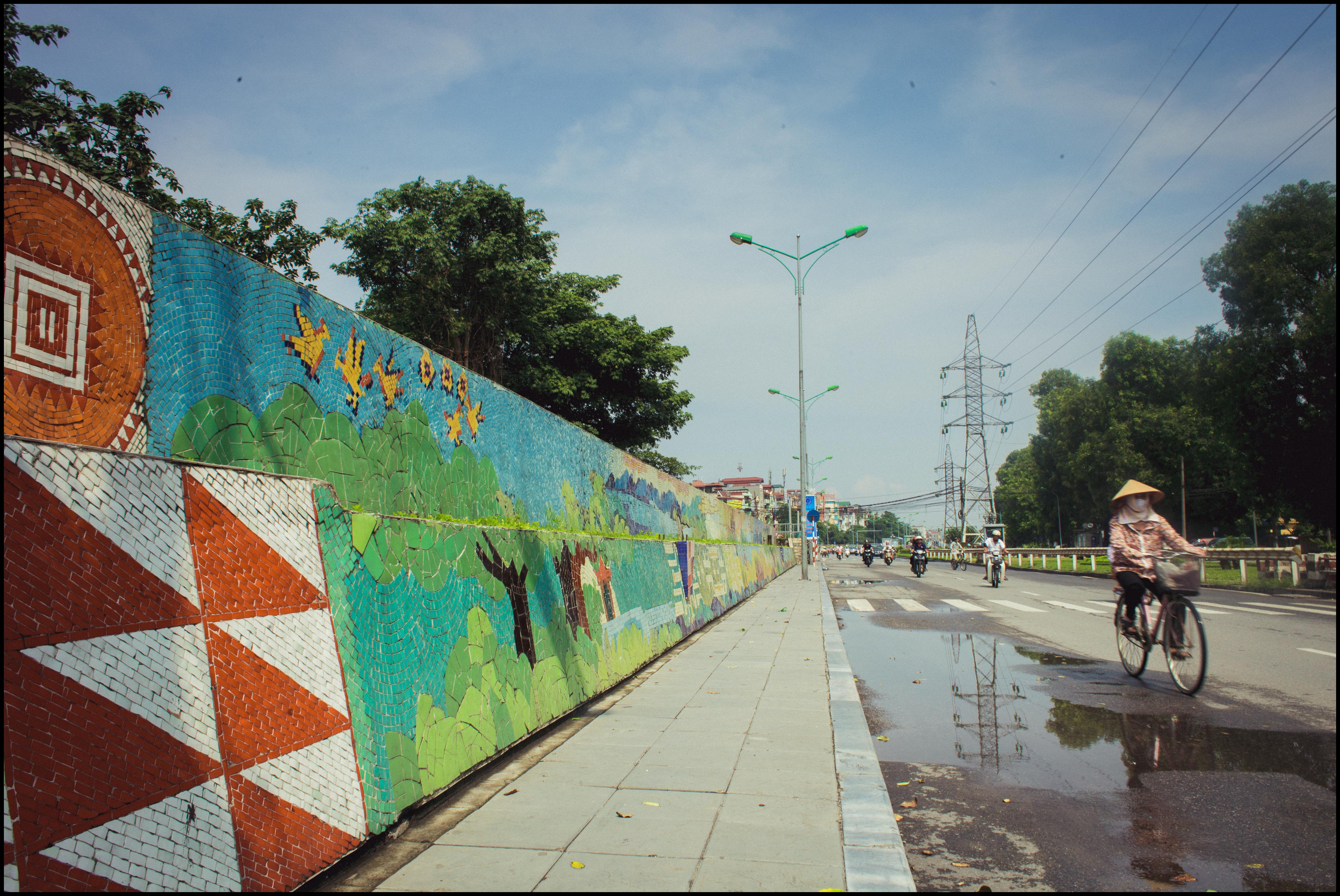

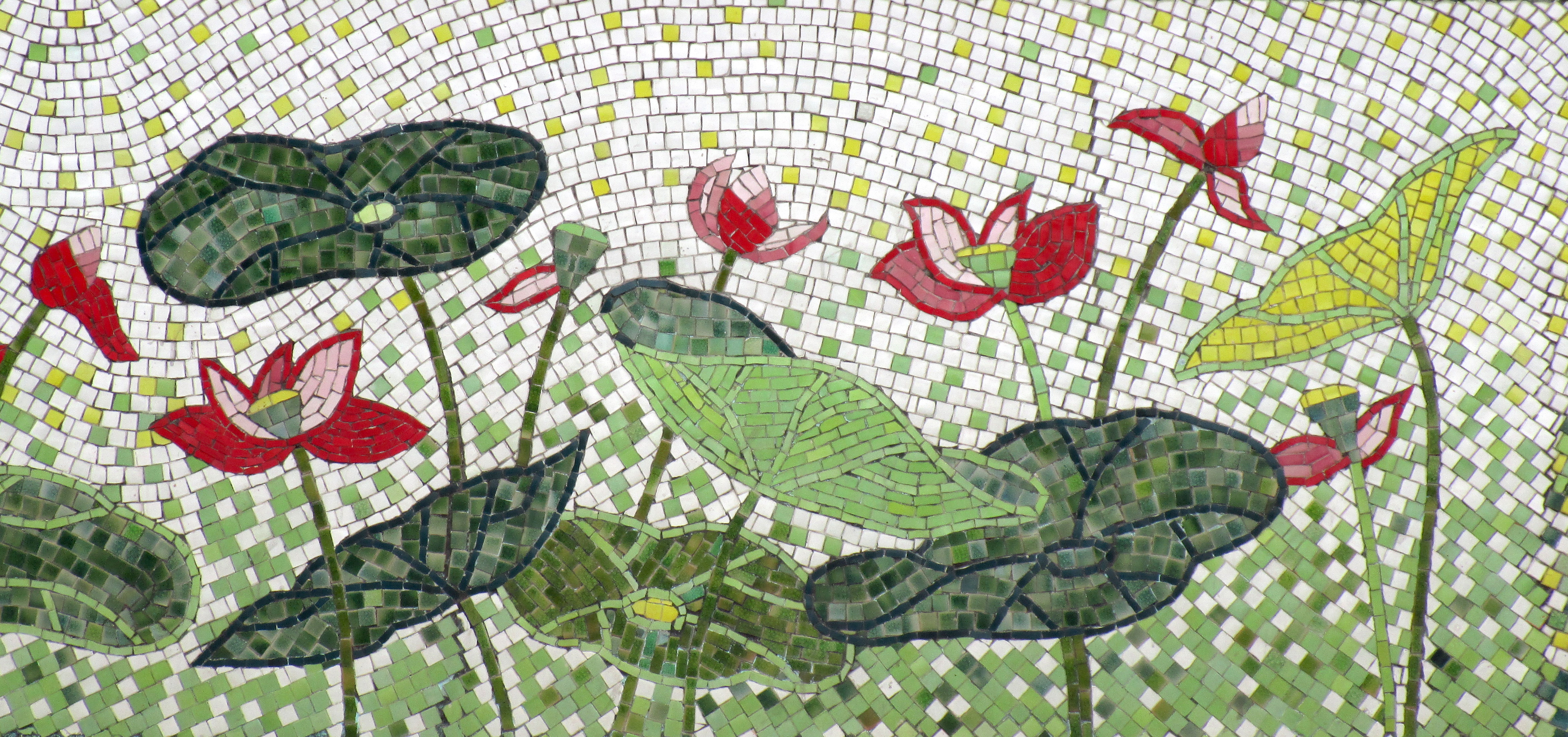

She was awarded the Bui Xuan Phai Prize in 2009 and the title of the Elite Hanoi Citizen in 2010.

== Other works ==
After completing the work of the Hanoi Ceramic Mosaic Mural, Nguyễn Thu Thủy continued to come up with the idea of making a huge ceramic flag in Spratly Island.

The mosaic flag's area is 303.8 m^{2} (3,270 sq ft) (14 m × 21.7 m [46 ft × 71 ft]) that can be seen from the sky (from Google Earth or aircraft).
