= Hanoi Museum =

Museum in Hanoi, Vietnam

Coordinates: 21°00′33″N 105°47′09″E

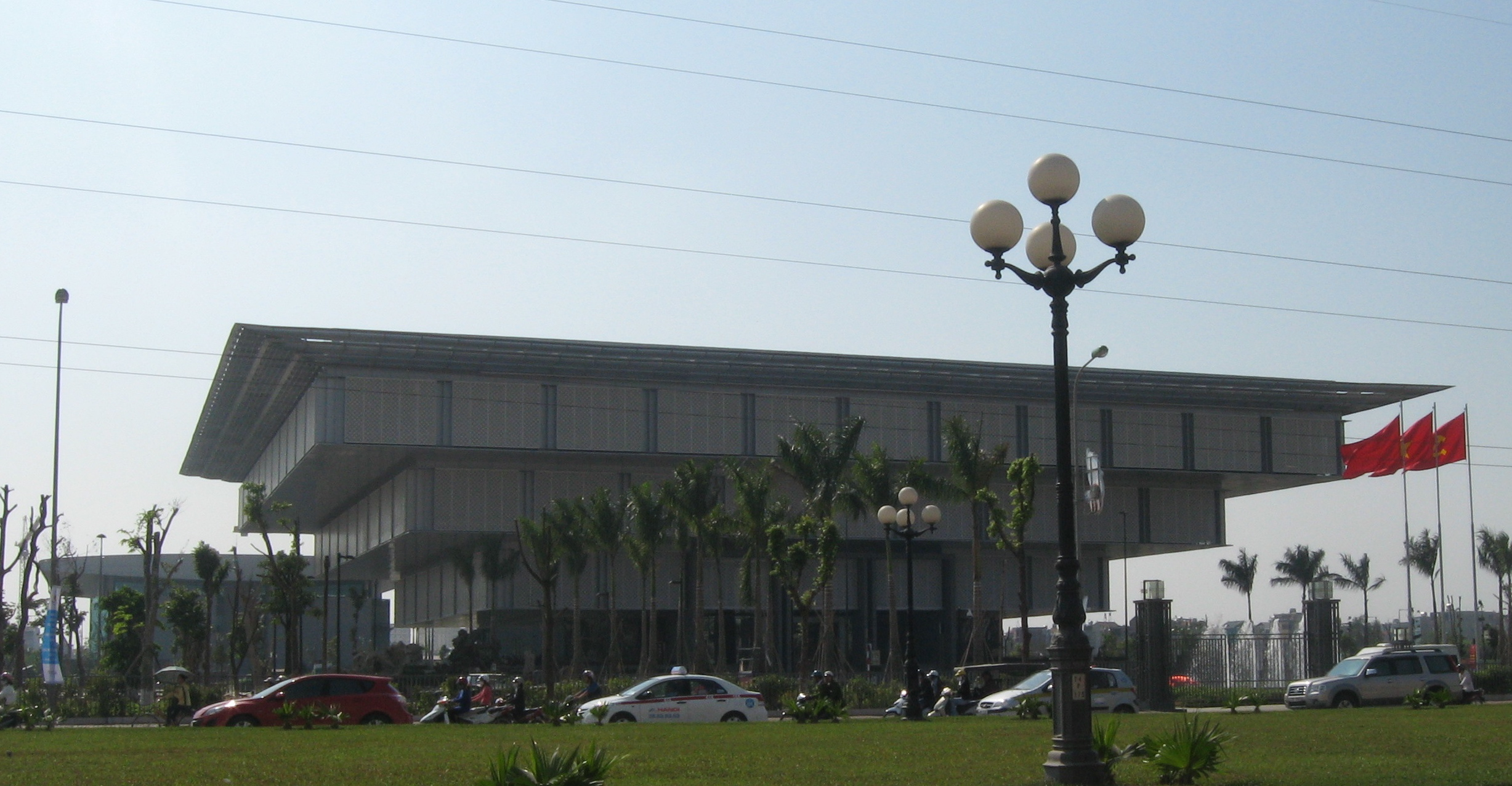
Hanoi Museum

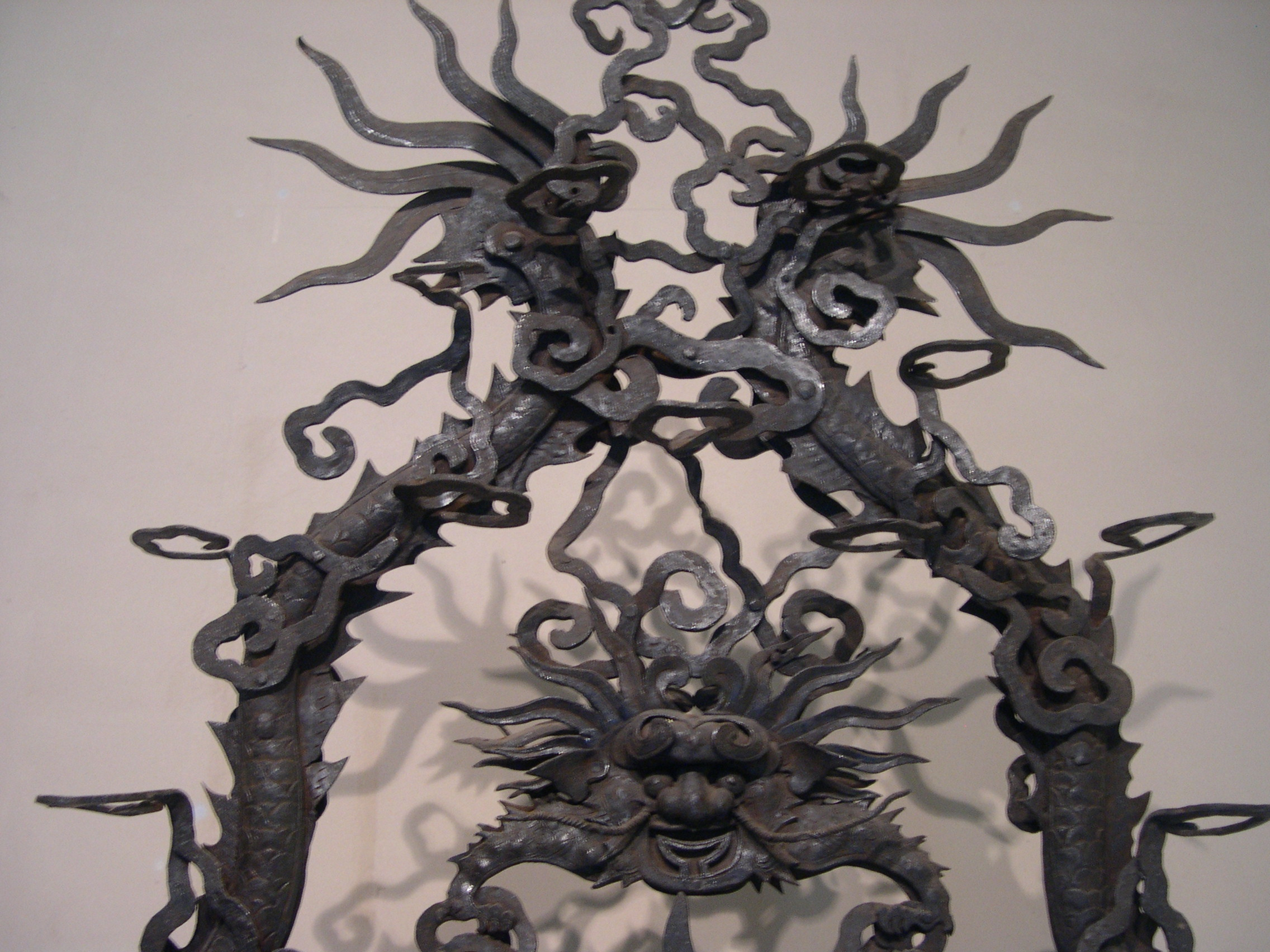
Metal sculpture, Hanoi Museum

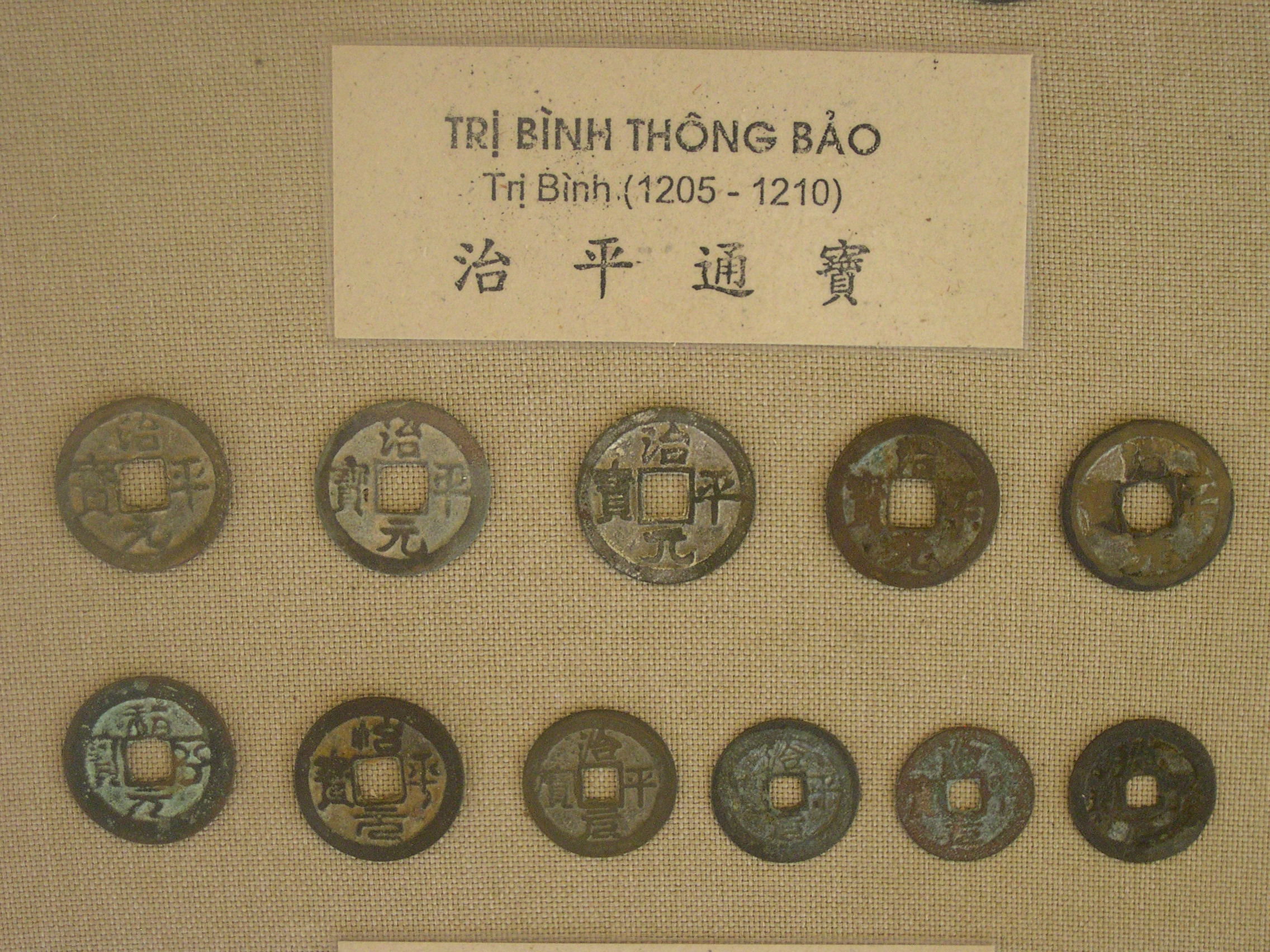
Old coins, Hanoi Museum

The Museum of Hanoi (Vietnamese: Bảo tàng Hà Nội) is located in Nam Từ Liêm district of Hanoi, Vietnam. The museum displays artifacts from Hanoi's 1000-year history and the history, culture, heritage, and architecture of Vietnam. It showcases over 50,000 artifacts in a total area of nearly 54,000 square meters.

The Hanoi museum was opened in 2010 for the Millennial Anniversary of Hanoi.

The exhibition building has an inverted pyramid shape.

== Displays ==
This repository houses a collection of over 50,000 artifacts, encompassing an area of nearly 54,000 square meters.
