= Millennial Anniversary of Hanoi =

Celebratation in Vietnam

Đại lễ 1000 năm Thăng Long – Hà Nội
- Logo of the anniversary
- Date: 1–10 October 2010
- Location: Hanoi
- Also known as: Millennial Anniversary of Hanoi
- Outcome: Successful

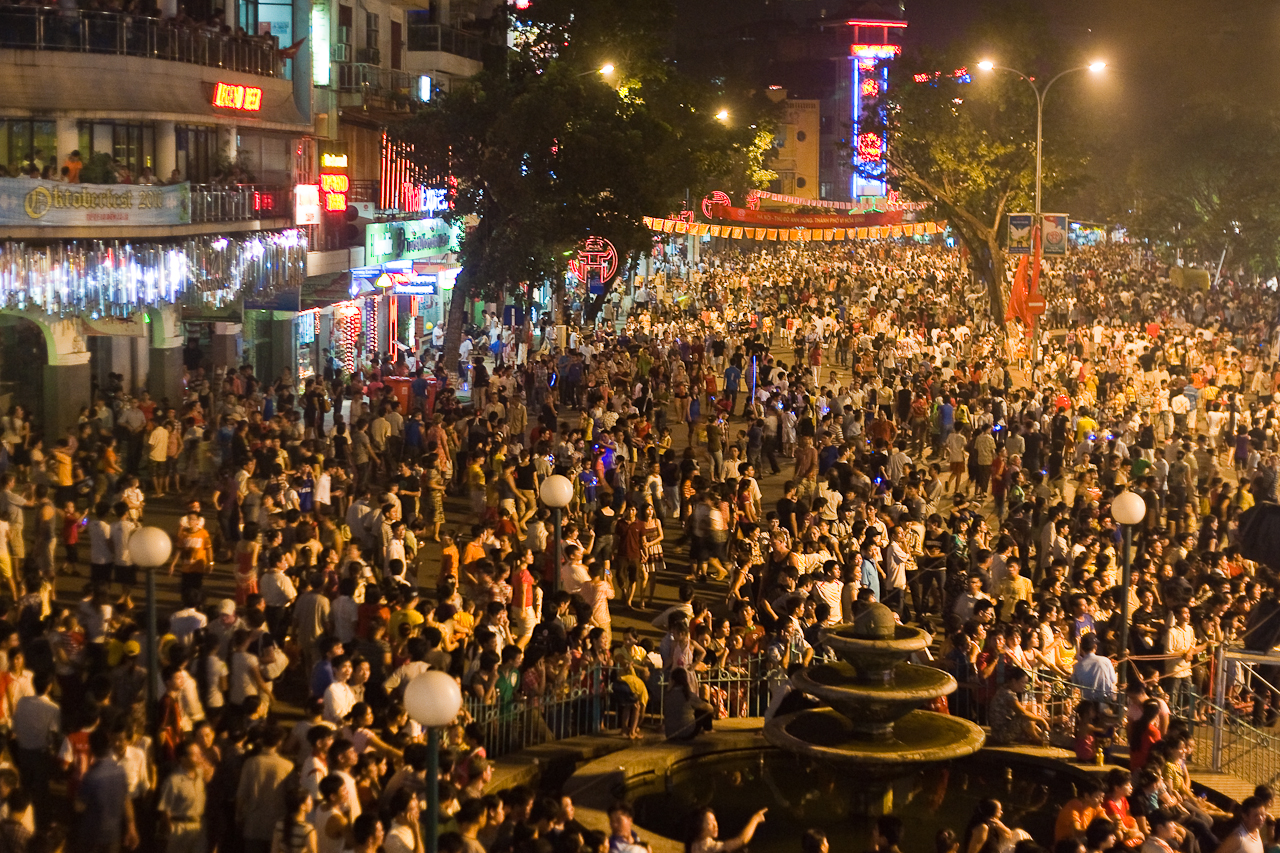
Anniversary celebration near Hoan Kiem lake

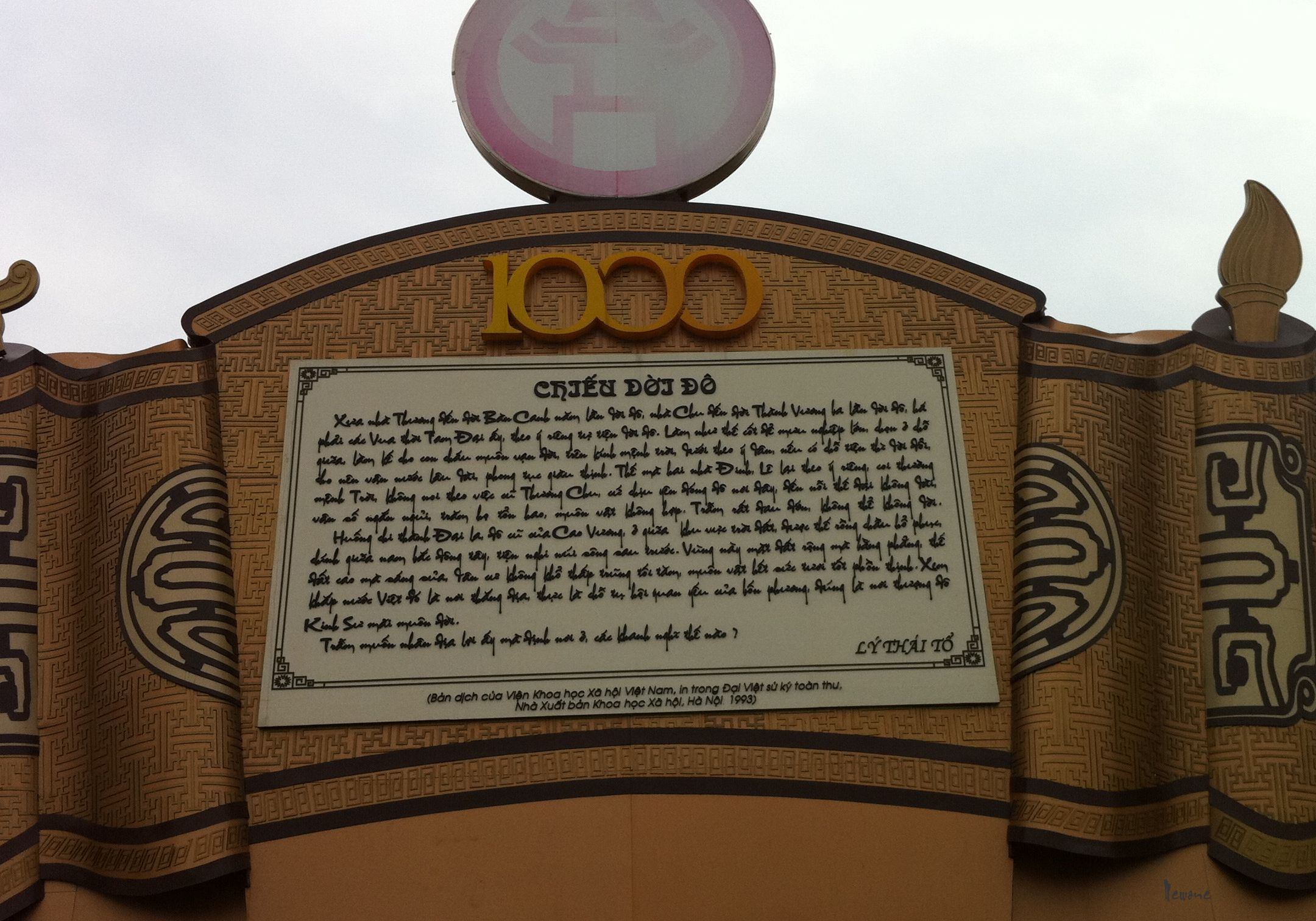
Millennial anniversary of Hanoi—translation of Vietnam Academy of Social Sciences

The Millennial Anniversary of Hanoi (Vietnamese: Đại lễ 1000 năm Thăng Long – Hà Nội) was celebrated from 1 to 10 October 2010, the 1,000th anniversary of the foundation of the capital Thăng Long by the emperor Lý Thái Tổ. Many events were held in 2009 and 2010 to commemorate the anniversary, including cultural and traditional festivals as well as inaugurations of major projects in Hanoi.

== Myth ==
According to the Đại Việt sử ký toàn thư, Lý Thái Tổ, the first emperor of the Lý dynasty, decided to move the capital of the country from Hoa Lư to Đại La in the seventh month of the lunar calendar, 1010. When the convoy of Lý Thái Tổ arrived in Đại La, a golden dragon rose beside the emperor's boat, hence Lý Thái Tổ changed the name of the new capital from Đại La to Thăng Long (昇 龍, literally "The Rising Dragon").

== Commemorative projects ==
Many major projects in the city of Hanoi were built as part of the millennial anniversary. Amongst them, several projects were inaugurated between the 1 and 10 October 2010:

Project	Vietnamese name	Area
Hanoi Museum	Bảo tàng Hà Nội	Phạm Hùng road, Từ Liêm district
Hòa Bình Park	Công viên Hòa Bình	Từ Liêm district
Workers' Theatre	Rạp Công nhân	Tràng Tiền street, Hoàn Kiếm district
Thanh Trì Bridge	Cầu Thanh Trì	Across the Red River
Vĩnh Tuy Bridge	Cầu Vĩnh Tuy	Across the Red River
Láng - Hòa Lạc Highway	Đường cao tốc Láng - Hòa Lạc	

In February 2010, a project was announced in which 1,000 objects would be buried with a message for future generations 1,000 years hence. They included 63 representative items for the 63 provinces of Vietnam and another 937 items from ordinary life, suggested by the people of Hanoi. All objects would be kept in a container of 1,000 liters that symbolizes 1,000 years of Thăng Long – Hanoi, and would be buried on the site of the Hanoi Museum.

== Events ==
The Millennial Anniversary of Hanoi was officially celebrated from 1 to 10 October 2010, with the great celebration (Đại lễ kỉ niệm) held on Sunday, 10 October, which is also the Liberation Day of Hanoi (1954). The ceremony is considered to be one of the most important events in Vietnam in the year 2010, after the official instruction No. 32-CT/TU of the Politburo of the Communist Party of Vietnam, to organize the event. A committee was established with members from the Politburo, the Government of Vietnam, and the City of Hanoi. The main purpose of the ceremony was to express gratefulness to generations of Vietnamese in the past who contributed to the defence and development of the country, and passing this tradition on to future generations. Exactly 1,000 days before the official ceremony, a countdown clock 17 meters high and 8 meters wide was inaugurated at the Bà Kiệu Temple, in front of Hoan Kiem Lake, on 13 January 2008.

The 2010 Millennial Anniversary of Hanoi Football Championship was held from 20 to 24 September.

=== Surrounding events ===
Commemorative events were organized not only in Hanoi but also in other provinces, from Phú Thọ to Huế and Ho Chi Minh City. For example, in Bắc Ninh, the native land of Lý Thái Tổ, an incense-offering ceremony at the Lý Bát Đế Shrine and other festivals were held during the ten days from 1 to 10 October 2010, while Ho Chi Minh City organized its own festival, named "Thang Long – Hanoi: 1000 Years of History".

=== Main events ===
On 10 June 2009, Prime Minister Nguyễn Tấn Dũng issued a decision approving the detailed scheme of the Millennial Anniversary of Hanoi as following:

Day	At a glance
1 October (Opening Day)	Opening ceremony at the Lý Thái Tổ statue near Hoàn Kiếm Lake.; Exhibition of economic and social achievements of Vietnam and Hanoi at the Giảng Võ Exhibition Centre; other exhibitions and cultural performances.
2–9 October	Film festival about Hanoi; art show at the Hanoi Opera House; street festivals.; Final matches of the Thăng Long – Hanoi Football Cup; Marathon of the Hà Nội Mới newspaper; cycling tournament from Ho Chi Minh City to Hanoi.; Tourism Festival of Hanoi; Festival for Craft Villages of Hanoi; various other exhibitions and festivals.; Awards ceremony "Hanoi – Your Rendezvous", an international competition on knowledge about Thăng Long – Hanoi.
10 October	Great Ceremony of the Millennial Anniversary

=== Fireworks at My Dinh National Stadium ===
Following the cancellation of celebratory fireworks in 29 locations around the country due to flooding in Central Vietnam, at 9:00 pm, 10 October 2010, a fireworks show began in Mỹ Đình National Stadium.

== See also ==
- Hanoi Ceramic Mosaic Mural
- Imperial Citadel of Thang Long
