= Bát Tràng porcelain =

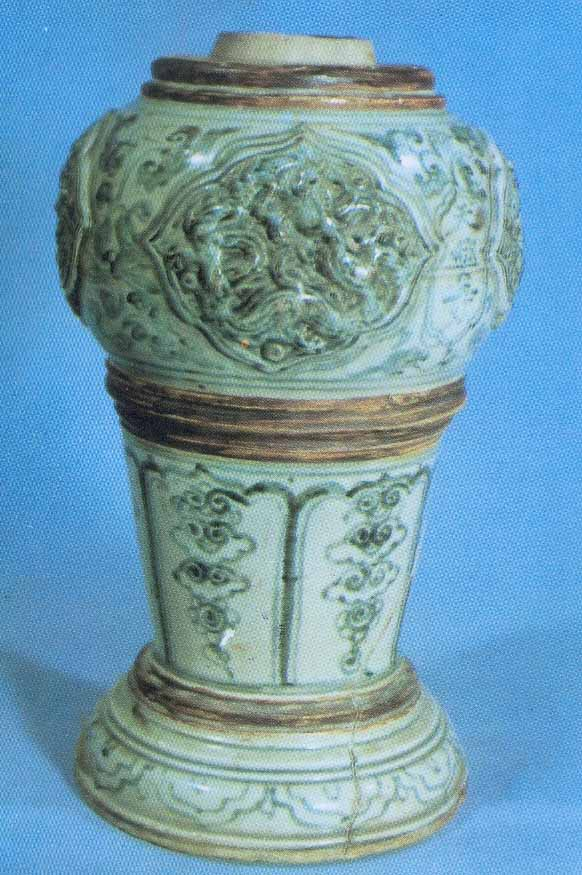
A lamp support of Bat Trang Porcelain. Photo taken in the Museum of Art of Vietnam in Hanoi

Bát Tràng porcelain and pottery is a type of ceramic made in the village of Bát Tràng, on the outskirts of Hanoi, Vietnam. The village is located in an area rich in clay suitable for making ceramic. Bát Tràng ceramics are considered some of the best known porcelain products in Vietnam besides those of Chu Đậu, Biên Hòa, Phù Lãng, Hương Canh, Lái Thiêu and Bầu Trúc. The history of ceramic-making in this village can be traced back to the 14th century AD during the Ly-Tran dynasty period.

== History ==
Bat Trang has become a popular tourist destination, attracting domestic and foreign tourists to visit, shop and experience pottery making. On December 20, 2019, the Ministry of Culture, Sports and Tourism of Vietnam announced that Bat Trang pottery village is a national intangible cultural heritage. So far, Bat Trang has had more than 200 enterprises and more than 1,000 households producing and trading a variety of goods, both in terms of type and design.

== See also ==
- Bát Tràng Pottery Museum
