= Ringway 3 (Hanoi) =

Road in Hanoi, Vietnam

CT.37 Expressway
- Ringway 3 Expressway (Hanoi)
- Đường cao tốc Vành đai 3 TP.Hà Nội
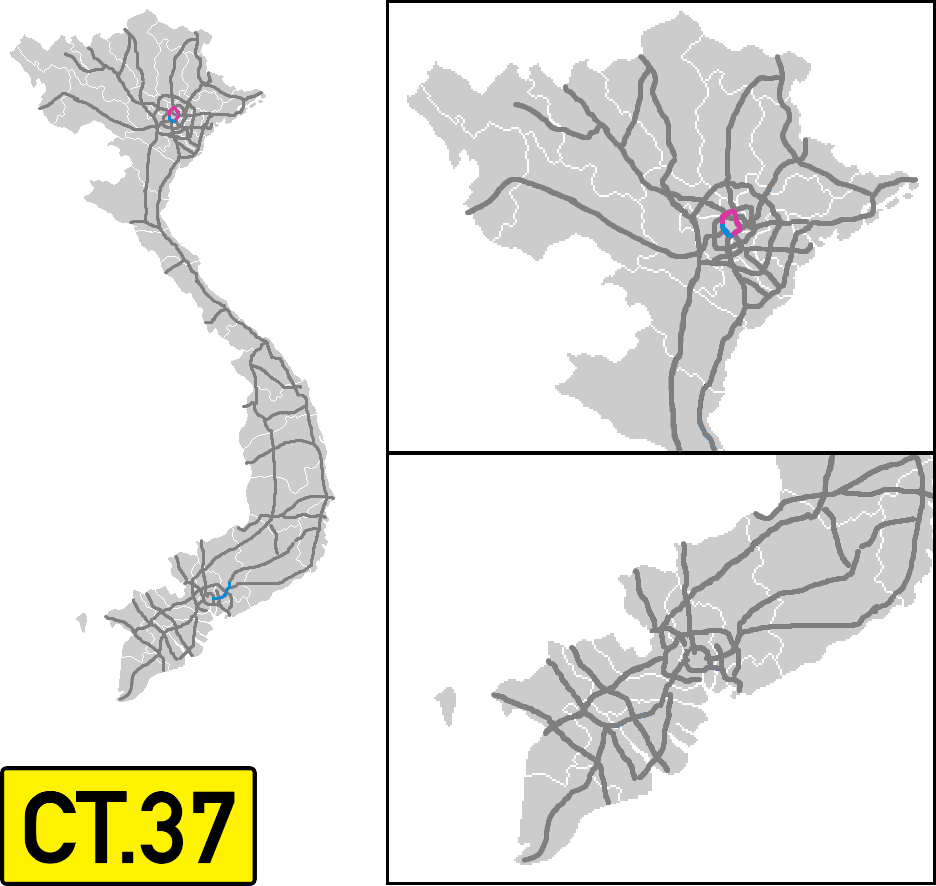
- Map of the CT.37 expressway with operational (blue) and under construction (pink) sections

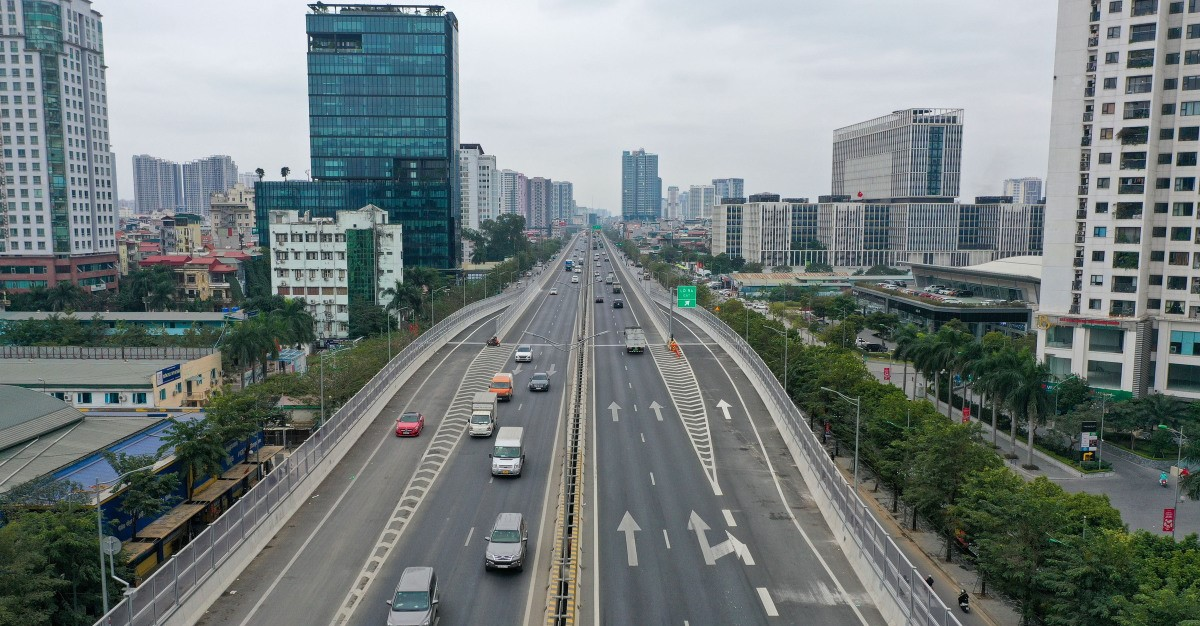
- Elevated Ringway 3, near Mai Dịch junction, Cầu Giấy, Hanoi.

Route information
- Part of AH1
- Maintained by Hanoi Department of Transportation (HNDoT)
- Length: 65 km (40 mi)
- Status: Fully Completed (Thăng Long Bridge - Phù Đổng Bridge)
- Existed: 20 June 1998–present
- Component highways: (Pháp Vân IC - Phù Đổng Bridge)

Major junctions
- West end: Thăng Long Bridge
- at Mai Dịch, Cầu Giấy District, Hanoi; near Trung Hòa Interchange, Cầu Giấy, Hanoi: , AH13 near Thanh Xuân Interchange, Thanh Xuân District, Hanoi; ,, AH1 at Pháp Vân Interchange, Hoàng Mai District, Hanoi; , AH1 at Cổ Linh Interchange, near Thanh Trì Bridge, Long Biên, Hanoi; ,,, AH1, AH14 at Long Biên District, Hanoi

Location
- Country: Vietnam
- Major cities: Hanoi

Highway system
- Transport in Vietnam
← CT.36	→ CT.38

The Ringway 3 of Greater Hanoi area (Vietnamese: Đường Vành đai 3 Hà Nội), signed as CT.37 is a major freeway and urban thoroughfare surrounding the inner part of Hanoi. As the first ringway built in Greater Hanoi area, Ringway 3 connects most of the newly developed area outside the urban core of Hanoi. In addition to that, Ringway 3 is the terminus of most expressway connecting Greater Hanoi to other regions of Vietnam. Due to its importance, Ringway 3 is one of the busiest and most congested highway in Vietnam, carrying from 8 to 10 times its maximum capacity. To deal with congestion, the Government of Vietnam has proposed building additional ringway to help alleviate traffic on Ringway 3.

== Names and signage ==
There is no official, single name for this road in English. In Vietnamese, this road is referred in official documents and the media as Vành đai 3 (lit. Third Ring Road). Some other sources translate this road as Ring Road 3 (like JICA). This article uses the translated title "Ringway 3", adopted from the London Ringways scheme of the 1960s.

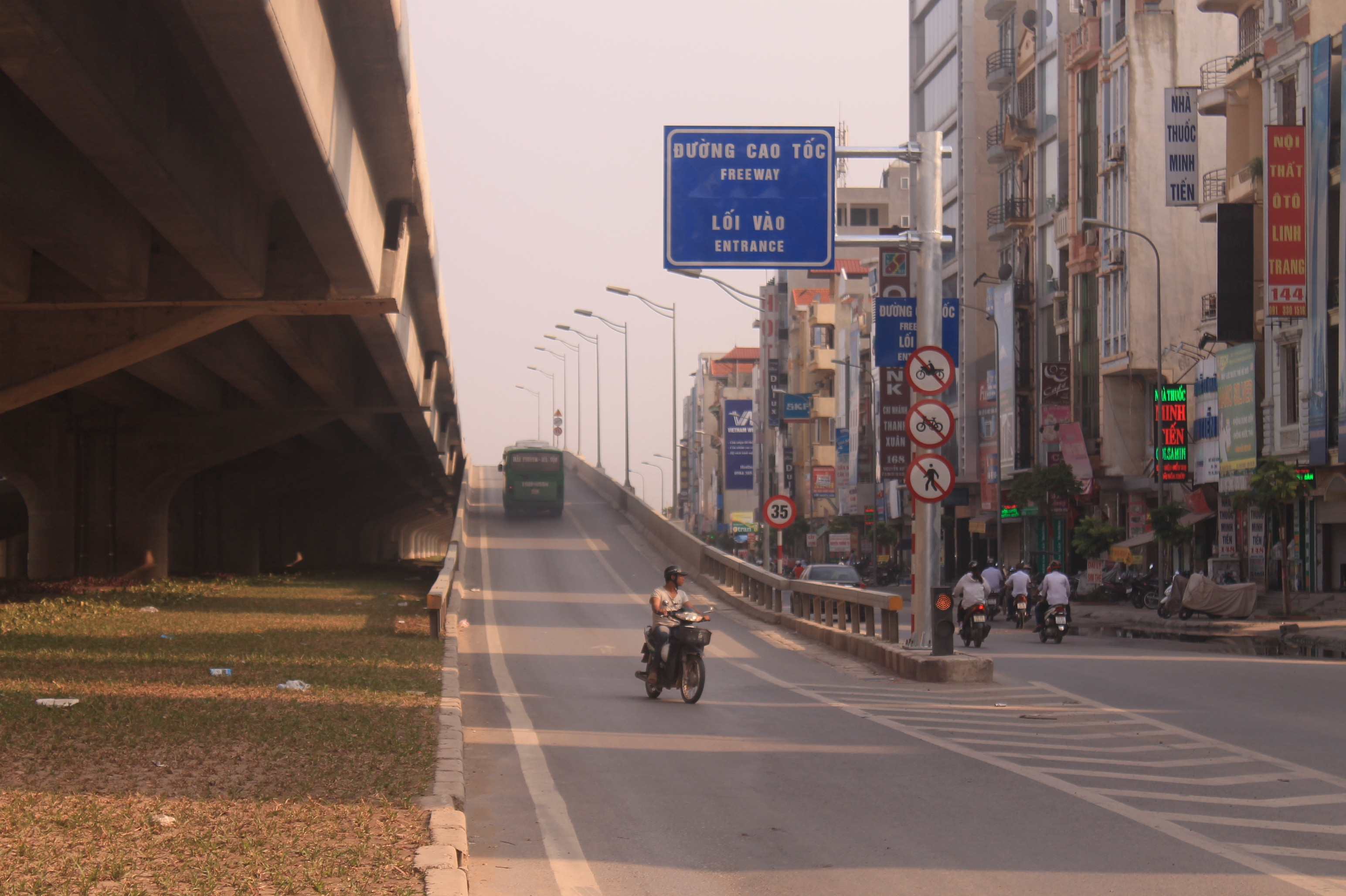
Direction sign at Thanh Xuân junction shows Ringway 3 as a "freeway". This is 1 of the only 8 signs in the entirety of Vietnam that use the term "freeway"

Regarding signage and numbering, the elevated freeway portion officially carries the designation CT.37 (with CT is Vietnamese for "cao tốc", lit. expressway) since September 2021. Previously, this portion carried the designation CT.20. As of October 2022, nearly all signs on the freeway still use the old designation. Another signage problem is the disagreements whether the elevated portion is a "freeway" or an "expressway". Most signs on the elevated segment use "expressway"; while directional signs at Thanh Xuân and Trung Hòa junction use "freeway".

== Route description ==
=== East of the Red River (Long Biên and Gia Lâm district) ===
The current segment of Ringway 3 begins at the interchange with Thái Nguyên expressway near Từ Sơn, Bắc Ninh. Ringway 3 then continues south, traverses the Phù Đổng Bridge through the Đuống River. It then intersects National Highway 5, an important road connecting Hanoi with Hải Phòng and its ports.

Continuing pass the Highway 5 toward Thanh Trì Bridge, Ringway 3 pass through 2 major junctions: The first one is with Hải Phòng expressway, built to relieve traffic on the heavily congested Highway 5; and Cổ Linh Avenue to Vĩnh Tuy Bridge, which serve as an alternative route to get to central Hanoi. The second junction is located about one kilometre (0.62 mi) south of the first junction, providing access to newly developed area of Ocean Park, Ecopark, as well as access to Bát Tràng Village.

Ringway 3 then continues southward toward central Hanoi as Thanh Trì Bridge, crossing the Red River.

=== Thanh Trì Bridge ===
The Thanh Trì bridge is major bridge spanning Red River, connecting the eastern districts of Long Biên and Gia Lâm, and the western districts of Hoàng Mai. It carries both Ringway 3, Bắc Ninh Expressway (part of north–south expressway) and National Highway 1A.

The bridge has eight lanes: four for each direction, with three left lanes reserved for motorized traffic. Since motorbikes are not allowed on expressway, the outer right lane is reserved for motorbikes only. While designed for a maximum speed of 100 km/h (62 mph), the speed limit was lowered to 60 km/h (37 mph) due to heavy traffic and high frequency of accidents.

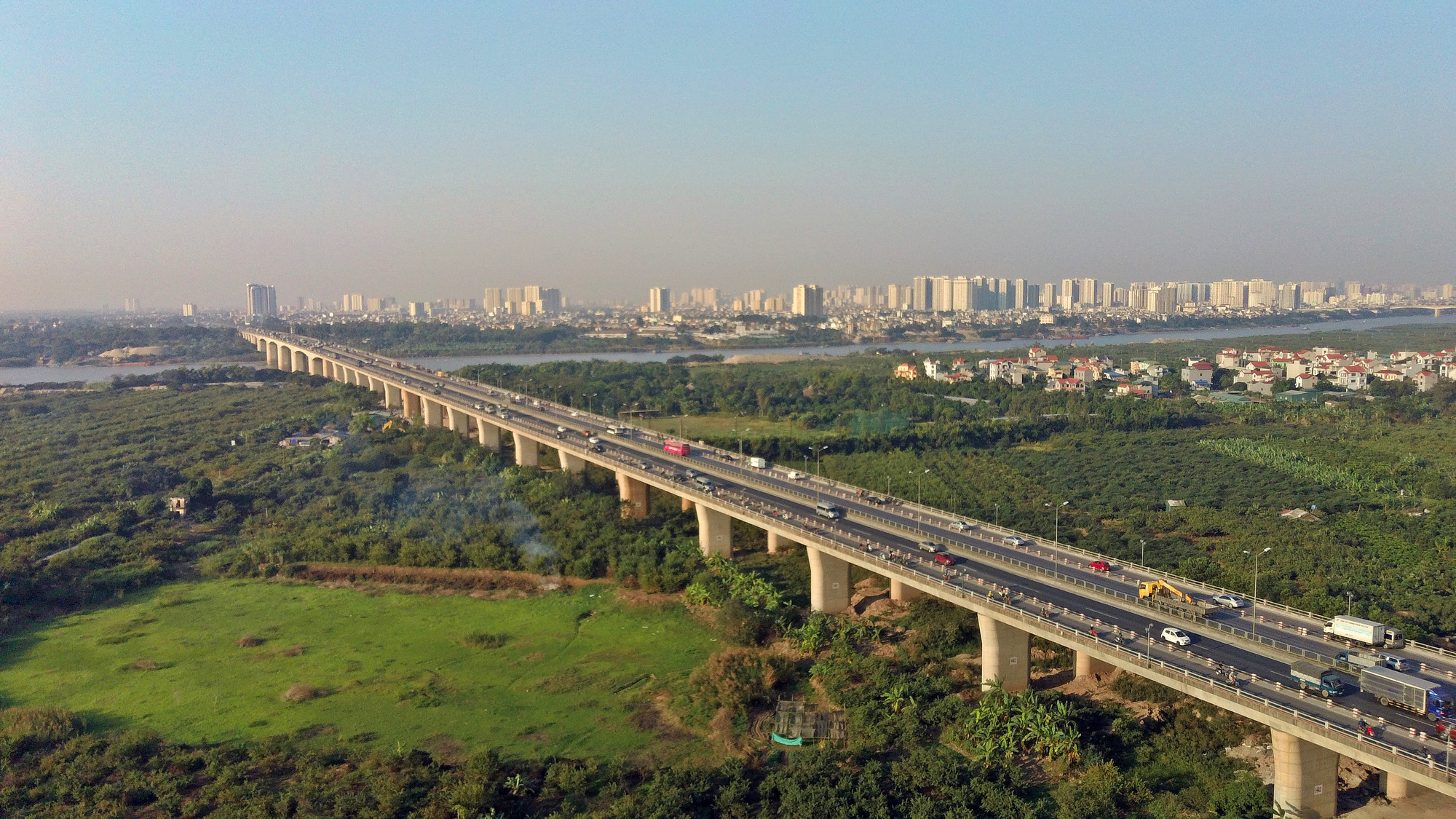
Thanh Trì bridge heading toward central Hanoi, on a day with heavy traffic.

As the final Red River crossing in the greater Hanoi area (the next crossing being Yên Lệnh Bridge, 60 km (37 mi) away), combined with this bridge is one of the only connections from Hanoi to northeast provinces (Thái Nguyên, Bắc Giang, Lạng Sơn, and the Chinese border), as well as to the city of Hải Phòng and its ports, and the heavily visited city of Hạ Long, this bridge suffers from very heavy traffic and frequent accidents. According to data from Hanoi's Department of Transportation (HNDoT), as of October 2022, the bridge currently carries 124,000 vehicles per day, around 5.5 times its designed capacity.

=== Central Hanoi ===
After traversing the Red River, Ringway 3 splits into two portion: An elevated portion, which is designed to freeway/Interstate Highway standard, designed to handle traffic between expressways; and an at-grade portion, which served as a major arterial road, connecting heavily populated area of Hoàng Mai, Thanh Xuân, Cầu Giấy and North Từ Liêm districts.

==== Elevated portion ====
===== Extension of Thanh Trì bridge =====
The elevated portion started after crossing Thanh Trì Bridge, with the first part being an extension of Thanh Trì bridge to Highway 1. Designed as a freeway, it has four lanes with two for each direction, and a hard shoulder for safety. The maximum speed limit is 80 km/h (50 mph), and there are two exits: One to Lĩnh Nam Rd, which serves the local communities of Lĩnh Nam and Vĩnh Hưng, and the other is to Tam Trinh Rd, an alternate route to central Hanoi.

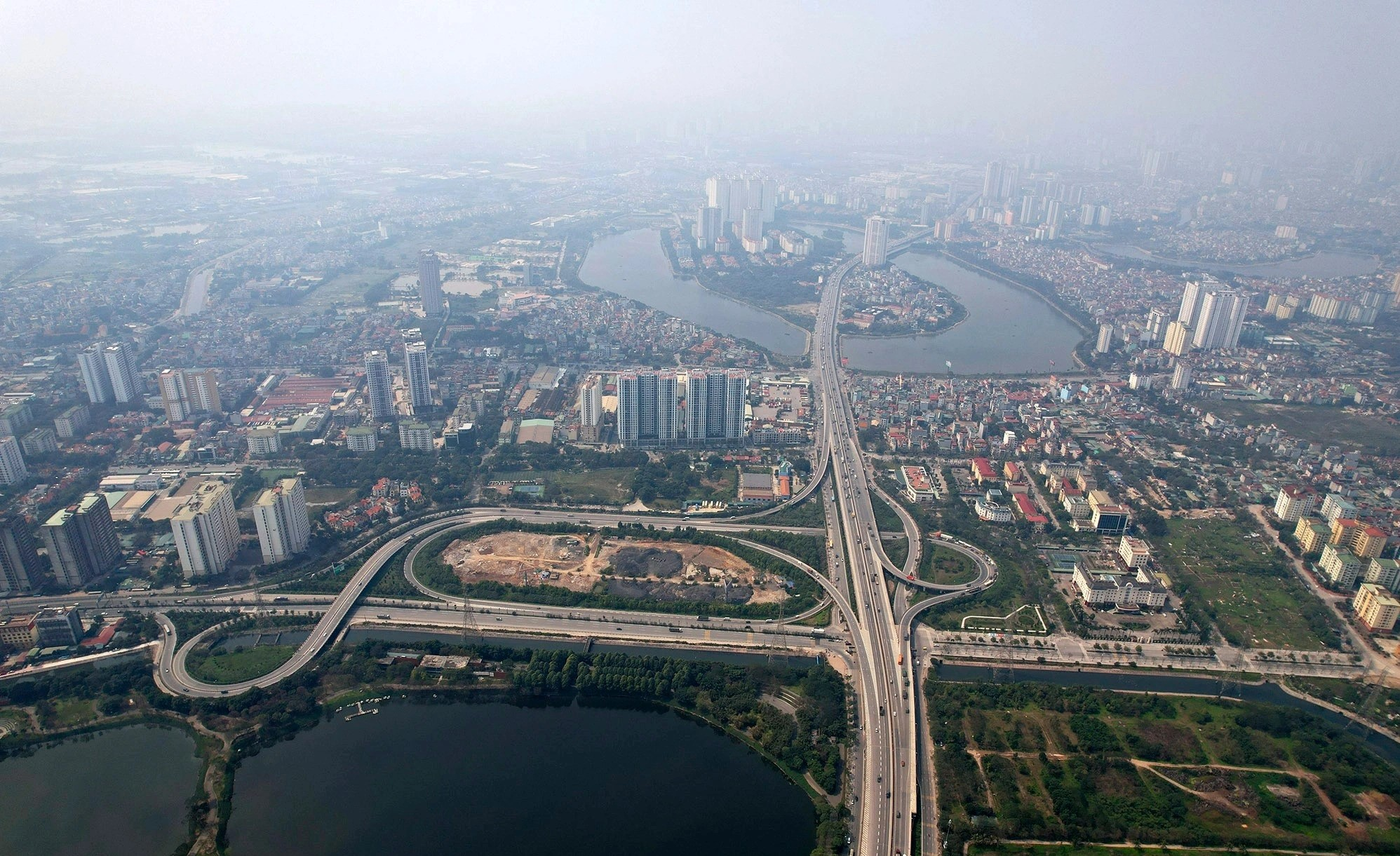
Ringway 3 (center) near Pháp Vân interchange with North–south expressway (left)

This portion terminates at Pháp Vân interchange, a major interchange located near the neighborhood of Pháp Vân, Hoàng Mai district. From here, Highway 1A and the CT.01 highway split from Ringway 3, heading southward to southern Red River Delta provinces and Central provinces as Pháp Vân expressway. Ringway 3 continues as Pháp Vân viaduct and Elevated Ringway 3.

===== Pháp Vân - Mai Dịch segment =====
Continuing northbound, Ringway 3 crosses through Giải Phóng and Ngọc Hồi Blvd - a major thoroughfare connecting downtown Hanoi and southern suburbs; and Linh Đàm lake, located near Linh Đàm, a heavily populated neighborhood of southern Hanoi. It then continues northbound, running through newly developed area of Manor Park and Khương Đình before heading to Thanh Xuân junction.

The Thanh Xuân junction is diamond interchange, with its ramps connecting directly to at-grade Ringway 3. This junction provides connection to Nguyễn Trãi Blvd (part of National Highway 6), an arterial road connects downtown Hanoi (Ba Đình Square) to western, newly developed districts of Thanh Xuân and Hà Đông.

Heading north, Ringway 3 then reaches the junction with Hòa Lạc Expressway (Thăng Long Blvd) heading west to Hòa Lạc and Hòa Bình; and Trần Duy Hưng Blvd (named after Dr. Trần Duy Hưng, the first mayor of Hanoi), heading east to downtown Hanoi. The segment between two junctions are frequently congested, due to the close proximity of the two (about 1 km (0.62 mi), less than the recommended distance of 3 to 5 km (1.9 to 3.1 mi) between exits).

Ringway 3 then continues to make its way to Mai Dịch junction, when the first elevated segment ends. Traffic can continue north through Mai Dịch overpass (and eventually the second elevated segment), or use the at-grade intersection with Highway 32, connecting northwestern suburb of Nhổn and Mỹ Đình to the central Hanoi.

===== Mai Dịch - Thăng Long Bridge segment =====
Beyond Mai Dịch junction, elevated Ringway 3 continues making its way north toward Thăng Long Bridge as a 4 lane freeway, similar to previous segments. Compared to other elevated segments, traffic on this segment is relatively light. As a result, the speed limit is higher at 100 km/h (60 mph). Running above Phạm Văn Đông Blvd, this segments has 3 exits: One to Hoàng Quốc Việt Blvd, connecting to Ringway 2 and Nhật Tân Bridge; another to Cổ Nhuế; and the last one is to Ciputra and Embassy Area (Ngoại giao Đoàn), two of the more affluent area of Hanoi.

This is the newest segment of the entire Ringway 3, having been completed in October 2020, and connecting ramps in December 2021.

Ringway 3 then continues northbound as Thăng Long bridge, heading to North Thăng Long Industrial Park, Nội Bài Int'l Airport, and northwestern provinces of Vĩnh Phúc and Phú Thọ.

==== At-grade portion ====
===== From Thanh Trì bridge to Linh Đàm =====
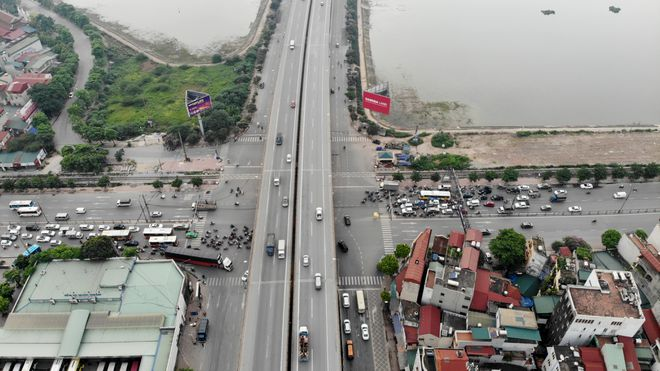
Old Pháp Vân interchange, where Ringway 3 (both at-grade and elevated) meets old segment of Highway 1. This junction is alternatively called "Ngã 4 bến xe Nước Ngầm", since it is located next to Nước Ngầm coach station (lit. Groundwater coach station, named after its investor, the Ground Water company of Hanoi)

Exiting Thanh Trì bridge, the at-grade portion runs underneath the elevated portion. Before the construction of Thanh Trì bridge, this section was a 2 lane road connecting Highway 1 to Red River levee. It is now a four-lane arterial road, with two lanes and a shoulder for each direction. This road serves as collector road to nearby community of Tam Trinh, Lĩnh Nam; as well as providing direct access to old Highway 1 (since the elevated portion only connect to Pháp Vân expressway). In addition, this segment also serves as an alternative route for the often congested elevated segment.

Beyond Pháp Vân junction, the road is named Hoàng Liệt Avenue, since it serves the village of Hoàng Liệt, as well as the eastern half of the neighborhood of Linh Đàm. After a couple of junctions with local streets, the road turn into an overpass, spanning Linh Đàm lake, before it meets Nguyễn Hữu Thọ Ave., a major thoroughfare connecting the entire neighborhood of Linh Đàm to downtown Hanoi.

From Nguyễn Hữu Thọ Ave. to Kim Giang Rd., this road serves as a connector road for traffic entering western half of Linh Đàm, as well as nearby community of Thanh Liệt and Đại Kim.

===== Linh Đàm to Thanh Xuân junction =====
Heading north out of Linh Đàm, the road is now eight lanes wide, with four lanes for each direction, and is signed as Nghiêm Xuân Yêm Boulevard. (named after the Minister of Agriculture and Rural Development from 1947 to 1971). Newly developed area of Kim Văn - Kim Lũ and Manor Central Park are built along this portion. Compared to other segments, this portion hasn't been developed fully. Around halfway to Thanh Xuân junction, this road intersects Chu Văn An Blvd, connecting to densely populated neighborhood of Xa La in Hà Đông.

Past Chu Văn An Blvd, the road continues north as Nguyễn Xiển Boulevard (named for his contribution is development of science in early days of Vietnam). This section sees more development along its way, passing through neighborhood of Hạ Đình, Thanh Xuân. As this road approach Thanh Xuân junction, it got narrowed into two lanes each direction for the ramps to Ringway 3. This bottleneck often causes severe congestion, especially in rush hour.

===== Thanh Xuân junction to Trung Hòa junction =====
Ringway 3 meets Highway 6 (Nguyễn Trãi Blvd) at Thanh Xuân junction. A major junction of Hanoi, connecting east - west traffic between downtown Hà Nội and western districts of Thanh Xuân and Hà Đông, and north–south traffic around Ringway 3 corridor, this junction suffers serious traffic congestion. Many blame the poor design of the freeway, with ramps connecting in a diamond-like interchange, creating conflict points across the junction. To alleviate the problem, an underpass on Nguyễn Trãi Blvd was built to reduce congestion.

Past Thanh Xuân junction, this road is signed as Khuất Duy Tiến Boulevard. Originally built as local streets connecting brick factories and apartments complex for workers, it is now an 8-lane boulevard, with four lanes each direction. This road provides connection to Trung Hòa - Nhân Chính, a heavily developed area of Thanh Xuân district. This road intersects with Lê Văn Lương Ave. and Tố Hữu Ave., the second east - west corridor connecting downtown Hanoi and Hà Đông.

About 2 km northbound, Ringway 3 has another major intersection, this time with Trần Duy Hưng Blvd. and Hòa Lạc expressway. Similar to the junction with Nguyễn Trãi Blvd, this features a diamond-style interchange and an underpass for traffic heading east–west between Hòa Lạc expressway and Trần Duy Hưng Blvd. This junction often experiences severe congestion, since there is no direct ramp connecting elevated Ringway 3 with Hòa Lạc expressway, forcing many vehicles (the majority are trucks and other heavy good vehicles) to exit onto the junction below, causing delays and accidents, sometime fatal ones.

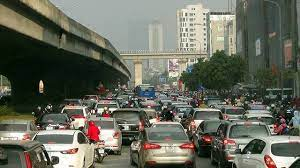
Nguyễn Xiển Blvd heading north on heavy traffic. This is a frequent scene on most of Ringway 3 on rush hour.

===== Trung Hòa junction to Mai Dịch junction =====
Continuing northbound as Phạm Hùng Boulevard, Ringway 3 pass through some of the first developed area of western Hanoi in the mid-2000s, including National Convention Center, Nam Trung Yên and Mỹ Đình. A notable landmark along this route is the Landmark Hanoi Towers, the tallest building in Hanoi and second-tallest building in Vietnam (after Landmark 81 building in HCMC).

Near Mai Dịch junction is one of Hanoi's major long-distance bus stations, Mỹ Đình bus station. Opened together with this segment in 2004, this serves as a major hub for local buses in western districts of Hanoi, and long-distance buses to northwestern provinces of Vietnam. Due to its importance, Mỹ Đình bus station is one of the main source of traffic on Phạm Hùng Blvd (other than motorbikes heading north which couldn't use the elevated freeway).

At the end of Phạm Hùng Blvd is the Mai Dịch junction, which connects traffic using Ringway 3 (both elevated and at-grade portions) to Highway 32, linking central Hanoi, major universities (including most of the National University's campuses) and northwestern outskirt towns of Hoài Đức and Sơn Tây. There is an overpass connecting this segment to Phạm Văn Đồng Blvd for traffic wishing to avoid traffic lights below, which also serves as a connector between two elevated freeway segments of Ringway 3.

===== Mai Dịch junction to Thăng Long bridge =====
The entire portion of at-grade Ringway 3 is signed as Phạm Văn Đồng Blvd. This is the most recently completed segment of Ringway 3, with the at-grade portion widening completed in 2019. Originally a 4-lane road, it has been widening to 8 lanes, accommodating traffic to nearby communities of Cổ Nhuế and Xuân Đỉnh, both have been existing long before any official planning.

This road pass through some notable landmark, including the Peace Park (Công viên Hòa Bình), built to honor Hanoi as "a city of peace" by UNESCO in 1999.

Near the end of this segment is the Ciputra junction, which provides access to affluent areas of Ciputra Hanoi International City and Embassy Area, as well as connection to neighborhood along the Red River, like Chèm and Xuân Đỉnh.

Along most of the at-grade portions, there is no posted speed limits. A limit of 60 km/h (35 mph) applies on all of at-grade segments, the highest speed limit for urban thoroughfares in Vietnam.

=== Thăng Long bridge ===
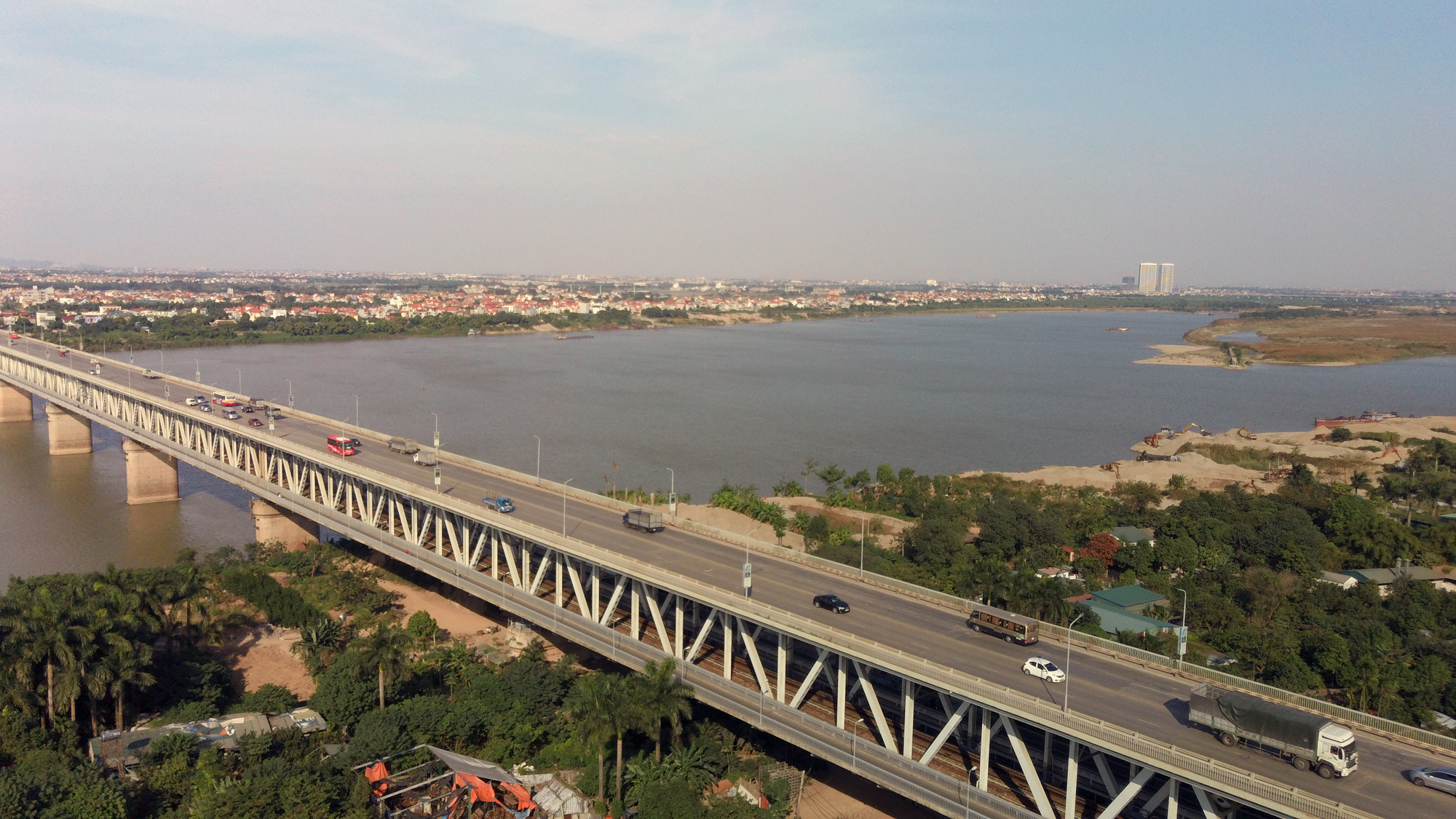
Thăng Long bridge looking south toward central Hanoi.

The Thăng Long bridge is a major bridge crossing the Red River, connecting Hanoi with Nội Bài International Airport and northwestern provinces such as Vĩnh Phúc, Phú Thọ and Lào Cai. It is the only double-decker bridge in Vietnam, with the upper level carrying Ringway 3, while the lower level carrying 2 vehicle lanes for each direction, and a railroad bypassing Hanoi in between.

While this bridge is not built to freeway standards, it was grandfathered into Ringway 3 in the 1990s, as it would be impractical to modify this bridge to comply with design standards. The upper level is an undivided highway, with 2 lanes for each direction. The maximum speed allowed is 80 km/h on the upper deck, and 50 km/h on the lower deck.

Since its opening in 1985, Thăng Long bridge serves as a vital connection between Hanoi and northwestern provinces of Vietnam. Before its opening, all traffic crossing the Red River must either cross the old Long Biên bridge, or using the Chương Dương floating bridge (later fully built to a bridge). Before the opening of Nhật Tân bridge a few miles downstream back in 2016, this bridge is also the only main connection between central Hanoi and Nội Bài airport.

Due to its importance, the bridge often suffers from frequent congestion during weekends and holidays. In addition, this bridge also serves as a major truck route between Hanoi and major industrial centers in northern Hanoi and Vĩnh Phúc. As a result, the bridge has been carrying substantially more traffic, especially heavy good vehicles than its designed capacity, leading to serious deterioration. Thăng Long bridge has had 2 major repairs: The first one in 2009, the second one completed in 2021.

== History ==
=== Pre-planning (before 1990s) ===
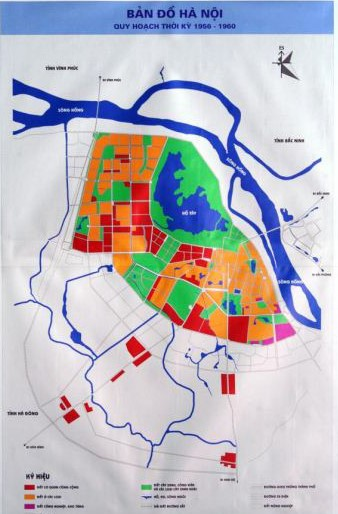
The master plan for Hanoi, published in the mid-1950s. The plan called for the construction of several ring roads and a bridge (located on the top left), which would later be built as Thăng Long bridge.

What is now Ringway 3 has been on planning of Hanoi since at least the 1960s. After the end of the First Indochina War, Hanoi was placed under control of the North Vietnamese government. As a consequence, the structure of the city was significantly influenced by socialist idealism and, in the process, the North Vietnamese government realized the need for a cohesive urban master plan of Hanoi. The first of such plan called for the development of four inner boroughs (now knowns as the 4 "central districts" of Hai Bà Trưng, Hoàn Kiếm, Ba Đình and Đống Đa, though some areas have been taken to form the newer districts of Tây Hồ, Thanh Xuân, and Cầu Giấy). In addition, the plan also included a network of arterial and ring roads, many of them would be construct later, including Ringway 3.

The first segment of Ringway 3 to be built was Thăng Long bridge. This bridge was first planned in the 1960s to connect Hanoi with major industrial centers of Việt Trì and Thái Nguyên. Construction started in 1974, with the help of China. However, relations between two countries deteriorate, and construction was halted shortly before the breakout of the Sino-Vietnamese war in 1979. After the signing of the Soviet - Vietnam friendship treaty, the Soviet agreed to completed the bridge in form of official funding assistance. Construction resumed on summer of 1979, and the bridge was opened to traffic in May 1985.

By the early 1990s, Hanoi's population was rising after implementing a series of economic reform, called Doi Moi. As a result, there was a need for a more comprehensive planning of Hanoi. The master plan of 1992 introduced plans to build ringways around Hanoi. As the country experienced significant economic growth after the implementation of Doi Moi, the number of vehicles (especially commercial vehicles) skyrocketed, while the road network hadn't been upgraded due to economic turmoil in the 1980s. A study by JICA in the mid-1990s recommend the construction of a new bridge and an elevated highway bypassing the densely populated area of Hanoi, with an estimate cost of around US$350 million in 1998 (roughly 640 million USD in 2022 dollar).

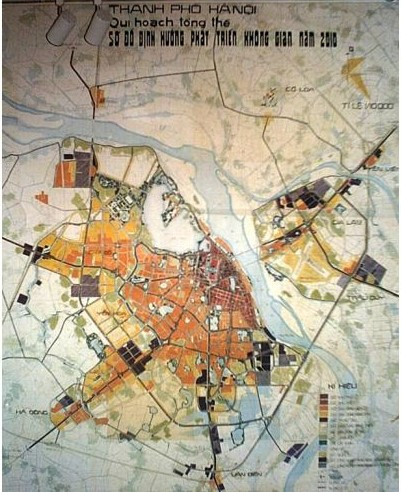
The 1992 master plan of Hanoi showed a ring road encircled the outer part of Hanoi. Most of the later built Ringway 3 follow this map.

Ringway 3 was officially approved as a part of the revised master plan in June 1998, along with Ringway 1 and Ringway 2. By then, Ringway 3 consisted of Khuất Duy Tiến Blvd (which was then a 2-lane street connecting apartment complexes in Thanh Xuân and what would later be the Hòa Lạc expressway), Phạm Hùng Blvd (which was then also a 2-lane street) and Phạm Văn Đồng Blvd, running from Mai Dịch junction to Thăng Long Bridge (and Nội Bài Airport).

=== At-grade segments and Thanh Trì Bridge (2000s) ===
Construction of Ringway 3 started with two segments: The widening of Khuất Duy Tiến Blvd and the widening of Phạm Hùng Blvd. Land acquisition started in August 2001, and originally planned to open in June 2003, in time for SEA Games 22. The original project was expected to cost 820 billion VND in 2001 (US$95 million in 2022).

However, due to disagreements over compensation on the Khuất Duy Tiến Blvd segment, by April 2006 only about half the road was completed, while the rest remained under construction, with the expectation to complete in time for the 2006 APEC Summit. By April 2007, the city of Hanoi decided to use eminent domain to speed up construction, with the goal of completion being the 1000th anniversary of Hanoi. By mid 2009, an agreement over compensation was made between the city and local residents, and by the summer of 2010, Khuất Duy Tiến Blvd was opened to traffic.

The widening of Phạm Hùng Blvd, on the other hand, did not run into much problems (as most of the surrounding were farmland). By around 2005, Phạm Hùng Blvd was widening to 60 metres (200 ft), with four lanes and a wide median. A new overpass connecting Phạm Hùng Blvd and Phạm Văn Đồng Blvd was also completed in the same year.

Around 2006, construction on the segment from Nguyễn Trãi Blvd to Highway 1 started. This segment required the construction of a brand new arterial road through sparsely populated, mostly farmland area of Thanh Trì district. Since there were many gravesites on the farmland, construction was slowed down noticeably. Later when opened in early 2010, this section was named Nghiêm Xuân Yêm Blvd; and Nguyễn Xiển Blvd.

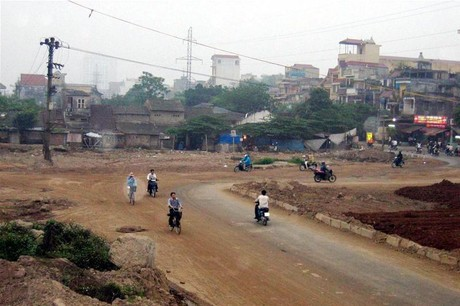
Ringway 3 under construction, around Khuất Duy Tiến Blvd (mid-2005)

The 1998 plan also called for the construction of a brand new bridge crossing Red River (later named Thanh Trì bridge). Construction of Thanh Trì bridge started on 30 November 2001, and the bridge, together with extensions to Highway 1 and Highway 5 was expected to be completed by summer of 2006. The main bridge was completed on time, and was opened to traffic in February 2007. However, both extensions to Highway 5 and Highway 1 was delayed significantly, with the main problem being difficulties in land acquisition. The eastern extension to Highway 5, expected to be completed in March 2008, was delayed and opened in March 2009. Meanwhile, the western extension to Highway 1 experienced serious delay as well. While both extension was originally planned to be completed alongside the main bridge, by October 2008 only half the at-grade portion (service road) were completed. As a result, the western extension was late for its completion in November 2008, and was finally finished alongside the completion of Pháp Vân viaduct in September 2010.

While Thanh Trì bridge was being built, another segment of Ringway 3 was also getting worked on. In the late 1990s, the Government of Vietnam built a section of Highway 1 that would bypass the populated area of Từ Sơn, Bắc Ninh and Bắc Giang. When it was completed in the early 2000s, most of it was already a 4-lane, divided highway, with Phù Đổng bridge being the only 2-lane section. With the completion of Thanh Trì bridge, a single bridge would not be sufficient to handle the amount of traffic. The second Phù Đổng bridge began construction in October 2008, and was completed in January 2012.

=== First elevated portion (2008 - 2012) ===
With the construction of Thanh Trì Bridge, there was a need for a highway connecting major expressway around Hanoi (Pháp Vân expressway and then under construction Hòa Lạc expressway) to it and beyond (Highway 5 and Highway 1). As part of the 1998 plan, the city decided to build an urban freeway on the median of the at-grade Ringway 3.

Construction of the first elevated segment (Pháp Vân viaduct) began in September 2009. This segment included a new interchange with Pháp Vân expressway and a viaduct crossing Linh Đàm Lake. This segment was completed in September 2010.

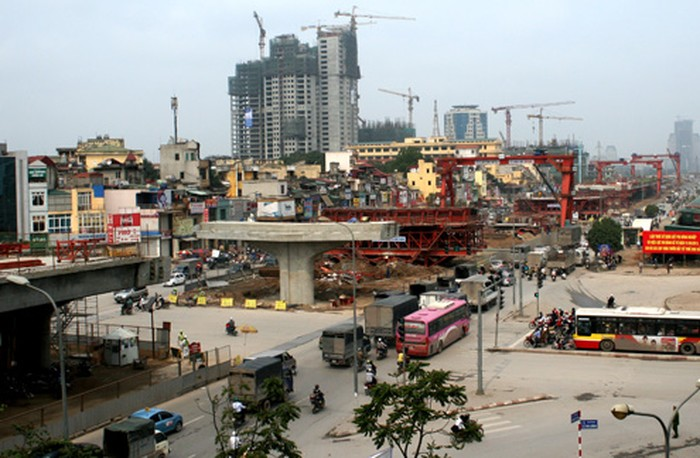
Elevated Ringway 3 under construction, near Lê Văn Lương Ave. junction (April 2012)

The rest of elevated Ringway 3 (between Mai Dịch and Pháp Vân viaduct) started construction in June 2010, and was opened to traffic in October 2012 (15 months earlier than expected), with the cost of 5.54 trillion VND. The elevated freeway and Thanh Trì bridge were expected to reduce congestion, allowing vehicle to connect between major expressway without using busy surface streets in central Hanoi.

=== Second elevated portion (2017 - 2022) ===
With the completion of the first elevated portion from Pháp Vân interchange to Mai Dịch, the Ministry of Transportation wants to complete Ringway 3 by the mid-2020s. To completed Ringway 3, the MoT decided to build another elevated freeway from Mai Dịch junction to Thăng Long bridge, as well as widening the at-grade Phạm Văn Đồng Blvd, which was then a frequently congested 4-lane road. This segment was planned to be built from 2015 to 2017, with an estimated costs was 5.3 trillion VND (US$215 million).

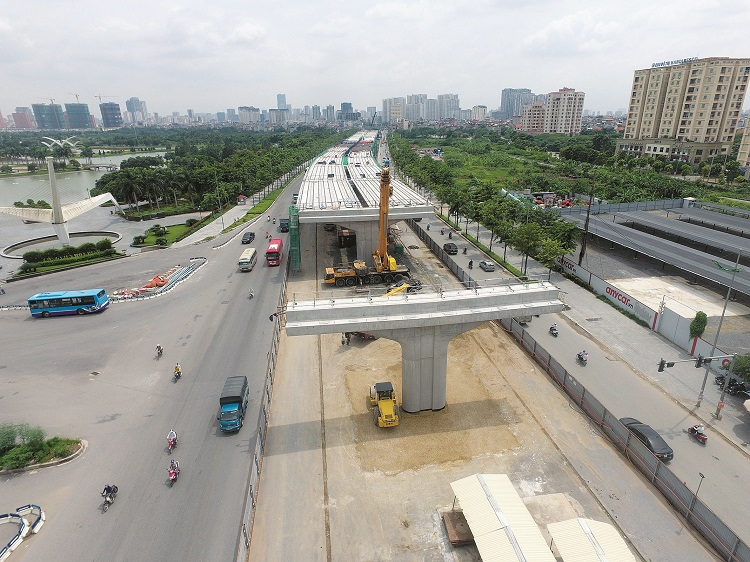
Elevated Ringway 3 under construction, above Phạm Văn Đồng Blvd (August 2019)

However, problems in land acquisition (including the controversial decision to cut down around 1,300 trees alongside Phạm Văn Đồng Blvd) had significantly delayed the project. The widening of Phạm Văn Đồng Blvd was completed around summer 2019, while some segments of the elevated portion started construction in late 2018. This section was finally opened to traffic in October 2020, completing Ringway 3 in central Hanoi.

=== Other improvements ===
With most of Ringway 3 completed by the late 2010s, traffic condition was expected to improve. However, during the 2010s, the number of vehicles in Hanoi has skyrocketed, leading to severe congestion. In addition to that, a boom in new developments alongside the newly completed Ringway 3 corridor has contributed to worsening traffic condition.

To solve these problems, HNDoT has built an underpass in junction with Lê Văn Lương Ave, a major intersection with Ringway 3 which often suffers from serious delays. In addition, a new overpass crossing Linh Đàm Lake was completed in September 2020, providing access to Linh Đàm, a densely neighborhood south of Hanoi.

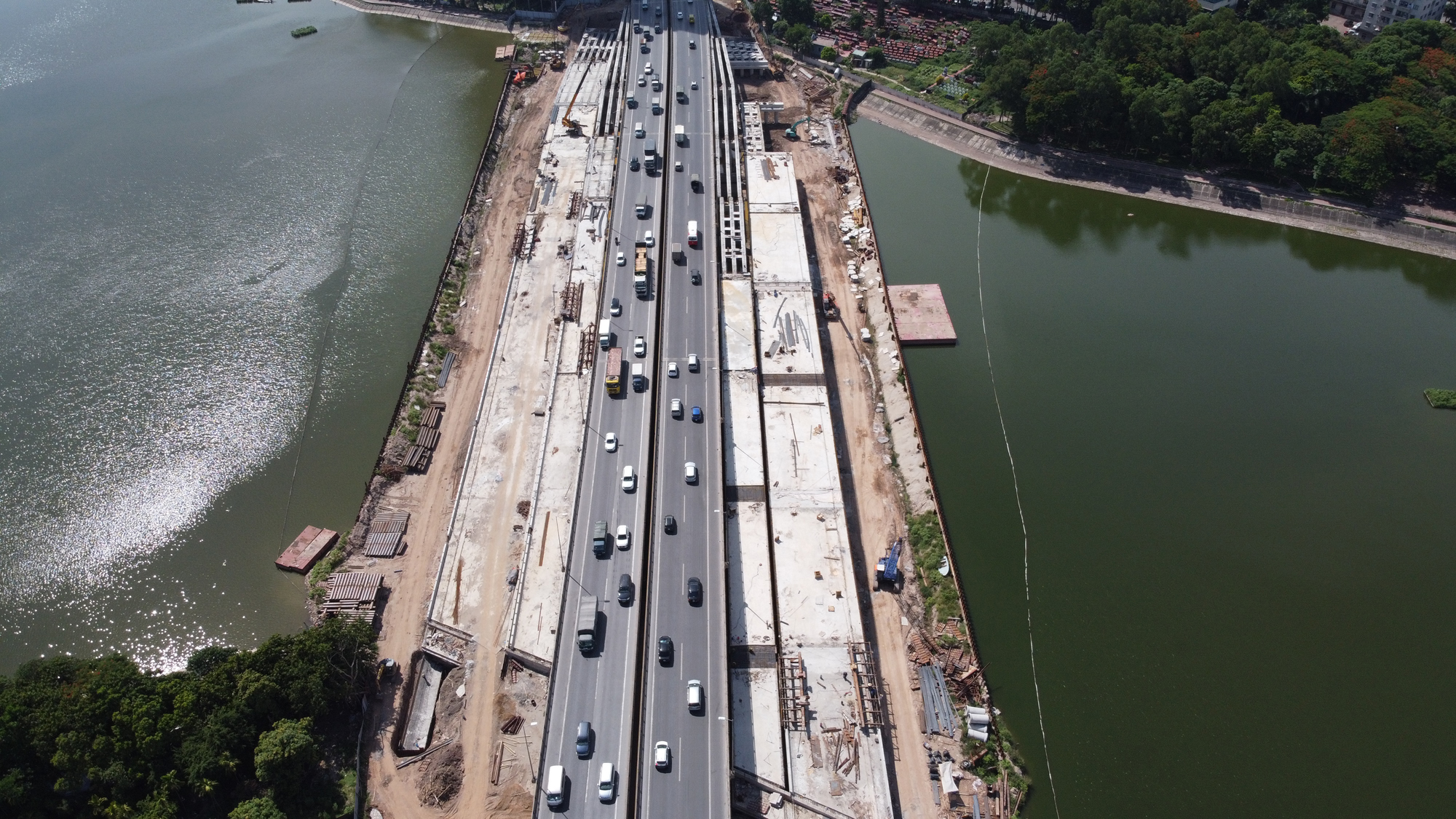
Linh Đàm lake overpass under construction. Two new bridges for at-grade traffic were built, as well as ramps for connecting to Elevated Ringway 3 (June 2020)

== Exit list ==
The National Standard for Traffic Controlling Devices does not require exits on freeway to be numbered. Exits listed here are for reference only

District	km	Exit	Destinations	Notes
Gia Lâm	0	1	CT.07 (Thái Nguyên expressway) - Thái Nguyên, Nội Bài International Airport	Continues south toward Hanoi as overlapped with Highway 1A
Gia Lâm	0.7	2	Ninh Hiệp Industrial Park	Southbound (toward Hanoi) exit and entrance only
Gia Lâm	2.6	3	Phù Đổng	
Long Biên	5.7	4	Phúc Lợi Street	Southbound (toward Thanh Trì bridge) exit only
Long Biên	6.6	5	QL 5A / AH14 - Hải Phòng, Cầu Chui Junction	
Long Biên	8.3	6	CT.04 (Hải Phòng expressway) - Hải Dương, Hải Phòng, Cổ Linh Ave	
Long Biên	9.4	7	Bát Tràng	
Hoàng Mai	13.2	8	Lĩnh Nam Rd	
Hoàng Mai	16.8	9	Tam Trinh Rd	Southbound (toward Pháp Vân) entrance and northbound (toward Thanh Trì bridge) exit only
Hoàng Mai	18.3	10	CT.01 (Pháp Vân expressway) and (Giải Phóng & Ngọc Hồi Blvd) - Ninh Bình, Nam Định, Central Hanoi	Pháp Vân interchange, overlap with Highway 1A ends
Hoàng Mai	20.2	11	Nguyễn Hữu Thọ Ave	Northbound (toward Mai Dịch) exit and southbound (toward Pháp Vân) entrance only
Thanh Xuân	23.7	12	QL 6A / AH13 (Nguyễn Trãi Blvd) - Hòa Bình, Hà Đông, Central Hanoi	Thanh Xuân junction
Cầu Giấy	25.6	13	CT.03 (Hòa Lạc expressway) - Hòa Bình, Hòa Lạc, Central Hanoi	Trung Hòa junction
Cầu Giấy	29.7	14	QL 32 (Hồ Tùng Mậu Blvd & Xuân Thủy Ave) - Nhổn, Sơn Tây and Central Hanoi	Mai Dịch junction
Cầu Giấy	32.0	15	Hoàng Quốc Việt Blvd	Northbound (toward Thăng Long bridge) entrance and southbound (toward Mai Dịch) exit only
North Từ Liêm	32.3	16	Cổ Nhuế Rd	
North Từ Liêm	34.7	17	Ciputra Hanoi International City	
Đông Anh	40.2	18	QL 5A / AH14	

== Congestion ==
Since its completion in 2010, Ringway 3 (both elevated and at-grade sections) are among the busiest roadways in Vietnam.

Ringway 3 is the only major freeway around densely populated area of Hanoi; as well as the only freeway bypassing the city. In addition, most expressway connecting Hanoi with other regions terminates in Ringway 3, forcing traffic onto this highway, worsening congestion. Not only does Ringway 3 serves bypassing traffic, it plays a major role in traffic moving from, to, and around central Hanoi. Most of new developments in Hanoi since 2010 are located close to Ringway 3, the majority of which are middle to high income neighborhoods, significantly increasing the number of vehicles on this corridor.

As a result, this highway carries significant more traffic than it was designed to. While most of elevated segments and the Thanh Trì bridge was designed to handle around 15,000 vehicles/day, past traffic counts showed that Ringway 3 carries around 8 to 10 times its designed capacity, make it comparable to traffic count on some of the world's busiest ringways - like Interstate 405 around Los Angeles, California or the M25 motorway around London, UK. The last official count by Hanoi's Department of Transportation showed that in 2021, Ringway 3 handled around 124,000 vehicles/day. On rush hour and holidays, the average speed is as slow as 20 km/h, far below the speed limit. There has been multiple instances of severe congestion lasting to midnight on holidays like Tết or Liberation Day.

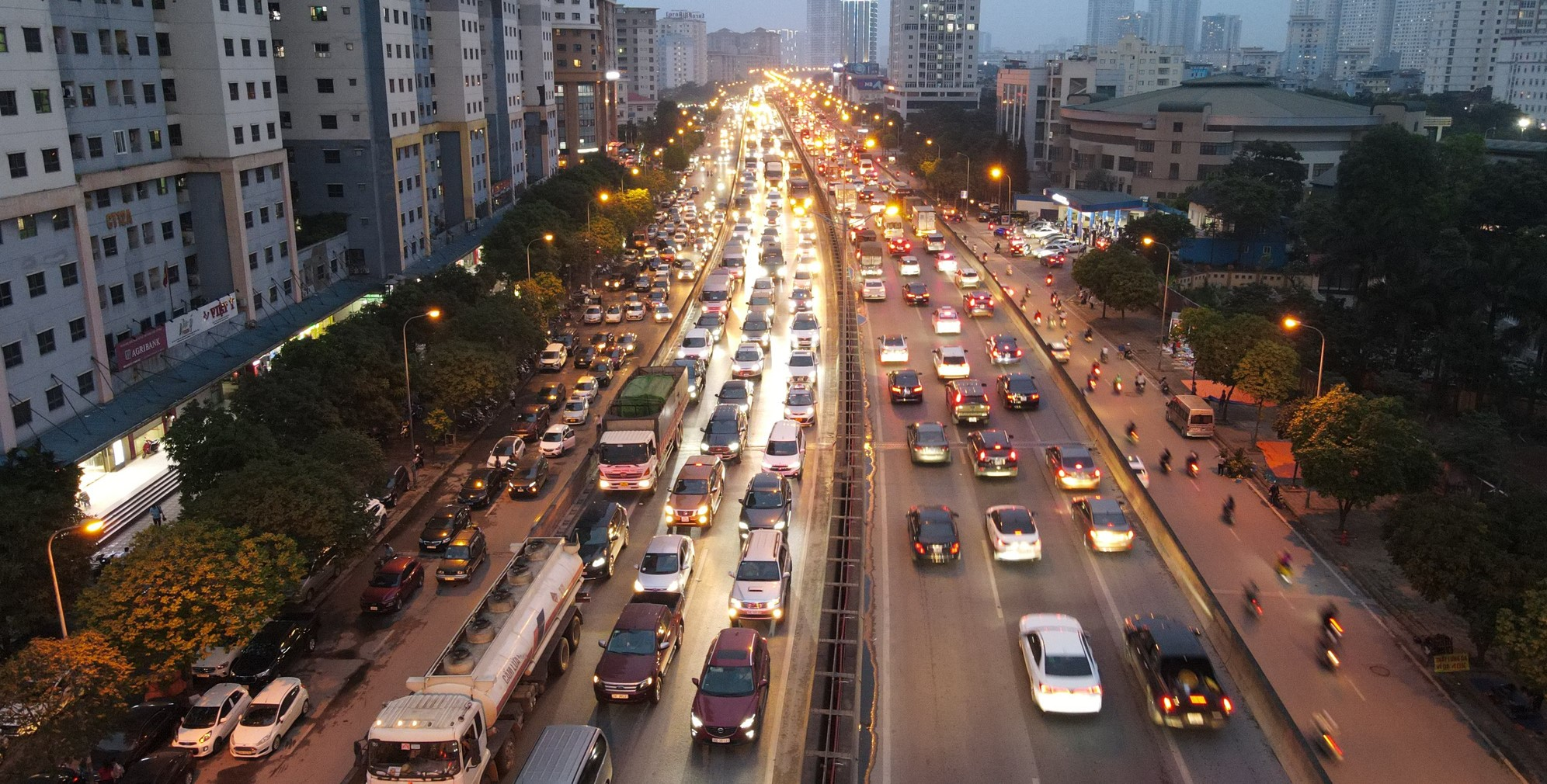
Congested Ringway 3 before Liberation Day holiday.

In addition to high amount of traffic, the design of elevated freeway segments is also another source of congestion. Despite being the terminus for most expressway connecting Hanoi to other part of the country, almost all junctions on Ringway 3 are diamond interchange with traffic light, with the interchange with Hải Phòng expressway and Highway 5 being completely traffic light-free. Another problem is spacing between exits. Some exits on Ringway 3 are significantly closer than design standard. Exits to Hòa Lạc expressway and Highway 6, for instance, are spaced at about 1 km, while the National Standard for Construction of Freeways and Expressway recommends exits to be at least 3 to 5 km apart.

== Controversies ==
=== Collapse of Pháp Vân viaduct ===
Around noon of 18 April 2010, several spans of the Pháp Vân - Mai Dịch segment (then called Pháp Vân viaduct) collapsed into the below ground. No one was hurt in the incident. An investigation by the Ministry of Transportation concluded that there are several factors leading to the collapse of the span, with the main factors being the improper placement of the collapsed span on elastomeric bearing pads.

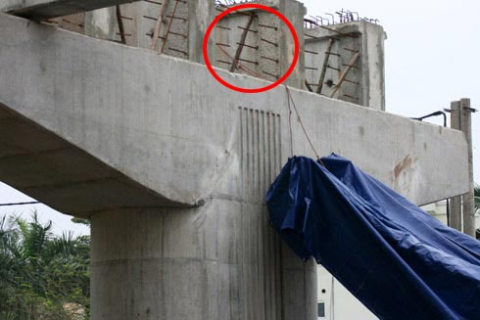
Instead of being connected horizontally, each grider that made up the span was connected only by a piece of wood (circled in red), leading to the collapse of the span.

=== Removal of trees ===
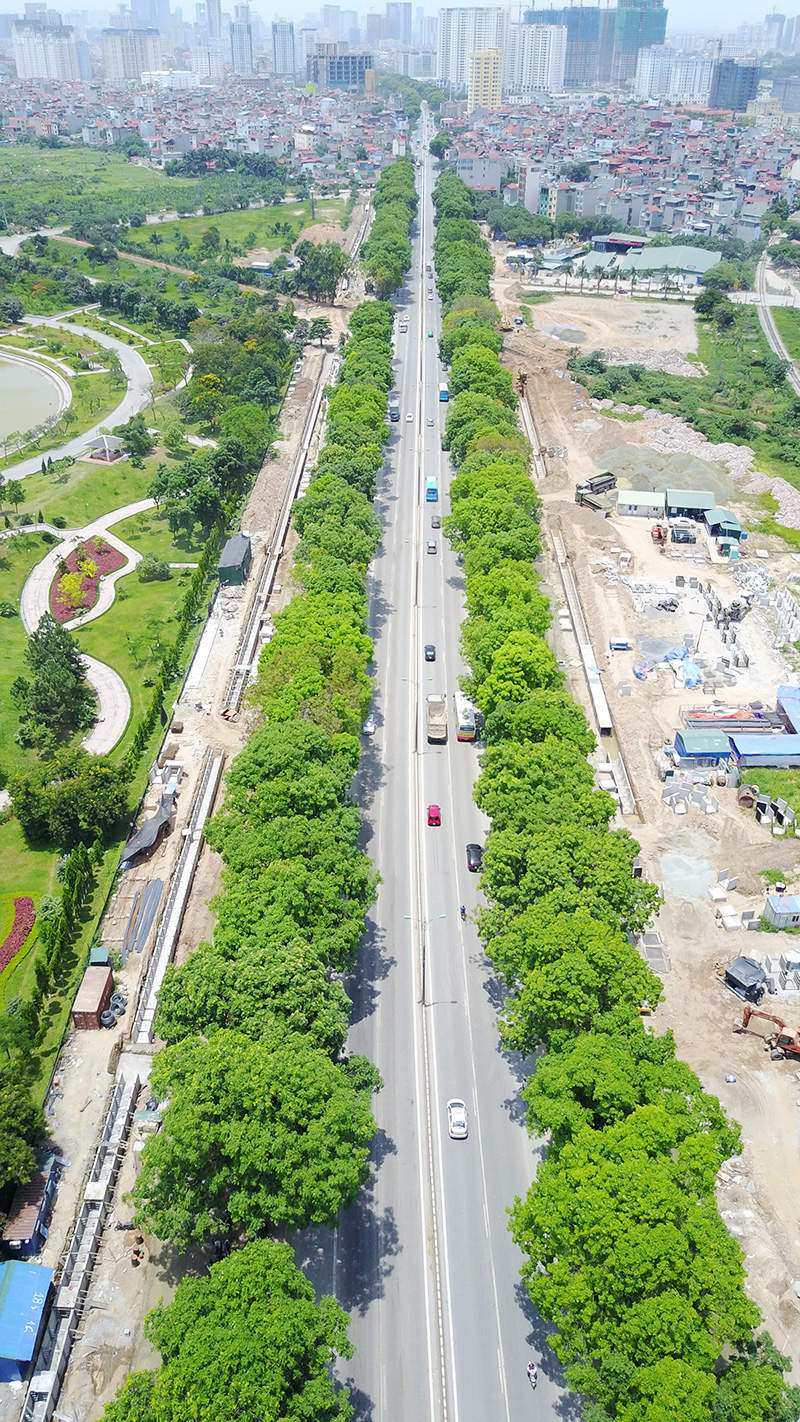
Rows of trees of Phạm Văn Đồng Blvd, before removal for widening (around October 2016). They were later replanted in 2021 after construction was completed.

Unlike most segments of Ringway 3 which requires few (if any) demolitions, the segment between Mai Dịch junction and Thăng Long bridge requires the widening of Phạm Văn Đồng Blvd, which runs through densely populated areas of North Từ Liêm district. In addition to that, the widening also means that around 1,300 trees, with most of them being planted in the 90s, need to be removed. This had sparked debates over how to deal with these trees, as well as bigger questions about urban planning in Hanoi.

Originally, the city want to cut down all of 1,300 trees. However, after facing backlash from residents, the city decided to move around 100 of those trees to other areas. The widening and clearance was completed in summer of 2018, before the construction of second elevated segment. After its completion in 2021, the city planted back trees along the way, restore some aspect of the pre-widening road.

=== Lack of lighting ===
After construction, both the second elevated segment and Phạm Văn Đồng Blvd were left without proper lighting. According to HNDoT, this was due to several procedure issues. The elevated segment was fully lighted in October 2022, while the at-grade segment remained without proper lighting.
