= Thang Long =

Thang Long can refer to:

== Hanoi ==
- Former name of Hanoi
- Imperial Citadel of Thăng Long
- Thăng Long Bridge
- Thang Long Warriors, basketball team

== Communes in Vietnam ==
- Thăng Long, Hải Dương Province, in Kinh Môn, Hải Dương Province
- Thăng Long, Thái Bình Province, in Đông Hưng District, Thái Bình Province
- Thăng Long, Thanh Hóa Province, in Nông Cống District, Thanh Hóa Province

== See also ==
- Tang Long (disambiguation)
