= Long Biên Bridge =

Bridge in Hanoi, Vietnam

Long Bien Bridge Cầu Long Biên
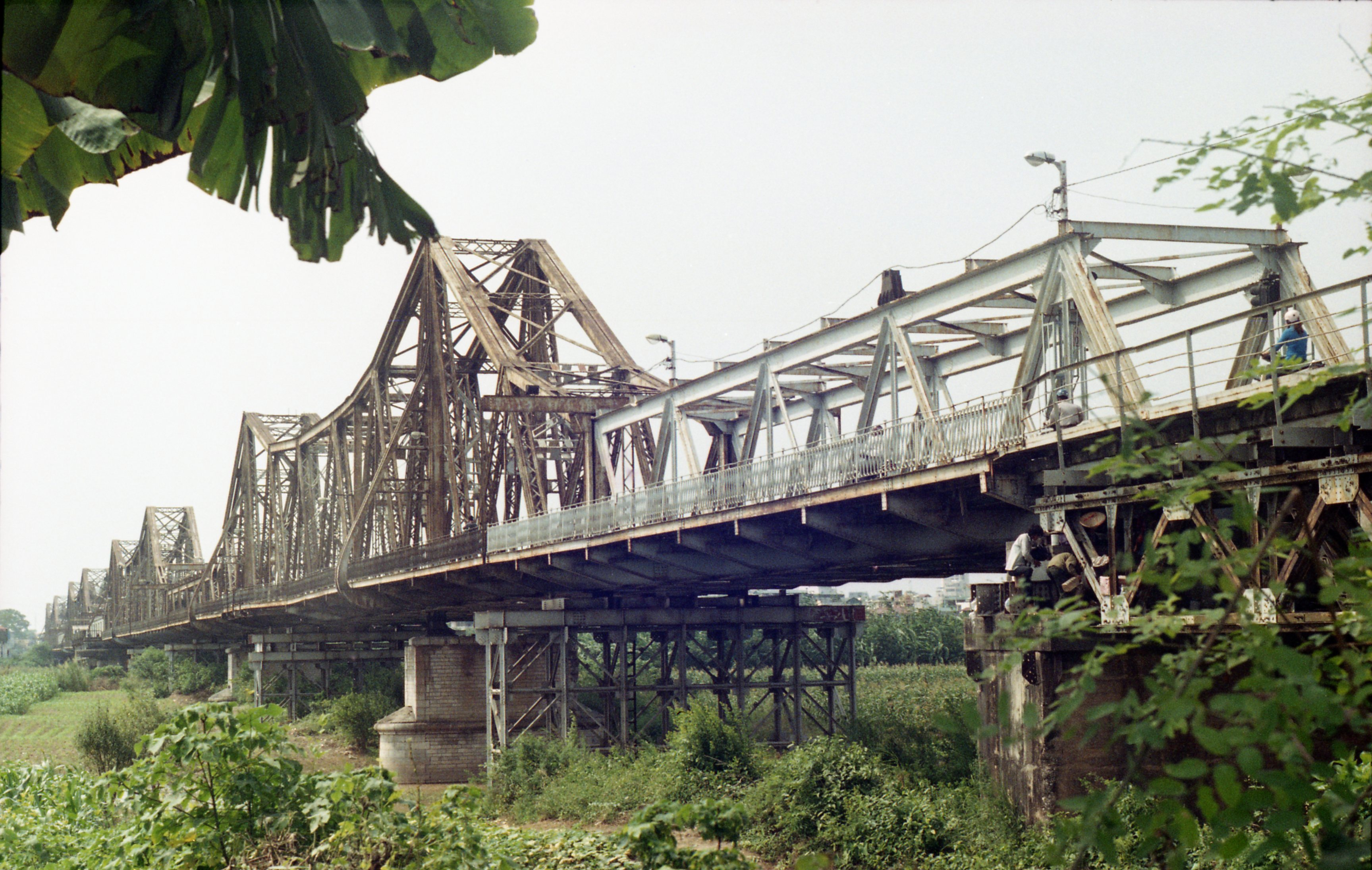
- Coordinates: 21°02′36″N 105°51′32″E
- Carries: Trains, motor vehicles, pedestrians. and bicycles
- Crosses: Red River
- Locale: Hanoi, Vietnam
- Begins: Bồ Đề Ward (formerly part of Long Biên district)
- Ends: Hồng Hà Ward (formerly part of Hoàn Kiếm district)
- Named for: Long Biên district

Characteristics
- Design: Cantilever bridge
- Material: Steel
- Total length: 2,290 m (1.42 mi)
- Width: 13.5m
- Height: 43.5m
- No. of spans: 19

History
- Architect: Daydé & Pillé
- Constructed by: Over 3000 Vietnamese workers
- Construction start: 1899
- Construction end: 1902
- Rebuilt: 1973

Location
- Interactive map of Long Bien Bridge

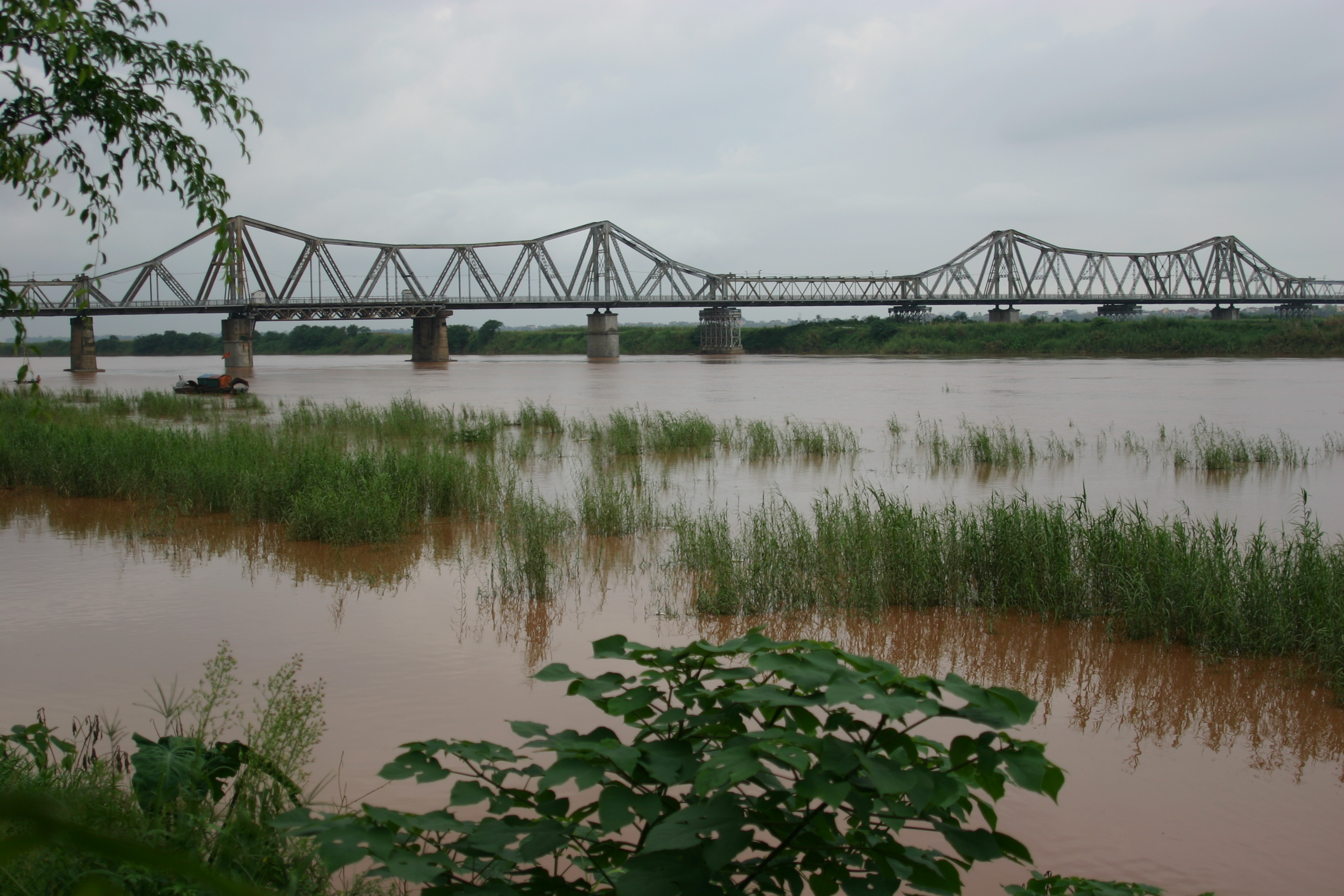
Panoramic view of the bridge

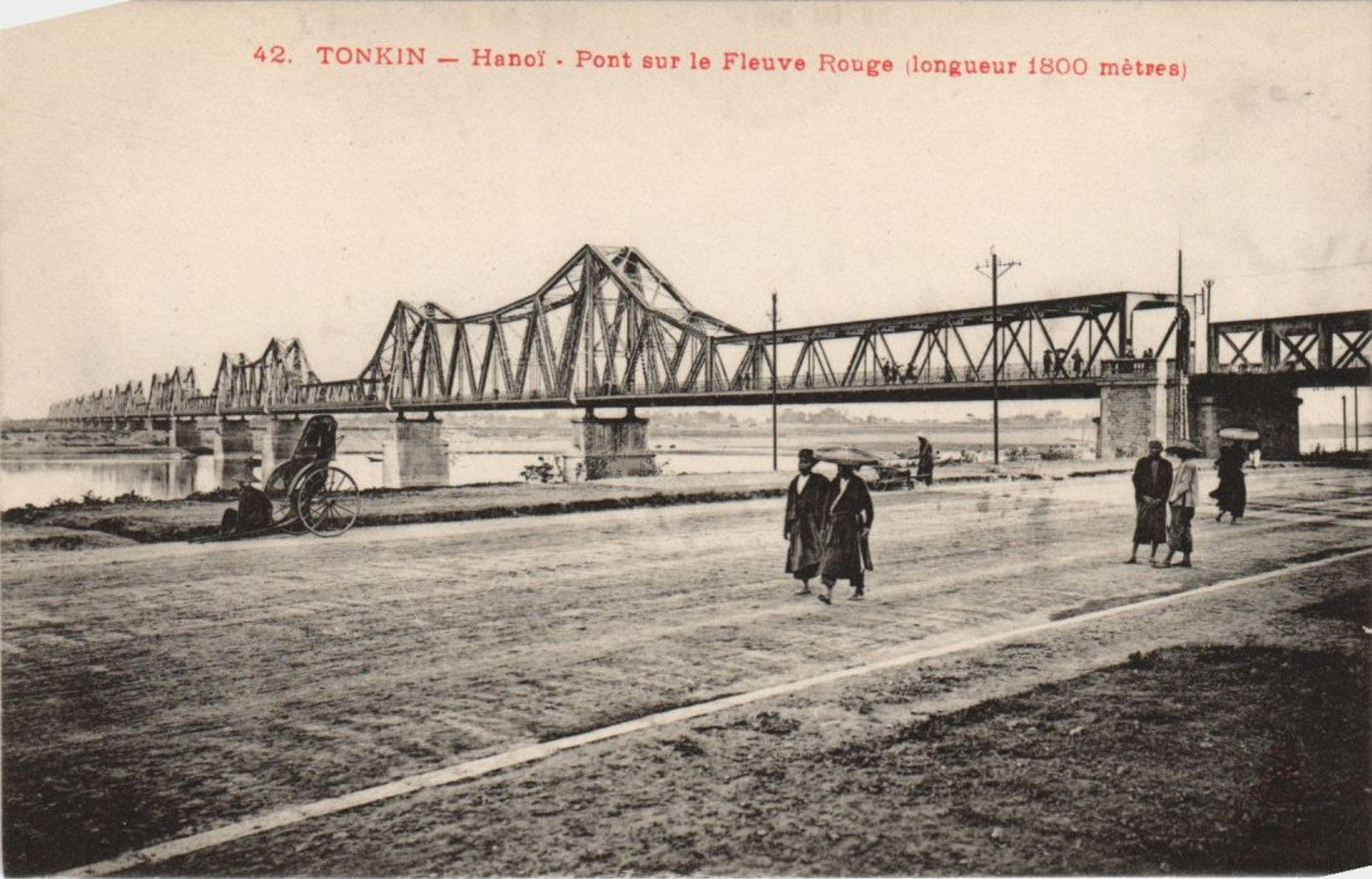
The bridge shortly after its completion

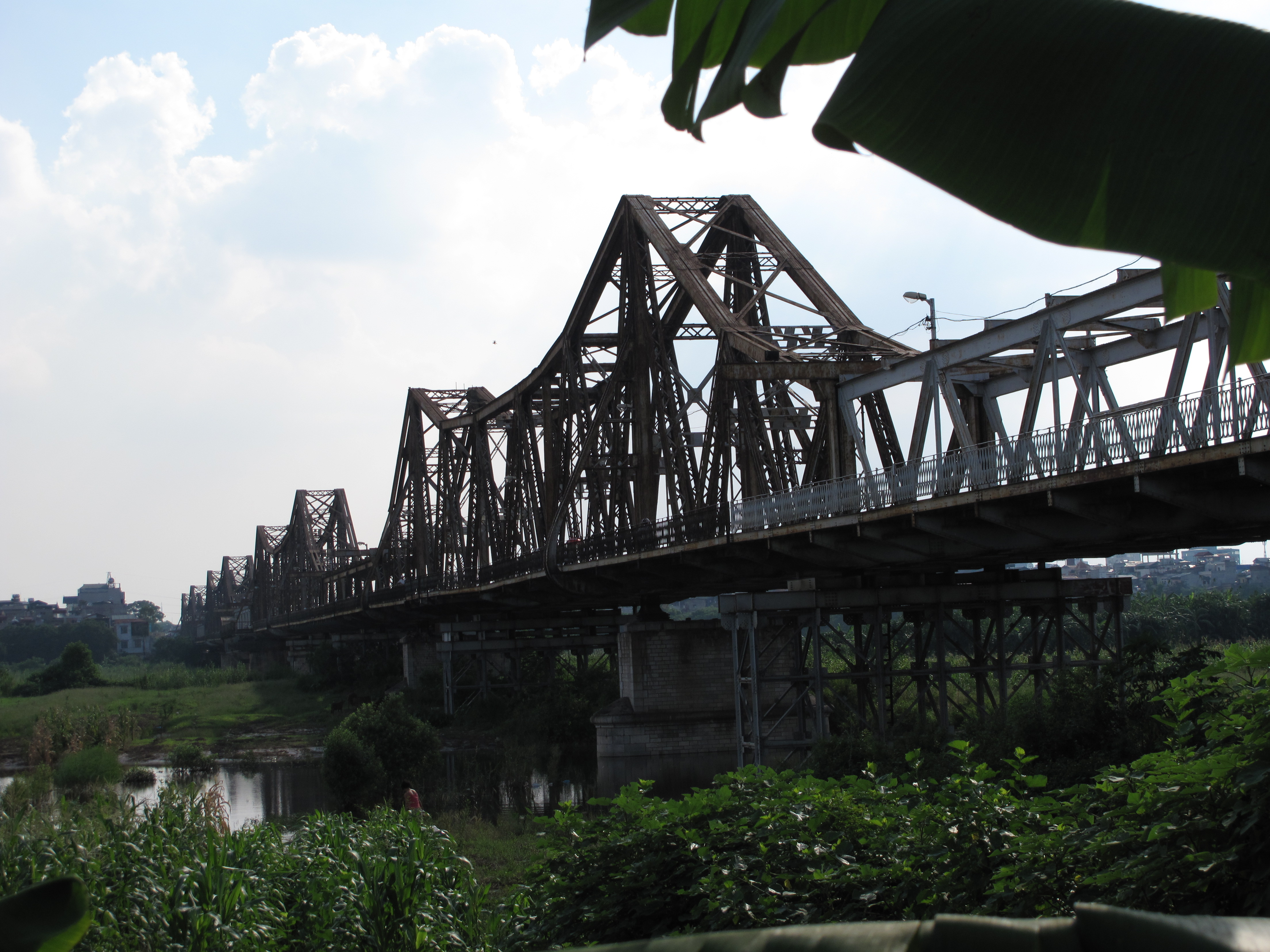
The bridge in 2010

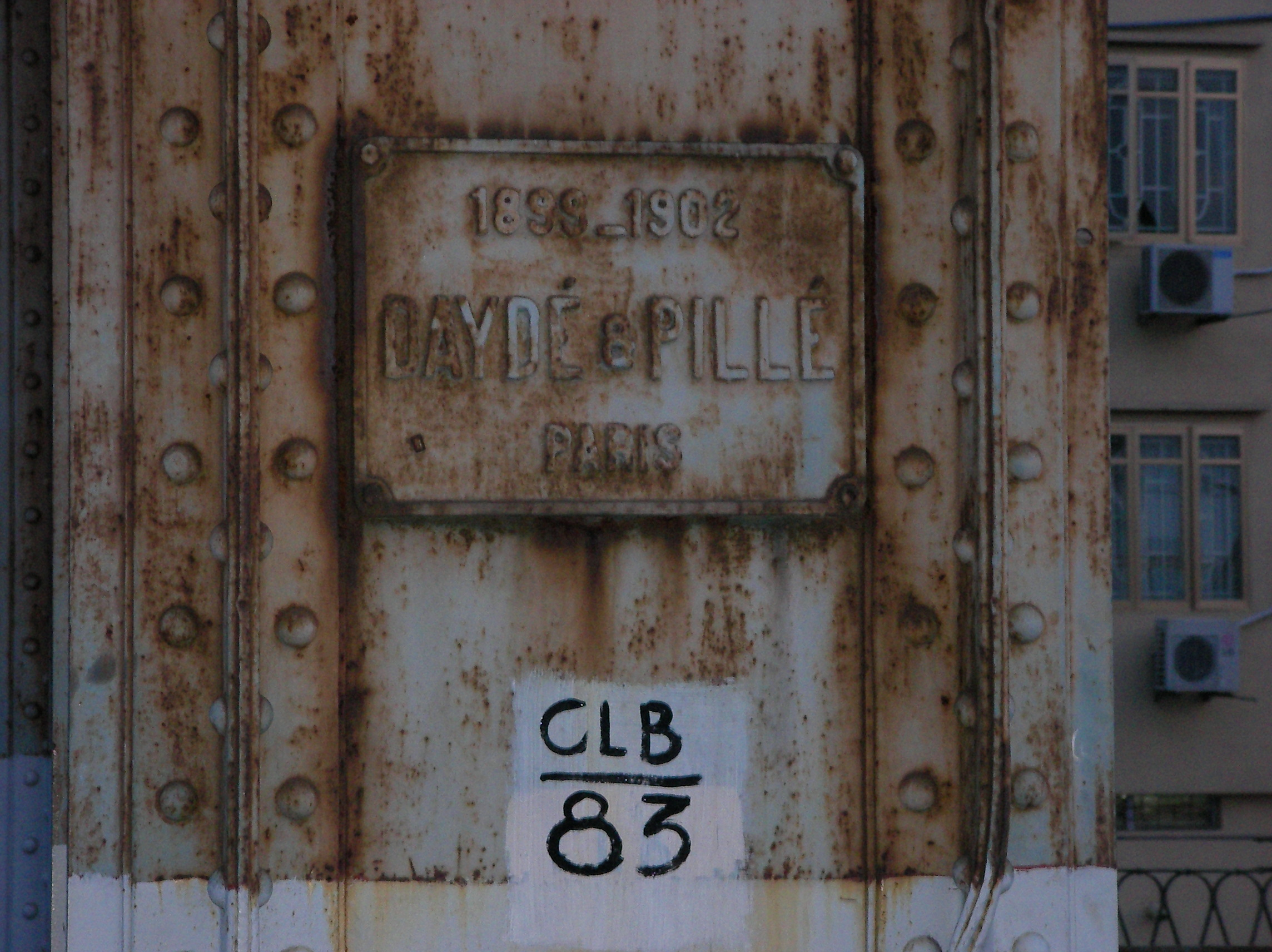
The constructor panel of Daydé & Pillé, Paris

Long Biên Bridge (Vietnamese: Cầu Long Biên) is a historic cantilever bridge across the Red River that connects two districts, Hoàn Kiếm and Long Biên of the city of Hanoi, Vietnam. It was originally called Paul Doumer Bridge.

== History ==
=== During French regime ===
The bridge was built in 1899–1902 by the architects Daydé & Pillé of Paris, and opened in 1903. Before North Vietnam's independence in 1954, it was called Paul-Doumer Bridge, named after Paul Doumer, the governor-general of French Indochina and later the French president. At 2.4 km (1.5 mi) long, it was then one of the longest bridges in Asia. For the French colonial government, the construction was of strategic importance in securing control of northern Vietnam. From 1899 to 1902, more than 3,000 Vietnamese took part in the construction.

=== Vietnam War ===
It was heavily bombed during the Vietnam War becaue of its critical position; it was the only bridge across the Red River that connected Hanoi to the main port of Haiphong. The first attack took place in 1967, and the central span of the bridge was felled by an attack by 20 United States Air Force (USAF) F-105 fighter-bombers on 11 August. CIA reports noted that the severing of the bridge did not appear to have caused as much disruption as had been expected. During the war, many anti-aircraft artillery were placed on the top of the bridge ito protect it from attack.

On 10 May 1972, the bridge was attacked in the first Operation Linebacker attacks in response to the North Vietnamese Easter Offensive. On 13 May the USAF announced that several spans of the bridge had been destroyed by laser-guided bombs (LGB). On 9 August, the USAF announced that another LGB attack had disabled the newly-repaired bridge. On 11 September, the USAF attacked the bridge again as repairs were nearing completion.

=== Modern day ===
Some parts of the original structure remain intact, and large sections have been built later to repair the holes. Only half the bridge retains its original shape. A project with support and loans from the French government is currently in progress to restore the bridge to its original appearance.

Today, trains, mopeds, bicycles, and pedestrians use the dilapidated bridge, and all other traffic is diverted to the nearby Chương Dương Bridge and other bridges: Thanh Trì Bridge, Thăng Long Bridge, Vĩnh Tuy Bridge, and Nhật Tân Bridge.

Under the bridge, poor families live in boats on the Red River. They come from many rural areas of Vietnam.

== Image gallery ==
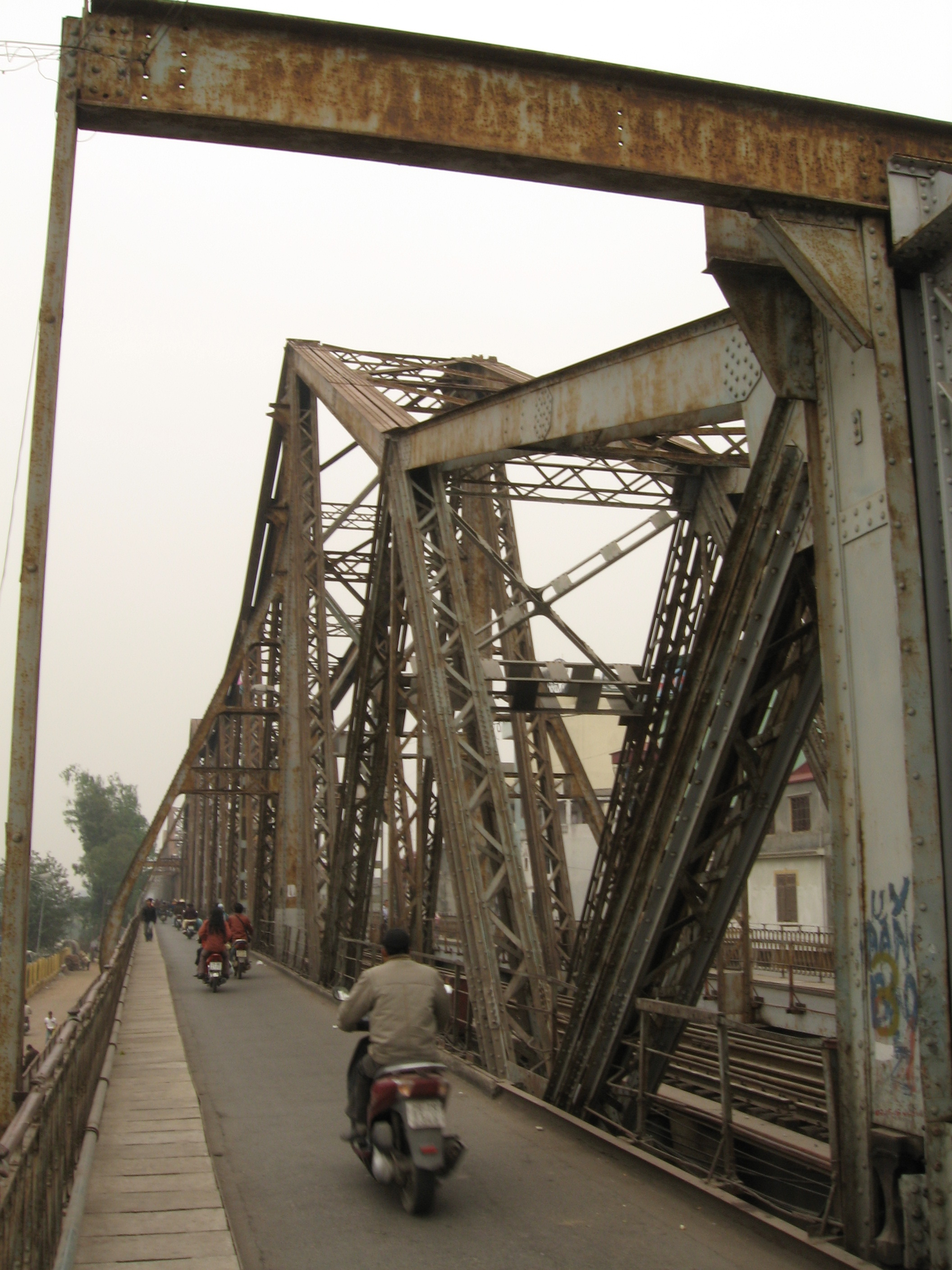
The pathway for pedestrians and two-wheeled vehicles

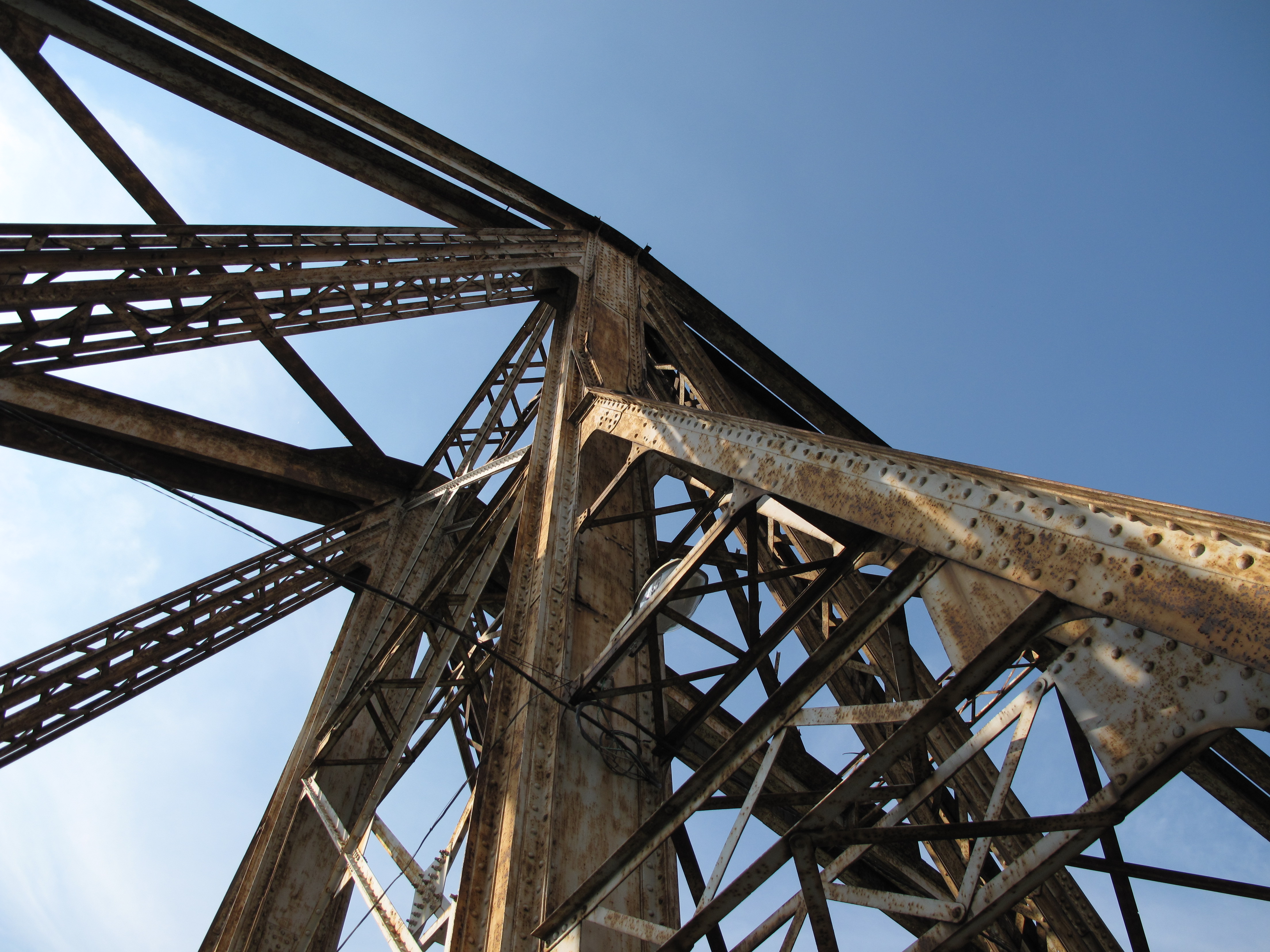
The bridge's iron beams

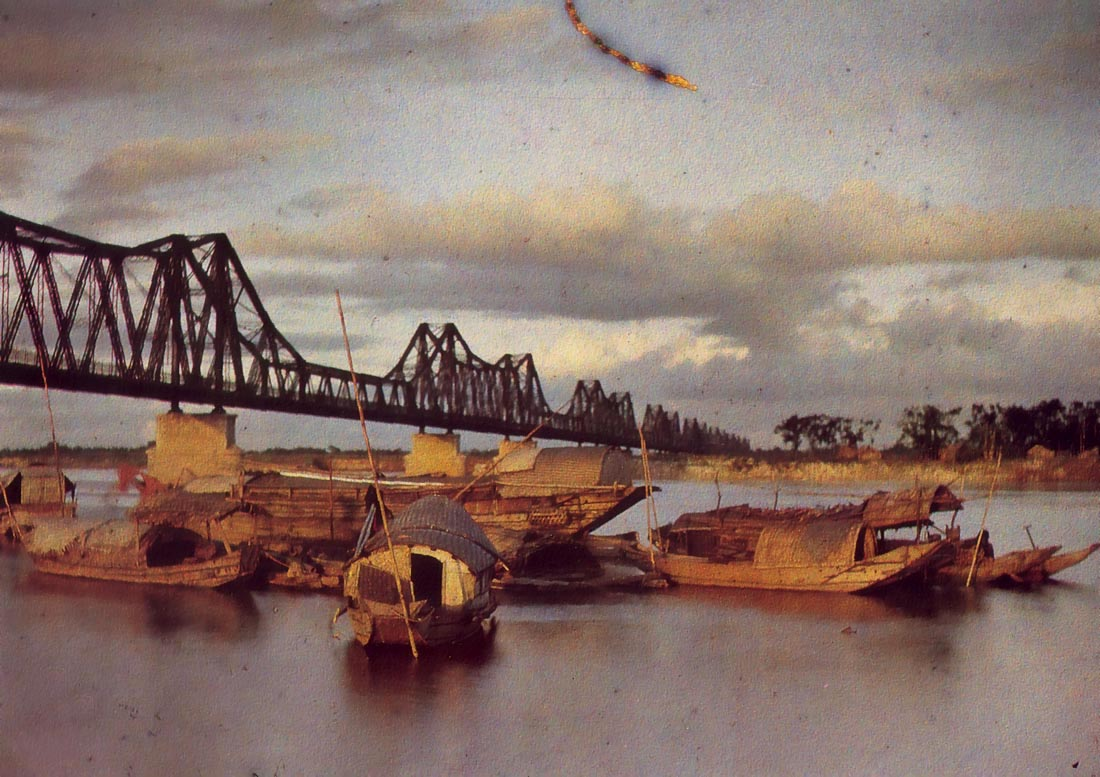
The bridge in 1915

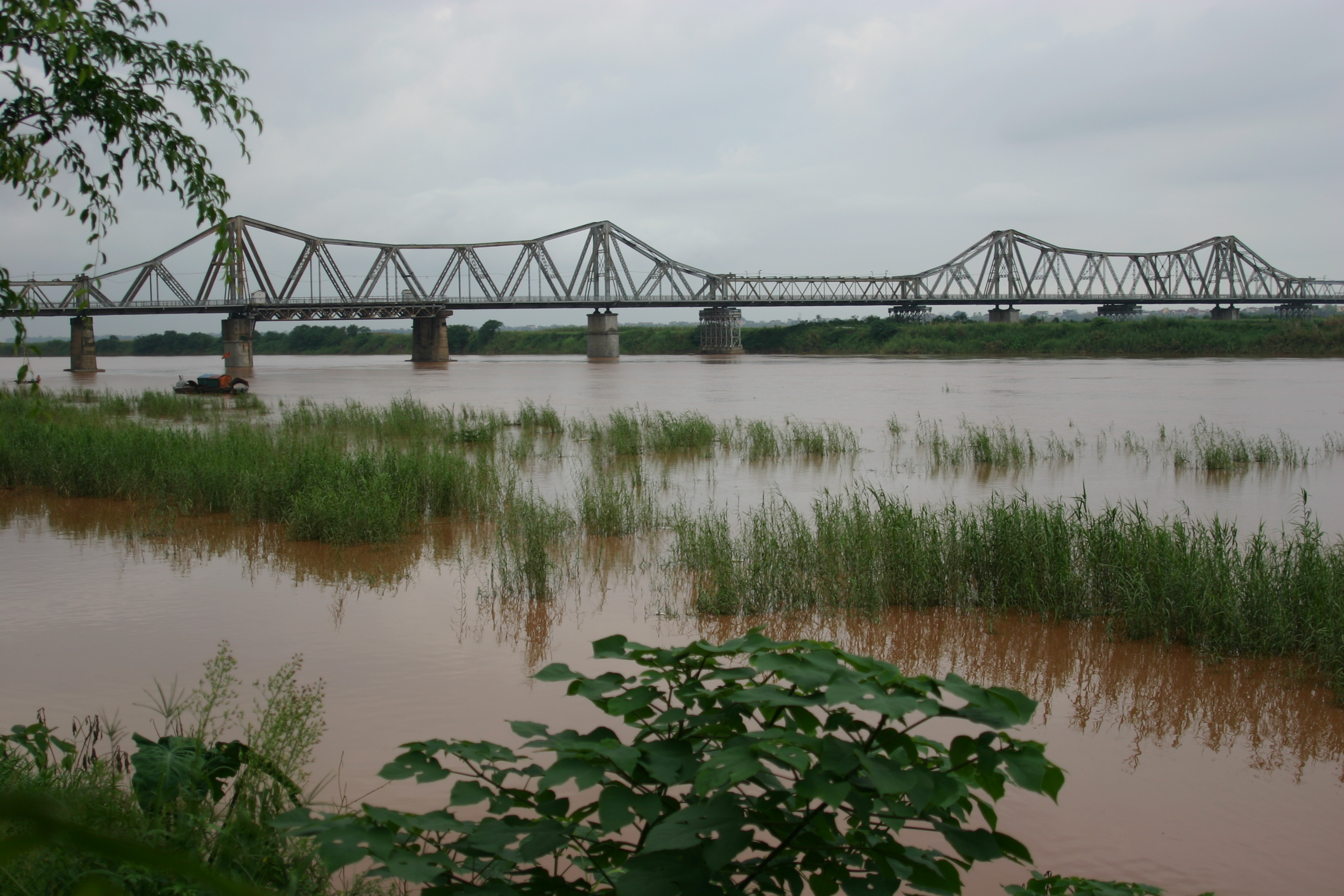
Long Biên Bridge as seen from the Red River

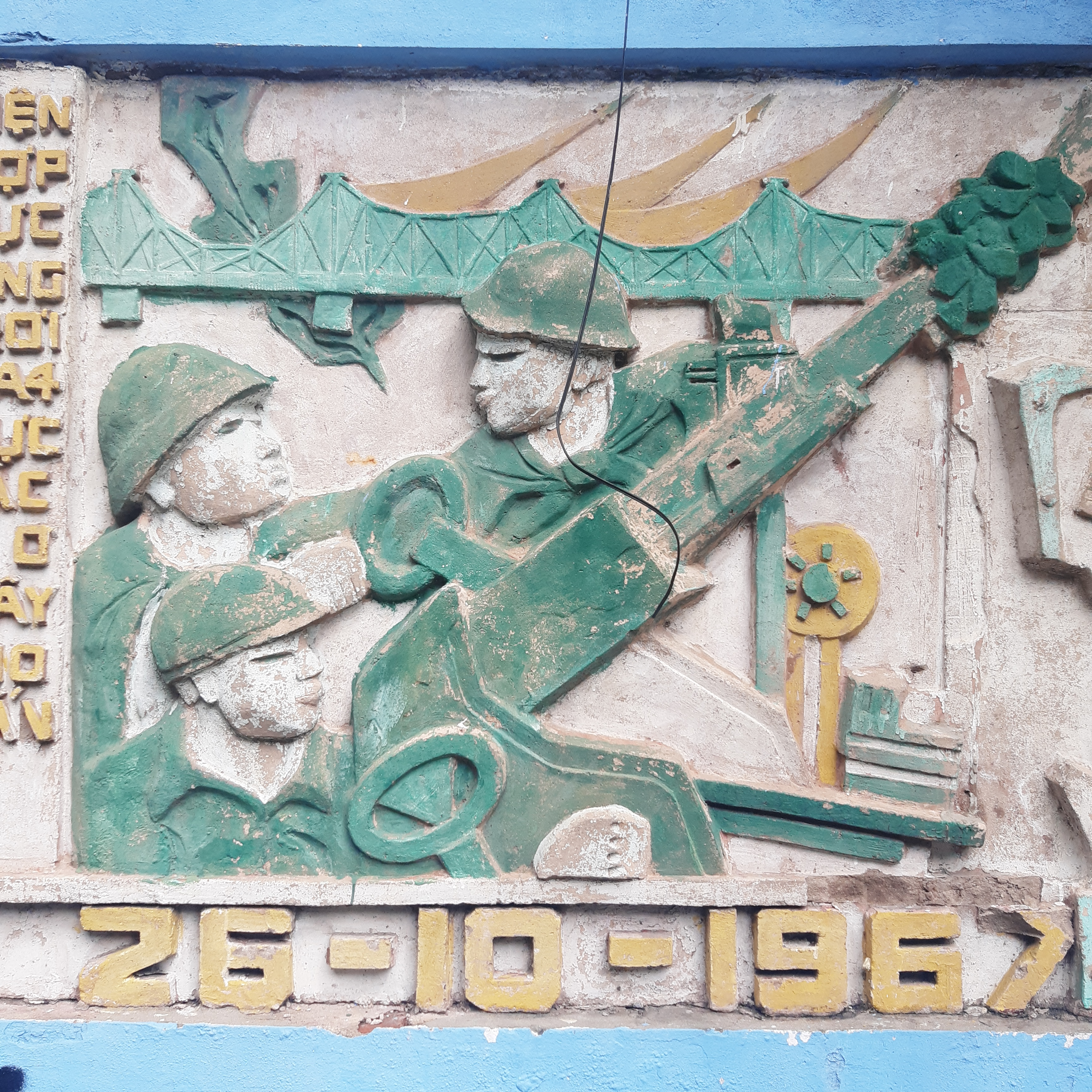
The bridge pictured in a street mural in Hanoi during the Vietnam War
