= Thanh Trì Bridge =

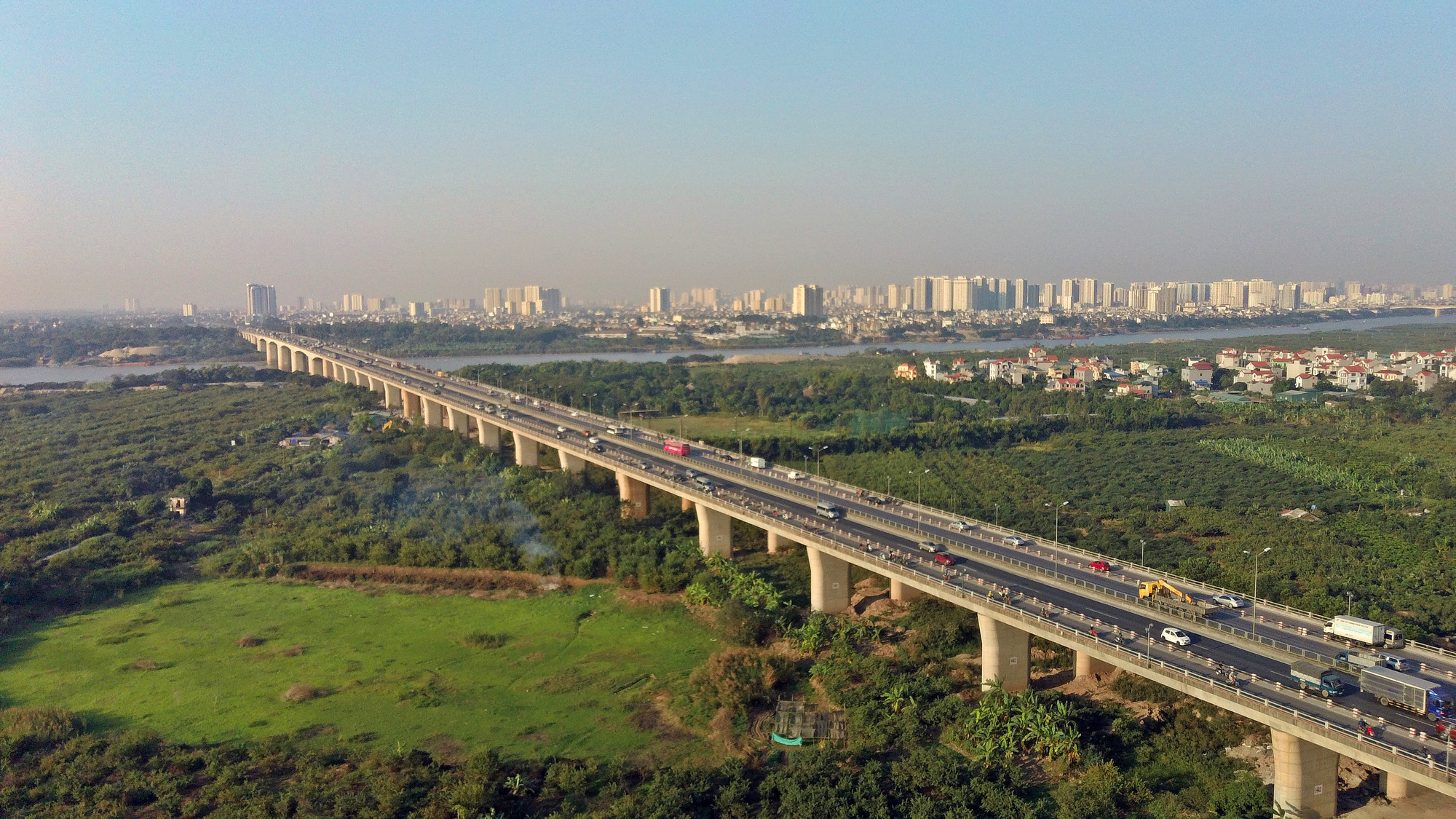
- Thanh Trì Bridge seen from Gia Lam
- Coordinates: 21°06′N 105°47′E
- Crosses: Red River
- Locale: Hoàng Mai – Long Biên, Hanoi, Vietnam

Characteristics
- Design: Prestressed concrete box-girder bridge
- Material: Prestressed concrete
- Total length: 3,084 m (main span); >12 km including approaches
- Width: 33.1 m
- No. of lanes: 6 lanes

History
- Construction start: 2002
- Construction end: 2007 (opened 2008)

Statistics
- Daily traffic: Part of Ring Road 3, National Highway 1A, North–South Expressway

Location
- Interactive map of Thanh Trì Bridge

The Thanh Trì Bridge (Vietnamese: Cầu Thanh Trì) (completed 2008) is a bridge across the Red River in Hanoi, Vietnam. It was one of the Millennial Anniversary of Hanoi commemorative projects along with the Vĩnh Tuy Bridge. At 3,084m it is one of the longest bridges in Asia. It is part of the North-South expressway, and is the largest prestressed concrete bridge in Vietnam.

== History and Construction ==
Construction of the Thanh Trì Bridge was part of Vietnam's broader strategy in the early 2000s to expand and modernize transportation infrastructure in the Hanoi metropolitan area. It was specifically designed to support Ringway 3 (Hanoi), a major expressway that encircles the capital and serves as a bypass for long-haul traffic, reducing congestion in the inner city.

The project broke ground in 2002 as one of the largest bridge projects in Vietnam at the time, both in scale and budget. It was built with official development assistance (ODA) from the Japanese government, coordinated through the Japan International Cooperation Agency (JICA), and constructed by a consortium led by Obayashi Corporation and Sumitomo Mitsui Construction Co., Ltd. In cooperation with Vietnamese construction units.

By 2007, the main structure was completed, and the bridge was fully opened to traffic in 2008, marking a major milestone in Hanoi’s transportation development. The bridge became the longest prestressed concrete bridge in Vietnam, and one of the widest in Southeast Asia upon its completion.

Thanh Trì Bridge also played a symbolic role as one of eight key infrastructure projects commemorating Hanoi’s 1,000th anniversary in 2010. Since its opening, it has significantly alleviated traffic pressure from older bridges such as Chương Dương Bridge and Long Biên Bridge, and has helped improve connectivity between the eastern and southern regions of Hanoi.

== Design and Engineering ==
The Thanh Trì Bridge is designed as a prestressed concrete box-girder bridge, spanning the Red River as part of Hanoi’s Ring Road No. 3 and the North–South Expressway (Vietnam). At the time of its completion, it was recognized as the longest prestressed concrete bridge in Vietnam and among the widest in Southeast Asia.

The main bridge structure measures approximately 3,084 meters in length and is composed of 33 spans of 93.5-meter box girders constructed using segmental cantilever methods. The deck width is 33.1 meters, accommodating six traffic lanes, with shoulders and pedestrian paths on both sides. Each span was built using high-strength, post-tensioned concrete, providing enhanced durability and load-bearing capacity.

The bridge was engineered to withstand flood-level variations of the Red River, and its piers were founded on large-diameter bored piles driven deep into the alluvial riverbed, ensuring structural stability against lateral flow and seismic effects.

To meet stringent construction and quality control standards, advanced technologies such as slip-form construction, automated prestressing, and segment launching gantries were used. The entire superstructure was designed for a 100-year lifespan, with key materials imported from Japan under Japanese Industrial Standards (JIS).

The project was managed by the Thăng Long Project Management Unit under the Vietnamese Ministry of Transport, with the Obayashi–Sumitomo Mitsui joint venture serving as the main contractor. Technical consulting and supervision were provided by Pacific Consultants International (Japan), ensuring adherence to international bridge construction standards.
