= Tang Long =

Tang Long or Tang Lung may refer to:

- Tang Long (Water Margin), a fictional character in the Water Margin.
- Tang Lung, a character played by Bruce Lee in the film Way of the Dragon.
- Tang Long, a character played by Donnie Yen in the film Dragon.
- The TangLong, a 3x3x3 twisty puzzle cube model made by MoYu.
- Thang Long, a brand of Vietnamese cigarettes.
