= Thăng Long Bridge =

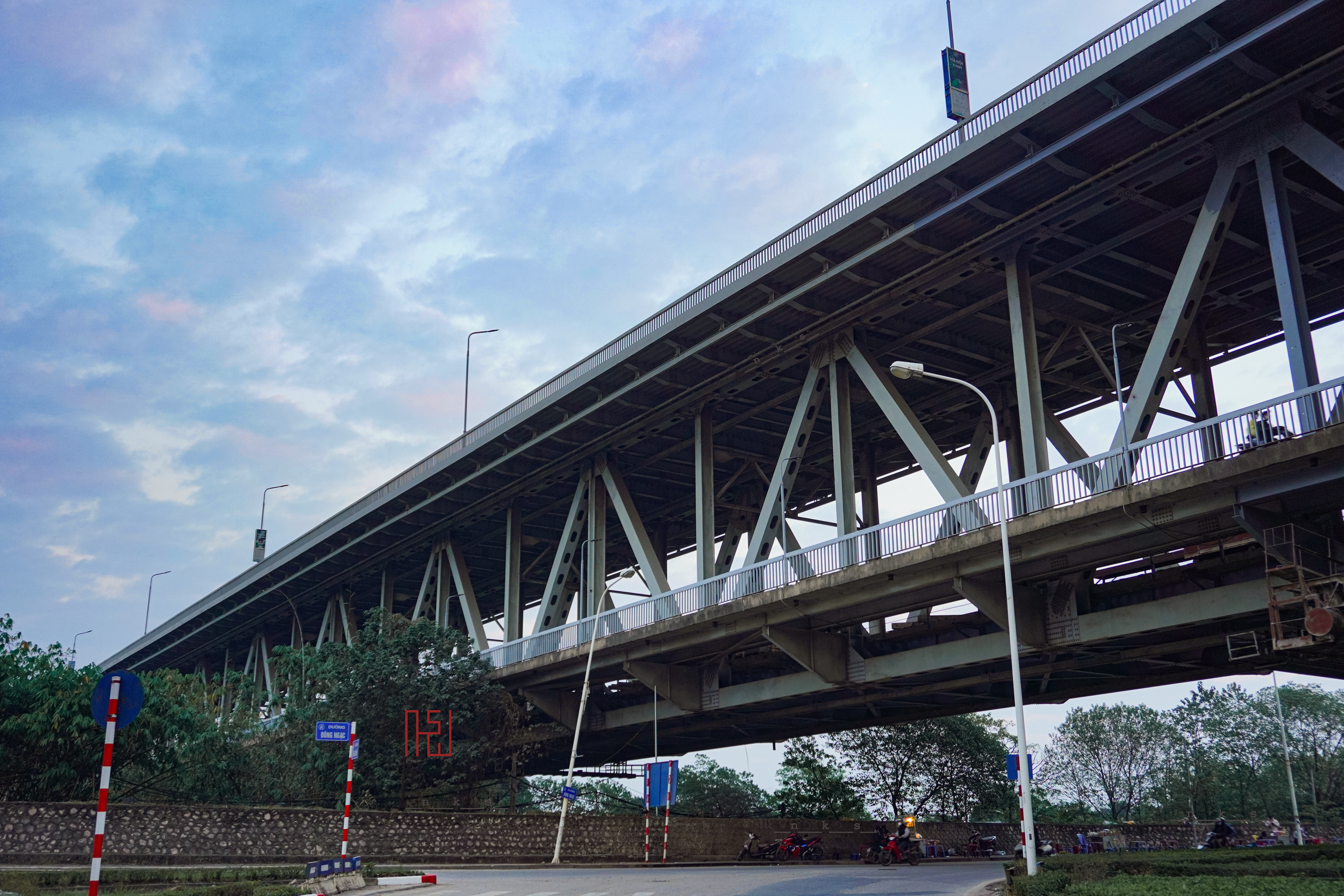
- Thăng Long Bridge viewed from Đông Ngạc road
- Coordinates: 21°06′N 105°47′E
- Crosses: Red River
- Locale: Bắc Từ Liêm – Đông Anh, Hanoi

Characteristics
- Design: Steel structure for main span; reinforced concrete girders for approach spans
- Material: Steel and Concrete
- Total length: Varies by transport type: 5,503.3 m (rail); 3,116 m (road); 2,658.42 m (light vehicles)
- Width: 21 m

History
- Constructed by: Soviet Union (initial phase involved China)
- Construction start: November 26, 1974
- Opened: May 9, 1985

Statistics
- Daily traffic: AH14

Location
- Interactive map of Thăng Long Bridge

The Thăng Long Bridge (Cầu Thăng Long, completed 1978) is a two-level crossing over the Red River in northern Hanoi. It forms a key segment of Ringway 3 of Hanoi, connecting the city center with Noi Bai International Airport and provinces in the northwest of Vietnam. The bridge stands as a lasting tribute to Soviet–Vietnamese cooperation, a role reflected in its alternative name “Friendship Bridge” and memorial features at both ends.

== History ==
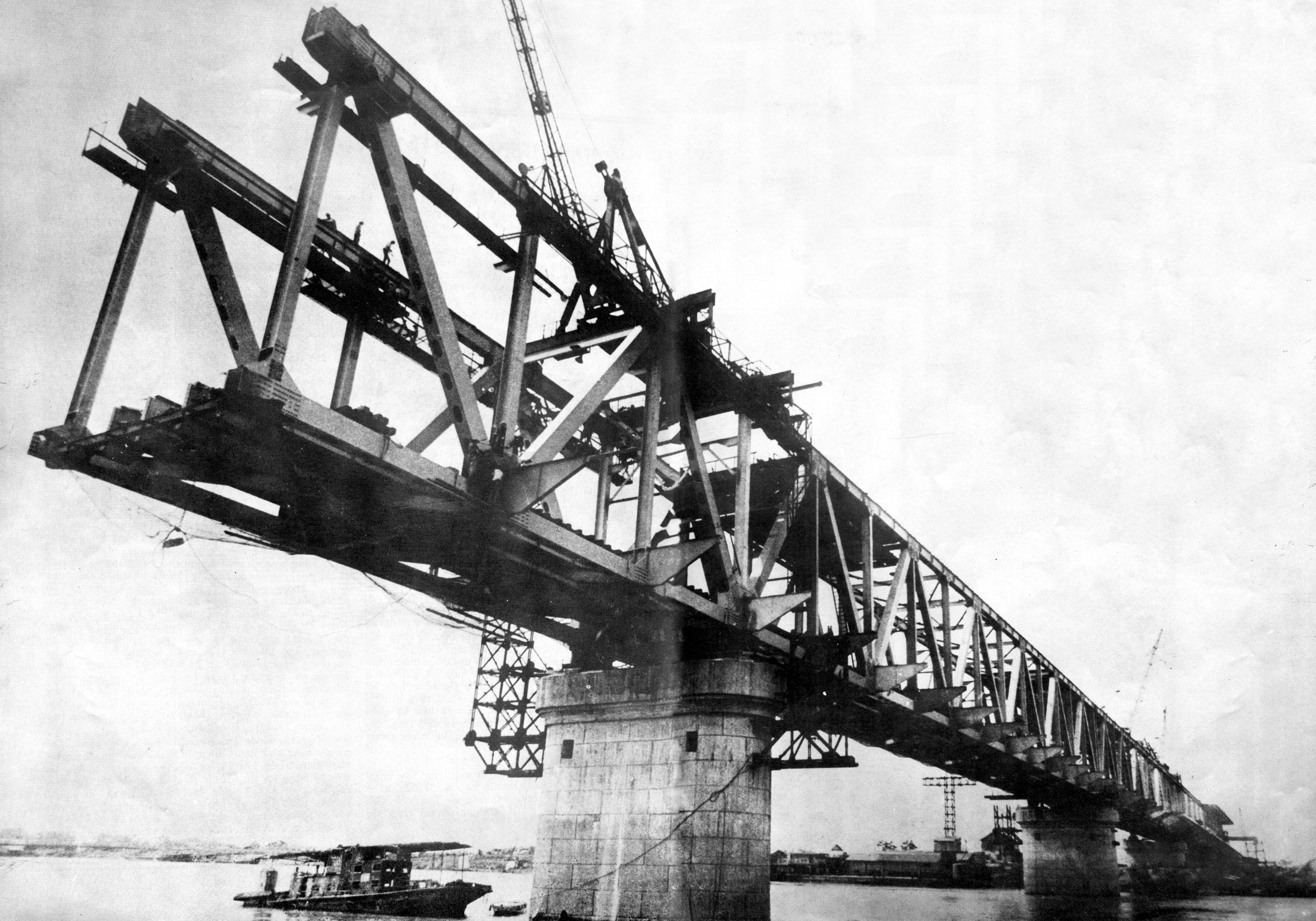
Thăng Long bridge during construction

Work on Thăng Long Bridge began on 26 November 1974 under a Chinese-supported design, but halted in 1978 when Chinese aid was withdrawn. At that time, the structure was only ≈20% complete. In June 1979, the Soviet Union resumed the project under an Vietnam–Soviet agreement dated 3 November 1978, supplying materials and expertise. The bridge was completed and inaugurated on 9 May 1985, after nearly 11 years of construction.

== Technical specifications ==
The Thăng Long Bridge is a two-level structure designed for both railway and roadway traffic. Its superstructure consists of steel girders for the main spans and prestressed reinforced concrete girders for the approach spans.

=== Load design ===
- Railway load: Designed for a C12-class train.
- Motor vehicle load: Designed for H30–HK80 vehicle convoys.
- Light vehicle/bicycle lanes: Uniform load of 400 kg/m² or a single 13-ton vehicle.
- Pedestrian load: 300 kg/m².
- Navigational clearance: Ensures safe passage for 3,000-ton vessels at +11.10 m water level.

=== Structure and dimensions ===
- Main bridge (spanning the Red River):
  - Length: 1,688 m
  - Structure: 15 continuous steel girder spans
  - Each girder unit: 3 spans × 112 m
  - Supported by 14 piers and 2 abutments, each pier containing ~10,000 m³ of concrete
  - Total: 5 continuous girder units
- Lower deck – Railway
  - Total length: 5,503.3 m
  - Deck width: 17 m
  - Rail: Two tracks – one standard gauge (1.435 m), one meter gauge (1.0 m)
  - Each side includes a 3.5 m lane for light vehicles
  - Vertical clearance from upper to lower deck: 14.10 m
  - Approach spans: 116 prestressed concrete girders, each 33 m long (53 north, 63 south)
- Upper deck – Roadway
  - Total length: 3,116 m
  - Deck width: 19.5 m, including:
    - 16.5 m for four lanes of vehicles
    - Two sidewalks, each 1.5 m wide
  - Superstructure: 6,500 tons of orthotropic steel plates, 14 mm thick
  - Reinforced with longitudinal and transverse stiffeners
  - Welds: Over 30 km of automated welds inspected via ultrasonic and X-ray testing (first used in Vietnam)
  - Approach spans: 43 prestressed concrete girders, 33 m each (22 north, 21 south)
- Light vehicle access
  - Total length: 2,658.42 m
  - Includes 29 additional approach spans (14 north, 15 south) and side lanes on lower deck

=== Materials and construction ===
- Concrete volume: 230,000 m³
- Structural steel: 53,294 tons
- Precast girders: 946 units, each weighing 54–130 tons
- Prestressed spun piles: 110,000 m of Ø550 mm piles

=== Technical upgrades and usage ===
In 2009, the bridge underwent a major refurbishment phase, including the replacement of expansion joints, repainting, and application of ultra-high-performance concrete overlays.

A subsequent major repair completed in 2021 included reinforcement of the steel deck and structural elements, costing about VND 270 billion (~US$11.7 million).
