= Vĩnh Tuy Bridge =

Bridge on Red River in Hanoi, Vietnam

Coordinates: 21.004434°N 105.876219°E

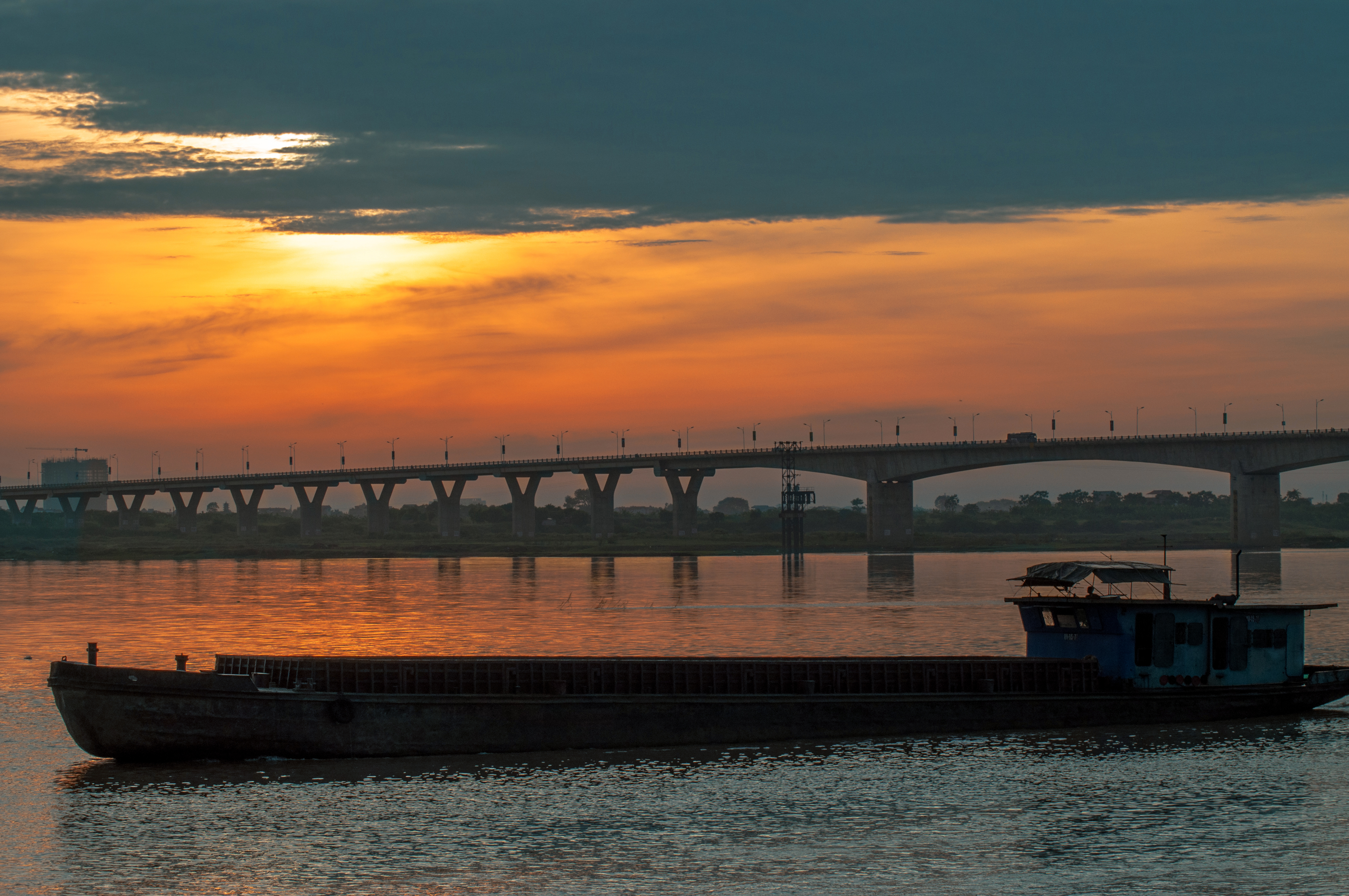
Vĩnh Tuy Bridge

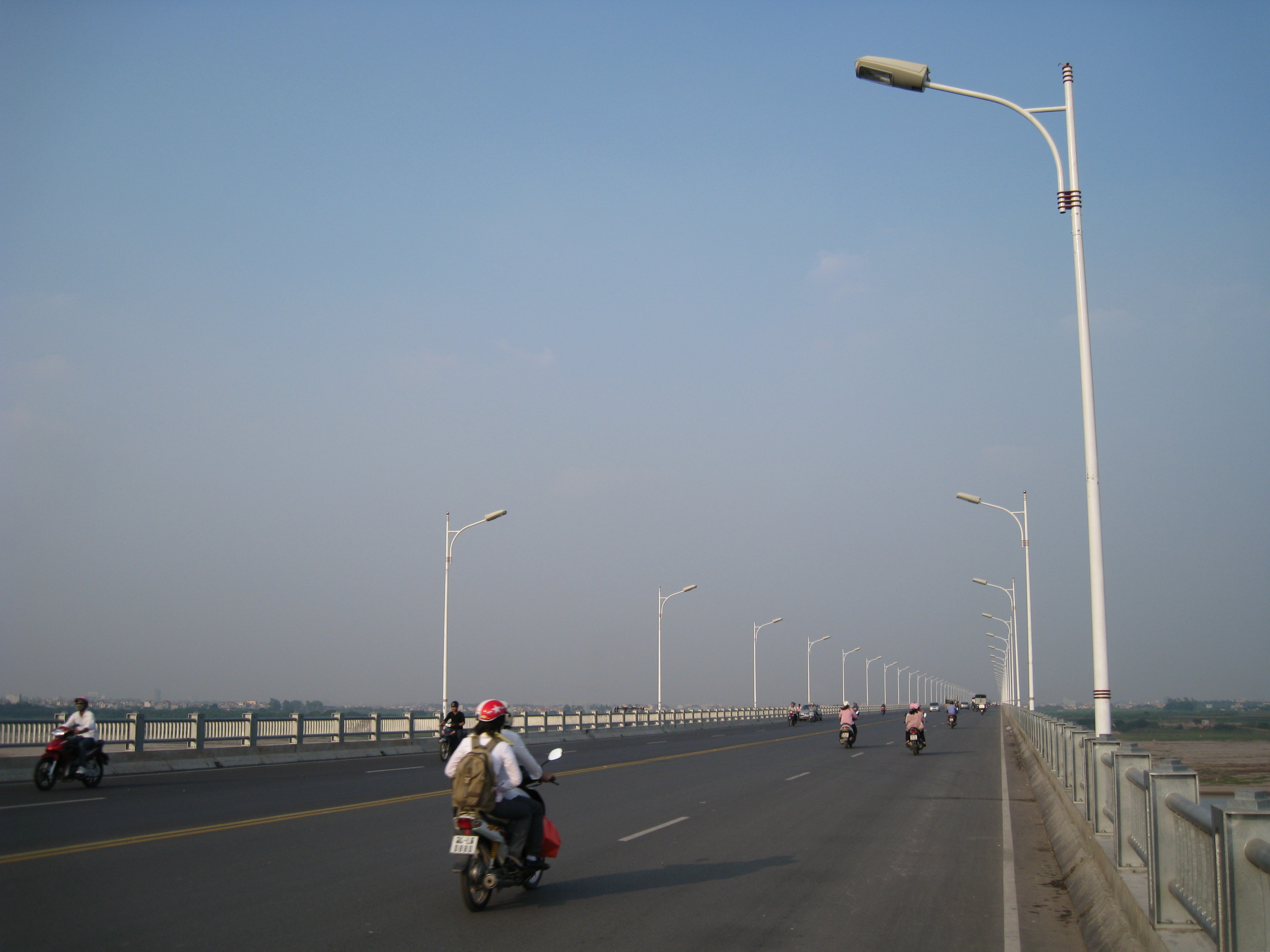
Vĩnh Tuy Bridge

The Vĩnh Tuy Bridge (Vietnamese: Cầu Vĩnh Tuy) is a bridge over the Red River (Vietnamese: Sông Hồng) in Hanoi. It was one of the Millennial Anniversary of Hanoi commemorative projects, along with the Thanh Trì Bridge.

The bridge's first phase was completed in September 2009. The second phase, essentially a second identical bridge running parallel to the original, was constructed between January 2021 and August 2023; expanding the bridge from four to eight car lanes. Each bridge now serves its own traffic direction, alleviating congestion and accident risk caused by the original bridge having to share two-way traffic without hard lane dividers.

It is unrelated to a smaller Vĩnh Tuy bridge near Điện Biên Phủ, destroyed in 1966 by United States Air Force bombing.
