= Chương Dương Bridge =

Bridge in Hanoi, Vietnam

Coordinates: 21.038024°N 105.86125°E

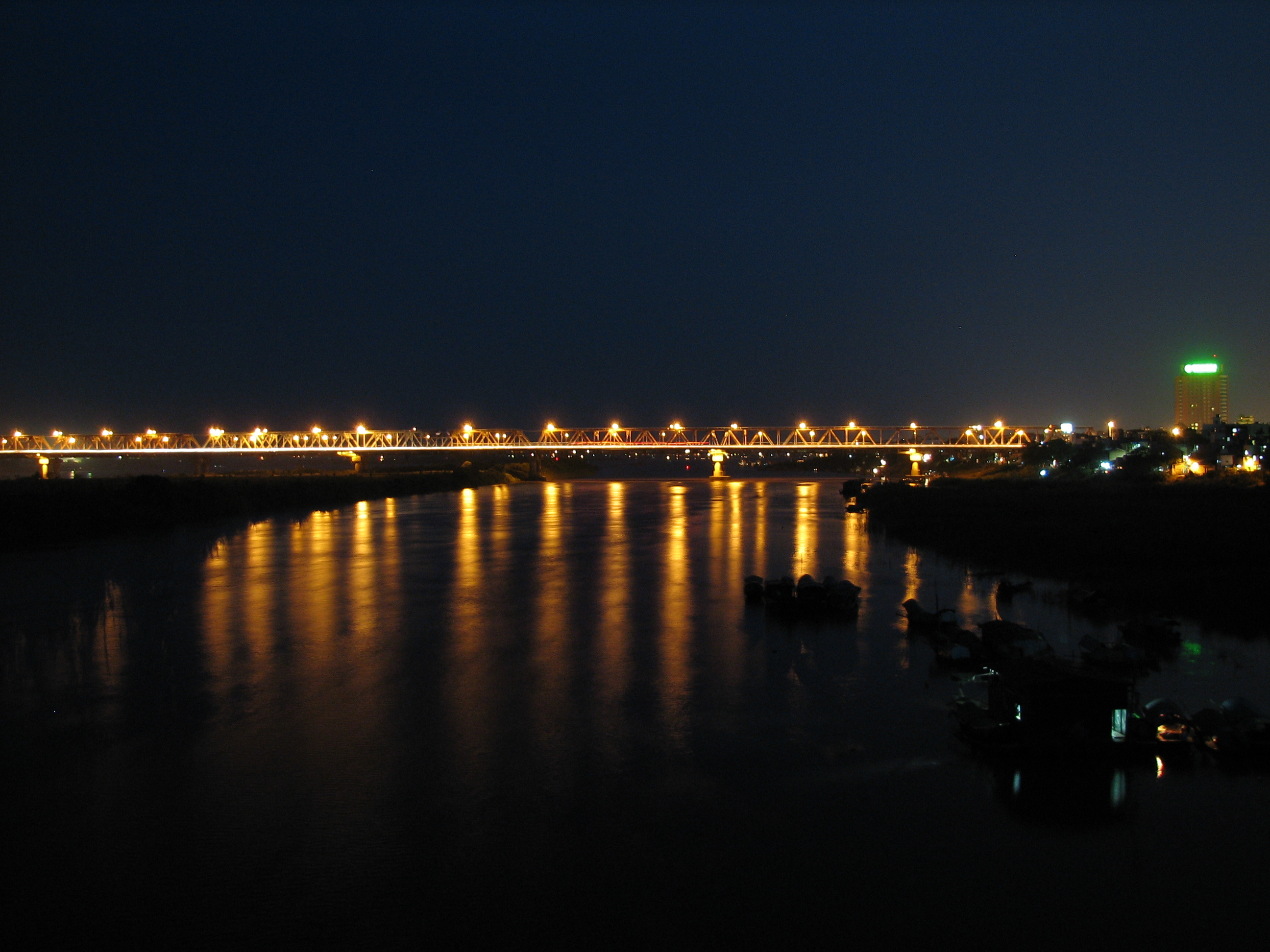
Chương Dương Bridge at night

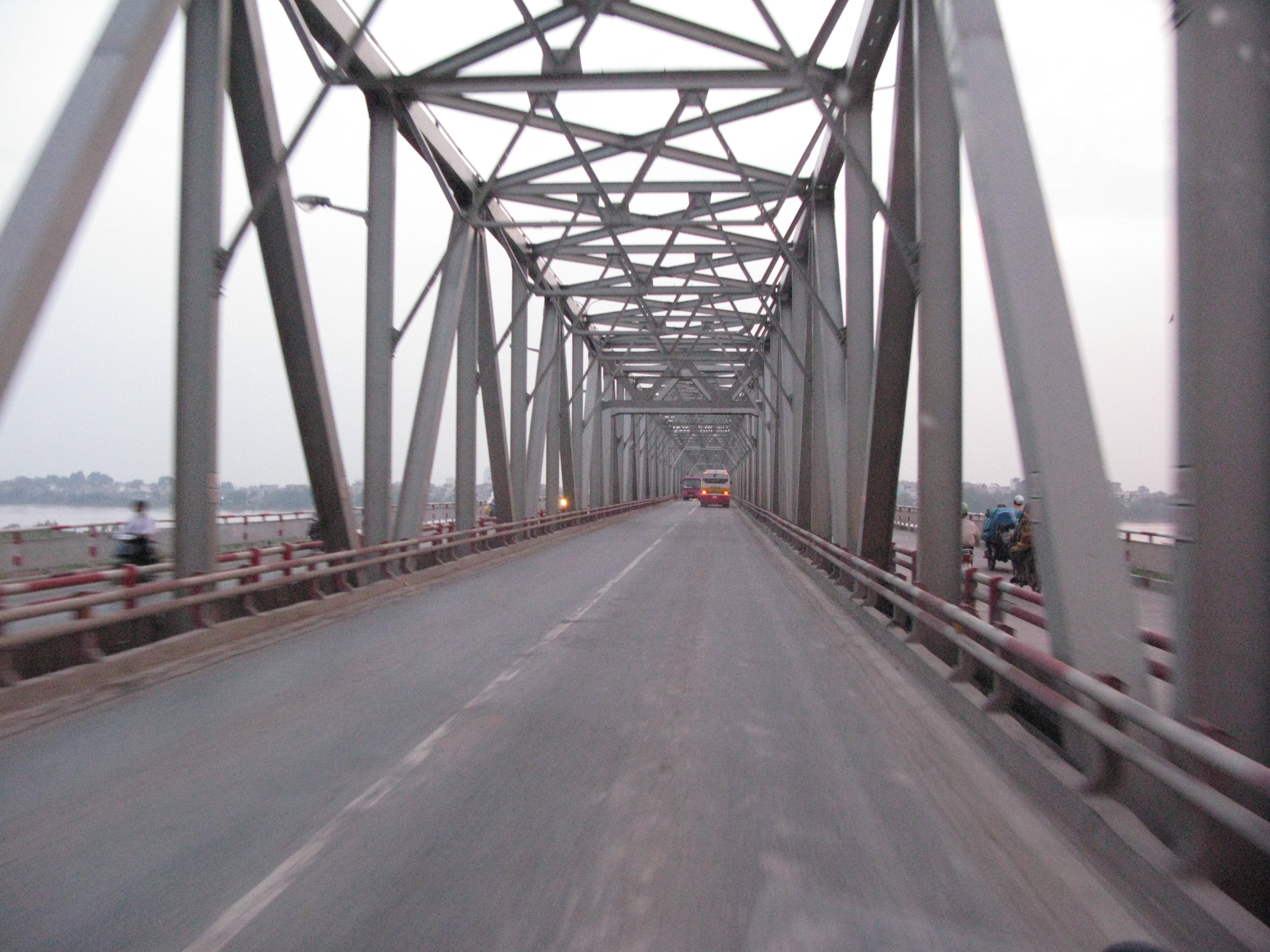
Chương Dương Bridge by day

The Chương Dương Bridge (Vietnamese: Cầu Chương Dương, completed 1985) is a major river road bridge in Hanoi, Vietnam. It is 1,213 meters long and has 2 lanes in each direction for vehicles up to 80 tons.
