= List of museums in Vietnam =

This is a list of museums in Vietnam.

== Museums ==
- Precious Heritage Art Gallery Museum
- Can Tho Museum
- Museum of Cham Sculpture
- Hanoi Contemporary Arts Centre
- Hanoi Hilton
- Hanoi Museum
- Museum of Ho Chi Minh City
- Ho Chi Minh Museum
- Vietnam Press Museum
- Hue Museum of Royal Fine Arts
- National Museum of Vietnamese History
- Museum of Vietnamese History
- Nam Định Textile Museum
- Nhatranglive
- Museum of Sa Huynh Culture
- Museum of Trade Ceramics
- Vietnam People's Air Force Museum, Hanoi
- Vietnam People's Air Force Museum, Ho Chi Minh City
- Vietnam Museum of Ethnology
- Vietnam National Museum of Fine Arts
- Vietnam National Museum of Nature in Hanoi (Bảo tàng thiên nhiên Việt Nam)
- Vietnam Military History Museum
- Vietnam Museum of Revolution
- Vietnamese Women's Museum
- War Remnants Museum
- Museum of Worldwide Arms
- Yersin Museum
- Dak Lak Museum

== See also ==
- List of war museums and monuments in Vietnam
- List of museums
- Tourism in Vietnam
- Culture of Vietnam
