= List of Vietnam War monuments and memorials =

This is a list of monuments and other memorials to the Vietnam War.

== Australia ==
- Vietnam Forces National Memorial, Canberra
- Beaudesert War Memorial
- Cairns War Memorial
- Esk War Memorial
- Gair Park
- Gympie Memorial Park
- Sandgate War Memorial Park
- Strathpine Honour Board
- Tieri War Memorial
- Toogoolawah War Memorial
- Traveston Powder Magazine
- Warwick War Memorial
- Weeping Mother Memorial
- World War I Cenotaph, Mackay
- Yeppoon War Memorial
- Yeronga Memorial Park
- Long Tan Cross (original, in Canberra)
- Torrens Parade Ground, Adelaide, South Australia
- Vietnam War Comradeship Memorial, Cabravale Park, Cabramatta, New South Wales

== Canada ==
- The North Wall, Windsor, Ontario

== Vietnam ==
- Vietnam War Memorial, Hanoi
- Bến Dược Memorial Temple, Ho Chi Minh City
- Đồng Lộc Junction
- Embassy of the United States, Saigon
- Long Tan Cross (replica on original site)
- Trường Sơn Cemetery
- Vịnh Mốc tunnels

== United States ==
- Augusta-CSRA Vietnam War Veterans Memorial, Augusta, Georgia
- Charlestown Vietnam Veterans Memorial, Boston, Massachusetts
- Inland Northwest Vietnam Veterans Memorial, Riverfront Park, Spokane, Washington
- Kentucky Vietnam Veterans Memorial, Frankfort, Kentucky
- National Japanese American Veterans Memorial Court, Los Angeles, California
- Nebraska Vietnam Veterans Memorial, Papillion, Nebraska
- New Jersey Vietnam Veterans' Memorial, Holmdel, New Jersey
- Oregon Vietnam Veterans Memorial, Portland, Oregon
- Vietnam Memorial, Austin, Texas
- Vietnam Memorial of Los Angeles County, Grand Park, Los Angeles, California
- Vietnam Veterans Memorial (The Wall-USA), online
- Vietnam Veterans Memorial, Wesley Bolin Memorial Plaza, Phoenix, Arizona
- Vietnam Veterans Memorial, Chicago, Illinois
- Vietnam Veterans Memorial, Angel Fire, New Mexico
- Vietnam Veterans Memorial, Olympia, Washington
- Vietnam Veterans Memorial, Washington, D.C.
- Vietnam Veterans Memorial Bridge, Baltimore, Maryland
- Vietnam Veterans Memorial Bridge, Ohio River
- Vietnam Veterans Memorial Bridge, Richmond, Virginia
- Vietnam Veterans' Memorial Park, Museum of Flight, Seattle, Washington
- Vietnam Veterans Plaza, Manhattan, New York
- Vietnam Veterans Replica Wall Memorial, Tupelo, Mississippi
- Vietnam Wall of Southwest Florida, Punta Gorda, Florida
- Vietnam War Memorial, Westminster, California
- Vietnam War Memorial, Indianapolis, Indiana
- Vietnam War Memorial, Milwaukie, Oregon
- Vietnam War Memorial, Houston, Texas
- Vietnam Women's Memorial, Washington, D.C.
- The Virtual Wall, online

== See also ==
- List of war museums and monuments in Vietnam
- List of Korean War memorials
- List of Confederate monuments and memorials
- List of Union Civil War monuments and memorials
