= List of war museums and monuments in Vietnam =

There are numerous war museums, memorials and monuments in Vietnam, this page presents a partial list of museums and monuments located in Vietnam relating to the First Indochina War and the Second Indochina War. This list is organized by location.

== An Khe Pass ==
A stone monument on Hill 638 (Cây Rui), near An Khê Pass and National Route 19, commemorates the Battle of An Khe Pass in April 1972. Erected by the South Korean Fierce Tiger Division, the monument bears Korean inscriptions reading "Victory Monument" (전승비), together with a dedication to South Korean soldiers killed in the battle. A second monument erected by the division beside Route 19 in September 1972 was subsequently demolished.

== Ap Bac ==
A small museum in the hamlet of Ap Bac (10°26′17.23″N 106°11′45.42″E) commemorates the Battle of Ap Bac in January 1963. A monument shows Viet Cong forces shooting down helicopters and destroying armoured vehicles. Items on display include an M101 howitzer, M113 armoured personnel carrier and a Bell UH-1H Huey.

== Ben Hai river ==
A peace and unification monument stands on the north side of the Ben Hai River which formed the eastern end of the Vietnamese Demilitarized Zone.

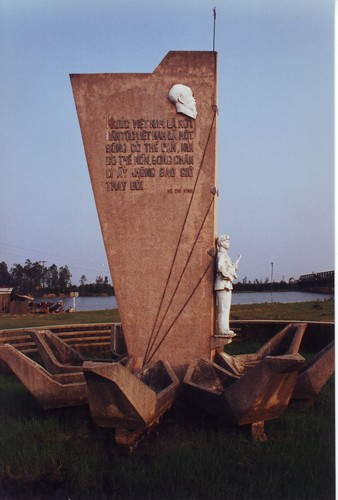
Unification monument

== Bien Hoa ==
- A monument on Highway 1 adjacent to the main gate for Bien Hoa Air Base commemorates the People's Army of Vietnam seizing of the Air Base on 25 April 1975.
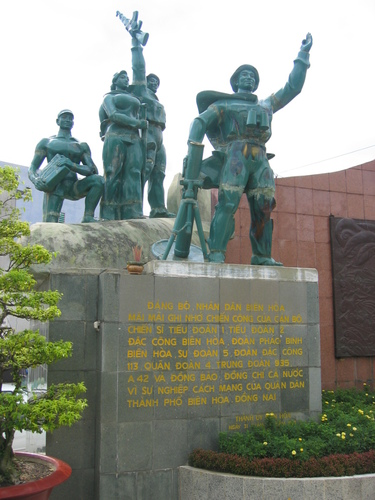
PAVN victory monument at the Bien Hoa
- The Bien Hoa Museum is located on Highway 1, adjacent to the Bien Hoa Air Base. Items on display include a 57 mm AZP S-60 antiaircraft gun, M1939 37mm antiaircraft gun, M-46 130mm cannon, M113 armoured personnel carrier, MiG-21, T-59 tank and Bell UH-1H Huey.
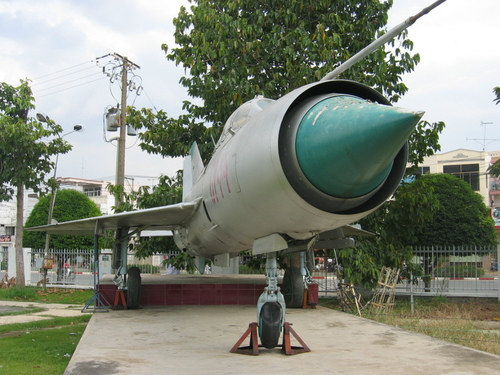
MiG-21 at the Bien Hoa Museum

== Camp Carroll ==
- Camp Carroll

== Côn Sơn Island ==
- Côn Sơn Island

== Cu Chi ==
- Củ Chi tunnels

== Dak To ==
In the middle of town is a war memorial commemorating the capture of Dak To on 24 April 1972 during the Easter Offensive, together with a T-54 tank and a ZSU-57-2 anti-aircraft gun.

== Danang ==
- Zone 5 Military Museum, Danang

== Dien Bien Phu ==
Monuments are located on all major sites of the Battle of Dien Bien Phu, including:

- The bunker of General Christian de Castries.
- Military museum with assorted weaponry used by the French colonial forces and the Viet Minh.
- The French hill strongpoints all have Viet Minh monuments.
- French memorial to approximately 10,000 French colonial troops who died in the battle and in captivity
- Two large Viet Minh cemeteries, one in the center of town adjacent to strongpoint Eliane 2 and the other north of the town adjacent to strongpoint Gabrielle
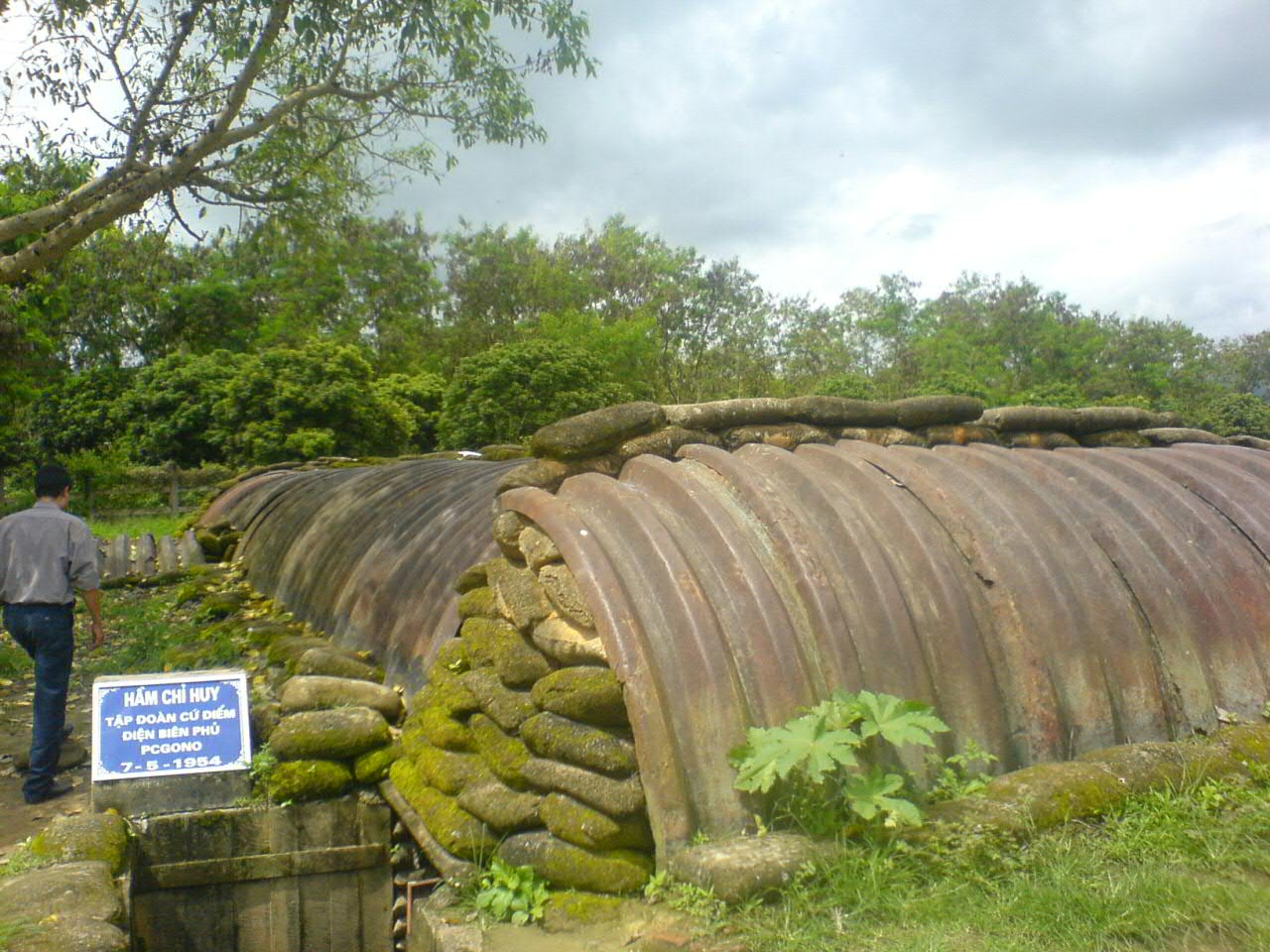
de Castries' bunker, PC GONO

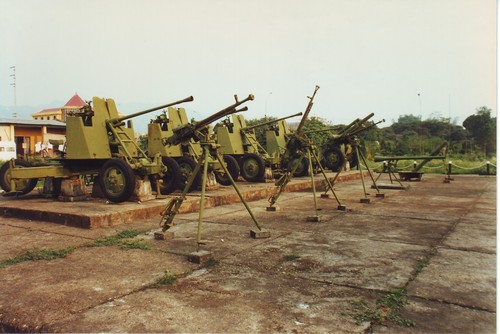
Viet Minh AAA artillery at the Dien Bien Phu Museum

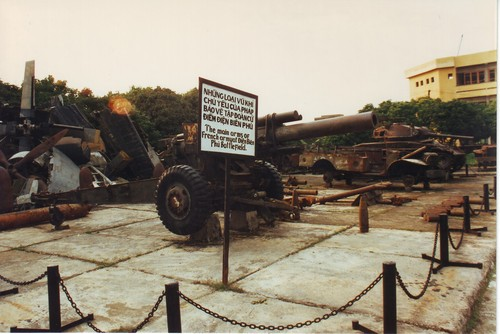
Captured French artillery at the Dien Bien Phu Museum

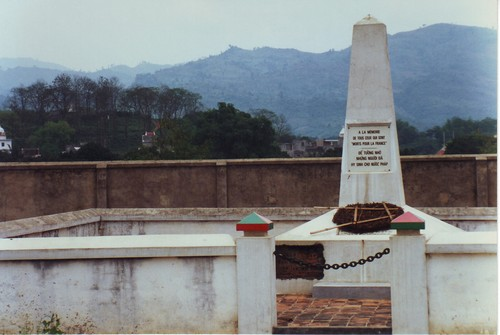
French memorial

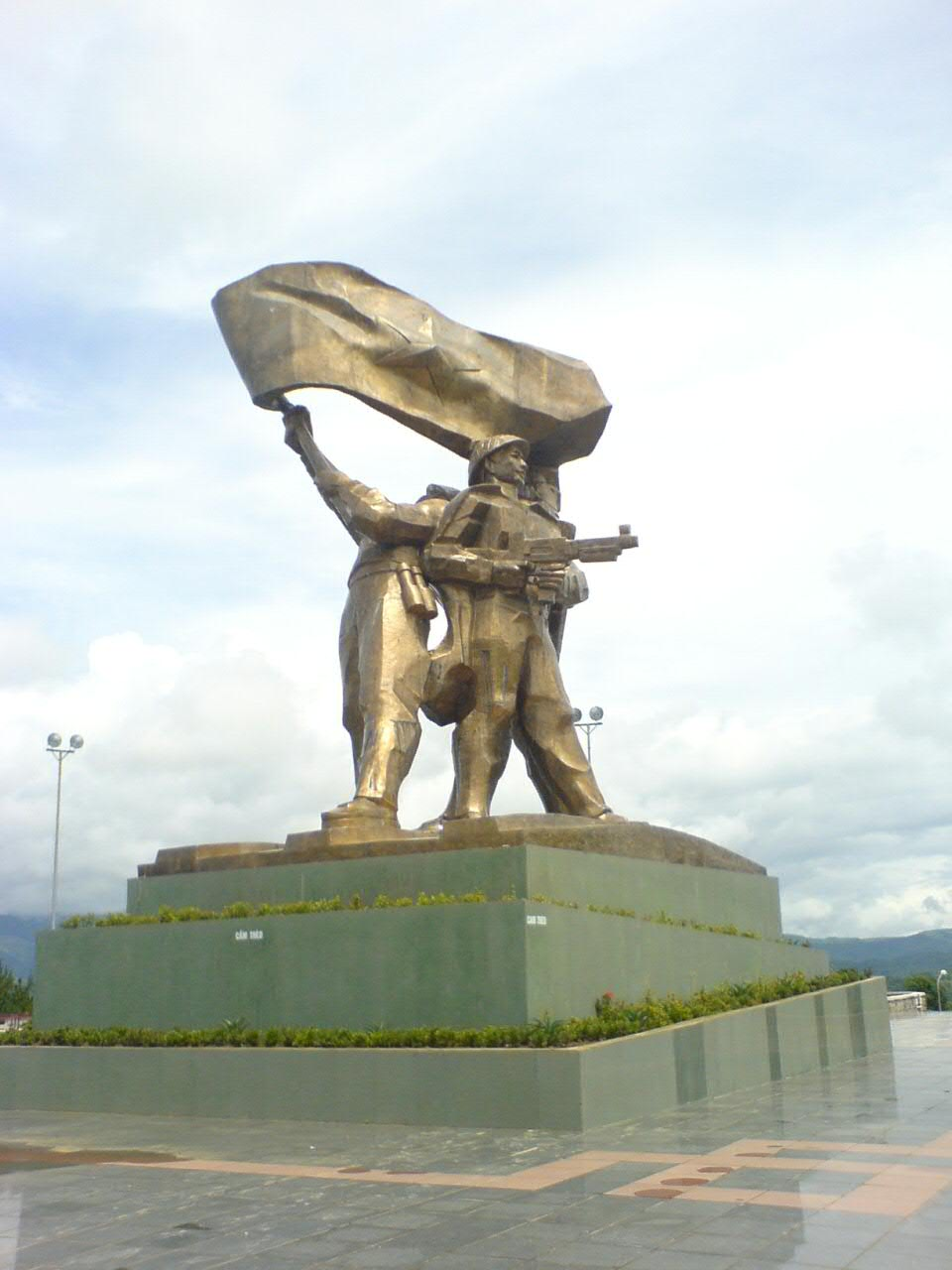
Viet Minh memorial

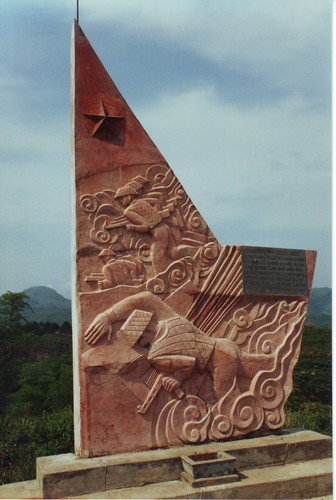
Viet Minh memorial on Strongpoint Beatrice

== Hanoi ==
- "B-52 lake", Hồ B-52 or May Bay B52 is located just south of the West Lake along Hoang Hoa Tham Rd, more a rather large pond it contains wreckage of a Boeing B-52 Stratofortress shot down on 27 December 1972 during Operation Linebacker II
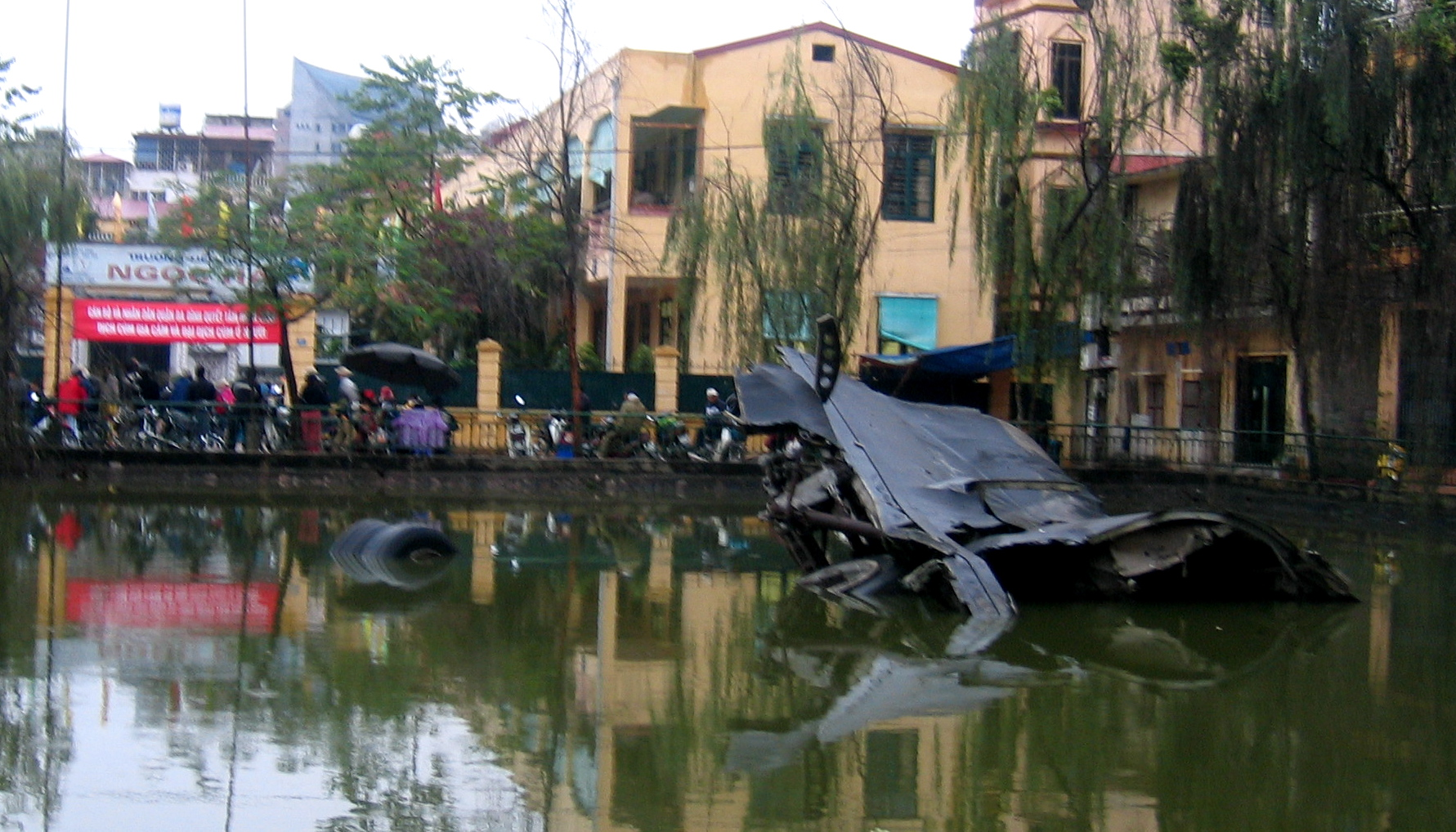
B-52 Lake
- B-52 Victory Museum, Hanoi
- Hanoi Hilton
- Vietnam Military History Museum
- Vietnamese People's Air Force Museum, Hanoi
- Vietnam War Memorial, Hanoi

== Hội An ==
- A large PAVN cemetery is located on Le Hong Phong just north of Hội An.
- A PAVN cemetery is located on Nguyen Hoang (15°56′1.85″N 108°13′44.01″E), north of Hoi An.
- The Hội An Museum has several rooms featuring the history of Hội An during the First Indochina War and the Vietnam War

== Huế ==
The Huế War Museum (Bảo tàng Cách mạng Thừa Thiên Huế) is located on Hai Mươi Ba Tháng Tám, inside the Citadel. Items on display include an M42 Duster, M48 Patton tank, M88 Recovery Vehicle, M113 armoured personnel carrier, Cadillac Gage V-100 Commando armoured car and M107 Self-Propelled Gun. Inside the museum are various small arms and the PAVN version of the Battle of Huế, the Massacre at Huế is not mentioned.

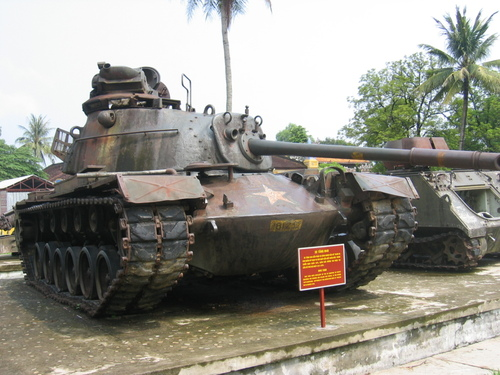
M-48 and M-113 at the Hue Museum

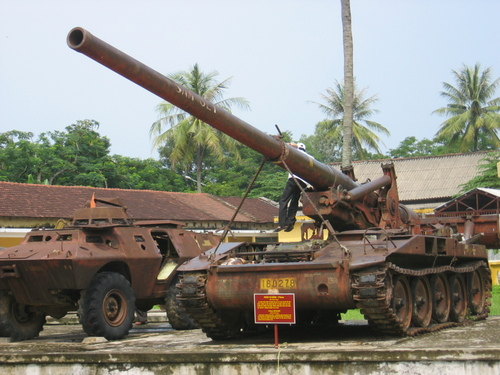
M-107 and V-100 at the Hue Museum

== Khe Sanh ==
There is a small museum on the site of the old Khe Sanh Combat Base. Items on display include a Bell UH-1H Huey, Boeing CH-47 Chinook, M41 Walker Bulldog tank and artillery pieces. On display in the museum are various small arms together with photos from the battles around Khe Sanh and also Operation Lam Son 719.

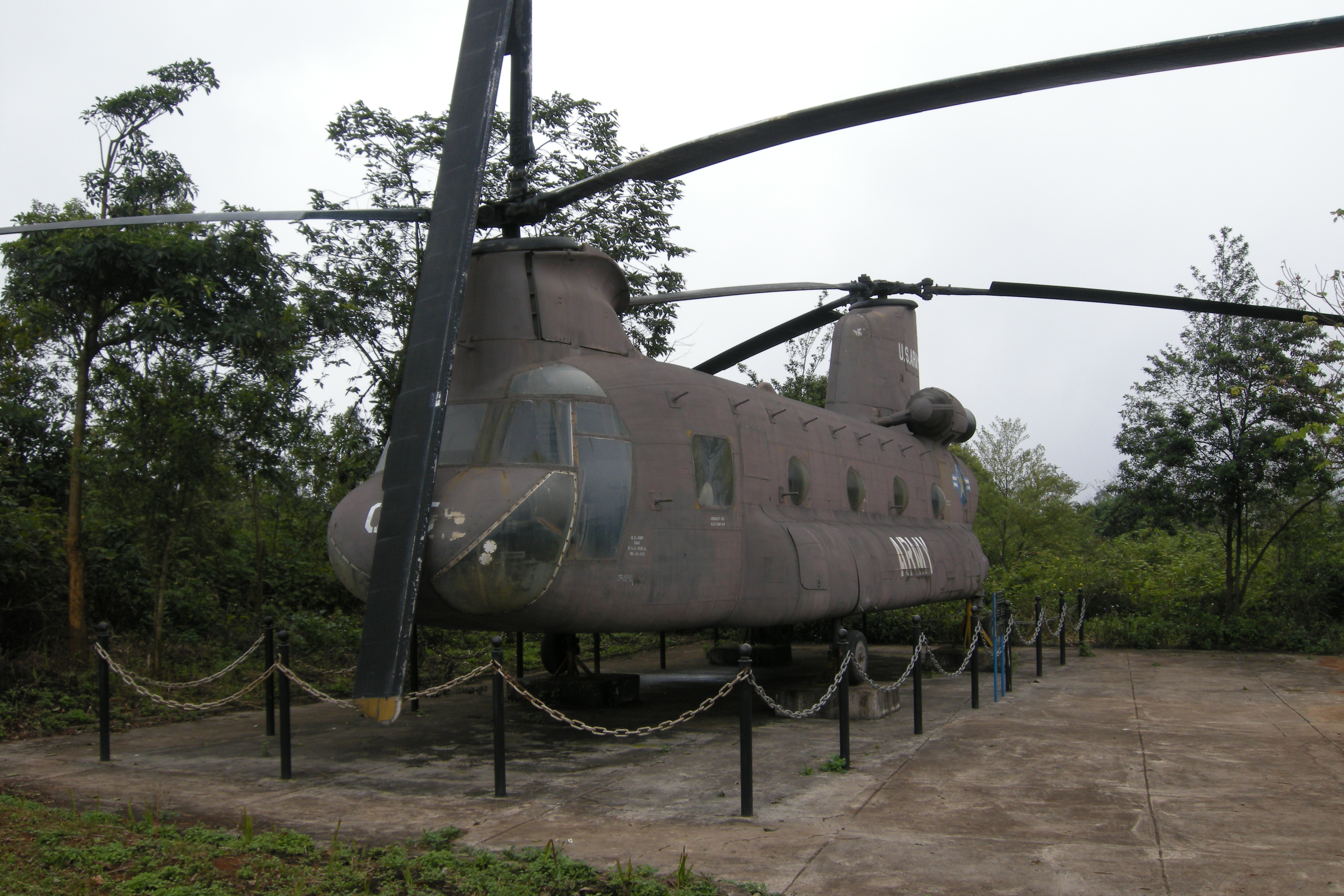
CH-47 Chinook helicopter at Khe Sanh.

== Lang Vei ==
A PT-76 light amphibious tank sits on a pedestal adjacent to Highway 9 to commemorate the PAVN victory in the Battle of Lang Vei.

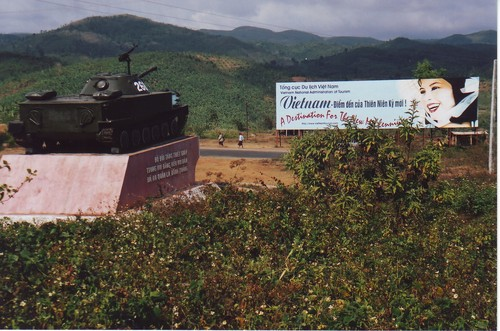
PT-76 memorial at Lang Vei

== Long Binh/ Thu Duc ==
- A large PAVN cemetery is located on Highway 1 between Saigon and Bien Hoa (10°58′37″N 106°49′06″E). It contains the graves of PAVN soldiers killed during the Ho Chi Minh Campaign and during the Cambodian–Vietnamese War.
- Bình An Cemetery, the former ARVN National Cemetery (10°53′22″N 106°48′34″E) is located near the PAVN Cemetery.
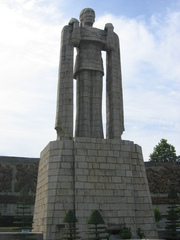
Grieving mother statue at PAVN cemetery

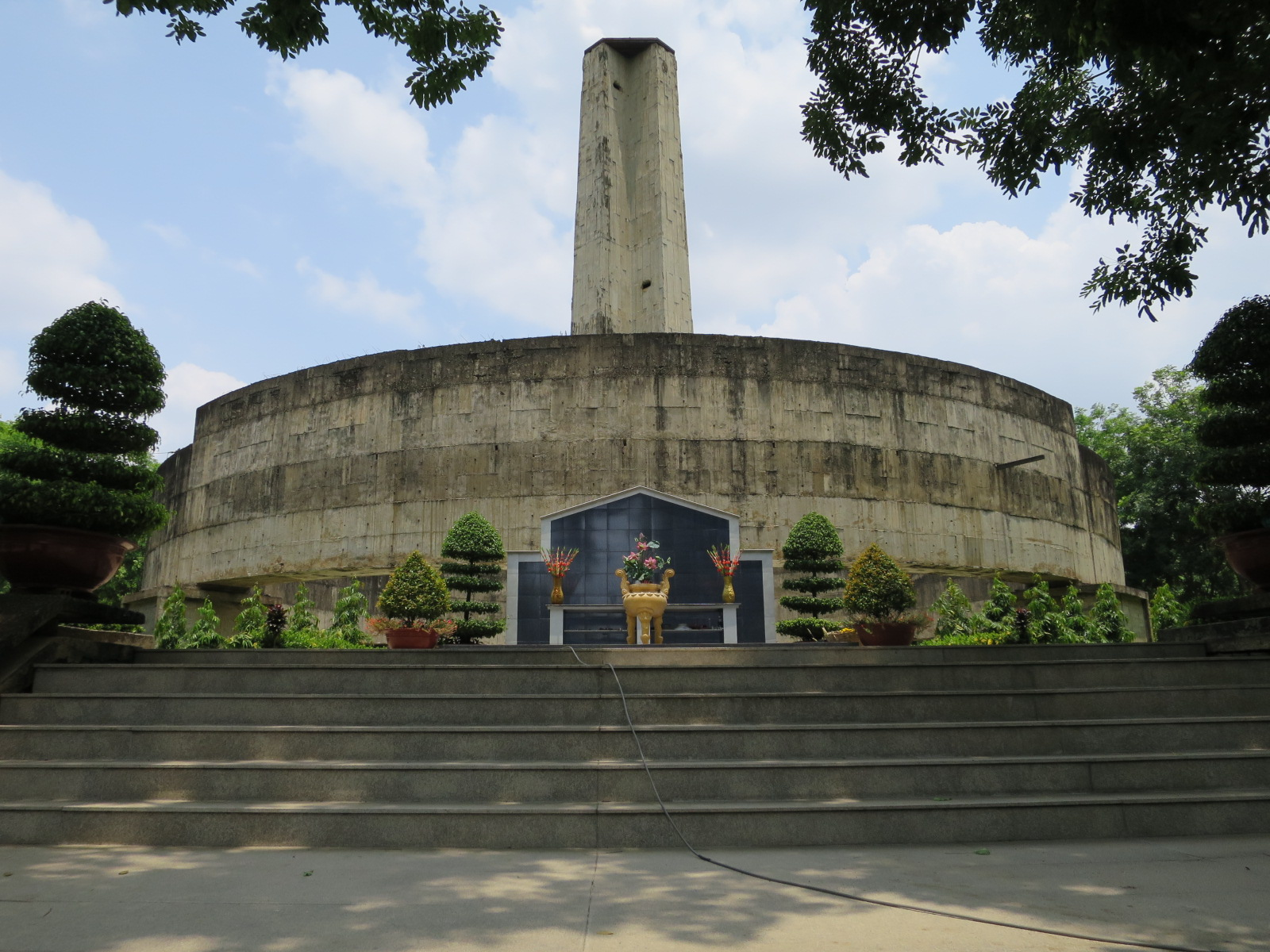
Central monument at the Bình An Cemetery

== Long Tan/Long Thành ==
- A cross in a rubber plantation serves as a memorial for the Australian and Vietnamese dead in the Battle of Long Tan. This is one of the few memorials to Free World troops in Vietnam as most monuments in South Vietnam were destroyed following the North Vietnamese victory in 1975. The monument is a replica of the original Long Tan Cross, which was erected by Australian forces in 1969.
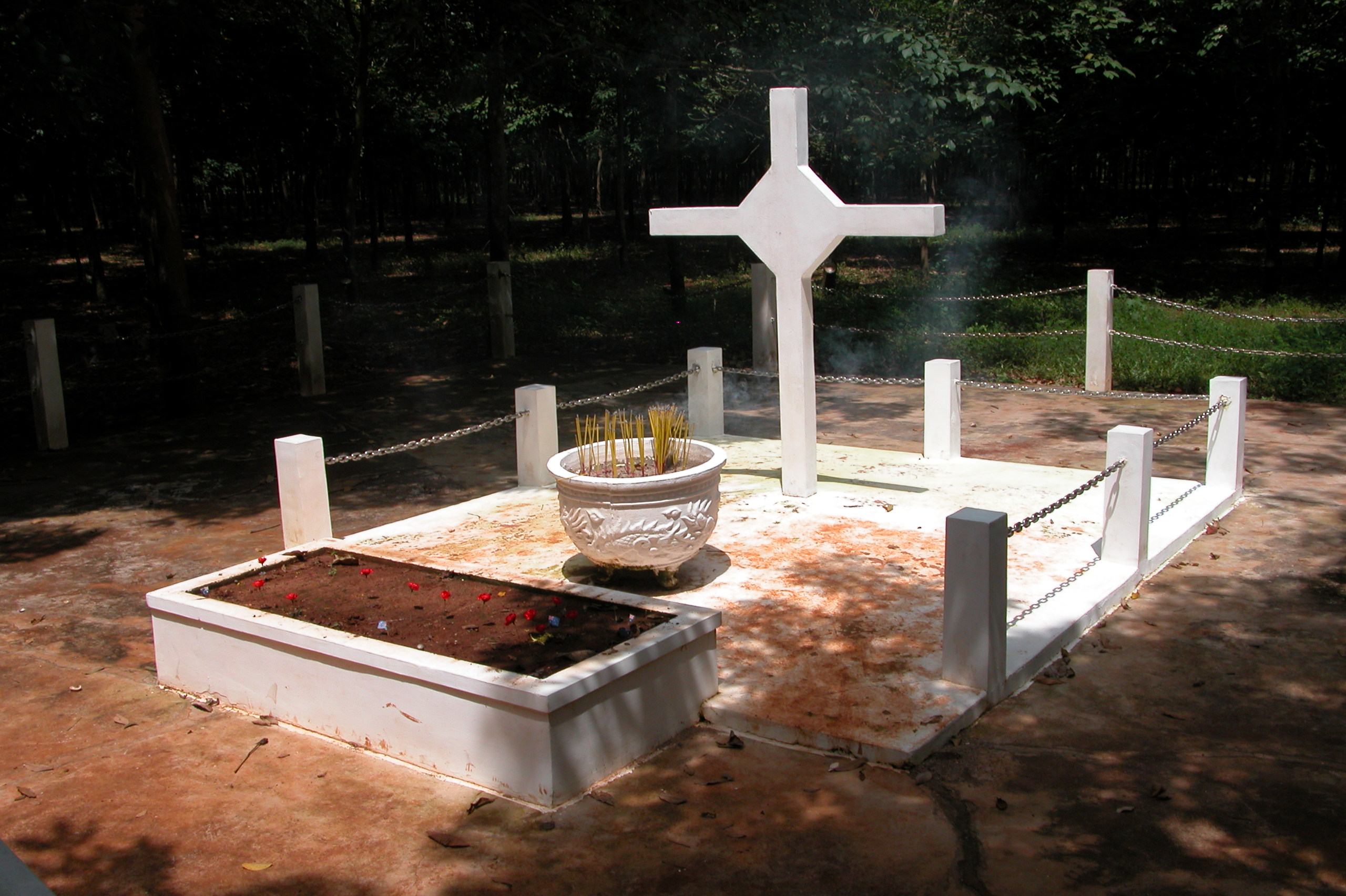
The Long Tan Cross

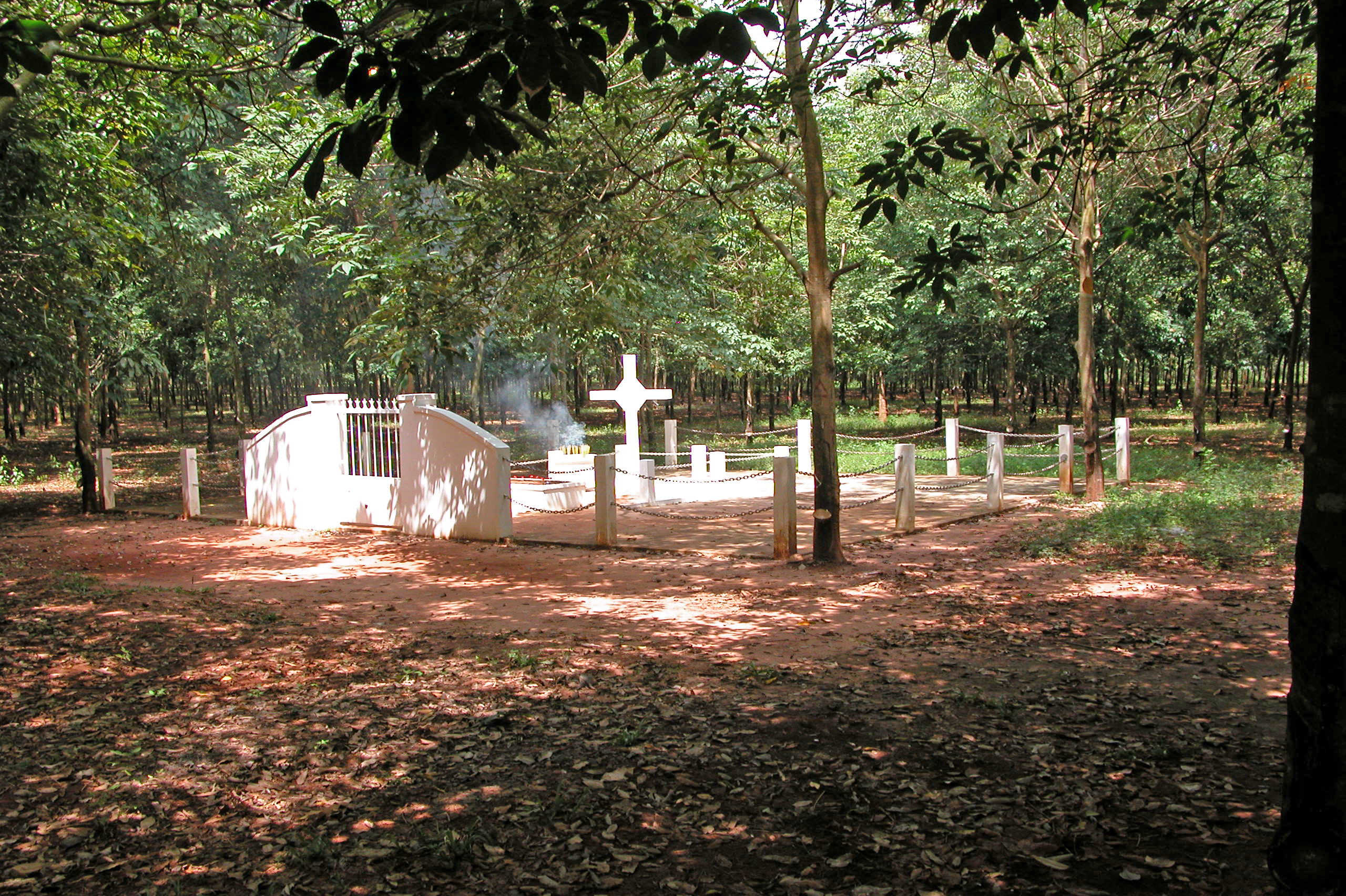
The cross and view of the battlefield
- A PAVN Cemetery is located on Route 51 (10°43′51.60″N 106°59′9.79″E)

== Mang Yang ==
On Route 19 between the villages of An Thanh (west of An Khe) and Ha Ra (east of Pleiku) is the location of the Battle of Mang Yang Pass. A French cemetery is located off Route 19 (14°2′40.44″N 108°26′5.59″E).

== My Tho/Vinh Long ==
Military museum of My Tho. Items on display include an Cessna A-37 Dragonfly, Northrop F-5A Freedom Fighter, M41 Walker Bulldog tank, Bell UH-1H Huey.

== Phan Thiet ==
Military museum is located on Hai Thuong Lan Hong. Items on display include M101 howitzer, M107 Self-Propelled Gun, Bell UH-1H Huey

== Phu Loi ==
The Phu Loi Prison for Viet Minh prisoners and later opponents of the Ngo Dinh Diem government is now a museum.(10°59′27.11″N 106°40′54.08″E). Little remains of the airfield built by the Japanese in the Second World War and subsequently used by U.S. Army aviation units during the Vietnam War.

== Saigon ==
- Ho Chi Minh Campaign Museum is located at 2 Le Duan Boulevard, District 1 in central Saigon. It commemorates the Ho Chi Minh Campaign that led to the fall of South Vietnam. Items on display include a 57 mm AZP S-60 antiaircraft gun, Northrop F-5A Freedom Fighter, M-46 130mm cannon, M113 armoured personnel carrier, S-75 Dvina SA-2 Guideline SAM, T-54 tank, ZIL-157 truck
- Museum of Ho Chi Minh City. Items on display include an Cessna A-37 Dragonfly, Northrop F-5A Freedom Fighter, M41 Walker Bulldog tank, Bell UH-1H Huey.
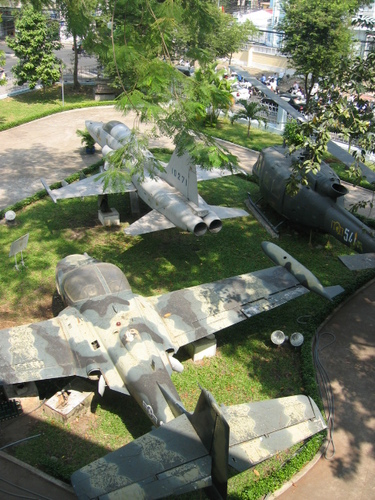
F-5A Freedom Fighter, A-37B Dragonfly and UH-1H Huey at the Museum of Ho Chi Minh City
- Southeastern Armed Forces Museum Military Zone 7
- Reunification Palace
- Former US Embassy, Saigon Tet Offensive memorials. A memorial on Le Duan Boulevard commemorates the members of the Vietcong C-10 Sapper Battalion who blew a hole in the wall of the US Embassy and gained access to the Embassy grounds on the morning of 31 January 1968. Inside the grounds of the now US Consulate is a plaque commemorating the US Marine guard and the 4 MPs who were killed defending the Embassy, the plaque is a replacement for the original which was left at the Embassy during the Fall of Saigon and was subsequently on display at the War Remnants Museum before disappearing.
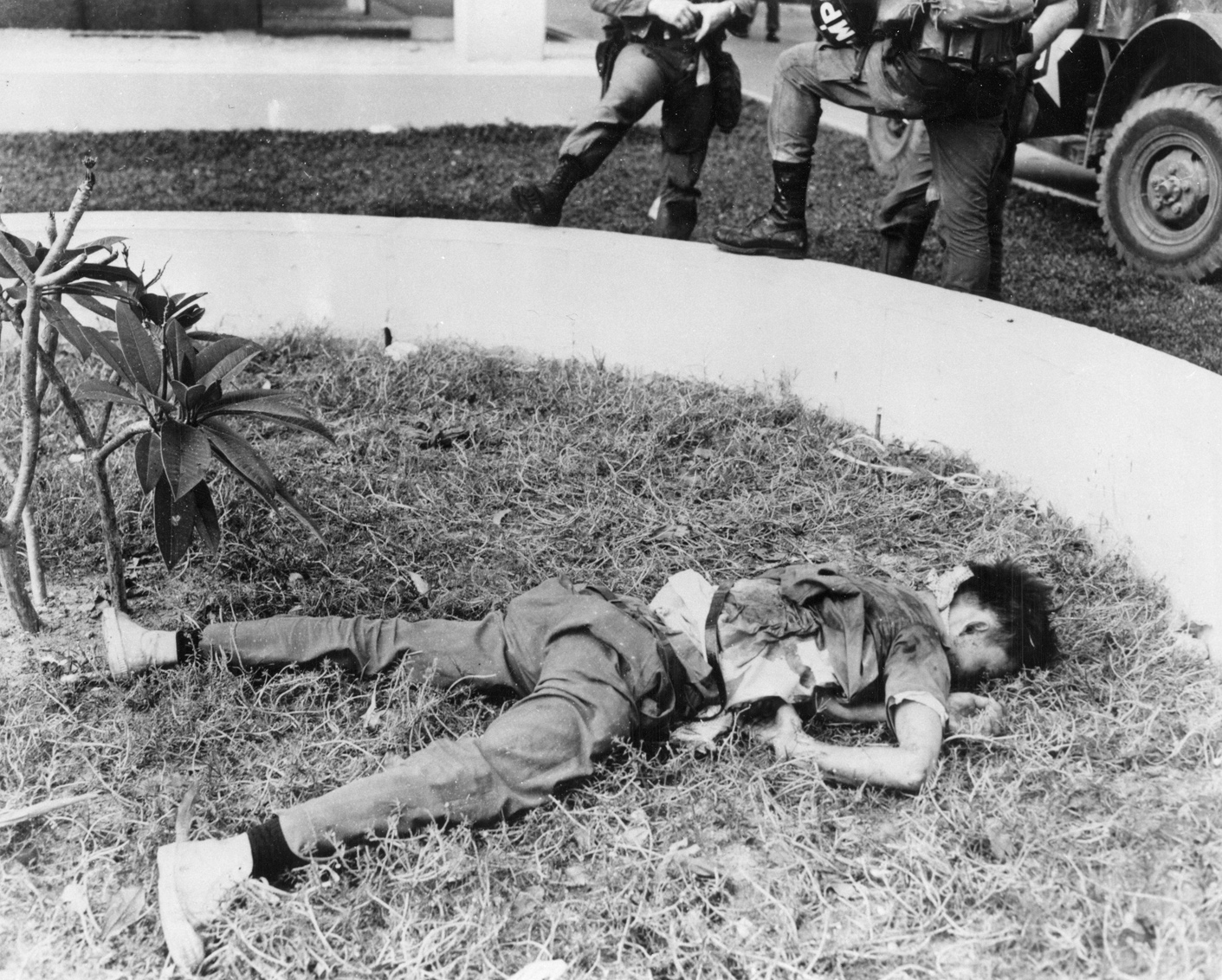
Vietcong sapper lies dead in a planter in the grounds of the U.S. Embassy, Saigon on 31 January 1968

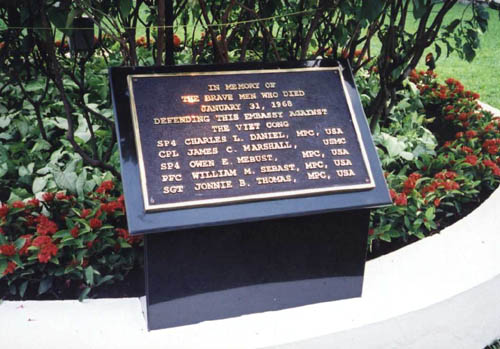
Plaque on planter commemorating the Marine and 4 MPs who died defending the U.S. Embassy, Saigon on 31 January 1968
- A monument in Lam Son Square, outside the Park Hyatt Saigon, commemorates the Brinks Hotel bombing on 24 December 1964. The bombing by Viet Cong commandos killed two American servicemen and wounded approximately 60 people. The monument honors the operation carried out by the Saigon commando forces and was unveiled on 24 January 2006.
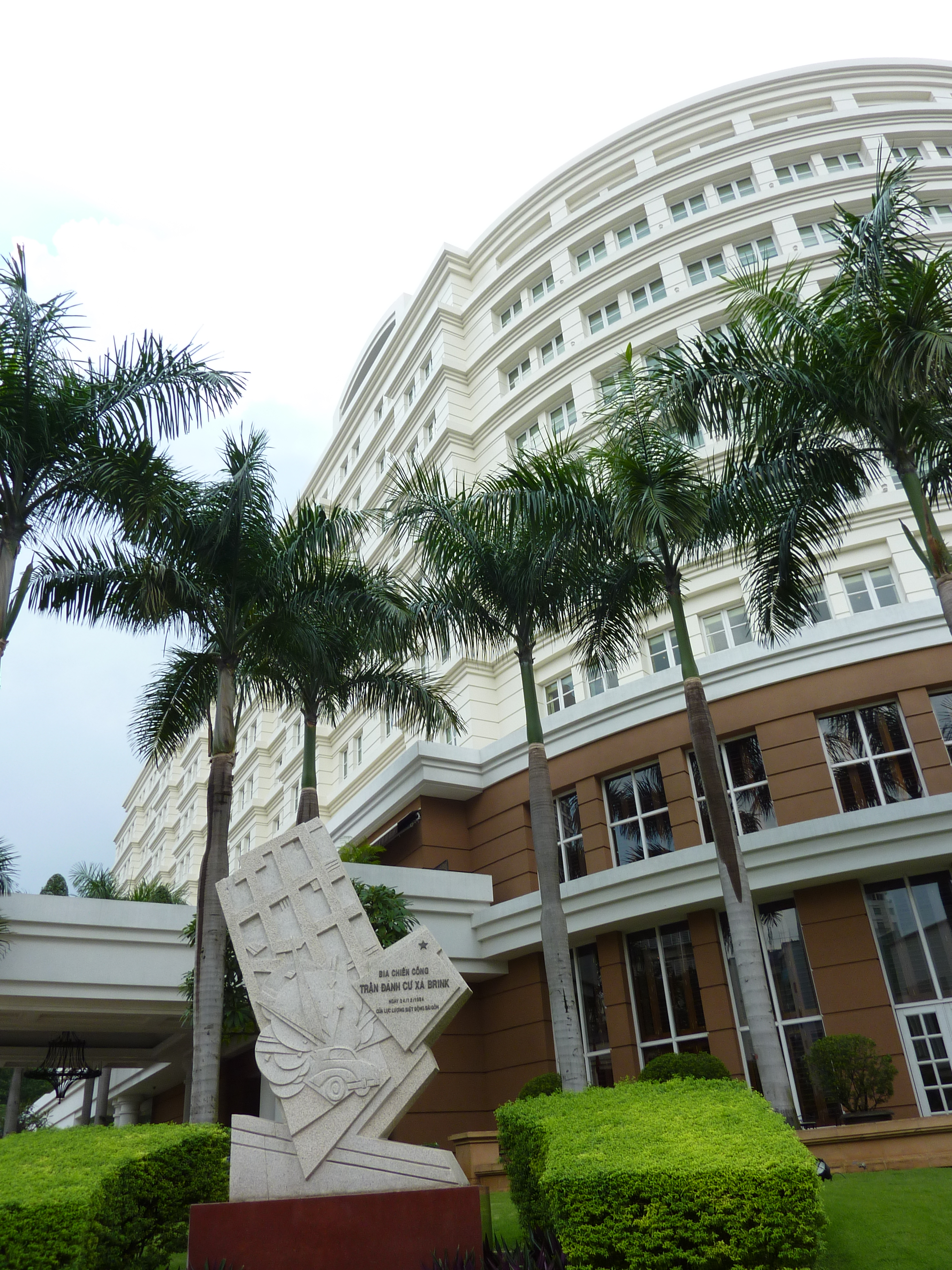
Memorial to the 1964 Brinks Hotel bombing outside the Park Hyatt Saigon
- Vietnamese People's Air Force Museum, Saigon
- War Remnants Museum

== Tay Ninh ==
- The Tay Ninh Museum on 30 Thang 4 has various weaponry and wreckage.
- An outdoor museum on Route 792 (11°44′6.39″N 106°4′35.77″E) has an M41 Walker Bulldog tank, Cadillac Gage V-100 Commando armoured car and M113 armoured personnel carrier.

== Truong Son Cemetery ==
The Trường Sơn Cemetery or Nghĩa trang liệt sĩ Trường Sơn is located on Highway 15 near the village of Ben Tat, northwest of Dong Ha (16°57′16.92″N 106°57′13.50″E). It contains the graves of PAVN soldiers killed on the DMZ and on the Ho Chi Minh Trail.

== Vinh Moc ==
- Vinh Moc tunnels

== Vung Tau ==
- A PAVN memorial is located on a traffic island on Le Hong Phong (10°20′56.33″N 107°5′36.23″E), in central Vung Tau.

== Xuan Loc ==
- A monument on Highway 1 commemorates the eventual People's Army of Vietnam victory in the Battle of Xuân Lộc.
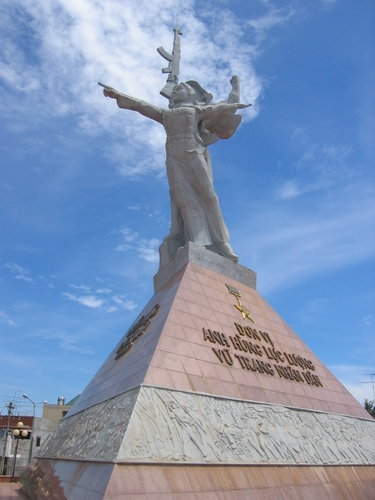
PAVN victory monument at Xuan Loc
- A PAVN cemetery (10°55′23.37″N 107°14′18.57″E) contains the graves of North Vietnamese troops killed in the Battle of Xuân Lộc.

== See also ==
- List of museums in Vietnam
