= Ngọc Hà (disambiguation) =

Ngọc Hà may refer to:

== Locations ==
- Ngọc Hà, a ward of Hanoi
- a former ward of Hà Giang

== People ==
- Hồ Ngọc Hà, a Vietnamese model, pop singer, actress and entertainer.
