= Hữu Tiệp Lake =

Lake in Hanoi, Vietnam

- B-52 Lake
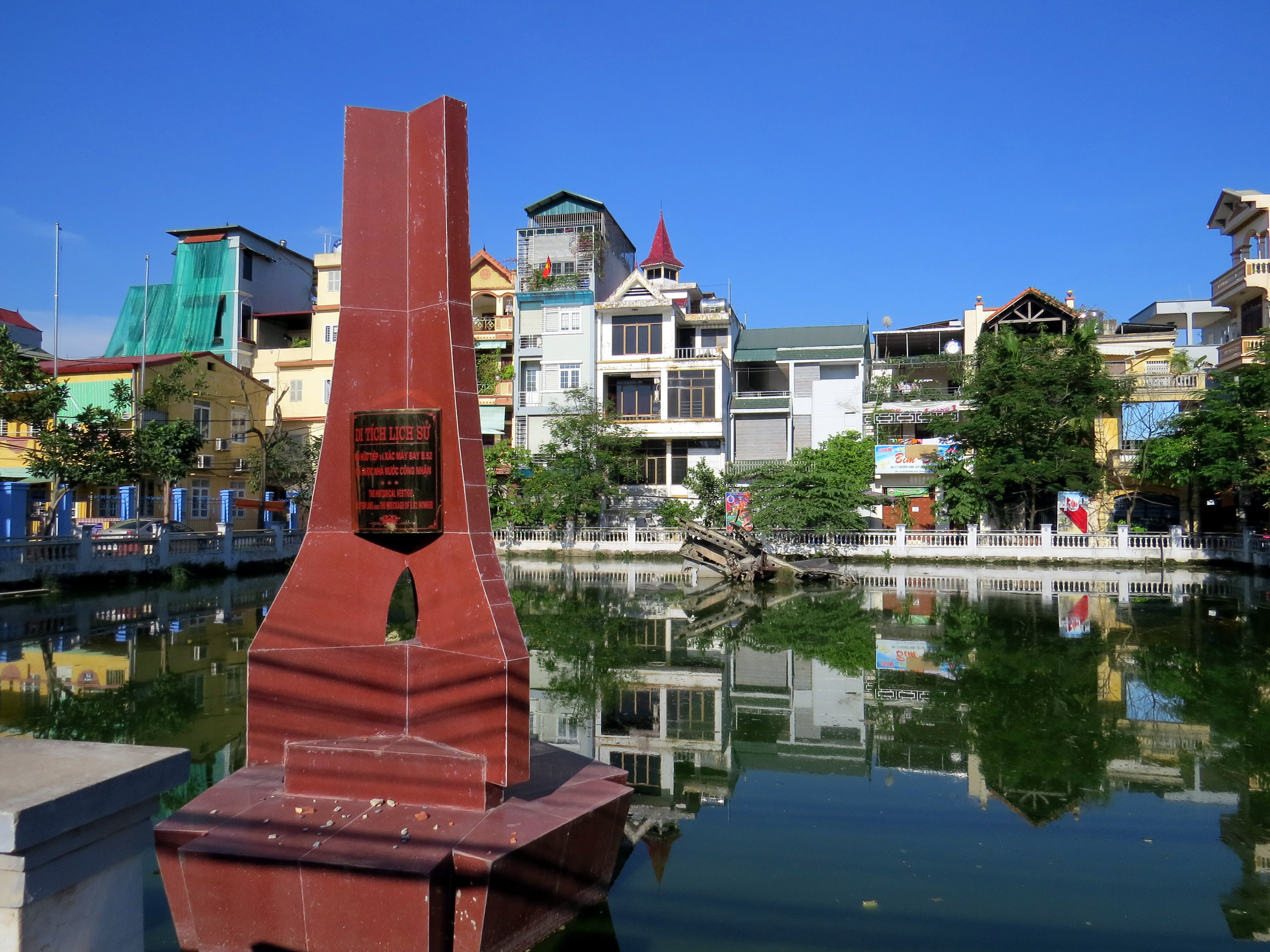
- Interactive map of Hữu Tiệp Lake
- Location: Hanoi, Vietnam
- Coordinates: 21°2′16.47″N 105°49′37.57″E
- Type: Artificial lake Freshwater lake
- Designation: National historical vestige
- Built: 1994

Hữu Tiệp Lake (Vietnamese: Hồ Hữu Tiệp) is a small artificial freshwater lake located in Ngọc Hà Ward, Hanoi.

The lake was once part of a river. Most of the river was filled to be reclaimed as residential zones in 1994, leaving Huu Tiep lake, and a nearby unnamed lake, separated by 55 Hoang Hoa Tham lane.

The lake is also the site of some of the wreckage of a B-52 Stratofortress downed on December 12, 1972 by the 285th regiment of the 363rd division of the Vietnam Air Defence - Air Force Service during Operation Linebacker II, hence the alternative name, B-52 Lake. The lake and the ruins were designated as a national historical vestige on April 22, 1992.

In April 2021, the lake and the ruins of the downed B-52 was renovated by the People's Council of Hanoi City after reports of them downgrading. The renovation was completed and tourists were allowed to visit the site during the 50th anniversary of Operation Linebacker II in 2022.

== See also ==
- B-52 Victory Museum, Hanoi
