= Charlestown Vietnam Veterans Memorial =

War memorial in Boston, Massachusetts, U.S.

Coordinates: 42.37597°N 71.06346°W

- The memorial in November 2019
- Interactive map of Charlestown Vietnam Veterans Memorial
- Location: Charlestown, Boston, Massachusetts, U.S.
- Dedicated date: April 2009
- Dedicated to: Six local men who died who during the Vietnam War

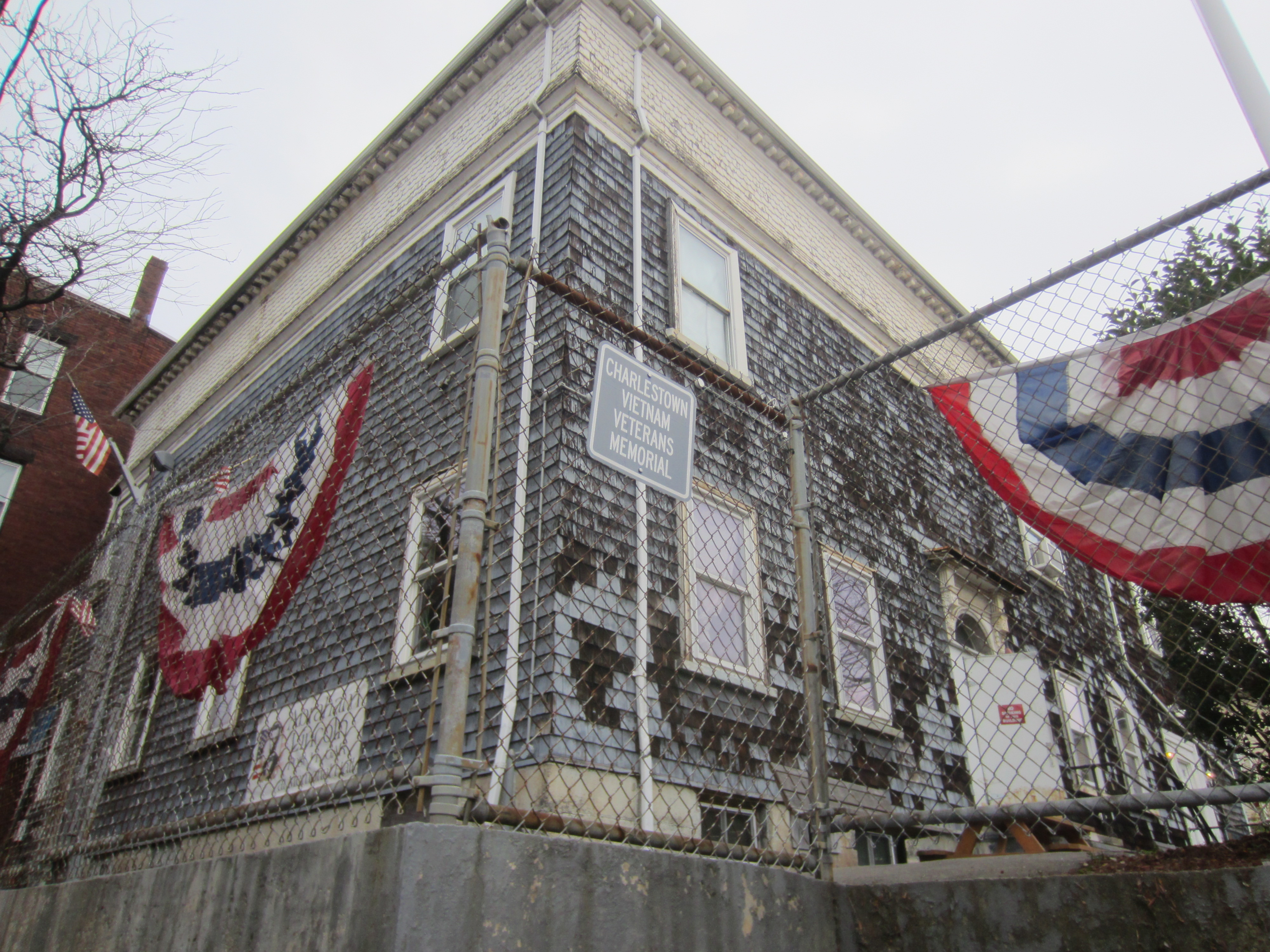
Signage for the memorial outside Veterans Memorial Hall, 2019

The Charlestown Vietnam Veterans Memorial is a war memorial commemorating six local men who died who during the Vietnam War, installed outside Veterans Memorial Hall in Charlestown, Boston, in the U.S. state of Massachusetts. The memorial was dedicated in April 2009.

== See also ==
- List of Vietnam War monuments and memorials
