= Vietnam Memorial (Austin, Texas) =

War memorial in the United States

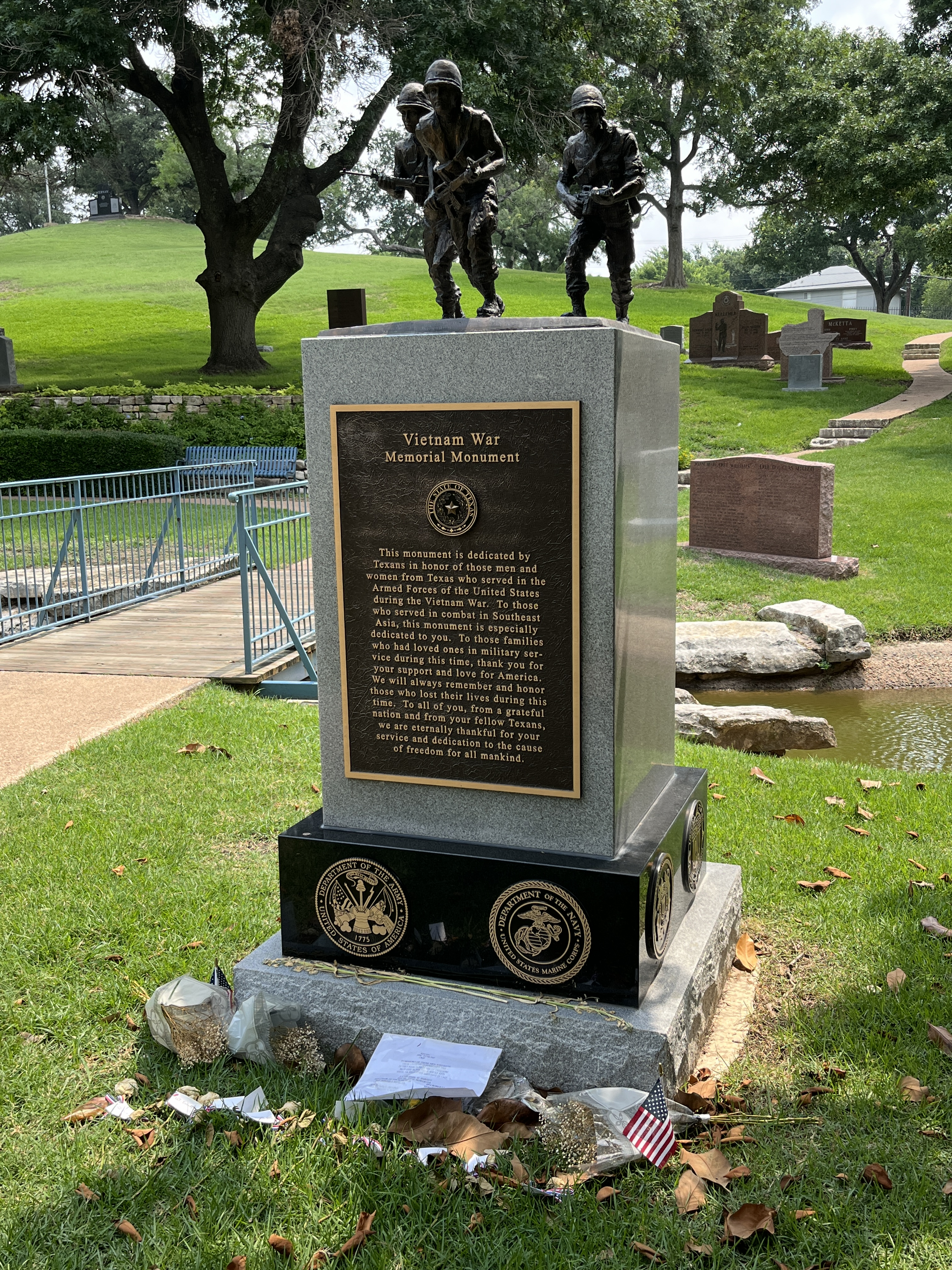
- The monument in 2024
- 30°15′58.4″N 97°43′33.3″W
- Location: Austin, Texas, U.S.

The Vietnam Memorial is installed at the Texas State Cemetery in Austin, Texas. Dedicated on April 19, 2008, the grey and black granite monument has a bronze sculpture on top and commemorates Texas veterans of the Vietnam War.

== Inscription ==
The inscription on the memorial reads:

This monument is dedicated by Texans in honor of those men and women from Texas who served in the Armed Forces of the United States during the Vietnam War. To those who served in combat in Southeast Asia, this monument is especially dedicated to you. To those families who had loved ones in military service during this time, thank you for your support and love for America. We will always remember and honor those who lost their lives during this time. To all of you, from a grateful nation and from your fellow Texans, we are eternally thankful for your service and dedication to the cause of freedom for all mankind.

== See also ==
- 2008 in art
- List of Vietnam War monuments and memorials
