= Vietnam Veterans Memorial (Olympia, Washington) =

Vietname War memorial in Olympia, Washington, U.S.

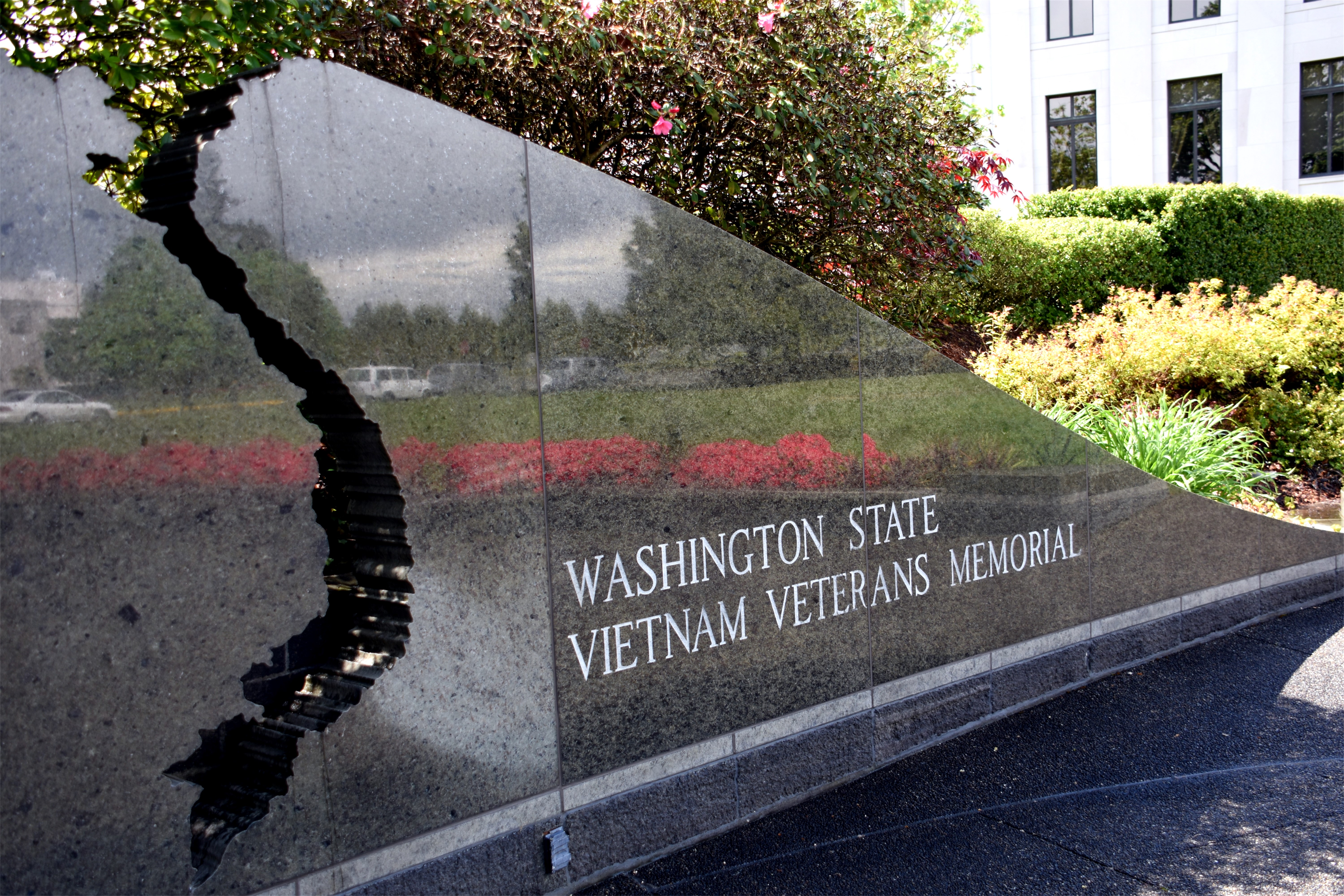
- Vietnam Veterans Memorial - Olympia, Washington
- Interactive map of Vietnam Veterans Memorial
- Location: Washington State Capitol campus, Olympia, Washington
- Coordinates: 47°02′09″N 122°54′09″W
- Designer: Kris Snider
- Material: Granite
- Dedicated date: May 25, 1987

The Vietnam Veterans Memorial by Kris Snider is installed on the Washington State Capitol campus in Olympia, Washington, United States. The granite memorial was dedicated on Memorial Day, May 25, 1987. It replaced an earlier memorial that was placed in 1982.

== Materials and design ==
The memorial cost $178,000, which was covered by private contributions and corporate donations. It is one of two Vietnam memorials in the United States to depict a map of Vietnam in its design. The memorial is built of curving stone, evoking the national Vietnam Veterans Memorial in the District of Columbia, but unlike Arlington's black stone, the Washington state memorial uses native green granite. It is "a semicircular wall that stretches partially around a 45-foot base on a rolling course, seven feet tall at the apex, one foot at its lowest point".

The names of 1,124 state residents killed or missing in the conflict are inscribed on the memorial, along with the following words:

Washington State Vietnam Veterans Memorial

To all my brothers and sisters who made it back, but never made it home. In memory of those who have died from physical and emotional wounds received while serving in the Vietnam War. We honor and recognize their pain and suffering, but above all we respect the courage of these Washington State residents. When our country called, you were there. We have not forgotten, you are not alone.

You Now Rest in Glory.

— Inscription

=== Designer ===
The architect, Kris Snider, is a landscape architect who also executed work at Bell Street Pier and Harbor Steps in Seattle, and Redmond Town Center.

== Public interaction ==
Members of the community leave objects at the memorial, as is done at many other Vietnam memorials in the United States. Objects deposited there include beverages, a recording of Jimi Hendrix's music, a Chevrolet gearshift knob, and printed material. Tributes at the memorial are collected and stored at the Washington State Archives.

Official Veterans Day observances involving hundreds of people are held by the state government at the Washington State Legislative Building and on the capitol grounds, including observances at the Vietnam Veterans Memorial. A special "welcome home" ceremony for the fallen was held by the state Department of Veterans Affairs in March 2026.

== 1982 memorial ==
The first memorial at the State Capitol was a marble box holding a scroll listing the names of Washington state residents killed or missing in action in the war. It was dedicated by Governor John Spellman on Veterans Day, November 11, 1982, the same day that the national Vietnam Veterans Memorial was dedicated.

== See also ==
- List of Vietnam War monuments and memorials
