= Hội An Museum =

Museum in Hội An, Vietnam

- Bảo tàng Hội An
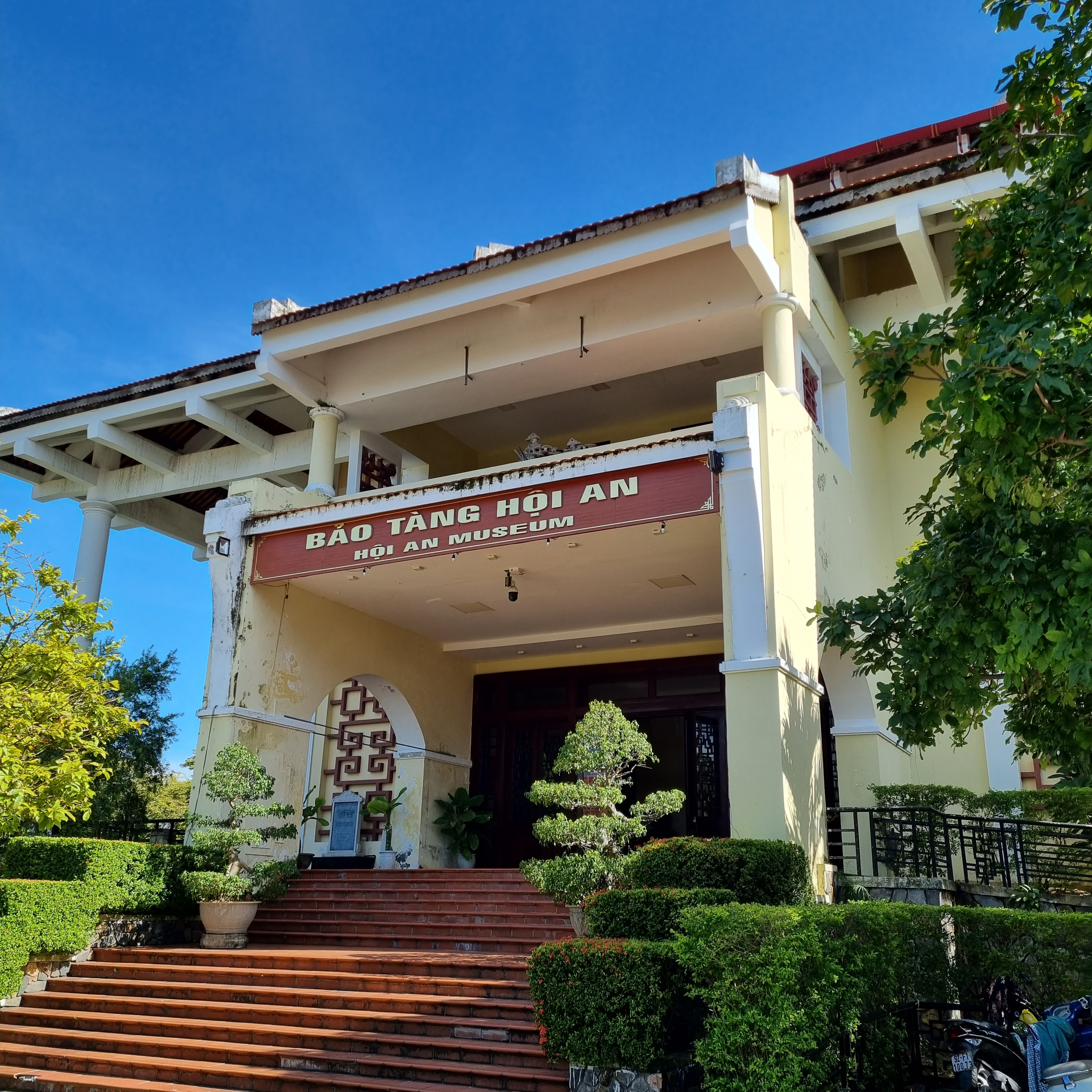
- Hoi An Museum main building
- Established: 1989
- Location: 10B Trần Hưng Đạo, Hội An, Vietnam
- Coordinates: 15.879°N 108.329°E
- Type: History museum
- Owner: Hội An City People's Committee
- Website: www.hoianheritage.net

The Hội An Museum (Vietnamese: Bảo tàng Hội An), also known as the Hội An Museum of History and Culture, is a history museum located at 10B Trần Hưng Đạo, Hội An, Vietnam. It was founded in 1989.

The Museum's opening hours are from 07:30 to 17:00 daily.
