= Museum of Trade Ceramics =

Museum in Hoi An, central Vietnam

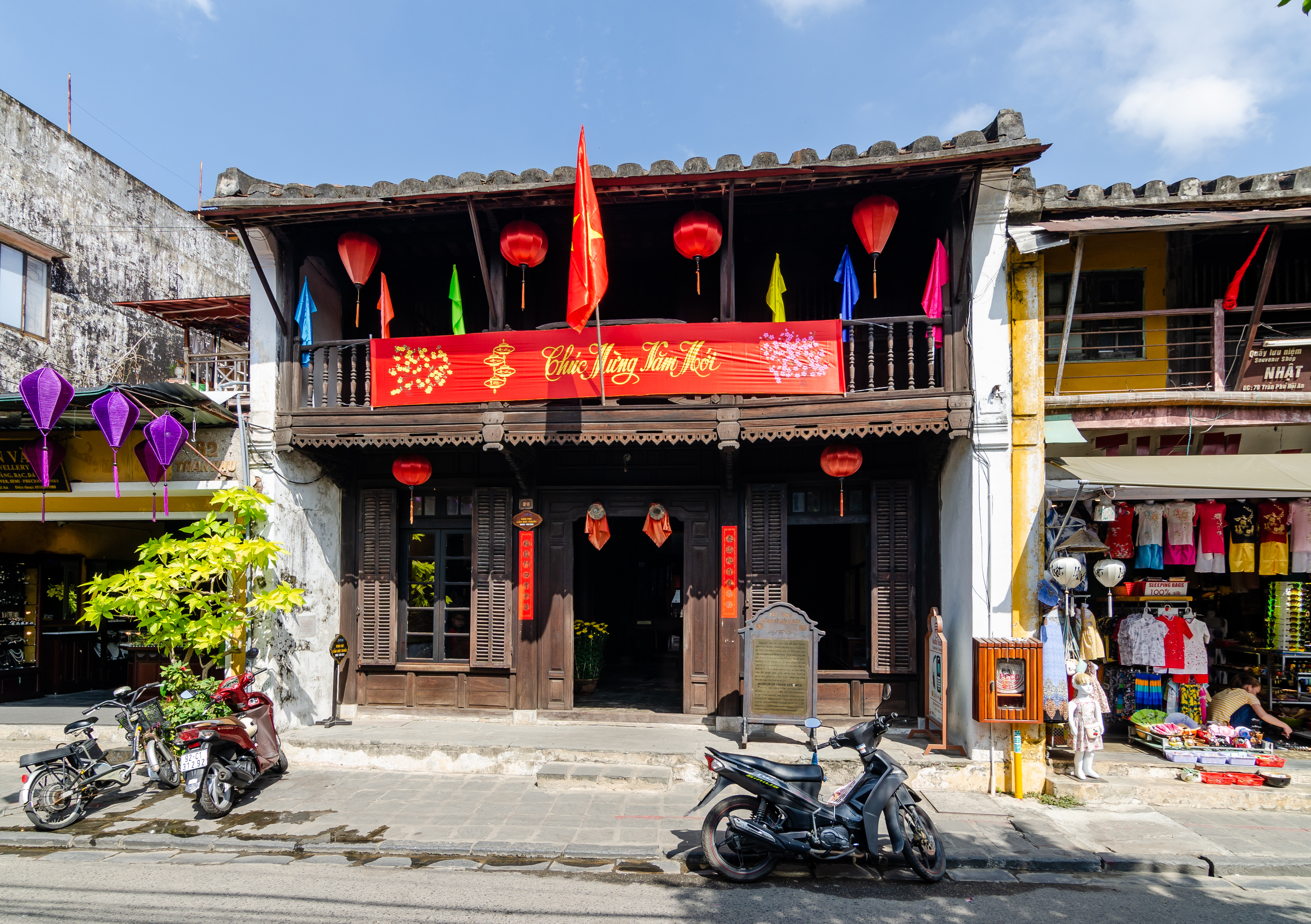
- Location: Hoi An, Vietnam
- Coordinates: 15°52′38″N 108°19′47″E

The Museum of Trade Ceramics is located in Hoi An, central Vietnam. It is a museum showcasing the origins and history of the town and the region in the context of historic trade and relationships with foreign nations such as China, India, Japan, the Philippines and Thailand. The building housing the museum is itself an attractively restored traditional wooden house of Hoi An's old quarter, which, on account of design similarity and a historically significant local Japanese trading community, is likened to those of Kyoto.

== Literature ==
- Lenzi, Iola (2004). Museums of Southeast Asia. Singapore: Archipelago Press. pp. 200 pages. ISBN 981-4068-96-9.
