= Nam Định Textile Museum =

Museum in Vietnam

Coordinates: 20.42493°N 106.17004°E

The Nam Định Textile Museum is built on the site of the former Nam Định Textile Factory, once the largest factory in Indochina.

The Nam Định Textile Museum was created in 2012 by the Vietnam National Textile and Garment Group (also known as Natexco) on the site of the former Nam Định Textile Factory. Located at 5 Hoang Hoa Street, Tham, Nam Dinh city, in the traditional housing area of the Factory, the museum has a French-style architecture.

The Nam Định Textile Factory was established by French colonists in 1898. During the French Occupation, the Nam Định Textile Factory employed over 18,000 people, about a tenth of the local population. The Factory played an important role during the Vietnam War as a centre of resistance against the Americans. Ho Chi Minh visited the factory several times. The museum retains many relics of the war.

In 2016, the Textile Factory was relocated to Hoa Xa Industrial Park in Nghia Hung District, and redevelopment of the factory site began.

== See also ==
- Nam Định
- Ho Chi Minh
