= Memorial to the Revolutionary Martyrs =

War Memorial in central Hanoi

The War Memorial in Hanoi is located across the Ba Đình Square, across the Ho Chi Minh Mausoleum and close to Hanoi Citadel. Designed by architect Lê Hiệp and constructed in 1993 in a fusion of traditional Vietnamese and modernist architecture, the memorial commemorates men and women who sacrificed themselves during the Vietnam War. The war is known by many names, e.g. as the American War in Vietnam. The memorial is a focal point for state functions, commemorating the war dead.

== See also ==
- List of war museums and monuments in Vietnam
- Vietnam Veterans Memorial in Washington, DC
- Terminology of the Vietnam War
