= Long Tan Cross =

Monument in Vietnam

- Australia
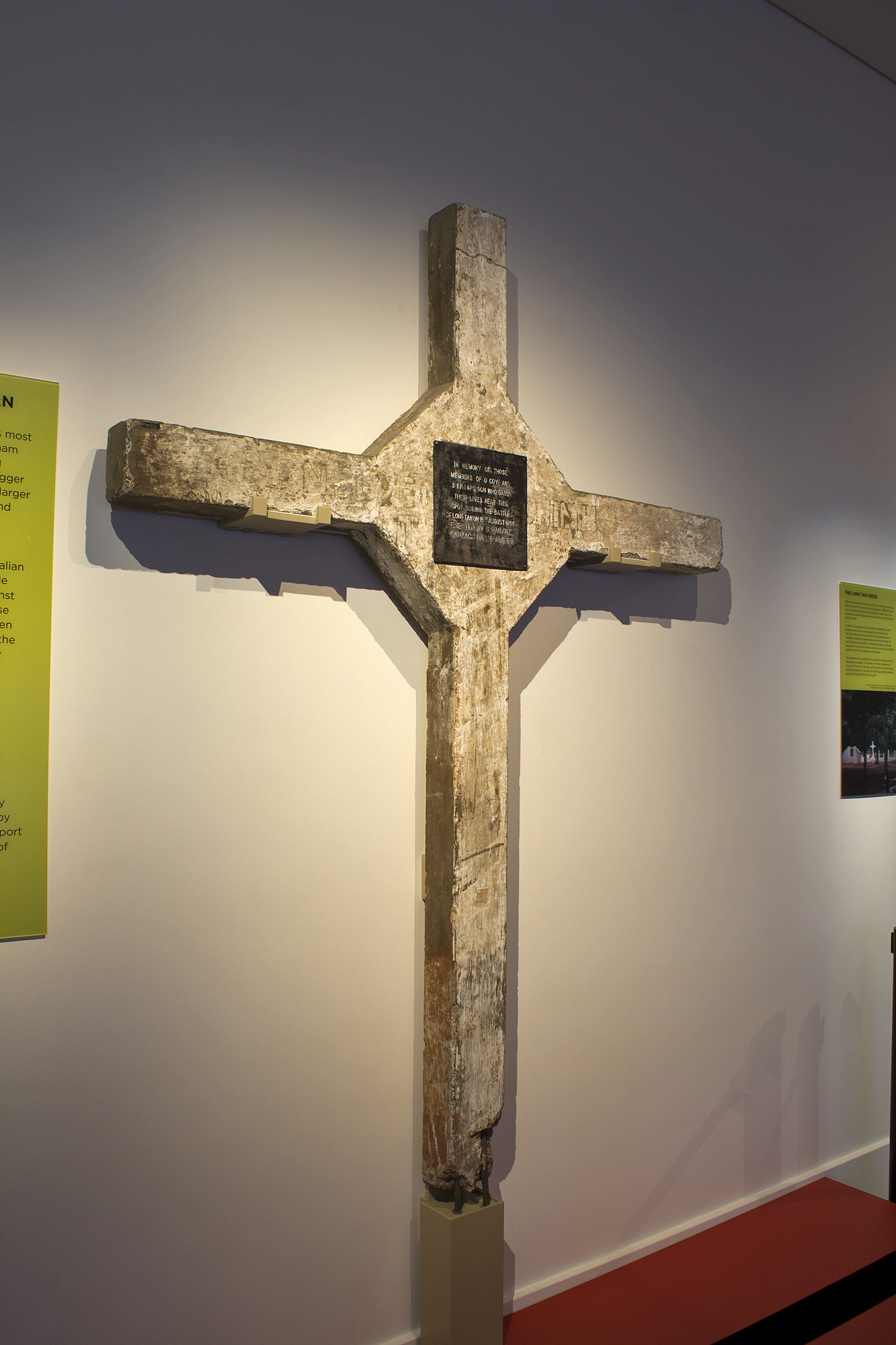
- The Long Tan Cross on display at the Australian War Memorial in August 2012
- For the Battle of Long Tan
- Established: 18 August 1969
- Location: Australian War Memorial, Canberra
- In Memory of those members of D Coy 6 RAR and 3 Tp 1 APC Sqn who gave their lives near this spot during the Battle of Long Tan on 18th August 1966. Erected by 6 RAR/NZ (ANZAC) Bn 18 Aug 69

The Long Tan Cross is a memorial which was erected by the 6th Battalion, Royal Australian Regiment on 18 August 1969 to mark the site of the Battle of Long Tan, which was fought three years earlier during the Vietnam War. While the cross was removed following the Communist victory in 1975 and used to commemorate a priest, it was recovered by the Đồng Nai Province Museum in 1984 and placed on display. A replica cross was also erected on the battlefield during the 1980s, and is frequently visited by Australian Vietnam War veterans. The original Long Tan Cross was gifted to Australia in 2017 and placed on permanent display at the Australian War Memorial in Canberra.

== History ==
During the afternoon and evening of 18 August 1966, D Company of the 6th Battalion, Royal Australian Regiment (6 RAR) fought an intense battle with a much larger force of Vietnamese communist troops near Long Tân in South Vietnam. While the Australian force comprised only 108 men, it managed to defeat the approximately 2000-strong Communist force with the assistance of supporting artillery and air strikes. 6 RAR and the other Australian units engaged suffered 18 killed and 24 wounded, making this the most costly Australian battle of the war. Australian records state that 245 of the Communist troops were killed in the fighting but the official Vietnamese record states that only 47 troops were killed. The true number of casualties remains unknown.

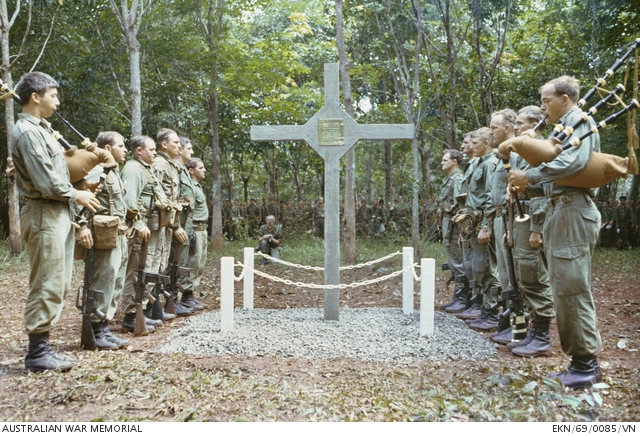
Part of the dedication ceremony for the Long Tan Cross in August 1969

6 RAR erected the Long Tan Cross to mark the third anniversary of the battle. According to an article in The Canberra Times, the cross was "the brainchild of Lieutenant Colonel David Butler and Warrant Officer James Cruickshank", and was constructed from concrete by New Zealand Army Corporal Barry McAvinue, attached to 6 RAR. Barry was an assault pioneer, and had been a cabinet maker before joining the New Zealand Army. The cross weighs over 100 kilograms (220 lb) and is just under 2 metres (6.6 ft) tall.

On 17 August 1969, A and D Companies of 6 RAR landed by helicopter near the former battle site and secured the area. The next morning, infantrymen and assault pioneers cleared the area around the location where 11 Platoon of D Company had conducted a last stand during the Battle of Long Tan. A Royal Australian Air Force helicopter then delivered the cross to the site. The remainder of the battalion arrived during the morning, and 6 RAR's chaplain led a ceremony to dedicate the memorial. Ten men from the battalion who had fought in the battle stood at the side of the cross throughout the proceedings. The ceremony concluded before noon, and 6 RAR returned to the nearby major Australian base at Nui Dat; D Company was the last element of the battalion to leave the site. The inscription on the cross reads: "In Memory of those members of D Coy 6 RAR and 3 Tp 1 APC Sqn who gave their lives near this spot during the Battle of Long Tan on 18th August 1966. Erected by 6 RAR/NZ (ANZAC) Bn 18 Aug 69".

At some time after the Fall of Saigon and the end of the Vietnam War in 1975, the Long Tan Cross was removed from the battle site. It was subsequently used as a memorial for a Catholic priest until 1984, when it was located by the Đồng Nai Province Museum in Biên Hòa. The museum added it to its collection, and placed the cross on display alongside other items from the war. In either 1986 or 1989, a replica of the Long Tan Cross was erected on the battle site by the Long Dat District People's Committee. This replica is often visited by Australian Vietnam War veterans and, as at 2012, was one of only two memorials to foreign military forces permitted in Vietnam (the other being a monument to the French forces who fought in the Battle of Dien Bien Phu during 1954).

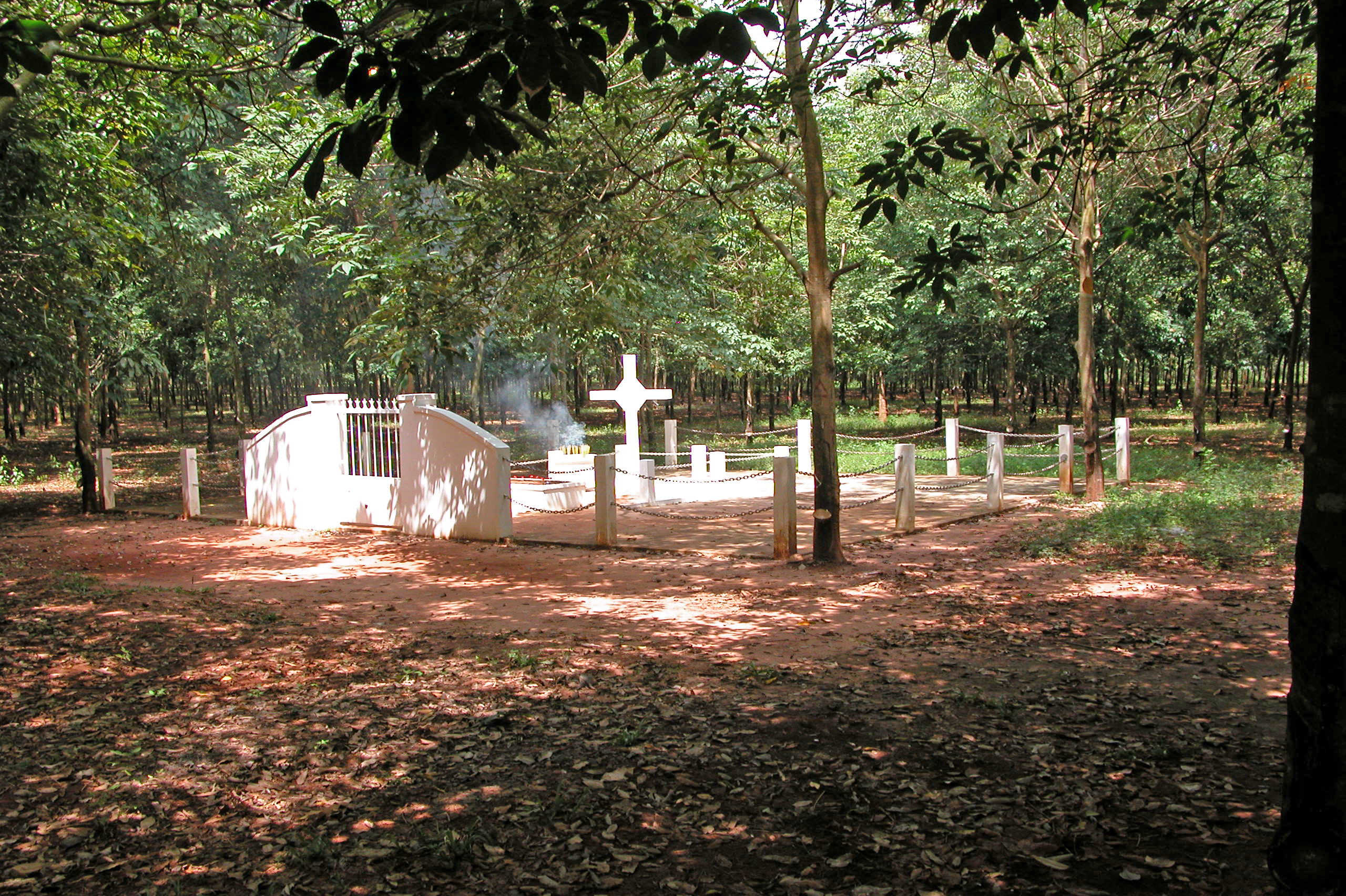
The replica cross and view of the Long Tan battlefield

The original Long Tan Cross was loaned to the Australian War Memorial in Canberra in mid-2012. It was placed on display at the Memorial on 17 August, and was returned to Vietnam in April 2013. In 2016 the Australian War Memorial unsuccessfully sought for the Cross to be loaned to it to mark the 50th anniversary of the battle.

In November 2017 the Vietnamese Government gifted the original Long Tan Cross to Australia. It was placed on permanent display at the Australian War Memorial on 6 December 2017.

== See also ==
- List of war museums and monuments in Vietnam
