= Museum of Worldwide Arms =

Museum in Vũng Tàu, Bà Rịa-Vũng Tàu, Vietnam

The Museum of Worldwide Arms, officially the Robert Taylor Museum of Worldwide Arms, is a museum of military history and equipment in Vũng Tàu, Bà Rịa-Vũng Tàu, Vietnam. Established in 2016, the privately owned museum hosts a large number of weapons, uniforms, and other historical artifacts.

== Description ==
The museum was established by Robert Taylor, a British national who had amassed a private collection of military artifacts in the United Kingdom. Taylor was married to a Vietnamese national, and lived in Vũng Tàu since the early 2000s. The efforts to establish the museum were supported by the local government, which viewed the museum as a way to increase tourism to the city. The museum was granted a license in 2011 and was opened in 2016.

The museum's collection contains several thousand objects, including weapons, uniforms, and other military paraphernalia. It is the largest private arms museum in Vietnam.
