= B-52 Victory Museum, Hanoi =

Military museum in Ba Đình district, Hanoi

B-52 Victory Museum
- Bảo Tàng Chiến Thắng B.52
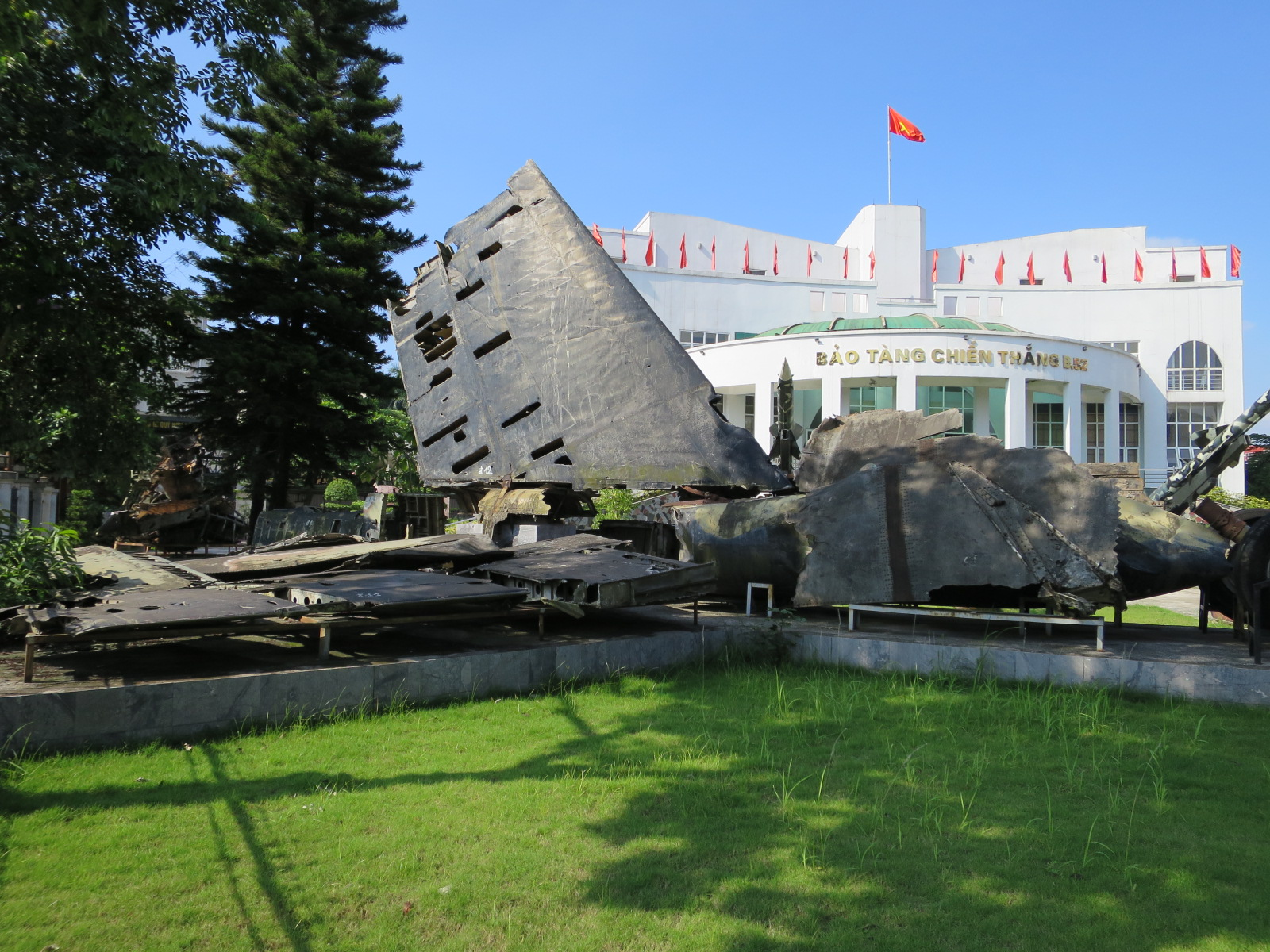
- B-52 tail section and Museum building
- Location: 157 Đội Cấn, Ba Đình Ward, Hanoi
- Coordinates: 21°02′08″N 105°49′34″E
- Type: Military museum
- Owner: Government of Vietnam

The B-52 Victory Museum, Hanoi or Bảo Tàng Chiến Thắng B.52 is located at 157 Đội Cấn, Ba Đình district, Hanoi. The museum's name refers to the "more than a dozen" Boeing B-52 bombers shot down in December 1972 by North Vietnamese air defense crews.

The museum comprises one main building with displays on the history of the Vietnamese revolution, the First Indochina War, the Vietnam War, Operations Rolling Thunder, Linebacker and Linebacker II and the air defense of Hanoi. The outdoor displays include the wreckage of a Boeing B-52D or G Stratofortress apparently shot down during Operation Linebacker II (although no specific details are provided) and various air defense equipment.

The museum is open Tuesday-Thursday and Saturday-Sunday from 08:00 to 11:30 and 13:00 to 16:30. Entry is free.

The museum is located approximately 300m south of the Huu Tiep Lake which contains part of the undercarriage section of the B-52 at the museum. A plaque at the lake states that the aircraft was a B-52G shot down by a surface-to-air missile (SAM) fired by the 72nd Battalion, 285th Air Defence Missile Regiment on 27 December 1972, however, the only B-52s lost that day were two B-52Ds.

== Aircraft on display ==
Aircraft on outside display are:

- wreckage of a Boeing B-52D or G Stratofortress
- Mikoyan-Gurevich MiG-21

== Other display items ==
Also on display outside are:

- ZPU-1
- ZPU-2
- ZPU-4
- 37 mm automatic air defense gun M1939 (61-K)
- 57 mm AZP S-60
- KS-19 100 mm air defense gun
- SNR-75 Fan Song radar
- two S-75 Dvina SA-2 Guideline SAMs
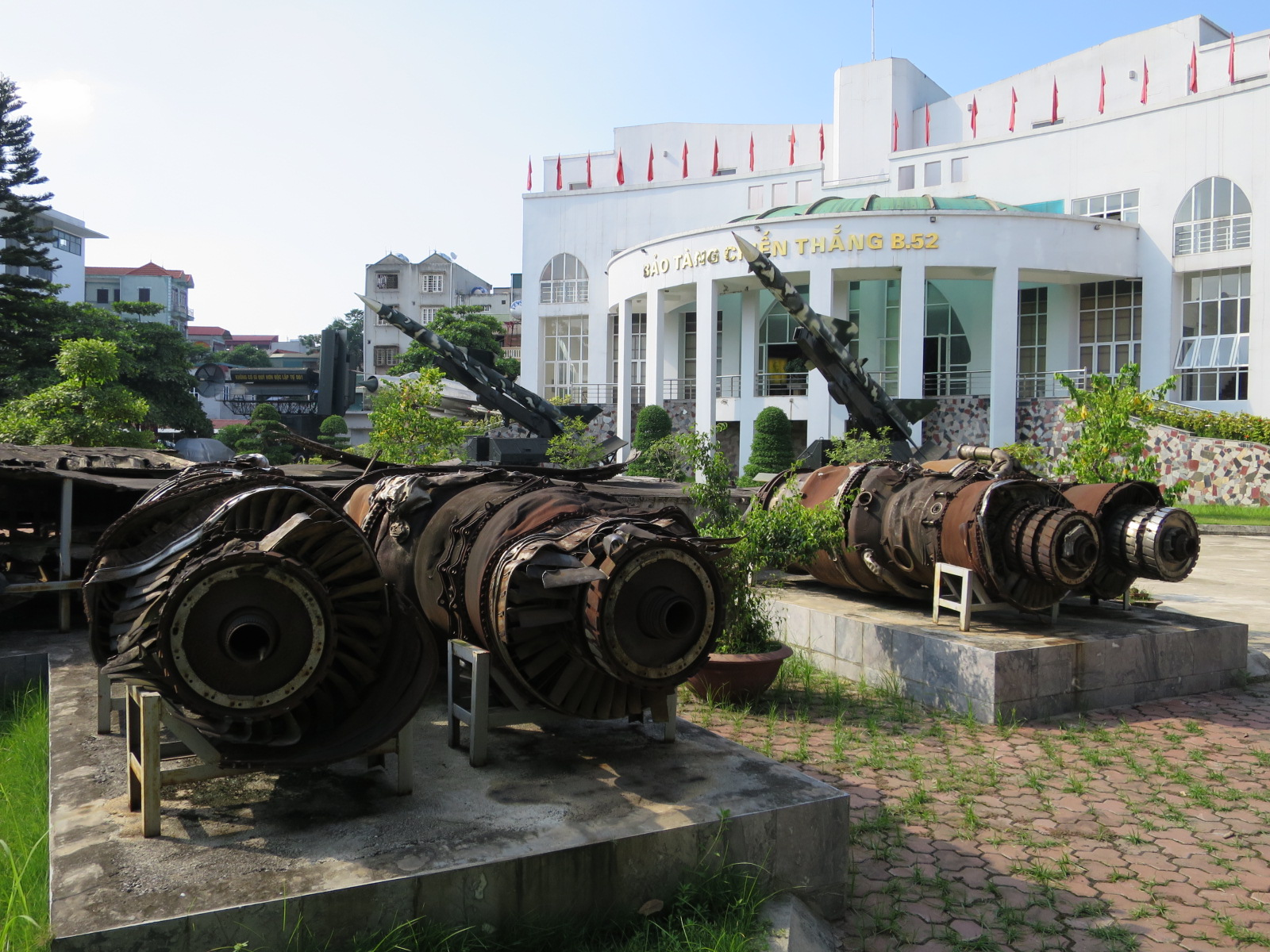
B-52 engines

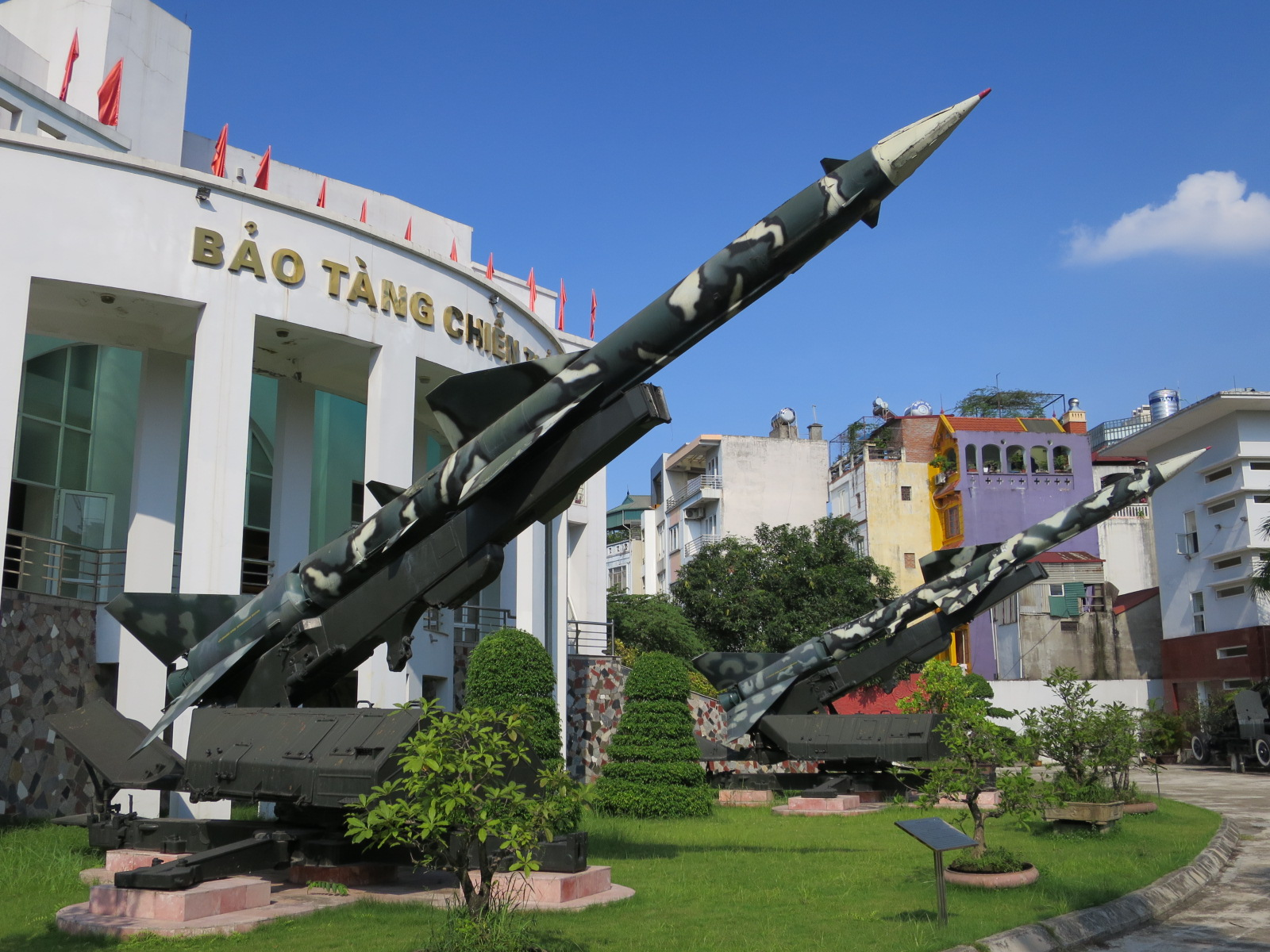
SA-2 missiles

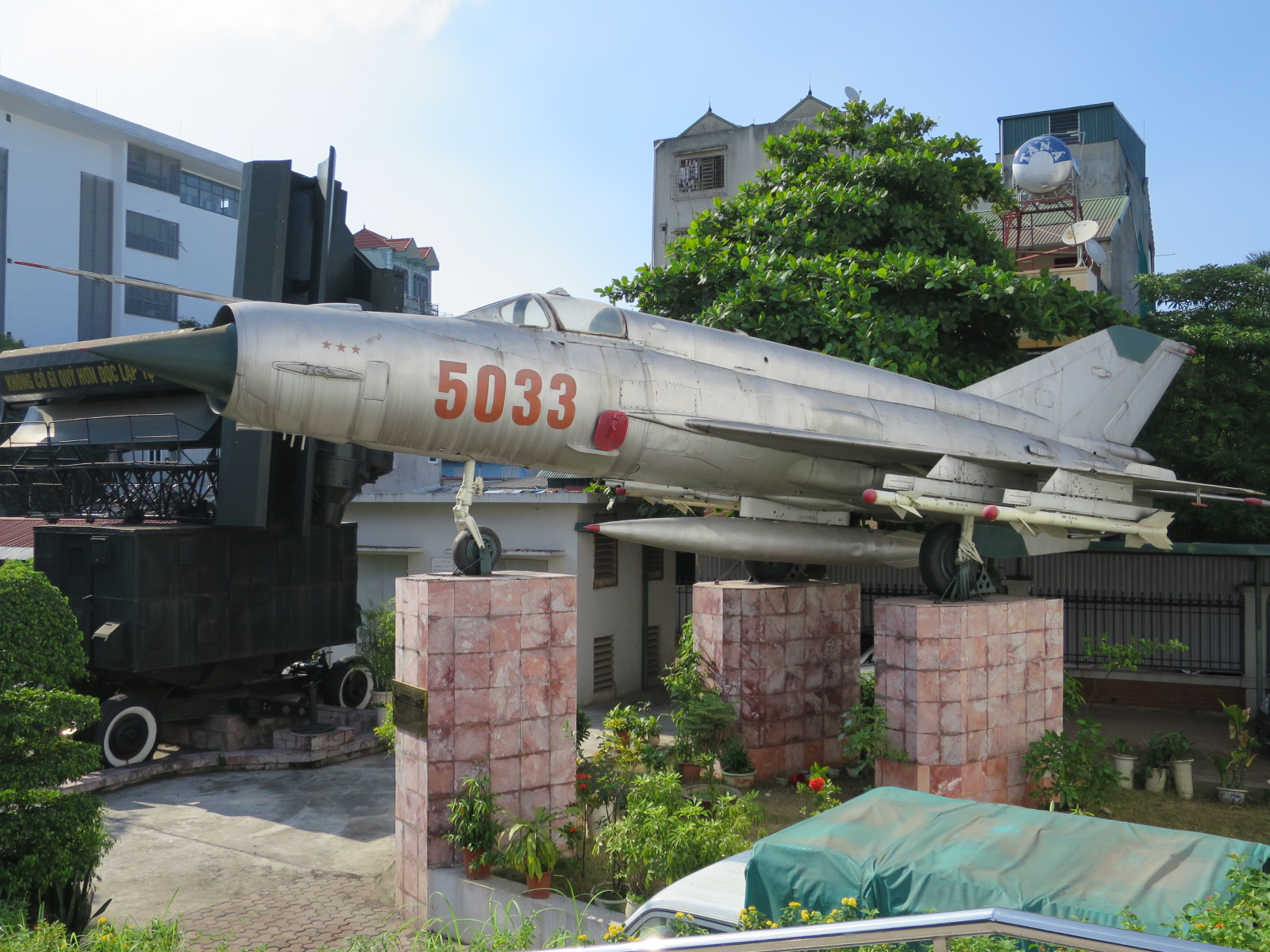
MiG-21

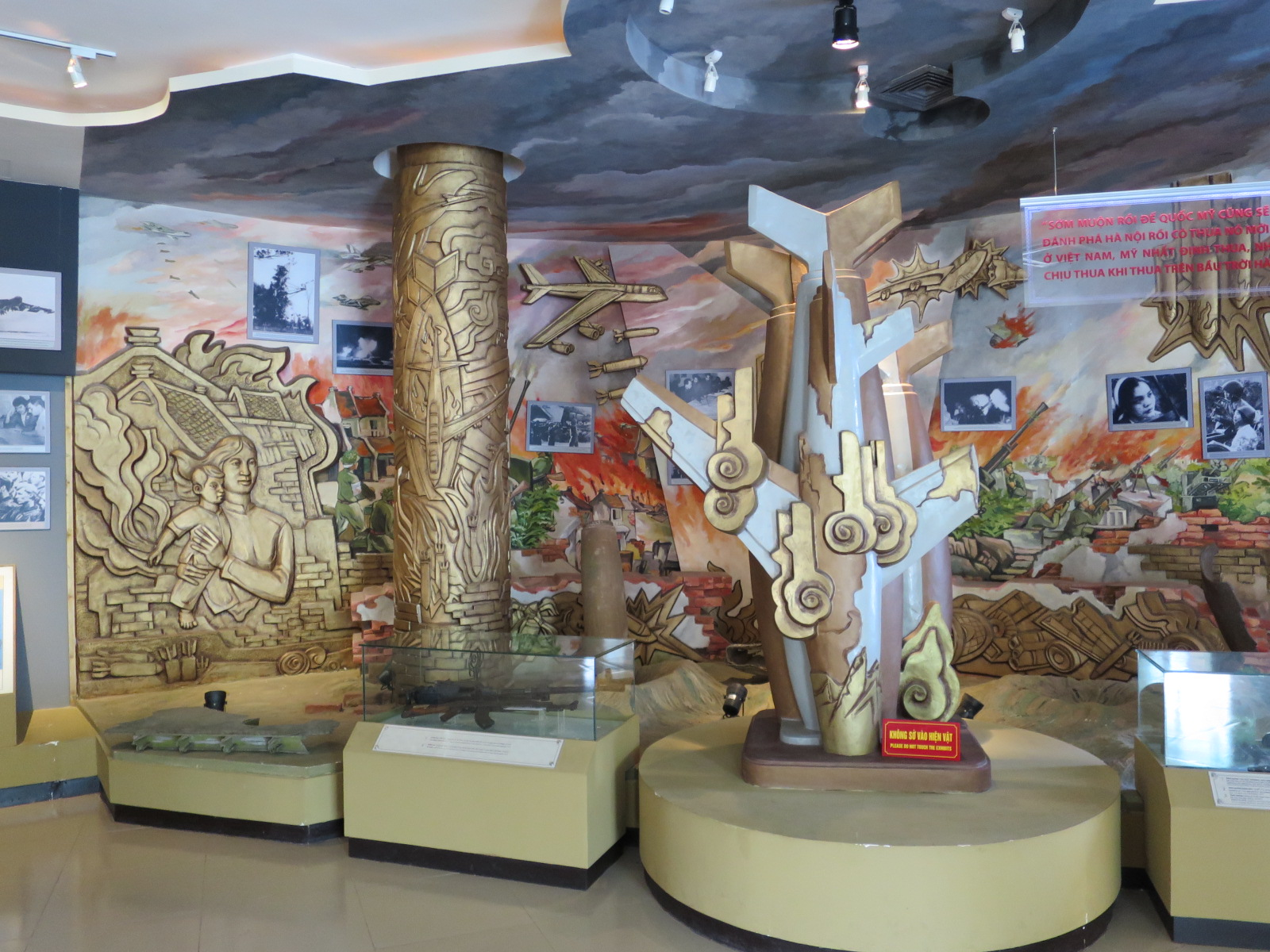
Museum mural 1

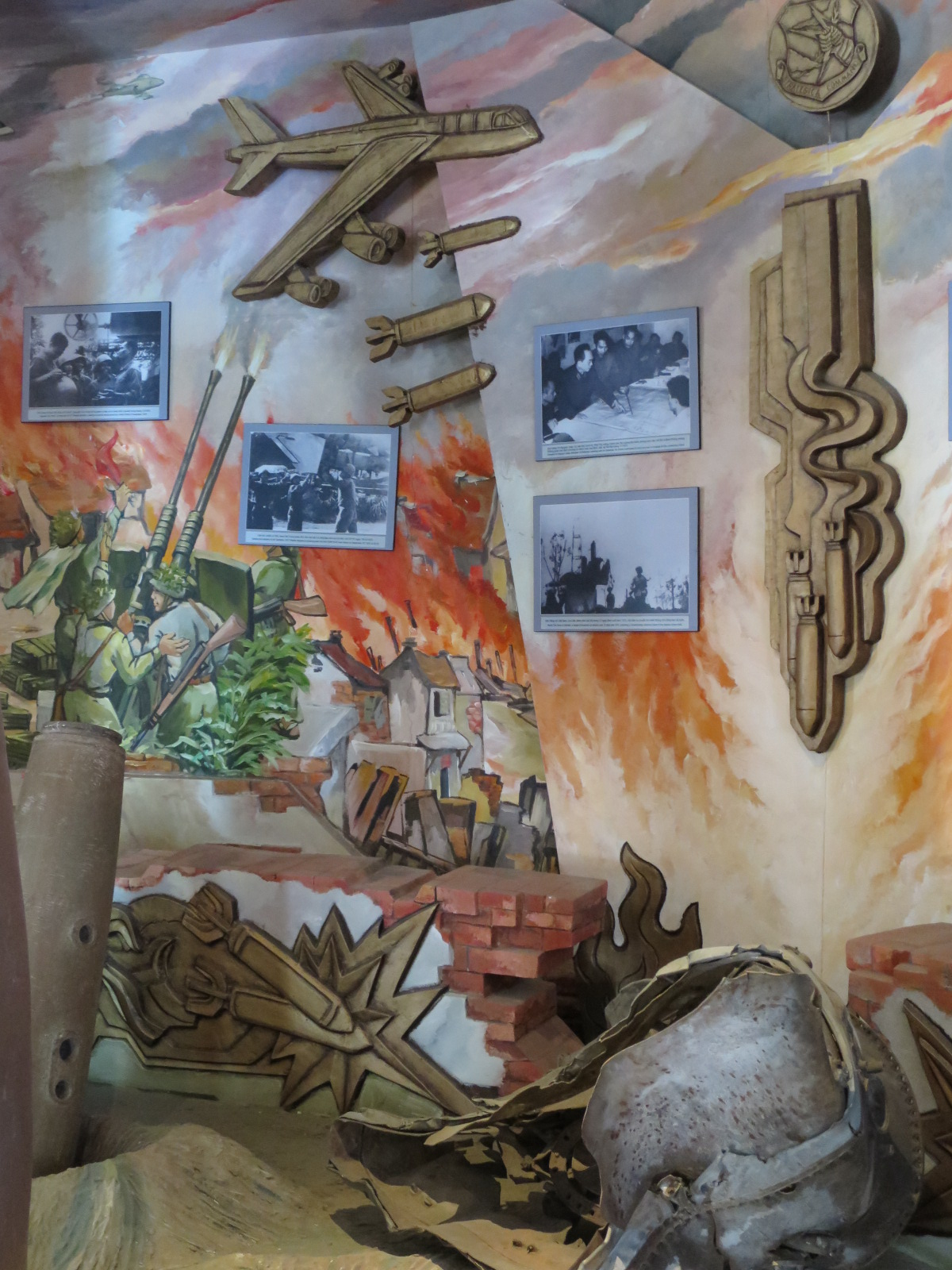
Museum mural 2

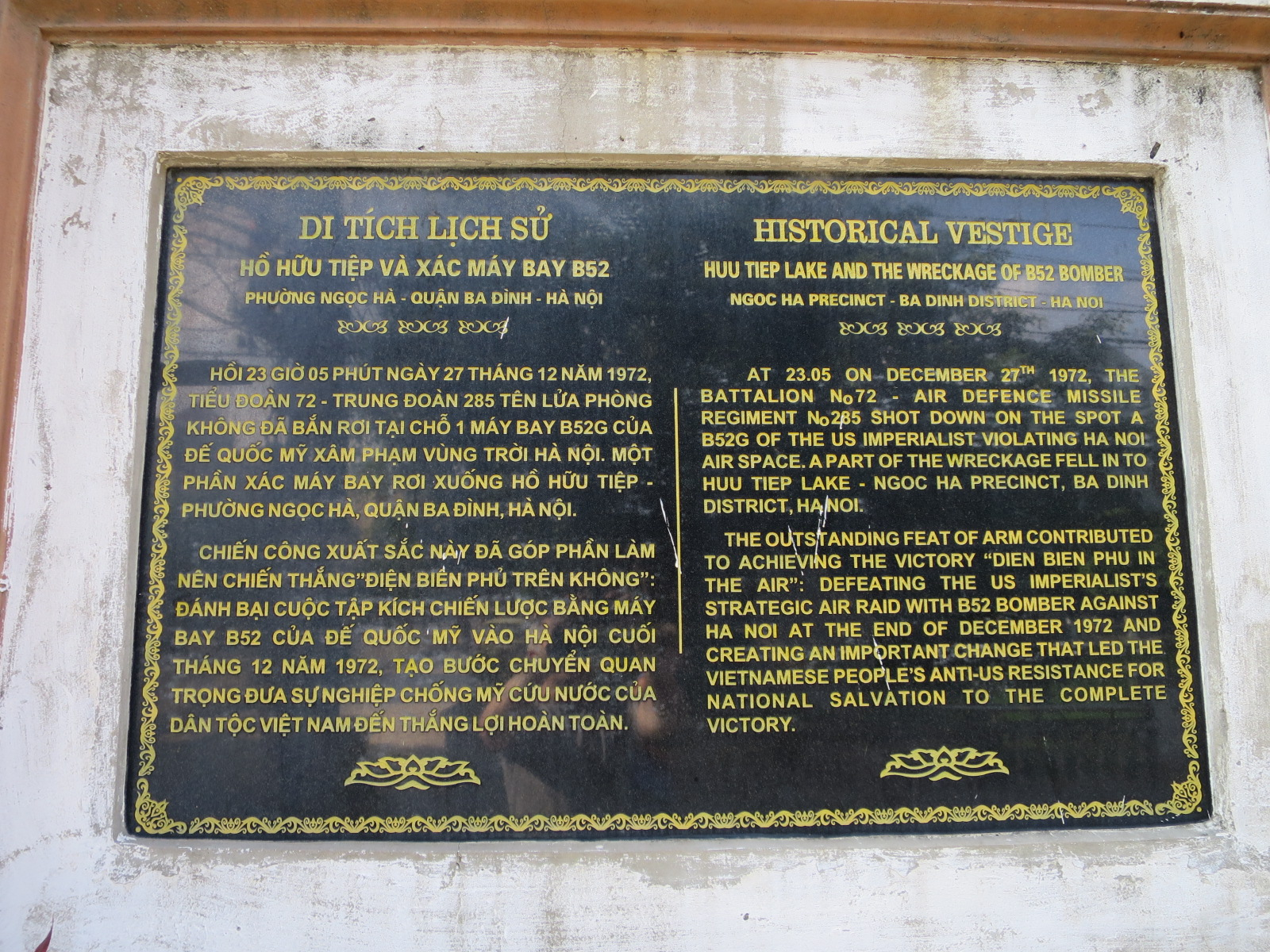
Huu Tiep Lake plaque

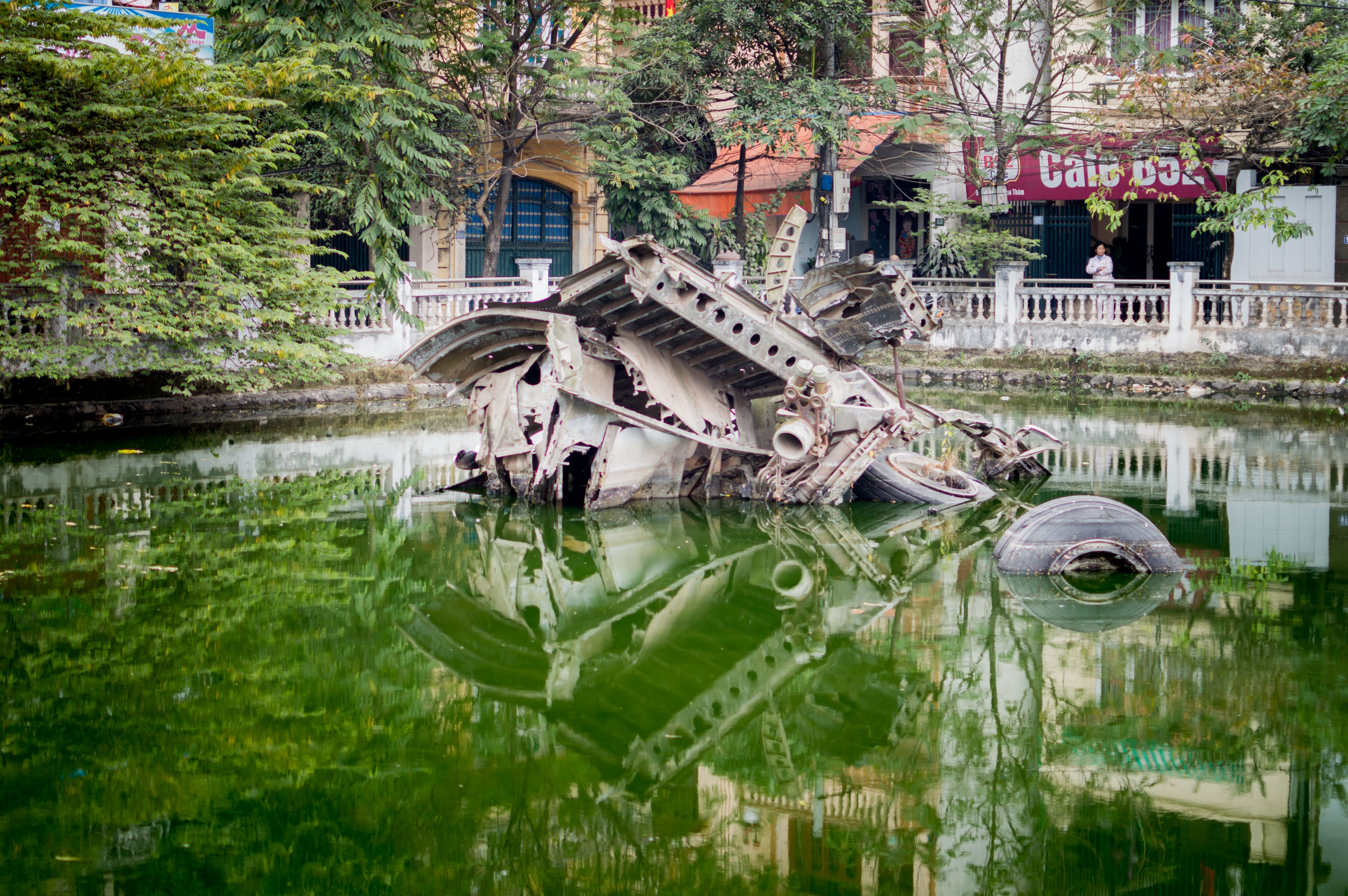
B-52 wreckage in Huu Tiep Lake

== See also ==
- Vietnam People's Air Force Museum, Hanoi
