= Ngọc Hà =

Ngọc Hà Ward Phường Ngọc Hà
- Ward (Class-II)
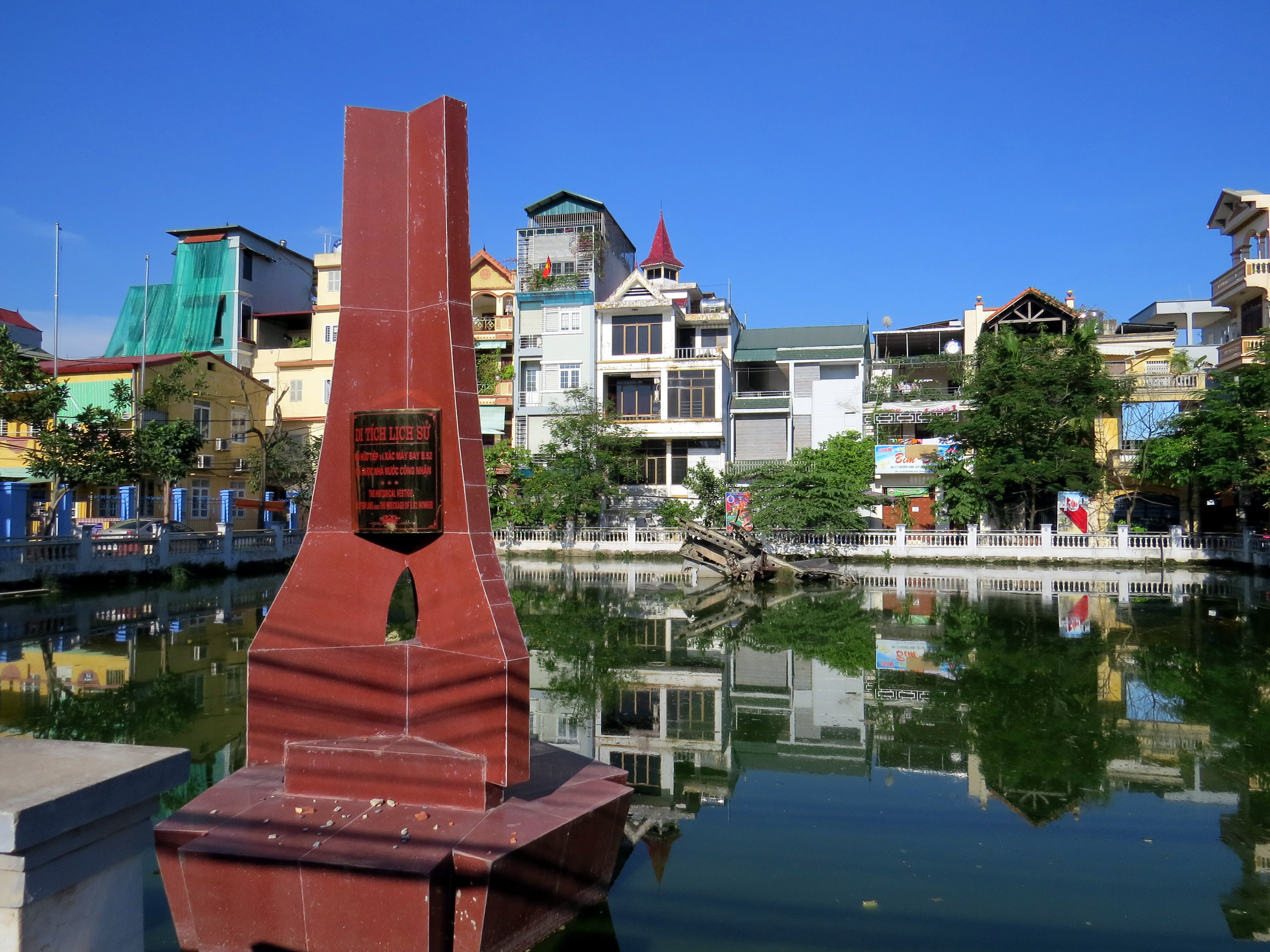
- Hữu Tiệp Lake.
- Interactive map of Ngọc Hà Ward
- Country: Vietnam
- Region: Red River Delta
- Municipality: Hanoi
- Established: 2005
- Headquarters of UBND: Lane 24, Alley 173, Hoàng Hoa Thám Street, Ngọc Hà ward

Ngọc Hà is a ward of Hanoi, the capital municipality of Vietnam, in the Red River Delta.

Ngọc Hà was a village forming part of Thăng Long, and was known for flower cultivation.
