= Saigon Hotpot =

Non-profit organisation in Vietnam

- Saigon Hotpot logo
- Formation: 11 November 2006; 19 years ago
- Founded at: Ho Chi Minh City, Vietnam
- Location: Ho Chi Minh City, Vietnam
- Website: saigonhotpot.vn

Saigon Hotpot (Vietnamese: Lẩu Sài Gòn) is a non-profit organisation in Ho Chi Minh City, Vietnam. Founded in 2006 by local university students, the club conducts free tours for foreign tourists, ranging from city tours to food tours. It aims to present Vietnam as an inviting nation for people from abroad, while helping its members improve their English language skills. Prospective members progress through several evaluation rounds and training sessions before leading tours.

Saigon Hotpot does tours in the city centre and Chợ Lớn (Chinatown). The group leads tours in more remote districts such as Cần Giờ and Củ Chi as well as to a few adjacent provinces and the Mekong Delta. The group raises funds through holding auctions.

== History ==
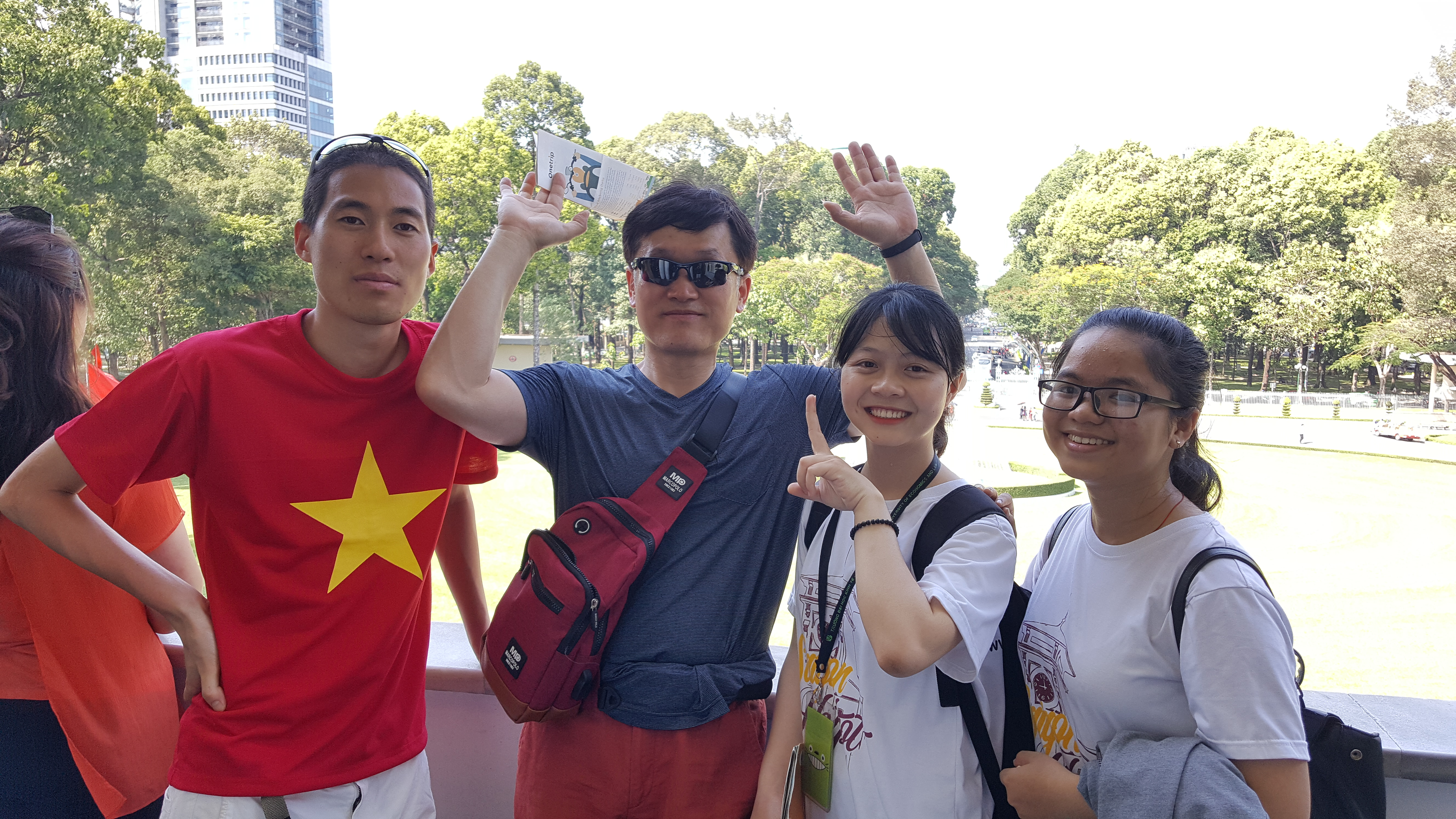
Saigon Hotpot guides leading a city tour in 2018

Saigon Hotpot was established on 11 November 2006 by 11 students from Ho Chi Minh City University of Social Sciences and Humanities, Ho Chi Minh University of Banking, University of Economics Ho Chi Minh City and Ho Chi Minh City University of Education after they connected while participating in an international volunteering initiative. Nguyễn Thị Phương Linh, the group's leader and a student at Ho Chi Minh City University of Education, brought the members together to found the organisation. The group leads free tours in Ho Chi Minh City. The group's name was inspired by the founding members' shared love of hot pot and by the way the dish depends on numerous spices just as each group member plays a lively, unique role. According to a group member, the name reflects both the volunteers' diverse origins across the country and the organisation's aim to make a distinctive mark on Saigon. Since each of the group's founding members was majoring in foreign languages, they were able to speak various languages including Chinese, English, French, Japanese, Korean and Thai. The group's purpose is to strengthen their proficiency in a foreign language, to share the culture of Vietnam with their guests, and to gain knowledge of international cultures. Organised as a non-profit organisation, the group chose the slogan "Your Smile is Our Success" as they aimed to present Vietnam as an inviting nation for foreigners.

As a large number of the founding members were in their last year in university, they distributed work items among themselves to avoid disruption to their academic work. Early group members reviewed books, news magazines, and websites to supply useful guidance to tourists. To teach visitors about the culture of Vietnam, they invited them to private residences to try the local cuisine and presented them with keepsakes like a piece of calligraphy. Initially, few people went on the group's tours. To help with marketing its tours, members of the group were required to make a weekly payment of VND5,000 (US$0.31) in 2007. They raised funds by selling handcrafted jewellery and greeting cards. To bring awareness to their tour services, members reached out to tourists interested in Vietnam through blogs, travel websites and websites for overseas students. The group launched advertising campaigns, passed out fliers, and started partnerships with hotels to promote their tours. In mid-2007, founding member Lâm Thị Thúy Hà, a student in the Oriental Studies department at the Ho Chi Minh City University of Social Sciences and Humanities, took over as the group's leader from Nguyễn, who had graduated and joined the workforce. Under Lâm's leadership, the group broadened its scope beyond leading tours into hosting fundraisers for orphanages and parties for disadvantaged children during Christmas and Mid-Autumn Festival. In 2012, the Center for Community Service Initiatives gave Saigon Hotpot the Socially Responsible Business Award.

== Tours and services ==
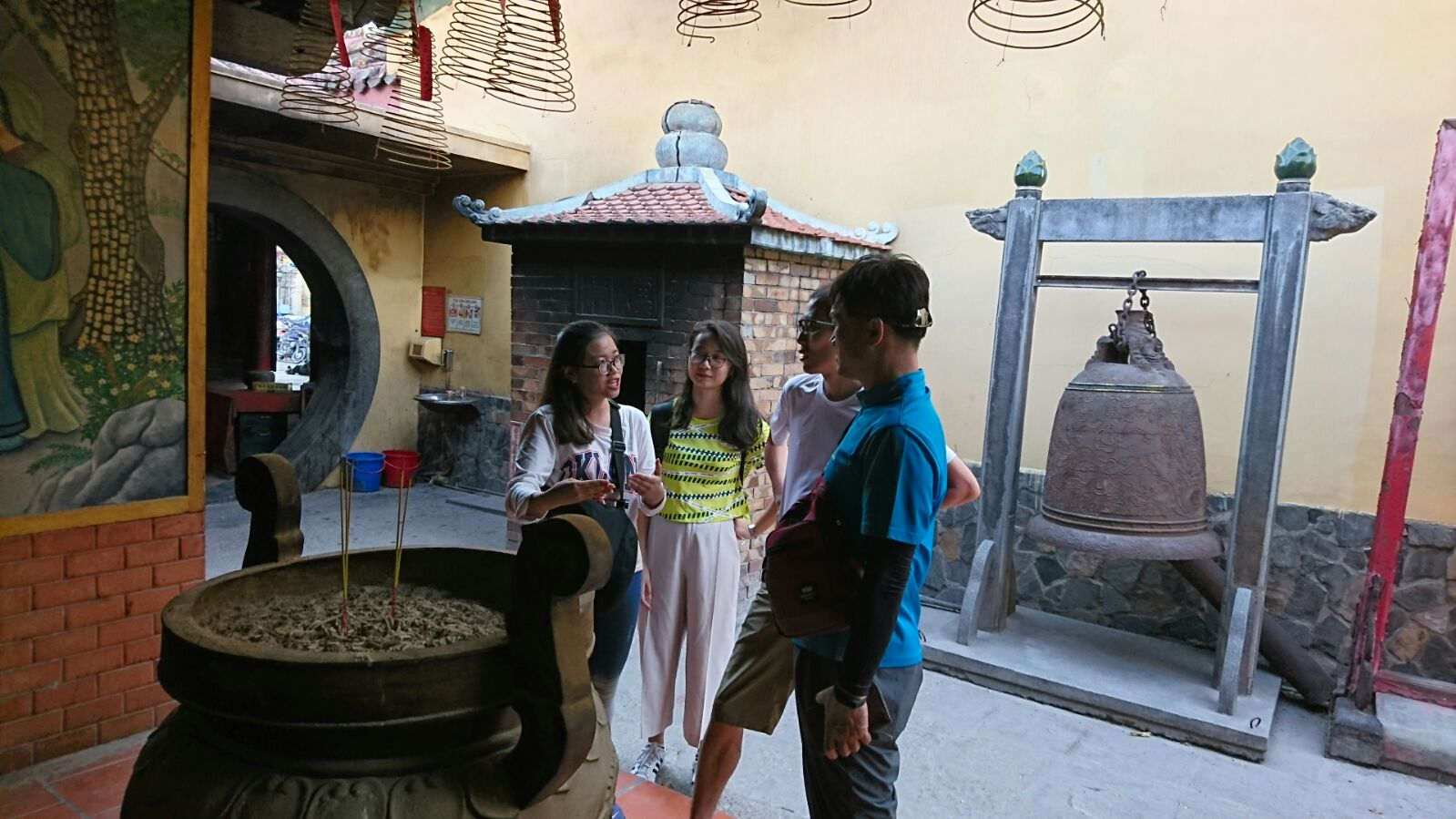
Saigon Hotpot guides with tourists at Nhi Phu Temple in 2018

Saigon Hotpot offers free tours to tourists. People typically hear about the organisation through friends' referrals, TripAdvisor, and the company's website. Tourists need to reserve their tours at least five to seven days in advance. After picking a desired date and tour itinerary, a tourist submits an online form. Saigon Hotpot emails the visitor with confirmation outlining who will lead the tour, the itinerary details, and the schedule. Tours generally have a duration of between two and three hours and can start any time during the day, while food tours last between 5:00 pm and 9:00 pm. They bring tourists to An Dong Market, Bến Dược Memorial Temple, Bến Thành Market, Ho Thi Ky Flower Market, the Independence Palace, Notre-Dame Cathedral Basilica of Saigon, the Saigon Central Post Office, and the War Remnants Museum, in Ho Chi Minh City. (Note: For An Dong Market; For Bến Dược Memorial Temple; For Bến Thành Market; For Ho Thi Ky Flower Market; For the Independence Palace; For Notre-Dame Cathedral Basilica of Saigon; For the Saigon Central Post Office; For the War Remnants Museum) They lead tours in Chợ Lớn (Chinatown), showing tourists Chinese temples and explaining Chinese mythology. Outside of the city centre, they lead tours in more remote districts like Cần Giờ and Củ Chi. Outside of the city, Saigon Hotpot brings tourists to a few adjacent provinces and the Mekong Delta.

The club ran traditional cooking tours, where tourists participated in preparing dishes like water spinach, canh chua soup made of cá lóc fish, bánh cuốn (rice noodle rolls), and chả giò (fried egg roll). Called "A Purely Vietnamese Day" (Ngày thuần Việt), the food events took place once a month and could accommodate between five and 15 tourists who did not need to pay anything. Members accompanied tourists to markets, returned home to cook, and ate the food together. The group's aim was to allow tourists to take part in a household experience through partaking in a home-cooked Vietnamese meal. Saigon Hotpot offers food tours that let tourists sample street food and experience Vietnamese cuisine from the north and south. All of the group's tours are free for tourists, who need to cover the transportation and food costs.

In 2007, group members led tourists on a Tết (Vietnamese New Year) tour. They arranged Tết activities such as visiting a Tết market, wrapping bánh chưng, putting together the five-fruit tray, and spending time together on New Year's Eve. Their 2007 Tết programme was attended by 14 tourists: eight Americans, four Taiwanese, and two Australians. On International Volunteer Day in 2014, the group took part as volunteer guides for international visitors as they navigated Ho Chi Minh City. Saigon Hotpot hosts free activities for foreign children. In 2022, members led a tour at the Museum of Traditional Medicine in District 10 for international students between the ages of six and 12. The students were taught about plants used in traditional Vietnamese medicine such as bitter melon, liquorice, and lemongrass. Saigon Hotpot runs a cultural exchange programme for international students visiting the country. In 2018, the group hosted international students from Florida International University. Using the theme "Vibrant Mekong", members taught the students about living on the Mekong such as the clothing, food, and music.

Every year during the Mid-Autumn Festival, Saigon Hotpot puts on the charity event Sky Lantern to raise funds for disadvantaged children. The fundraiser's yearly proceeds typically range from VND40 million (US$1,950) to VND100 million (US$4,876). For 2011 event, Saigon Hotpot hosted an auction where 150 items were available for bidding. The singer Đức Tuấn donated an antique clock from Prague, and it was purchased for VND5.5 million (US$268). The funds were used to provide books to a primary school in Bình Phước province. The Mid-Autumn Festival party for the children took place at a primary school in the Lộc Ninh district of Bình Phước province in 2012, having been funded by an event in which the group sold handmade goods. Saigon Hotpot hosts events at orphanages and puts on Christmas parties for children who are underprivileged.

== Structure and operations ==
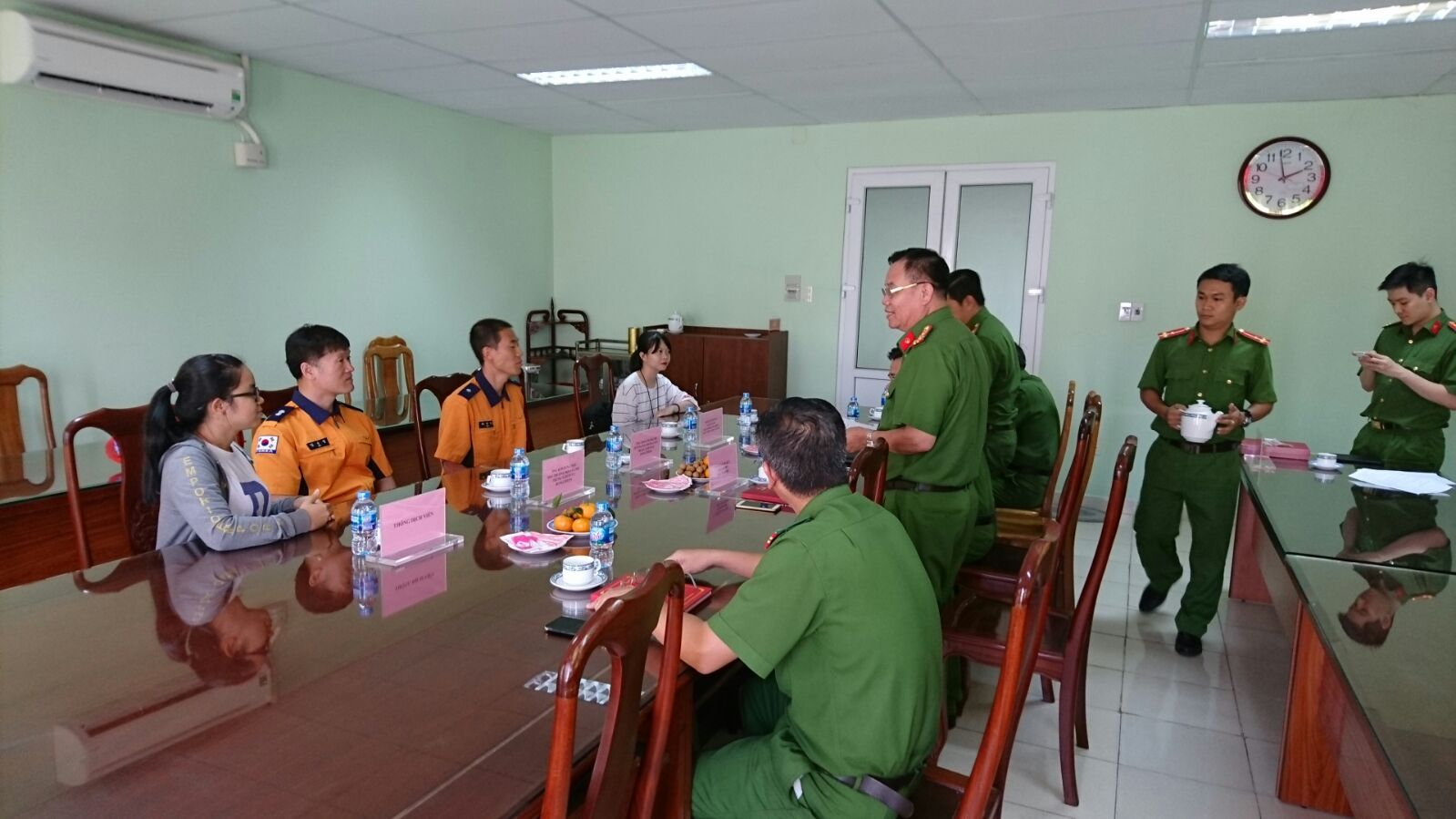
South Korean firefighters visited Ho Chi Minh City in 2018 with Saigon Hotpot members acting as translators

All of the group's members are students. In 2009, joining the club involved five rounds: a background screening, an online exam, a cultural knowledge and artistic expression aptitude assessment, a real-life tour evaluation, and final selection. In 2014, the application process included sending in a short video introducing a tourist site, taking part in collaborative games and answering questions. A student interested in becoming a Saigon Hotpot member must submit an application and then undergo several interview stages including presentations and evaluations of tour guiding abilities. New members undergo three months of training. Members receive training to assist guests who encounter aggressive vendors or who have food allergies or stomach aches. If a tourist asks a female member to join them for drinks and go back to the hotel at the end of a tour, she is trained to tactfully decline. Guests who make such requests multiple times are barred from future tours.

In 2007, Saigon Hotpot led more than 200 visitors on over 80 tours, and by July 2008, its volunteers had conducted more than 400 tours. In 2014, the group had 105 members from various Ho Chi Minh City universities, and by 2016, it had grown to almost 200 members.

== See also ==
- Hanoikids
