= Southeastern Armed Forces Museum Military Zone 7 =

- Bảo tàng Lực lượng Vũ trang miền Đông Nam Bộ (Quân khu 7)
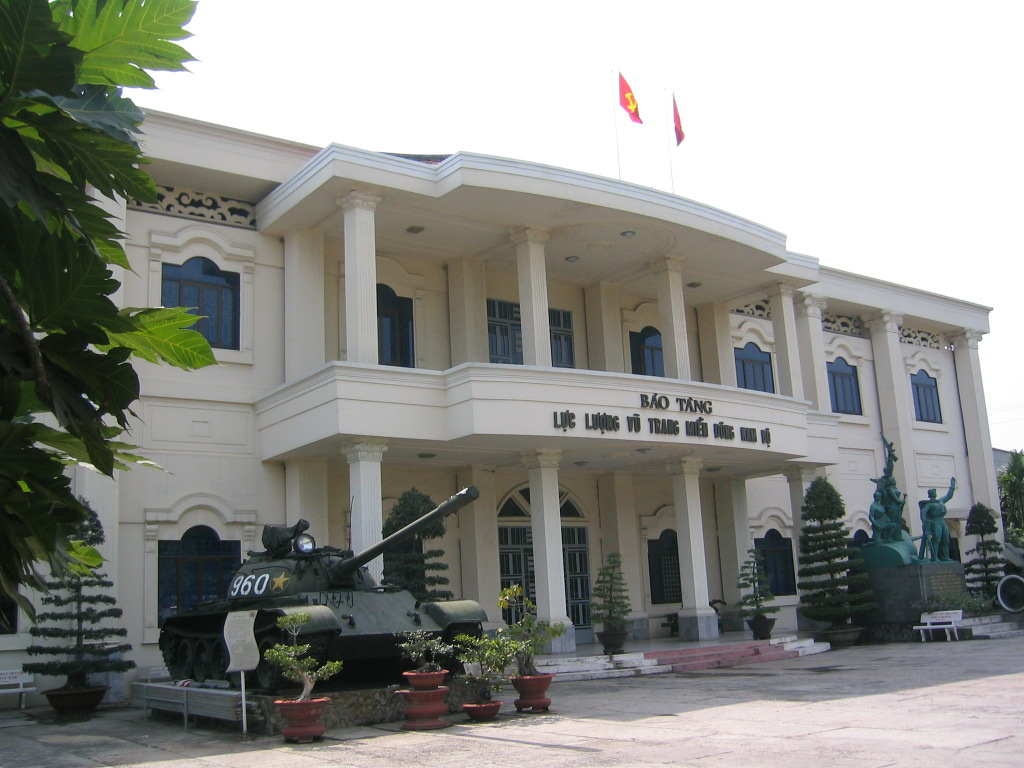
- Museum main building
- Established: 5 February 1988
- Location: 247 Hoàng Văn Thụ Street, Tân Sơn Hòa, Ho Chi Minh City, Vietnam
- Coordinates: 10.8°N 106.666°E
- Type: Military museum
- Director: Colonel Nguyen Duy Thieu
- Owner: Government of Vietnam

The Southeastern Armed Forces Museum Military Zone 7 is a military museum located at 247 Hoàng Văn Thụ Street, Tân Sơn Hòa (Tân Bình district), Ho Chi Minh City, Vietnam. It covers all Vietnamese resistance to foreign occupation from the Chinese occupation, the First Indochina War and the Vietnam War and the Cambodian–Vietnamese War.

The Museum's opening hours are from 07:30 to 11:30 and from 13:00 to 16:30 daily except Monday. Admission is free for Vietnamese and 40,000 VND for non-Vietnamese, plus VND 10,000 to take photos.

== History ==
The museum was established on 5 February 1988 on the site of the former U.S. 3rd Field Hospital and is diagonally opposite the former ARVN Joint General Staff compound, now the headquarters of 7th Military Region (Vietnam People's Army).

The buildings were originally built for the American Community School in Saigon in 1958/9, however when US dependents were ordered to leave South Vietnam in February 1965, the vacated buildings became available for use by the 3rd Field Hospital. The hospital was conveniently located near to Tan Son Nhut Air Base allowing for transfer of casualties within South Vietnam and the medical evacuation of casualties to other US hospital facilities in the Pacific.

== Exhibits ==
The museum comprises two main sections: an outdoor display of large military equipment and a military museum.

=== Outdoor display ===
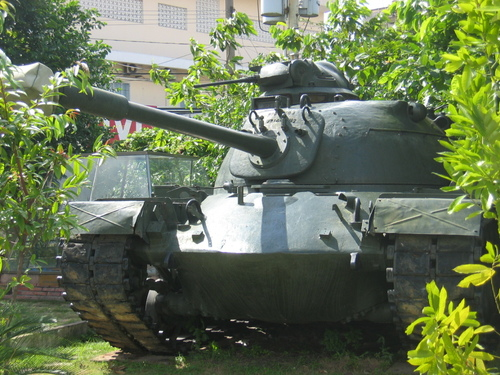
M48

Items on display comprise:

- M-30 122mm howitzer
- M41 tank
- M48A3 tank
- M107 Self-Propelled Gun
- M113 armoured personnel carrier
- M114 155 mm howitzer
- T-54 tank
- model of the Tet Offensive attack on the U.S. Embassy

=== Military Museum ===
Displays include:

- Memorials to the leaders and heroes of the Zone 7 Military
- Model of several rooms in the Cu Chi Tunnels

== See also ==
- Vietnam People's Air Force Museum, Ho Chi Minh City
- War Remnants Museum
