= Culinary Adventure Co. =

Canadian culinary tourism company

Culinary Adventure Co. is a culinary tourism and food tour company based in Toronto, Ontario, Canada. It was founded in 2010 by Tania Daviduke. Since 2014, it has been owned and operated by Kevin Durkee, who previously owned the cheese-themed Toronto restaurant Cheesewerks. Culinary Adventure Co. is one of Canada's largest provider of culinary tour services.

== Services ==
As of October 2018, Culinary Adventure Co. offers cultural walking food tours in Winnipeg, Toronto, Ottawa, Halifax, Kingston, and Charlottetown. The tours are guided by local culinary professionals. In 2013, the company was awarded a Canadian Signature Experience designation from the Canadian tourism department, for its Escape the city: Canoe Paddle + Culinary Adventure.

In June 2017, Culinary Adventure Co. partnered with Ritz-Carlton to offer tours exclusively for the hotel's guests. That month, Durkee and a chef from the Ritz-Carlton went on a one-day tasting tour to six Canadian cities, traveling from coast-to-coast in 24 hours to create a "Taste of Canada" menu. The Metro News described the event as "The Great Canadian Food Race".

== Reviews ==
Toronto.com listed Culinary Adventure Co. first in its "Best Food Tours in Toronto", calling it "a nice balance with its choice of stops and local trivia". A writer for Forbes named the company's tour of Toronto's Chinatown and Kensington Market as one of the world's "9 Best Food Tours".
