= Hanoikids =

Non-profit organisation in Hanoi, Vietnam

- Hanoikids Voluntary English Club
- Hanoikids logo featuring the "Be A Little Ambassador of Hanoi" slogan
- Abbreviation: HNK
- Formation: 22 May 2006; 19 years ago
- Founded at: Hanoi, Vietnam
- Location: Hanoi, Vietnam
- Website: hanoikids.org
- Formerly called: Hanoi Friends

Hanoikids Voluntary English Club (HNK) is a non-profit organisation in Hanoi, Vietnam. Founded in 2006 by local university students, the club conducts free tours for foreign tourists, ranging from food tours to motorbike tours. It aims to promote cultural exchange while helping its members improve their English communication skills. Prospective members progress through several evaluation rounds and training sessions before leading tours.

Participants from around 20 nations have gone on the tours. Among the people who have taken the tours are foreign dignitaries. Tripadvisor awarded Hanoikids a Certificate of Excellence in 2012. The Ho Chi Minh Communist Youth Union's Central Committee, in collaboration with the United Nations Volunteers programme, gave the club a National Volunteer Award in 2013.

== History ==
On 22 May 2006, participants in the Vietnamese Internet forum Trái Tim Việt Nam (lit. 'Vietnam's Hearts') discussed founding a club that would lead international tourists on no-cost tours. The discussion was initiated by a forum member who described how he had led a Canadian couple on a complimentary tour. Students from Foreign Trade University noticed that youth strolling around Hoàn Kiếm Lake in search of foreigners to talk to—a practice known as "foreigner hunting"—could find such opportunities through a newly established club. The club Hanoi Friends was founded by 10 young people, including students from Foreign Trade University, three days later on 25 May 2006 after they gathered face-to-face to plan its creation. The club later was renamed to Hanoikids. It adopted the new name to convey a carefree, youthful vibe to its foreign guests. Organised as a non-profit, the club is a non-governmental organisation operated by students. In 2008, Hanoikids began collaborating with the Global Village Foundation to share Vietnamese culture internationally and partner with other Vietnamese clubs with similar missions.

At the beginning of the club's history, members sought to advertise it to international visitors. They began by passing out fliers in downtown Hanoi and at Hoàn Kiếm Lake. They visited travel agencies, airports, and hotels, where they put up posters and distributed promotional materials. However, their initial efforts were met with resistance as hotel security and airport police asked them to leave. Several Hanoikids members were detained at Noi Bai International Airport for passing out fliers and were let go after extensive appeals and explanations. They next turned to marketing themselves on online travel forums including Lonely Planet and Tripadvisor and emailed foreign universities to share information about the club. After these efforts, a group of Dutch tourists became the first to arrange a tour with them. In its early days, Hanoikids had so few guests that even when a tour had two or three guests, numerous club members would accompany them as guides. The club members gained experience through practice sessions with one another.

College students in Hanoi led complimentary tours to enhance their English proficiency, prompting the creation of numerous student organizations to support the initiative. According to Mae Chan of The Edge, Hanoikids is "the most established" such group. Multiple cities in Vietnam—including Da Nang and Ho Chi Minh City—have adopted the Hanoikids approach. The club markets its offerings as being "zero dong" tours, and its slogans are "No tips, no charge" and "Be more than a tourist". Club members market themselves as "Ambassadors of Hanoi" and as "travel mates" rather than "tour guides". In 2013, the club promoted Vietnamese culture by making videos about Hanoi's pho and tea, ca trù (musical storytelling), and the Tô Ngọc Vân painting Girl with White Lilies. Around 2013, the group considered introducing paid tours to offer more services but unanimously decided against that. In 2013, scammers set up fraudulent websites across numerous domain names, mimicking the content on Hanoikids' website. The scammers collected money from tourists who voiced complaints about the poor quality tours. Hanoikids published a letter stating that the fake websites were scams. The group organised Culture Puzzle, a set of meetups in 2016 in which club members and foreign guests could make classic Vietnamese toys together. During the COVID-19 pandemic in Vietnam, membership dwindled and the tour count was inconsistent. By 2022, the club had restarted activities, supported by a freshly trained team of 800 members.

International dignitaries have taken tours with Hanoikids. Julia Gillard, the Prime Minister of Australia, went on a Hanoikids tour in 2010. Bob Carr, the Australian Minister for Foreign Affairs, and Ron Kirk, the United States Trade Representative, did Hanoikids tours in 2010, while Jack Lew, the United States Secretary of the Treasury, went on a tour in 2013. The American general Herbert J. Carlisle and the American senator Patrick Leahy took Hanoikids tours in 2014. Leahy told his tour guides about his cameo appearances in multiple Batman films and gifted them coins containing his personal seal.

== Tours ==
Hanoikids offers free tours of Hanoi to tourists, running them seven days a week. The tours span either the entire day or a partial day, taking place in the morning, afternoon, or evening. The club runs food tours in the Old Quarter and motorbike tours. Guests must secure the tour reservations in advance. A Hanoikid vice president explained that English education in Vietnam focuses mainly on grammar and vocabulary, so many students earn excellent grades but struggle to speak the language in daily life. The tours are led by Hanoikids members, who aim to strengthen their command of the English language since it is a vital skill for young professionals entering the job market. The members, who are all secondary school or university students, are largely 20 years old.

Generally, each tour is led by two students. The students aim to share the culture of Vietnam with their guests and discuss their experiences at home and in the classroom. The guides instruct visitors on the proper way to cross streets teeming with numerous motorbikes, buses, and cars, and where the stoplights are scarce. They bring tourists to the Temple of Literature, the Ho Chi Minh Mausoleum, Hỏa Lò Prison, the Vietnam Museum of Ethnology, and Hoàn Kiếm Lake. The guests cover tour expenses like dining and transport. Hanoikids has a policy in which a guest's phone number is shared solely with the member who answered the guest's email. To ensure their guests' privacy, members are prohibited from messaging the guests while the tour is ongoing. The tour guides do not take compensation or gratuities. They receive small keepsakes that guests occasionally offer as well as any donations to Hanoikids to support its operating expenses.

The majority of their guests have not been to Hanoi before. The tours attract participants from around 20 nations such as Australia, Canada, France, Indonesia, Malaysia, New Zealand, Singapore, the United Kingdom, and the United States. By 2014, almost 400 tourists every month took part in the club's roughly 170 tours. By that time, more than 15,000 foreign tourists had taken part in over 7,000 tours arranged by Hanoikids. In 2016, the club conducted over 10 tours each day, rising to over 20 tours per day during the busiest travel periods.

== Structure and operations ==
In 2009, Hanoikids members spent the first and second Sundays of each month at Hanoi's tourist attractions for training sessions. The remaining Sundays were spent on learning, practicing specific topics, and recruiting new members. The group arranged seminars where members discussed topics ranging from Hanoi cuisine to body language to international cultures. Hanoikids had around 20 monthly sign-ups in 2009. Candidates became certified members after they finished the training classes and demonstrated competence in English, communication, and presentation. Only between five and 10 people in 2009 fulfilled the criteria for membership out of 20 sign-ups.

VietNamNet said in 2014 that Hanoikids was among Vietnam's largest volunteer clubs. Hanoikids had more than 600 members in 2016, of which 100 played an active role. That year, it had six departments: Tour Operations, Public Relations, Internal Relations, External Relations, Training, and Design & Art. The club is led by a president and a vice president. In the October 2014 application cycle, almost 1,000 people applied to join the group, of which only 50 were selected once they cleared three rounds of evaluations. In the initial round, candidates respond to a standard questionnaire. If they pass that, candidates do an on-site collaborative test typically consisting of a game and a team presentation. In the final round, candidates are interviewed. Hanoikids admits fresh recruits twice annually, selecting 40 to 45 people each time. New entrants receive two months of training. They are guided by seasoned tour guides who take 10 recent joiners to various locations to coach them and evaluate their grasp of the material. To build their communication skills, the new recruits present before public audiences. Accompanied by an experienced member, a new recruit does two evaluative tours when the training is over. They attain full membership after passing that evaluation. A quarterly minimum of 10 tours is mandatory for every new member, and noncompliance leads to a caution or club dismissal.

In their first year, members are required to be actively leading tours. After one year, members have the option to keep conducting tours or become inactive. Experienced members of the club are called "oldies". When new members join the group, they are assigned to a gờ led by an "oldie" who supports the group members in building connections as they acquire valuable information for leading tours. After joining the club, members receive playful nicknames like Đào, Hành, Iris, Khỉ, Lúp, Mèo, Vie, and Xubi. They use those names so frequently that they no longer remember fellow members' actual names. Every year, club members go on trips including to celebrate the club's birthday and homecoming day.

== Awards and reception ==
Tripadvisor awarded the club a Certificate of Excellence in 2012 and included it in its "Things to do in Hanoi" list. In collaboration with the United Nations Volunteers programme, the Ho Chi Minh Communist Youth Union's Central Committee gave Hanoikids a National Volunteer Award in 2013, one of 10 groups to be granted the award that year. In the "Job prize" category, Hanoikids received a 2014 nomination for the Bùi Xuân Phái award named "For the Love of Hanoi". The journalist writer Emily Maguire said that newcomers to Hanoi can be taken aback by the city's nerve-racking traffic, tortuous Old Quarter, and its unusual way of numbering streets. She recommended that "a great way to get your bearings" is through a Hanoikids tour. Vũ Thơ of Thanh Niên said that Hanoikids allows tourists to "experience real life in the most natural and intimate way" and has garnered numerous appreciative comments from travellers. According to the travel writer Dana Filek-Gibson, the tour guides are "enthusiastic and outgoing, making the experience feel more like a friendly outing than a run-of-the-mill tour".

== See also ==
- Saigon Hotpot
- Tourism in Hanoi
