= Air Force Museum =

Air Force Museum may refer to:

== Asia ==
- Air Force Museum of New Zealand in Wigram Aerodrome, Christchurch, New Zealand
- Indian Air Force Museum, Palam
- Republic of China Air Force Museum in Kaohsiung, Taiwan
- Sri Lanka Air Force Museum in Sri Lanka
- Vietnamese People's Air Force Museum, Hanoi in Vietnam
- Vietnamese People's Air Force Museum, Saigon in Vietnam

== Other locations ==
- Comox Air Force Museum in Comox, British Columbia, Canada
- Italian Air Force Museum in Vigna di Valle, Italy
- Royal Air Force Museum in Colindale in north London and at RAF Cosford in Shropshire, England
- South African Air Force Museum in South Africa

== See also ==
- National Museum of the United States Air Force in Wright-Patterson Air Force Base, near Dayton, Ohio, US
