= Vietnam People's Air Force Museum =

- Vietnam People's Air Force Museum, Ho Chi Minh City
- Vietnam People's Air Force Museum, Hanoi
