= American Community School in Saigon =

International school in Ho Chi Minh City, Vietnam

The American Community School in Saigon was created in 1954, providing American style schooling for the dependent children of Americans working for U.S. government organizations in Saigon, South Vietnam (now a part of Ho Chi Minh City of the Socialist Republic of Vietnam). Some of those organizations included the U.S. Embassy, the U.S. aid mission (USOM), the U.S. Information Service (USIS), and the Military Assistance Advisory Group (MAAG). The school also accepted for enrollment the dependent children of private American firms operating in Saigon, as well as some non-U.S. diplomatic families. Some Vietnamese children also attended the school. The school grew rapidly as U.S. involvement in the Vietnam War escalated, but was permanently closed in February 1965 when all dependents of U.S. government personnel were ordered out of Vietnam by President Lyndon Johnson.

== Overview of school history ==
The American Community School (ACS) in Saigon had its beginning in 1954, providing schooling for younger dependent children of American government employees and military personnel stationed there. In 1957 it expanded to include high school students and continued to grow rapidly as more U.S. government and military advisory personnel were committed to South Vietnam.

By order of President Lyndon Johnson, dependents of U.S. diplomatic, aid mission, and military personnel were ordered to leave Vietnam in February 1965. Evacuation of the dependents had been a matter of concern for the administration for more than a year. Some dependents apparently left on passenger planes that were sent on to Saigon after having delivered Marine Corps troops deployed to Danang, where a HAWK air defense battalion was put in place to defend nearby American air assets. Having lost the bulk of its enrollment, as well as most of the teaching staff (many of whom were U.S. dependent wives with teaching credentials), the school closed its doors.

Dependents of Americans working for private firms in Vietnam were not covered by the Presidential order, and so the education of those choosing to remain in Saigon was later provided by several private schools established in Saigon after the evacuation. One of these schools was called the “Phoenix Study Group”, whose students were described as “children of diplomats, wealthy businessmen and American civilians.” This follow-on school remained in existence until the fall of South Vietnam to forces of North Vietnam in April 1975.

== Instructional format ==
The teachers at ACS were, for the most part, wives of U.S. government employees stationed in Saigon. They possessed teaching certificates or degrees from American educational institutions. French language instruction was provided by qualified local French citizens. The elementary school classes were taught using the Calvert method. For the first several years, high school instruction was via correspondence course material graded by the high school division of the University of California. Consequently, the high school teachers generally served in the role of tutors rather than lecturing. But by the 1962-63 school year, ACS had grown to the status of a college preparatory high school with high academic standards. Testing programs showed that ACS high school students were at a level 20% higher than their contemporaries in Stateside schools.

== Growth and locations of the school ==
=== Home schooling ===
The school began in the Saigon home of the wife of a U.S. government employee, in 1954 (the year of the defeat of French military forces at Battle of Dien Bien Phu). Students were all younger elementary age children.

=== Norodom Compound ===
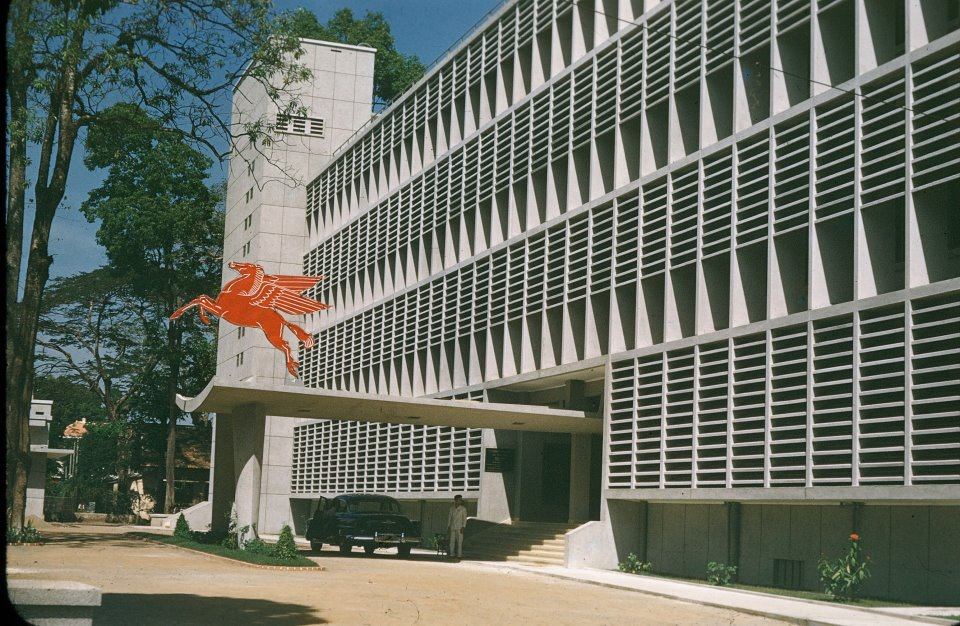
Stanvac building in Saigon, newly constructed in 1955 and temporary home for ACS

A second dependent wife soon joined in teaching elementary age students. This second class of pupils met in a small building in the Norodom Compound (one of several U.S. government facilities located in Saigon), situated near the Presidential Palace. The next academic year, two Quonset hut buildings were erected in the compound, and the home-schooled elementary school students joined those already at Norodom Compound. Shortly thereafter, near the end of 1955, one of the Quonset huts burned to the ground, and most of the students’ books were destroyed. While the hut was being rebuilt for the 1956-57 academic year (an additional and larger Quonset hut was also erected), the school temporarily moved into the newly built Stanvac building, which housed the Saigon headquarters for a Dutch-owned oil company's property. When the rebuilding in the Norodom Compound was complete, this expansion made it possible for the creation of a high school for American dependent children in Saigon.

Norodom Compound later became the site of the new multi-story U.S. Embassy that opened in 1967.

=== Tan Son Hoa ===
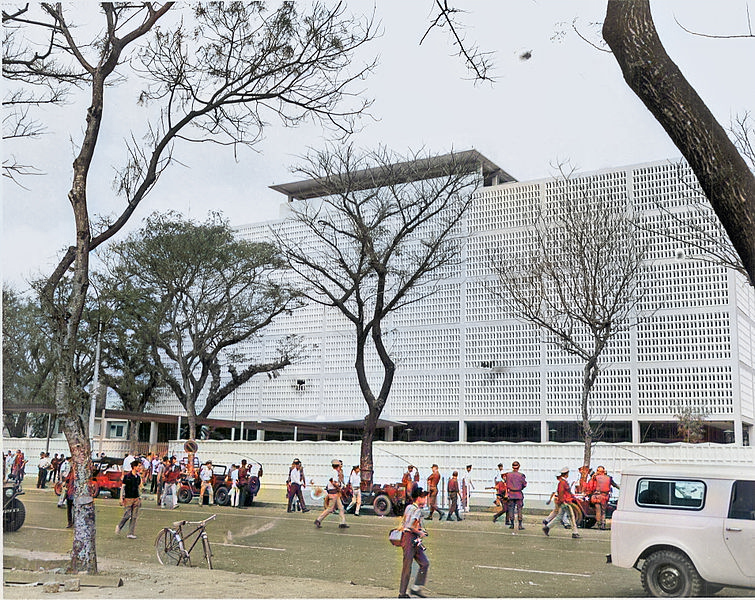
U.S. embassy building, built on the site of the old Norodom Compound, shown after the attack during the Tet Offensive in January 1968

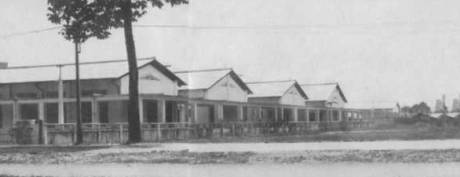
American Community School, Saigon, circa 1960

For the 1958-59 school year the school moved out of the Norodom Compound into newly built permanent buildings near Saigon’s Tan Son Nhat International Airport, at the street address 10 Tan Son Hoa (today the street address is 247 Hoang Van Thu). The extra space at this new location was quickly put to use as the school continued to expand, enrolling high school age children who previously had been sent to private boarding schools elsewhere (including the Philippines). At the beginning of the 1959-60 school year, the high school enrollment stood at 28 students, as noted in the school’s first yearbook (named The Gecko) that year. The following school year, 1960–61, a count of the number of high school students pictured in the second yearbook shows that the high school enrollment had doubled to at least 56. When opened for the 1958-59 school year, the school had 5 classroom wings. During the 1962-63 school year a 2-story wing was added.

In February 1965, the school was permanently closed when President Lyndon Johnson ordered all dependents of U.S. government and military personnel to be evacuated from Vietnam. Contemporaneous news accounts of that evacuation reported the enrollment of the school (both high school and elementary grades) to have been 750. An additional building wing had been completed the previous weekend, never to be occupied by any students of ACS.

== Later use of the ACS buildings ==
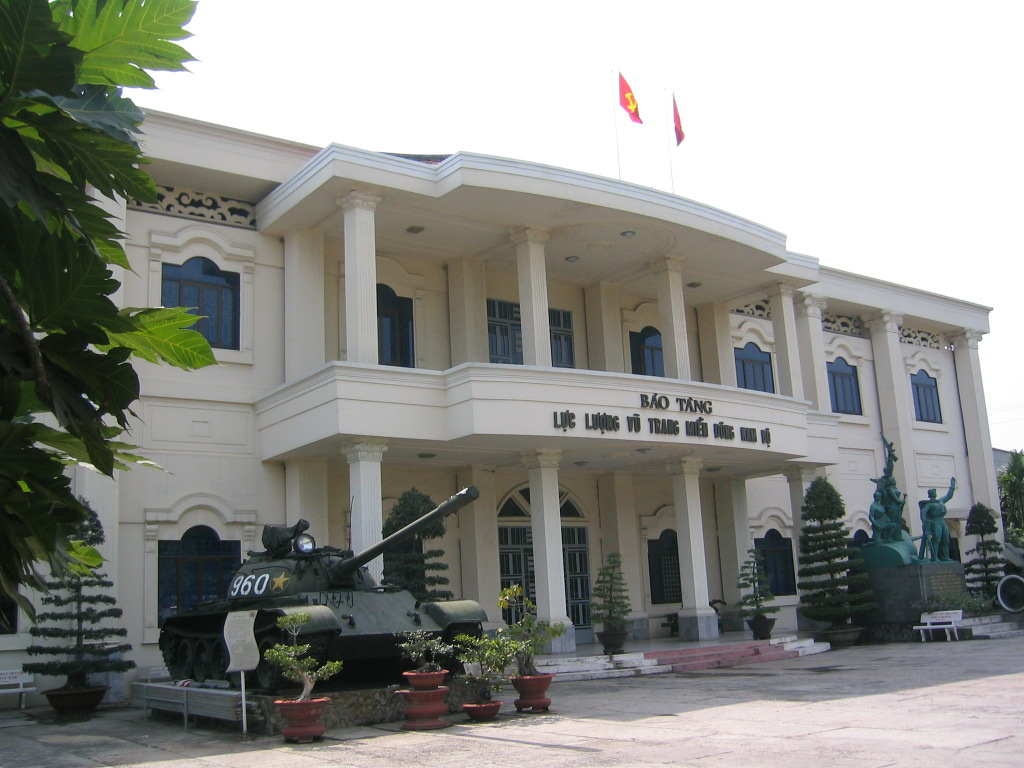
7th Military Zone Museum, circa 2004, courtesy of Tucker Smallwood

Within three months of the departure of U.S. government dependents from Saigon, and closing of the American Community School, the buildings that had been ACS were converted into a medical facility for the U.S. Army’s 3rd Field Hospital. The complex underwent extensive expansion and this hospital continued to function as a major military medical facility until 1973.

Upon departure of U.S. military forces after the Paris Peace Accords, the facility became a new location for the existing Saigon Adventist Hospital, remaining such until the fall of Saigon in April 1975.

The facilities are now occupied by the Southeastern Armed Forces Museum Military Zone 7.
