= Phú Mỹ Hưng =

Phú Mỹ Hưng may refer to several places in Ho Chi Minh City, Vietnam, including:

- Phú Mỹ Hưng (commune), a rural commune of Củ Chi District
- Phú Mỹ Hưng urban area, a planned community in District 7
- Phu My Hung Corporation, an urban infrastructure developer company
- Phú Mỹ Hưng Tower, an office building next to the Crescent Mall in the International Commercial & Finance of the eponymous urban area
