= Bến Dược Memorial Temple =

Vietnamese cultural building

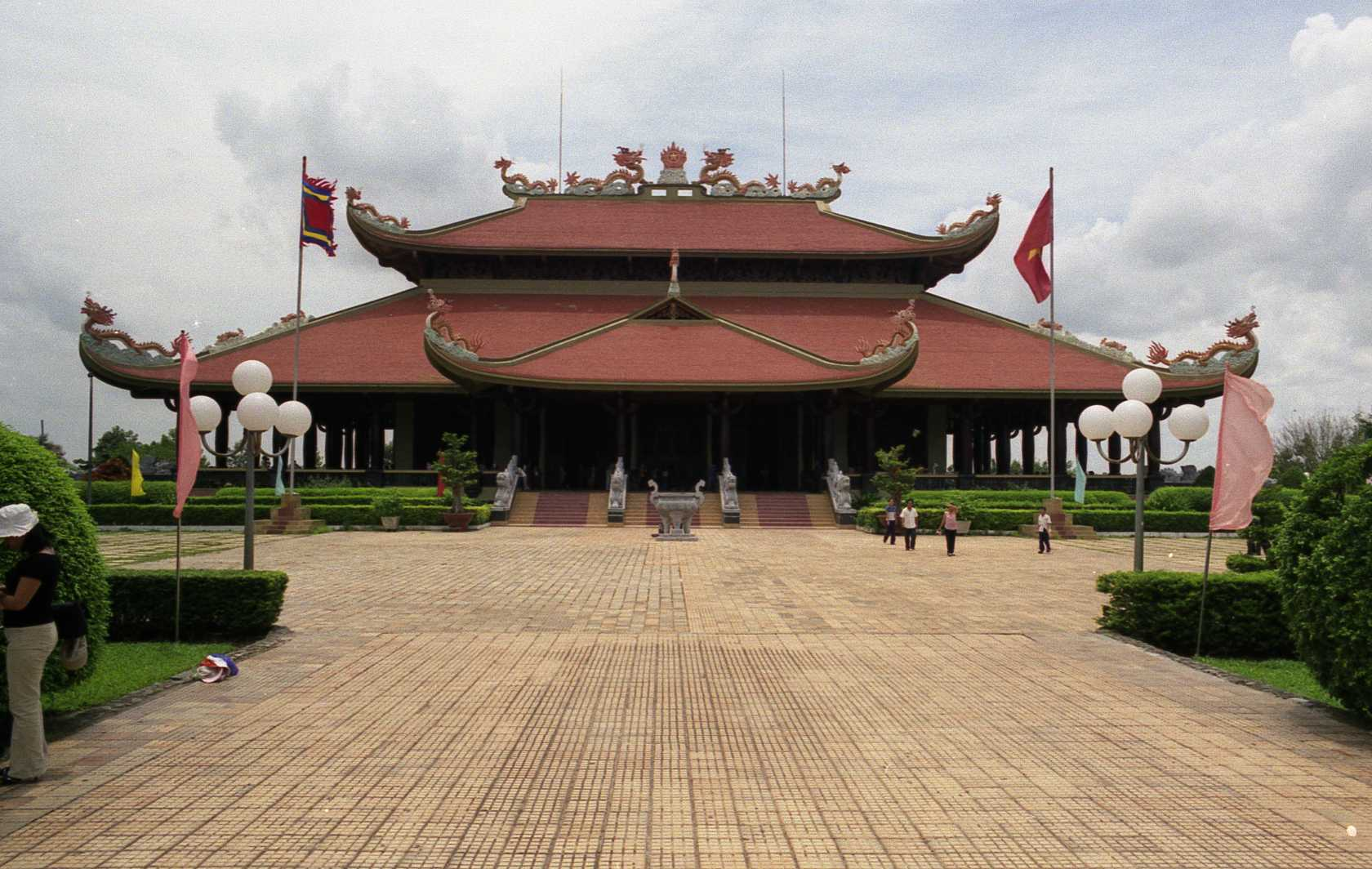
Bến Dược Temple

The Bến Dược Memorial Temple (Vietnamese: Đền tưởng niệm Bến Dược - Củ Chi) is a cultural history project by the Communist Party Committee and people of Ho Chi Minh City, Vietnam. It was built to memorialize the significant contributions of the soldiers and people who were killed in the Saigon-Gia Định region during the anti-American and anti-French fighting. The temple is situated at the Bến Dược hamlet, Phú Mỹ Hưng commune, at the end of the Củ Chi tunnels. It is located on a 7-hectare plot in a historical heritage compound.

On December 19, 1975, the first stage of the Memorial Monument was inaugurated to welcome many groups of people from inside and outside Vietnam to come to remember, burn incense, and meditate. The City Committee of the Party, the People's Council, and the Vietnamese Fatherland Front chose the date of December 19 as the annual memorial day to recall and be grateful to the dead. Construction of the temple was started on May 19, 1993 on the 103rd birthday of President Ho Chi Minh.

== Architecture ==
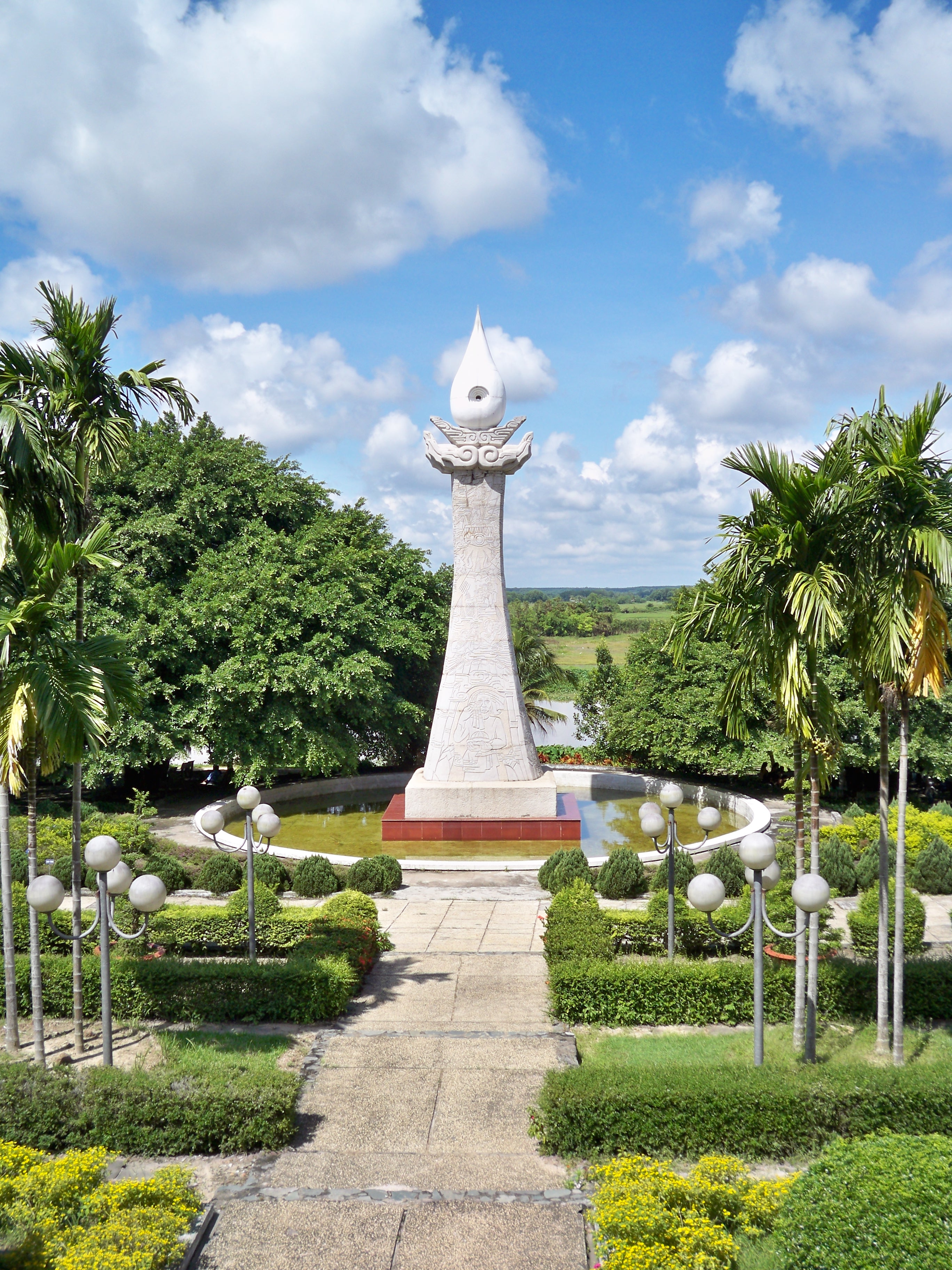
Monument behind Bến Dược Memorial Temple

The Bến Dược Memorial Temple includes the following items:

=== Tam quan gateway ===
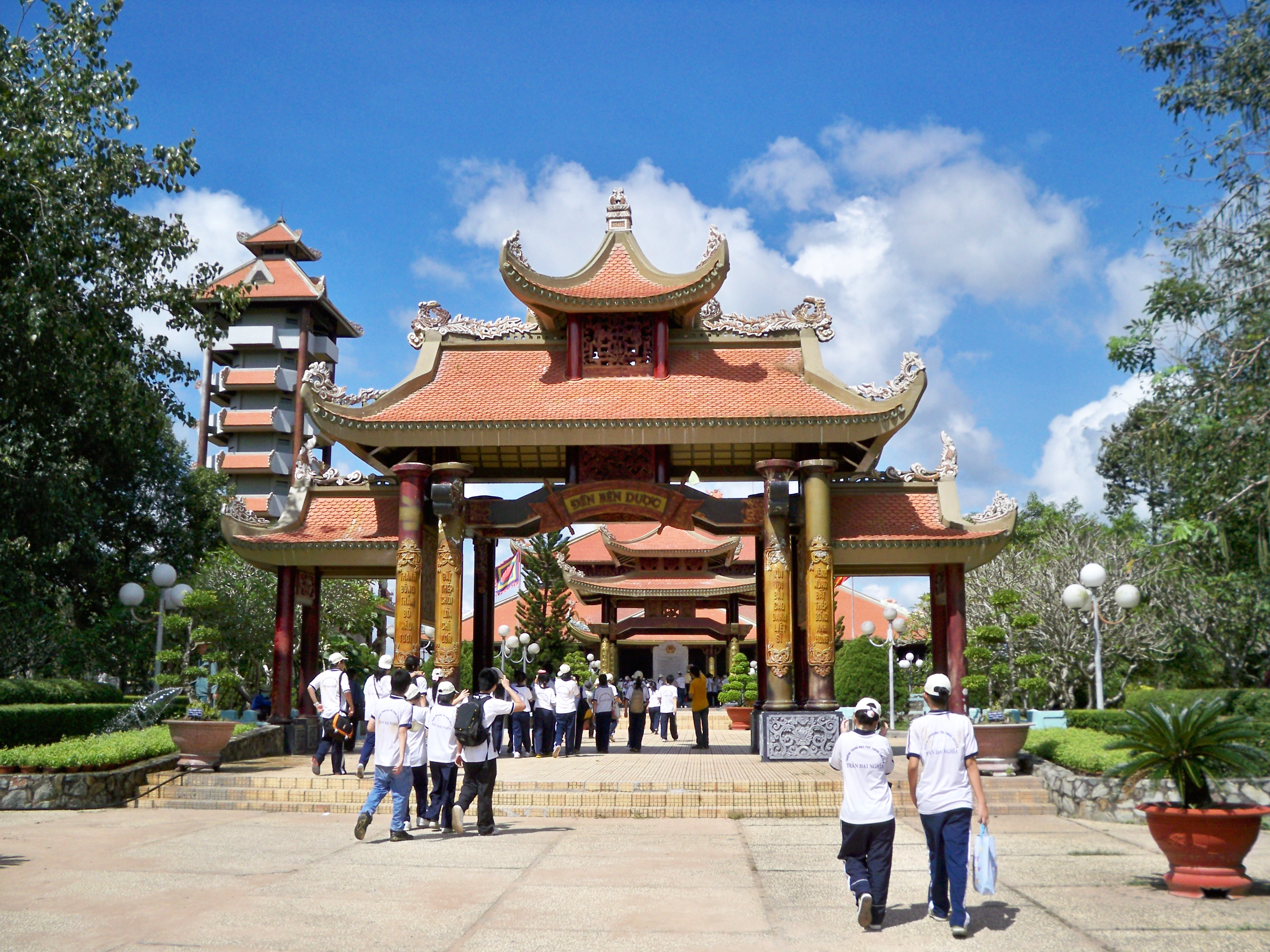
Tam quan gateway of Bến Dược Memorial Temple

Tam quan gateway has traditional style architecture with a line of round pillars, with the yin and yang tile. The gate has the curved designs and patterns of a village entrance but made with new materials. In the middle of Tam quan gateway is the signboard "Bến Dược Memorial Temple" and on the body of the pillars are the parallel sentences of the poet Bao Dinh Giang:

"Trải tấm lòng son vì đất nước,
Ðem dòng máu đỏ giữ quê hương."

=== The inscription house ===
The inscription house is a square house with double tile. In the middle is a stone tablet 3m high, 1.7m wide, and 0.25m thick and weighing 3.07 tons. This stone tablet is taken from one block of 18 ton stone from Ngũ Hành Sơn (Da Nang) and is carved by artisans with all kinds of unique patterns of the country

The writing carved on the stone tablet is titled "Eternally remember" of the poet Vien Phuong, which was chosen from a contest of 217 writings of 29 provinces and cities.

=== The main temple ===
The worship temple is organized in a U shape: the centre is the altar of country, in the middle is the statue of Ho Chi Minh, on the top written: "For the country, forger ourselves. Eternally remember." On the left and right are two incense-tables to remember our ancestors, people and unknown soldiers. Along the left wall is the name of dead soldiers of the Party, and the right wall is the name of dead soldiers of the armed forces.

The names of dead soldiers are carved into a granite stone tablet with gilded letters. There are 44,520 "revolutionary martyrs'" names carved in the temple including Vietnamese mothers, "heroes", and "revolutionary martyrs", including 9,322 "revolutionary martyrs" from other provinces and cities.

There are three monumental pictures made of China outside the main temple wall made by the University of Fine Arts, expressing the following content: People reclaim waste land to establish the country; To give strength to resist against the invaders; Oppressed people rise up to fight to achieve victory.

Individuals frequently come to the monument to look for the names of relatives and comrades. The temple management board is able to inform them about places of burial and other details of dead soldiers.

=== The tower ===
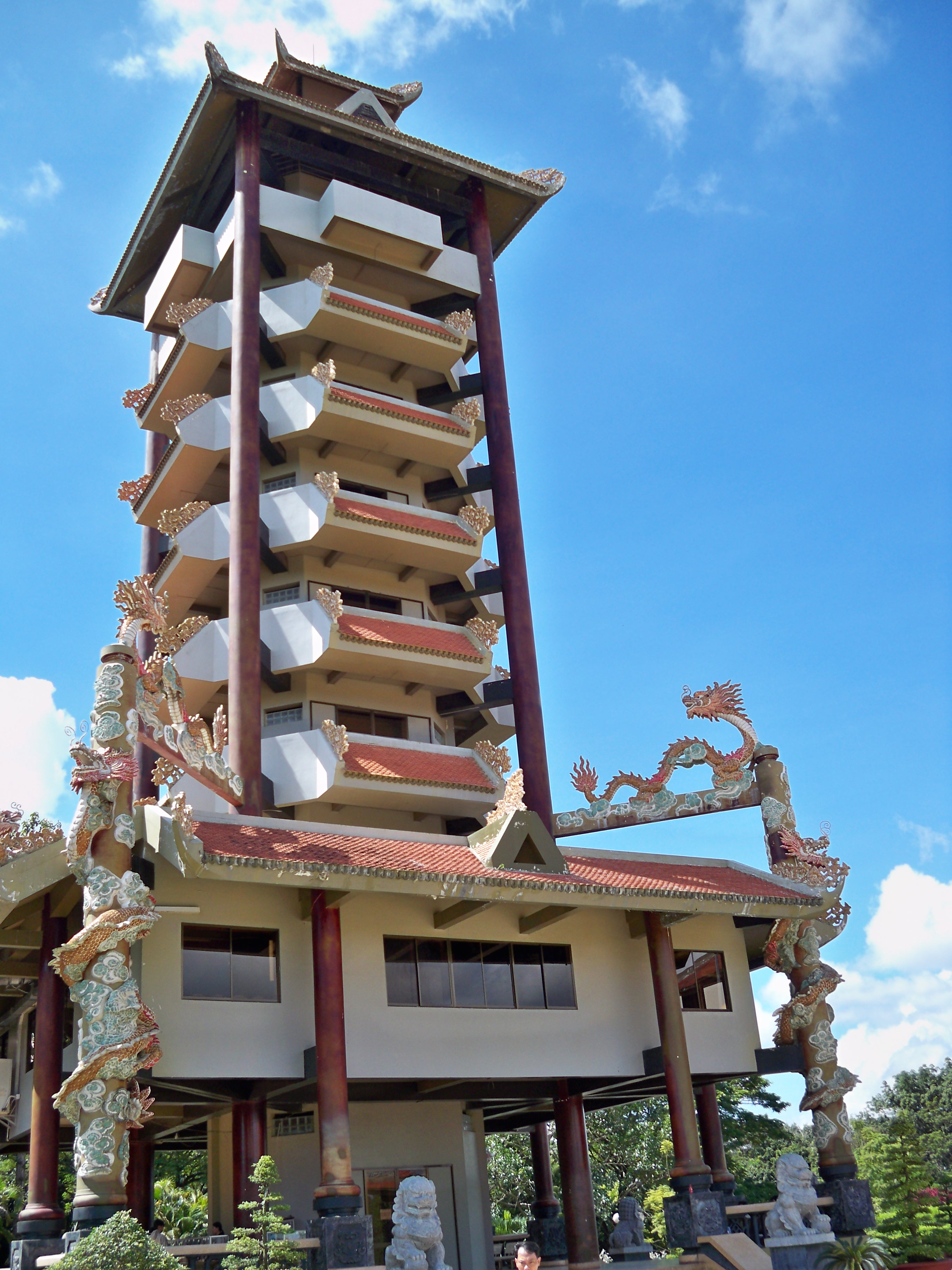
Tower in Bến Dược Memorial Temple

The tower symbolizes the rise up to the pinnacle of future fame.

The tower has 9 floors and is 39m high. On the wall of the tower are many designs to express the life and struggle of the Cu Chi people - "an iron bulwark land of revolution". On the highest floor of the tower, we can see part of the revolution base from which some places have entered into the history of the Iron Triangle (Tam Giác Sắt) region.

=== Flower garden ===
From a region of full of craters stunted and devastated by war, the area around the Temple now features a well-maintained flower garden that is lush and vibrant throughout the year with many kinds of precious trees sent as souvenirs by craftsmen and organizations. Notably, the Central, City and Provincial leaders have planted many kinds of precious trees in the flower garden in front of the Temple.

The flower garden behind the Temple has the symbol of the spirit of the country. It is made of granite 16m high and weighs 243 tons. The symbol is in the centre of the flower garden with its face to the Saigon River. The monument is designed in the shape of a teardrop, symbolizing the loss and sorrow endured by generations of Vietnamese who fought to protect their nation. The whole symbol features a lotus flower caressed by a hand, making the visitors remember the lines of two folk songs:

Thap Muoi the most beautiful thing is lotus flower

Vietnam the most beautiful thing is named Uncle Hồ

On the body of the symbol there are some carvings of Vietnamese historical events from the time of the country's establishment by Hùng Vương to independence day on April 30, 1975.

=== Basement ===
The basement of the temple has nine spaces on the theme of Saigon Cho Lon, resilient and indomitable, presenting the prominent war events of our people and soldiers in the Iron Triangle (Tam Giác Sắt) region in particular and Vietnam in general. They were to protest against the wars of the empire and its supporters. Those events come back to life by some imposing pictures, statues, sand tables, stage models, and sculptures. Each space presents a different historical period.

- In the first space: French invader, forget to protect our country.
- In the second space: General armed uprising of August 1945 in Saigon-Cho Lon-Gia Định.
- In the third space: The people and soldiers of Saigon - Cho Lon - Gia Định fired the first gun, starting the resistance against the French invasion and determined to protect our independence.
- In the fifth space: Guerrilla war of rural people in Củ Chi, an iron bulwark land of revolution.
- In the sixth space: Our people and soldiers take to the street, rising up in arms to attack during the Mau Than New Year.
- In the seventh space: People and soldiers of Saigon-Cho Lon-Gia Định contribute to the victory of Ho Chi Minh's campaign in the spring of 1975.
- In the eighth space: For the great signification, take his own body to make a live torch.
- In the ninth space: The southern people went first but returned last, for the thirst of peace, unification, independence and freedom.

== Purpose ==
The Bến Dược Memorial Temple was made by architects, scientists, historians, politicians, construction engineers and anonymous people, making it a harmony of architecture, people, and the community. It precisely captures the national characteristic of Vietnam while showing its gentle spirit.
