= War Remnants Museum =

War museum in Ho Chi Minh City, Vietnam

- Bảo tàng chứng tích chiến tranh
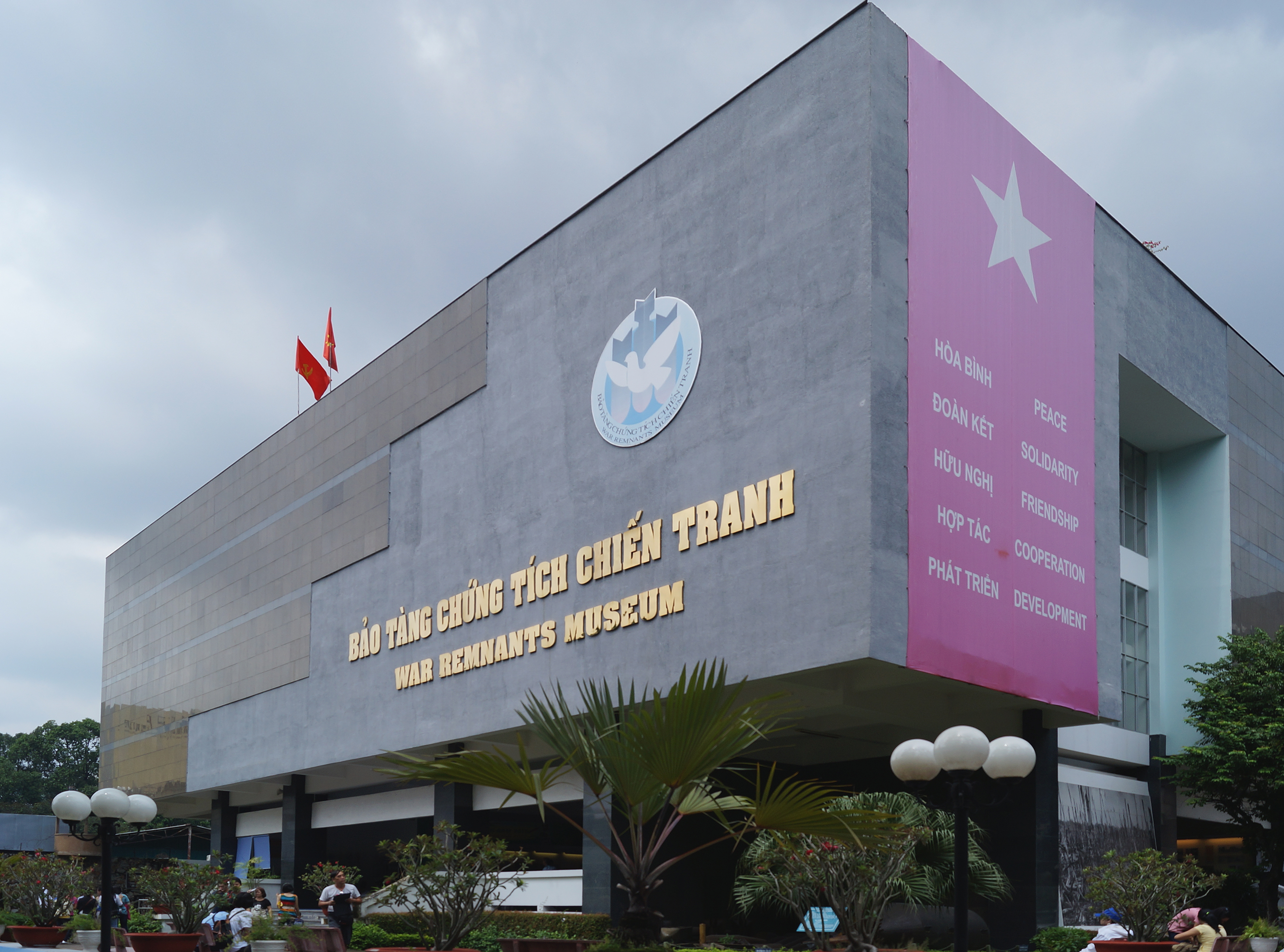
- War Remnants Museum, main building
- Established: 1975; 51 years ago
- Location: Xuân Hòa, Ho Chi Minh City, Vietnam
- Coordinates: 10.779475°N 106.692132°E
- Type: War museum
- Visitors: approx. 500,000/year (2009)
- Owner: Government of Vietnam

The War Remnants Museum (Vietnamese: Bảo tàng chứng tích chiến tranh, IPA: [ɓâw tàŋ cɯ̌ŋ tǐʲc cǐən ʈ͡ʂāɲ]) is a war museum at 28 Võ Văn Tần Street, Xuân Hòa, Ho Chi Minh City, Vietnam. It contains exhibits relating to the First Indochina War and the Vietnam War.

== History ==
Operated by the Ho Chi Minh City government, an earlier version of this museum opened on 4 September 1975, as the Exhibition House for US and Puppet Crimes (Vietnamese: Nhà trưng bày tội ác Mỹ-ngụy). It was located in the former United States Information Agency building. The exhibition was not the first of its kind for the North Vietnamese side, but rather followed a tradition of such exhibitions exposing war crimes, first those of the French and then those of the Americans, who had operated in the country as early as 1954.

Formerly known as the "Museum of Chinese and American War Crimes", the name was changed in 1990 to Exhibition House for Crimes of War and Aggression (Nhà trưng bày tội ác chiến tranh xâm lược), dropping both "U.S." and "Puppet." In 1995, following the normalization of diplomatic relations with the United States and end of the US embargo a year before, the references to "war crimes" and "aggression" were removed from the museum's title as well; it became the War Remnants Museum.

The building was the US military's intelligence headquarters during the Vietnam War.

== Exhibits ==
The museum comprises a series of themed rooms in several buildings, with period military equipment placed within a walled yard. The military equipment includes a Bell UH-1 "Huey" helicopter, an Northrop F-5A fighter, a BLU-82 "Daisy Cutter" bomb, M48 Patton tank, an Douglas A-1 Skyraider attack bomber, and an Cessna A-37 Dragonfly attack bomber. However, many of the aircraft decorated with non-standard "U.S. Air Force" decals were actually those of the South Vietnamese Air Force, altered for display purposes. There are a number of pieces of unexploded ordnance stored in the corner of the yard, with their charges and/or fuses removed.

One building reproduces the "tiger cages" in which the South Vietnamese government kept political prisoners. Other exhibits include graphic photography, accompanied by a short text in English, Vietnamese and Japanese, covering the effects of Agent Orange and other chemical defoliant sprays, the use of napalm and phosphorus bombs, and war atrocities such as the My Lai massacre. The photographic display includes work by Vietnam War photojournalist Bunyo Ishikawa that he donated to the museum in 1998. Curiosities include a guillotine used by the French and South Vietnamese to execute prisoners, the last time being in 1960, and three jars of preserved human fetuses deformed by exposure to dioxins and dioxin-like compounds, contained in the defoliant Agent Orange.

Within the museum are permanent and temporary exhibitions focusing on events dating from when the First Indochina War began in 1946, up until the end of the Vietnam War in 1975.

Past short-term exhibitions include Agent Orange in Vietnam and Vietnam Rose After the War, in a first-floor side room that often features rotating photographic displays. In 2014 and 2015 Agent Orange: Messages from the Heart, a collection of photos featuring thriving survivors of war, signaled a departure from the museum's precious tone towards a more reconciliatory one, in line with its trajectory since the mid-1990s.

== Reception ==
The War Remnants Museum is currently one of the most popular museums in Vietnam, attracting approximately half a million visitors every year. According to the museum's own estimates, about two-thirds of these are foreigners.

US anthropologist Christina Schwenkel wrote the museum attempts to convey historical truths with 'self-representation', presenting images and other features without contextualising them as other museums do. Museum curators are reported to be well aware that outside perspectives on the Vietnam War rarely account for the insights and experiences of the Vietnamese.

An analysis of the impression books (which the tourists may use to leave their comments in at the exit) revealed that the museum's visitors used to be mostly Europeans and North Americans before 2005, but that its audience became much more varied after Vietnam dropped their visa requirement for ASEAN countries that year. The impression books also record mixed responses to the museum. Others simply praised Vietnam, while some Americans harshly criticized the museum for its "propaganda" and "glorification of [their] victory". Broadening interests have expanded from other countries as well, including visits from tourists from Brazil, Turkey, South Africa and others expanding to see the museum.

== Gallery ==
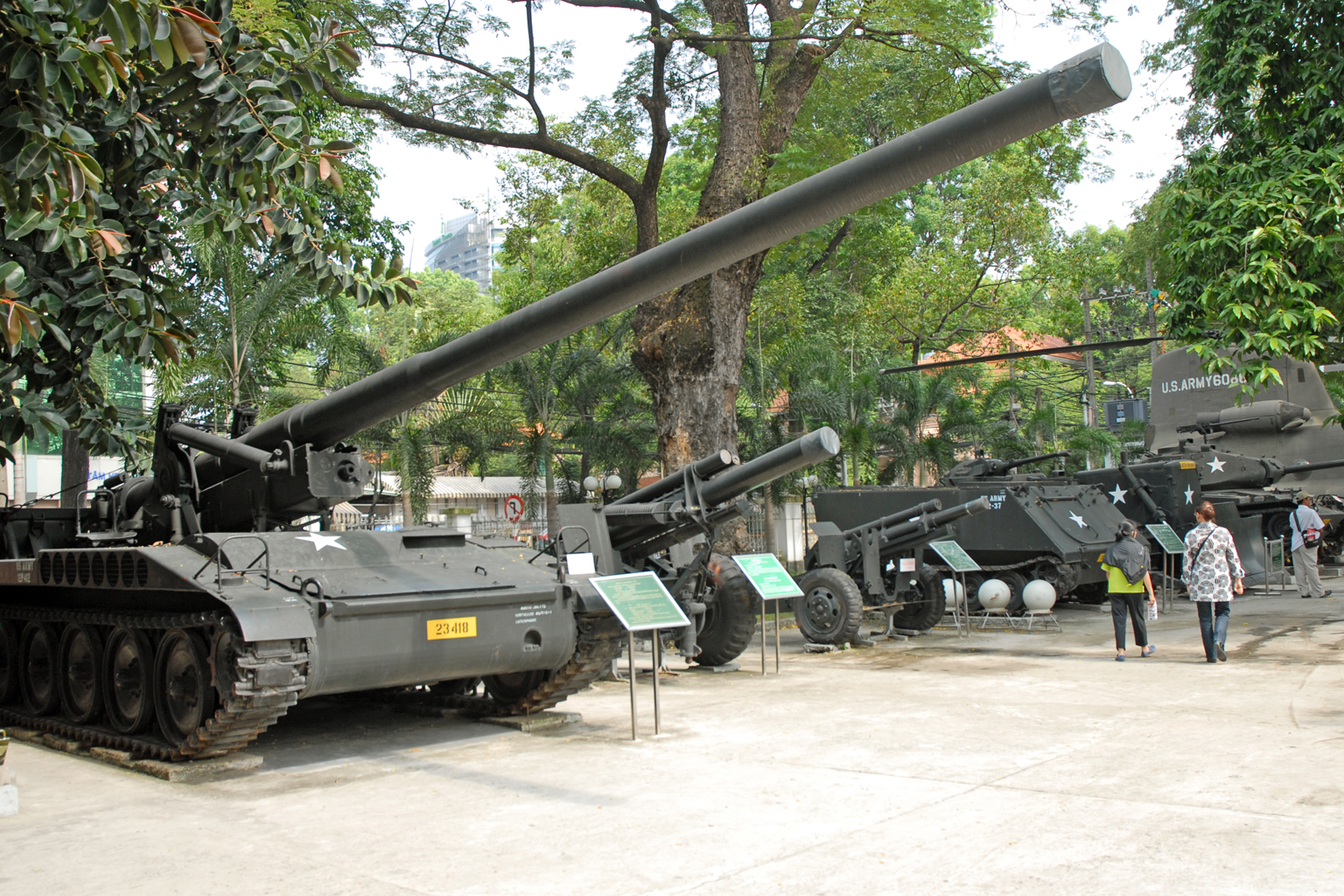
Artillery and armor collection

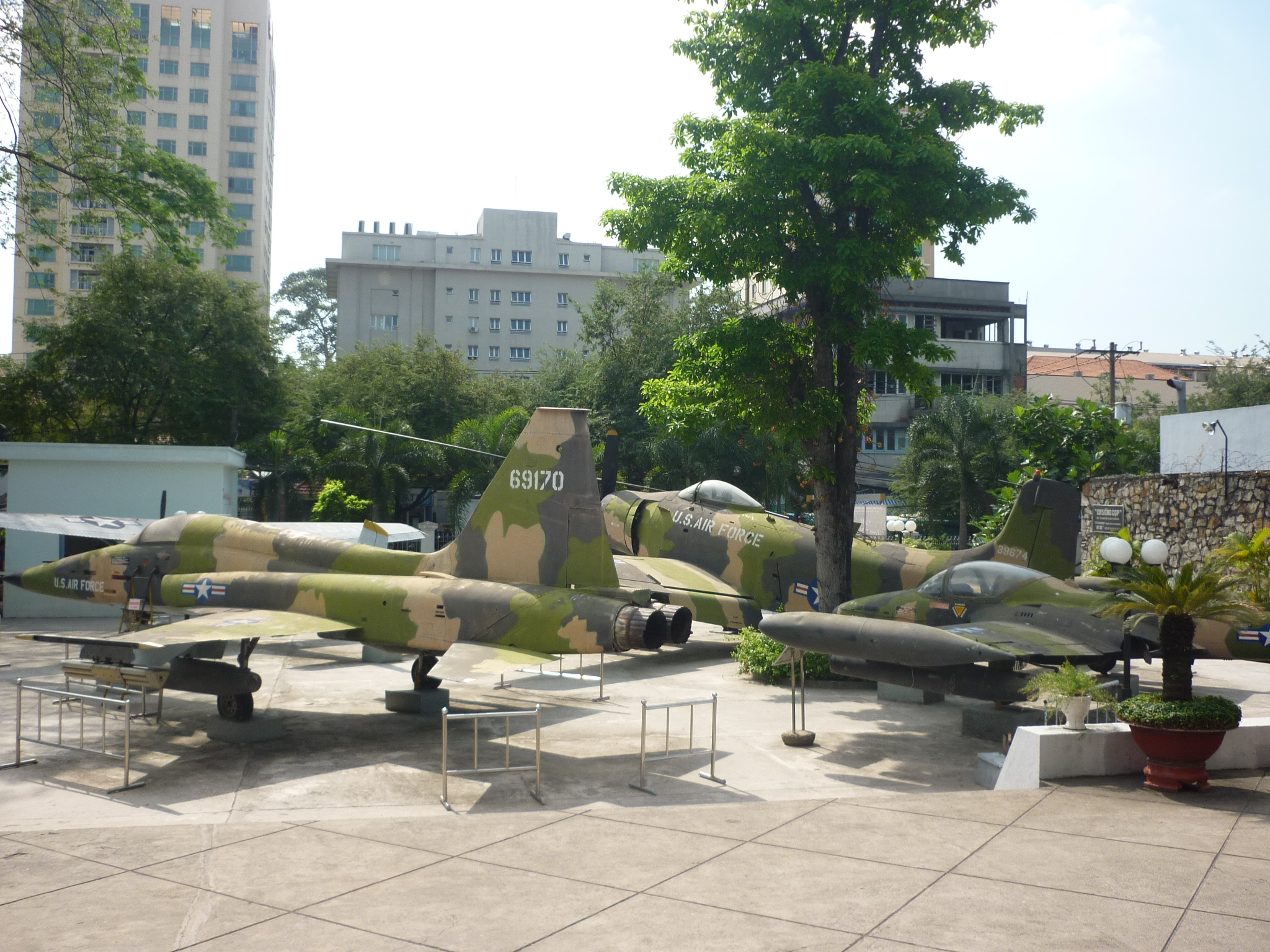
Aircraft collection

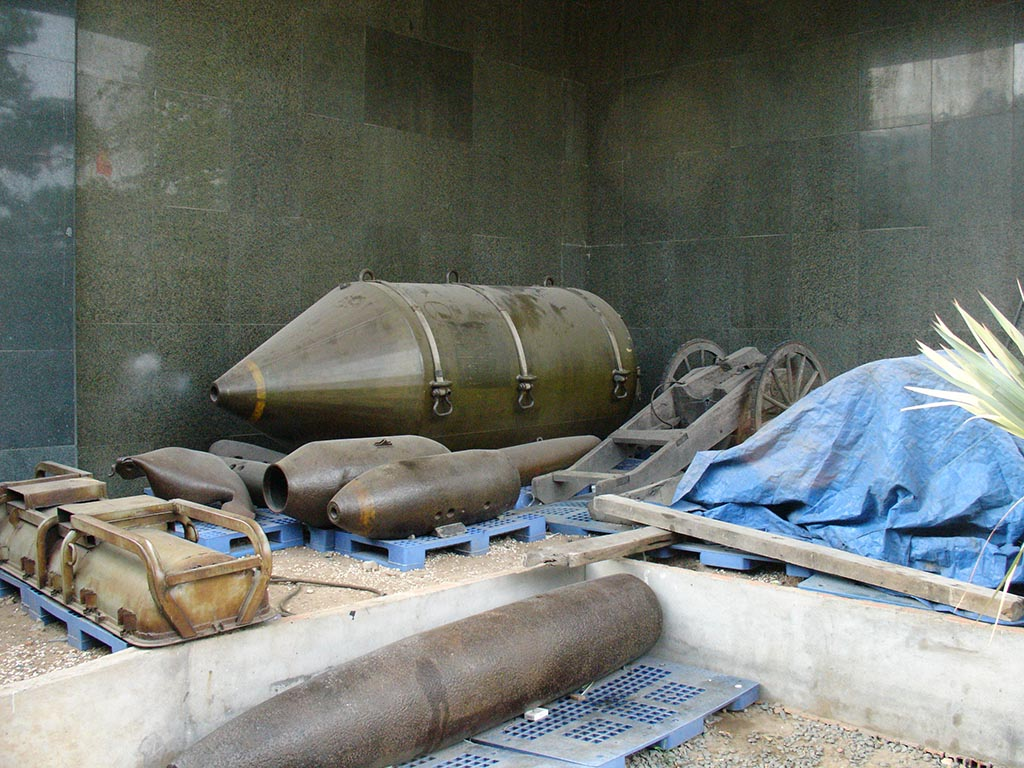
Defused ordnance on display.

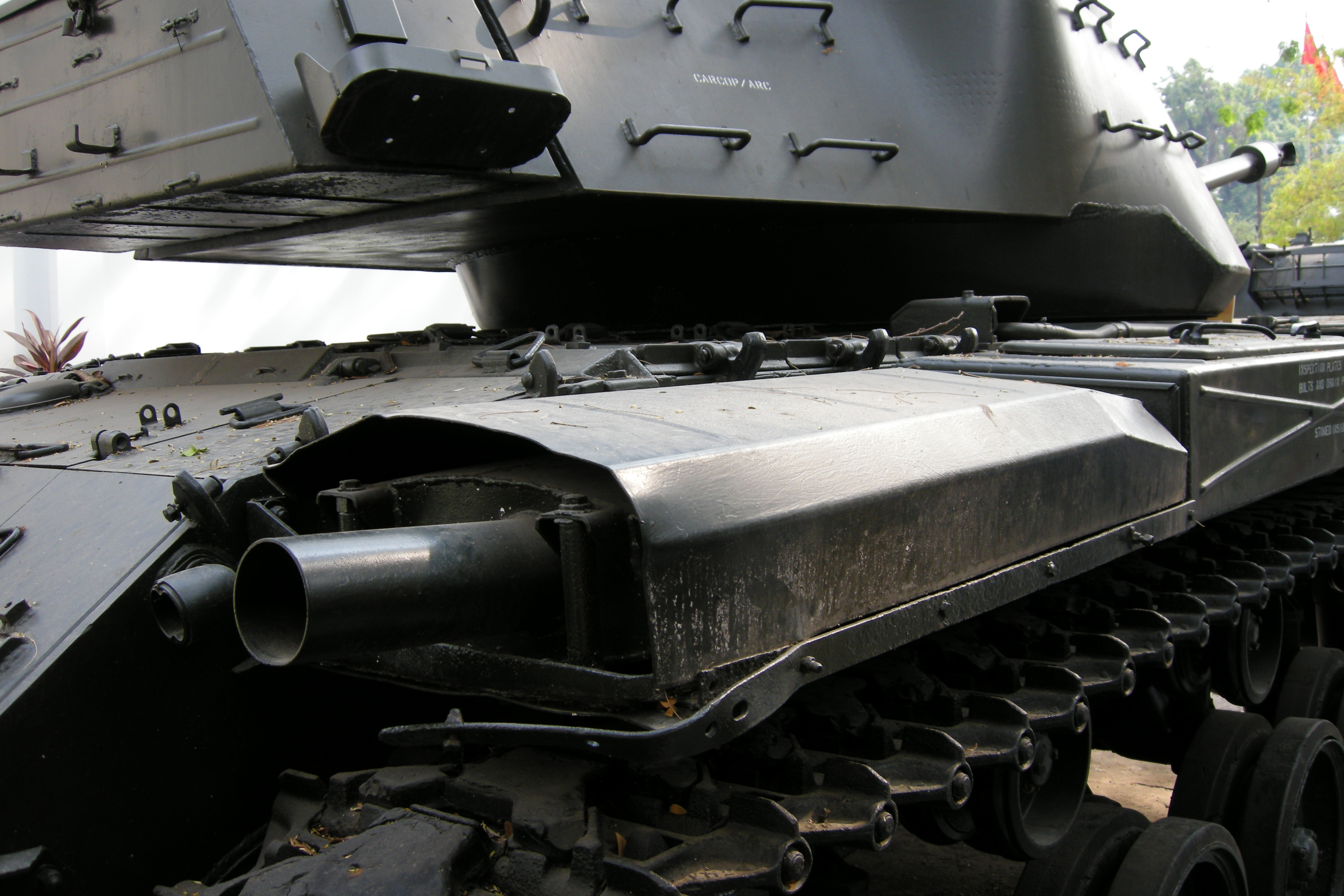
Captured M41 Walker Bulldog.

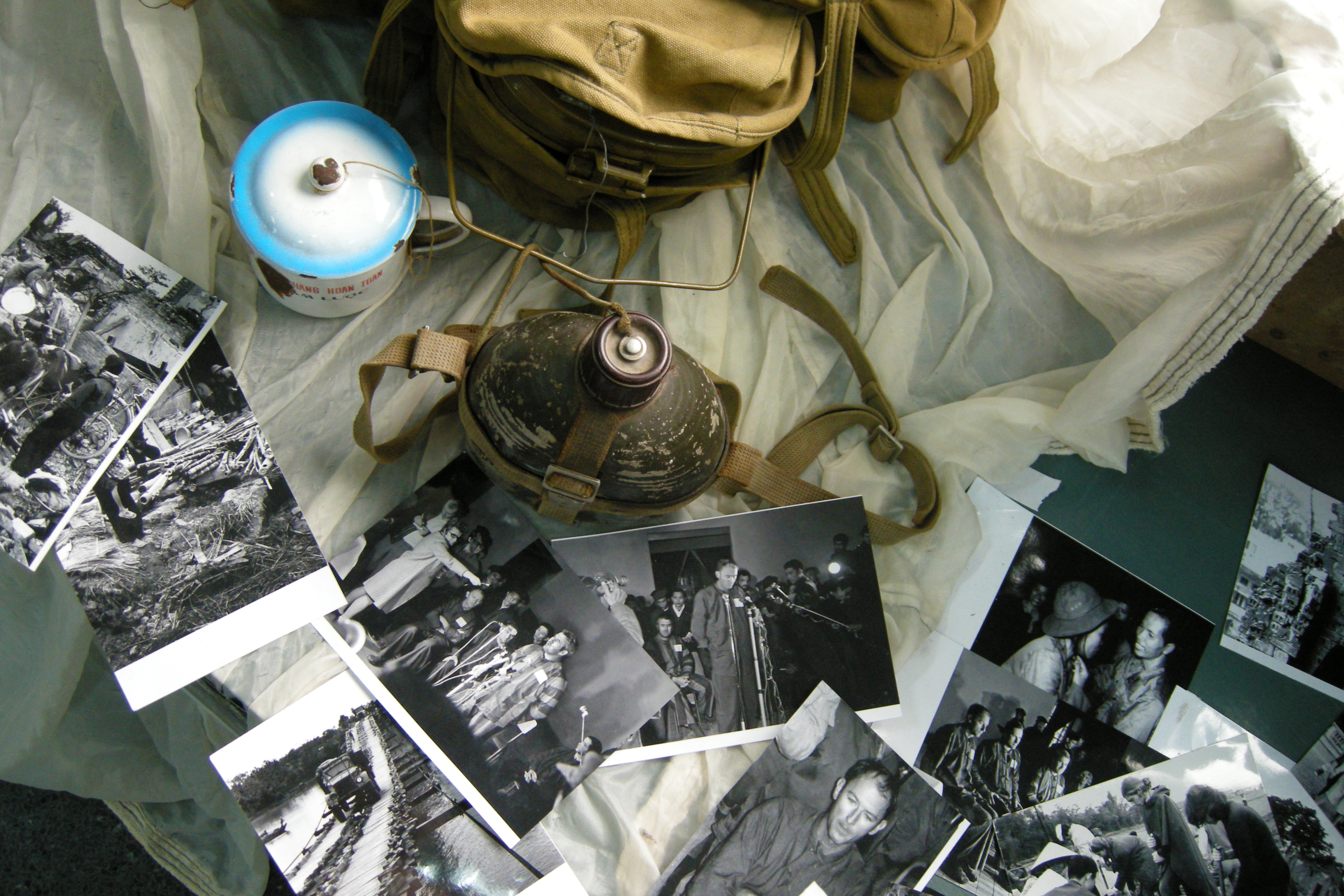
Relics of Vietnam War.

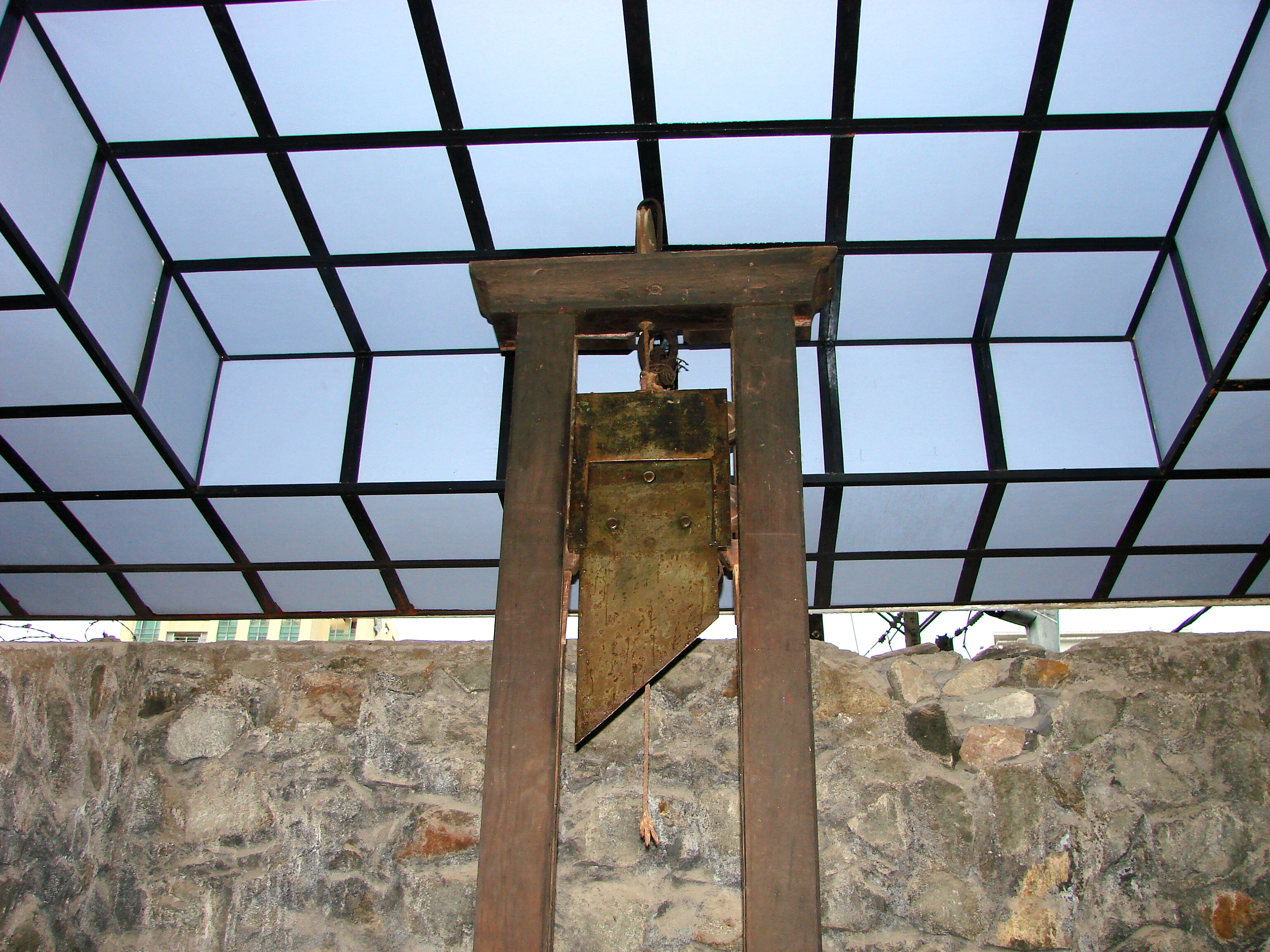
Guillotine used by the French.

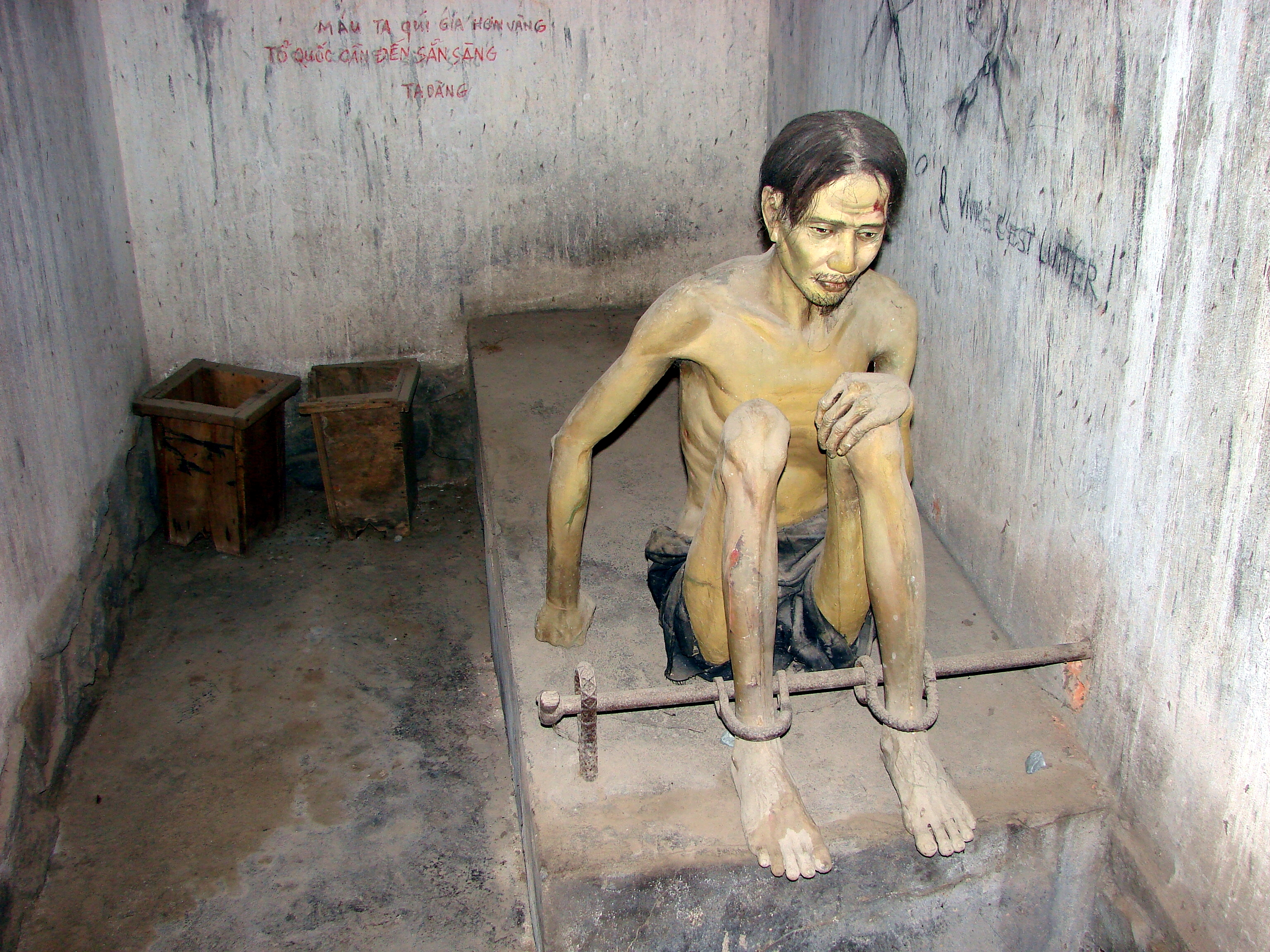
Diorama of detention conditions in some South Vietnamese prisons

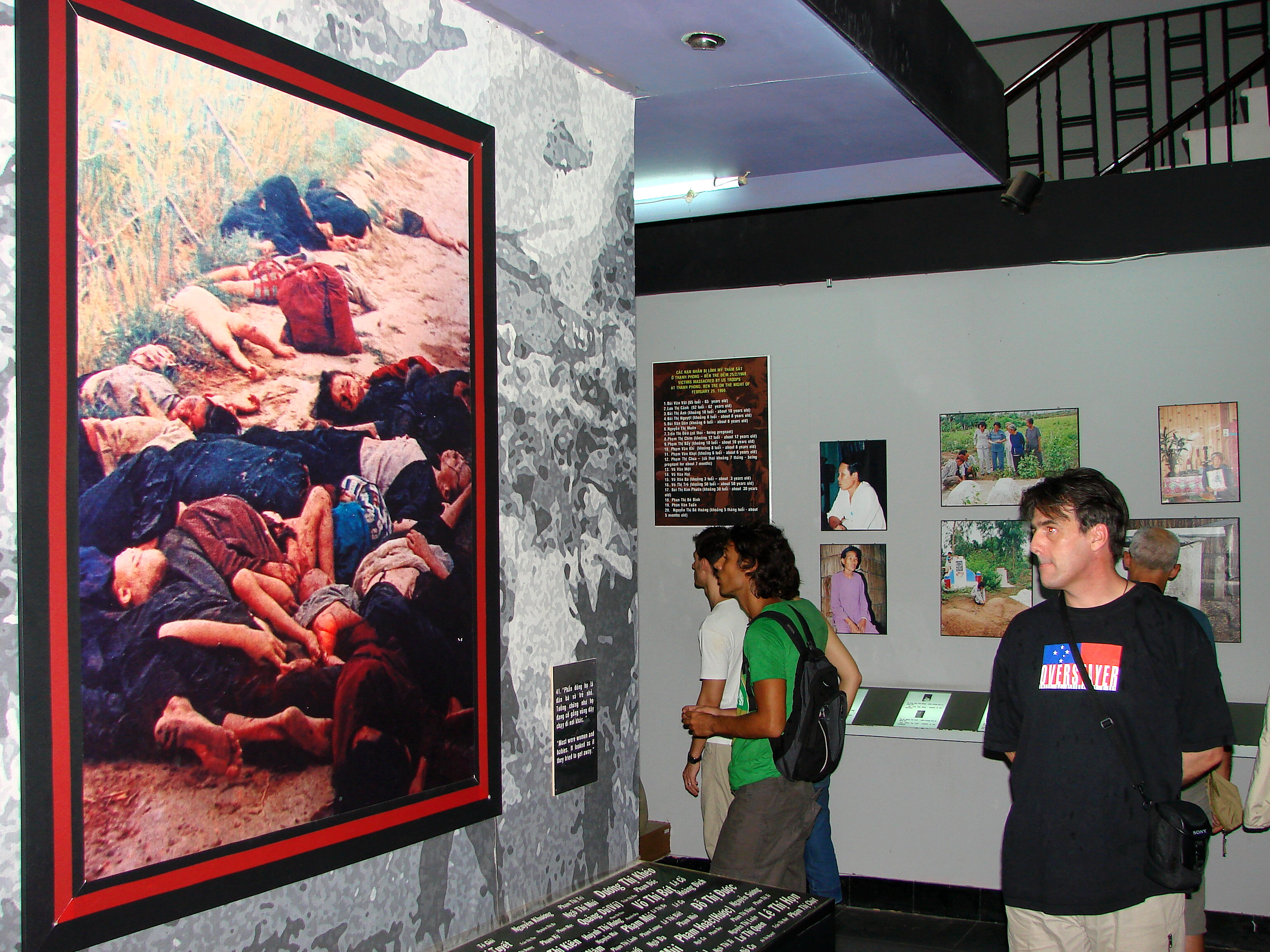
Exhibited picture of My Lai massacre aftermath

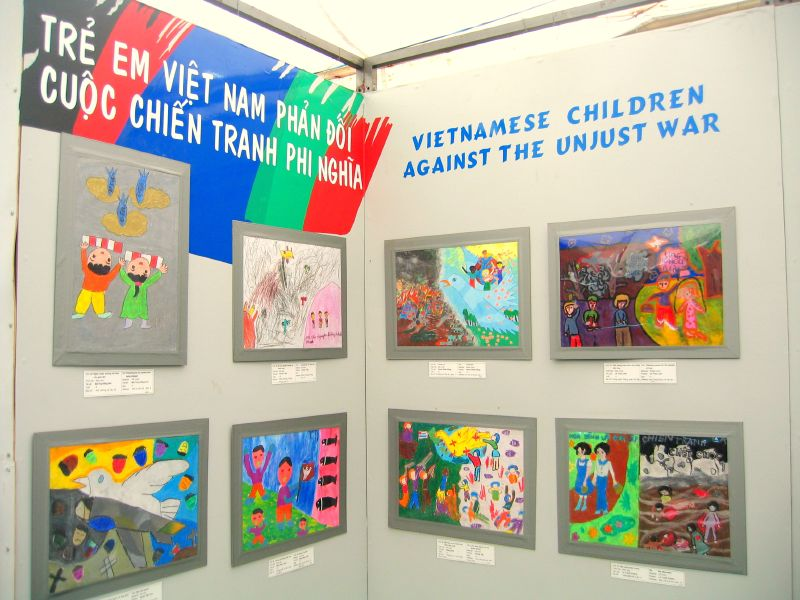
Display of anti-war artwork.

== See also ==
- Southeastern Armed Forces Museum Military Zone 7
- Vietnam People's Air Force Museum, Ho Chi Minh City
