= An Nhơn Tây, Ho Chi Minh City =

An Nhơn Tây Xã An Nhơn Tây Phú Mỹ Hưng
- Commune
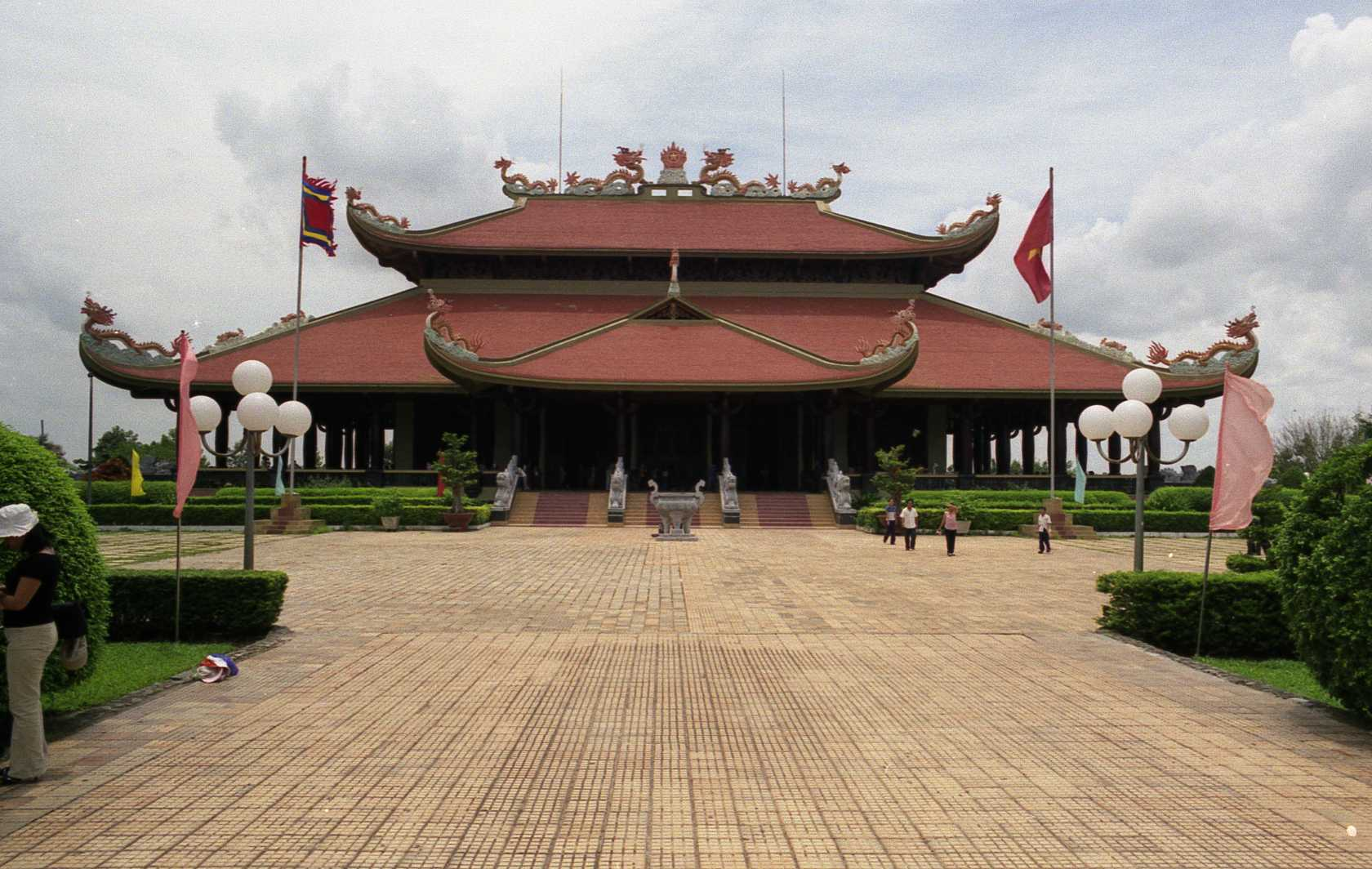
- Bến Dược Memorial Temple
- Interactive map of An Nhơn Tây
- Coordinates: 11°05′19″N 106°30′51″E
- Country: Vietnam
- Municipality: Ho Chi Minh City
- Established: June 16, 2025

Area
  - Total: 30.00 sq mi (77.70 km^{2})

Population (2024)
  - Total: 40,896
  - Density: 1,363/sq mi (526.3/km^{2})
- Time zone: UTC+07:00 (Indochina Time)
- Administrative code: 27508

An Nhơn Tây (Vietnamese: Xã An Nhơn Tây) is a commune of Ho Chi Minh City, Vietnam. It is one of the 168 new wards, communes and special zones of the city following the reorganization in 2025.

The commune is the site of the Củ Chi tunnels and the Bến Dược Memorial Temple.

== Geography ==
According to Official Dispatch No. 2896/BNV-CQĐP dated May 27, 2025 of the Ministry of Home Affairs, following the merger, An Nhơn Tây has a land area of 77.70 km², the population as of December 31, 2024 is 40,896 people, the population density is 526 people/km².

== History ==
On June 16, 2025, the National Assembly Standing Committee issued Resolution No. 1685/NQ-UBTVQH15 on the arrangement of commune-level administrative units of Ho Chi Minh City in 2025 (effective from June 16, 2025). Accordingly, the entire land area and population of Phú Mỹ Hưng, An Phú and An Nhơn Tây communes of the former Củ Chi district will be integrated into a new commune named Phú Hòa Đông (Clause 126, Article 1).
