= Saigon Adventist Hospital =

- Seventh-day Adventist Church

Geography
- Location: Saigon, Vietnam

Organisation
- Type: Private
- Affiliated university: Loma Linda University

Services
- Emergency department: Yes

History
- Closed: April 1975

Links
- Lists: Hospitals in Vietnam

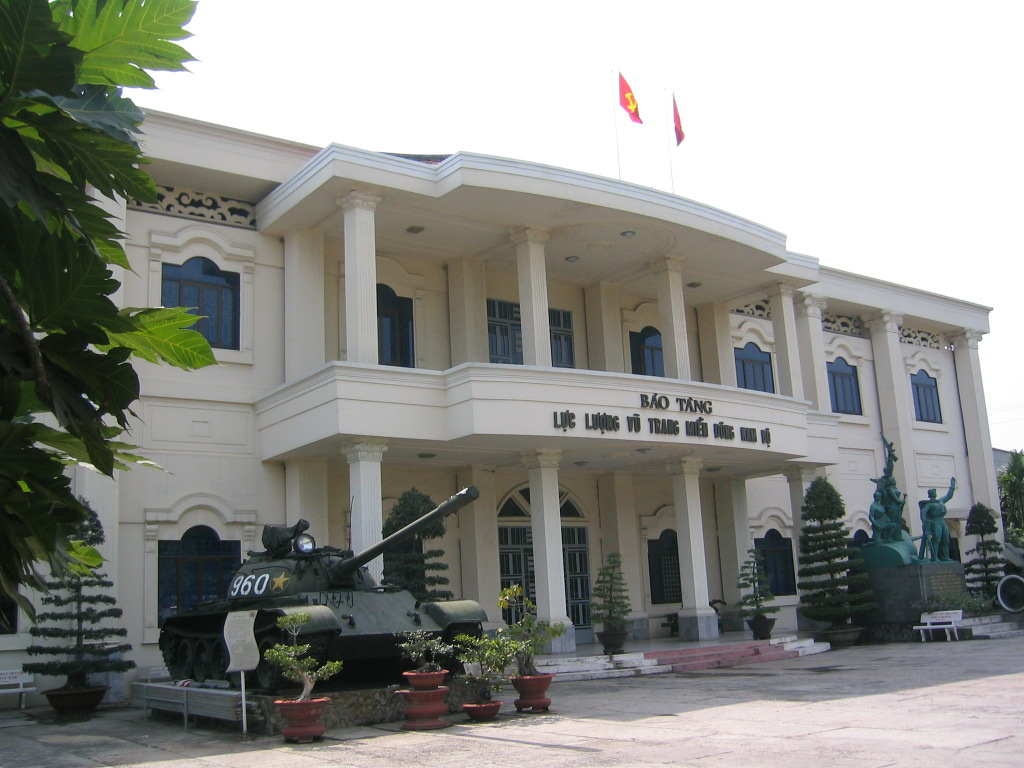
Saigon Adventist Hospital as it stands now

Saigon Adventist Hospital or US Army 3rd Field Hospital in Ho Chi Minh City. It was a private hospital, formerly operated by the United States Army before being given to the Seventh-day Adventist Church. The hospital was operated by the Loma Linda University School of Medicine and performed the only open heart surgery operation in Vietnam at the time. The hospital was a former mansion converted to facilitate 38 hospital beds.

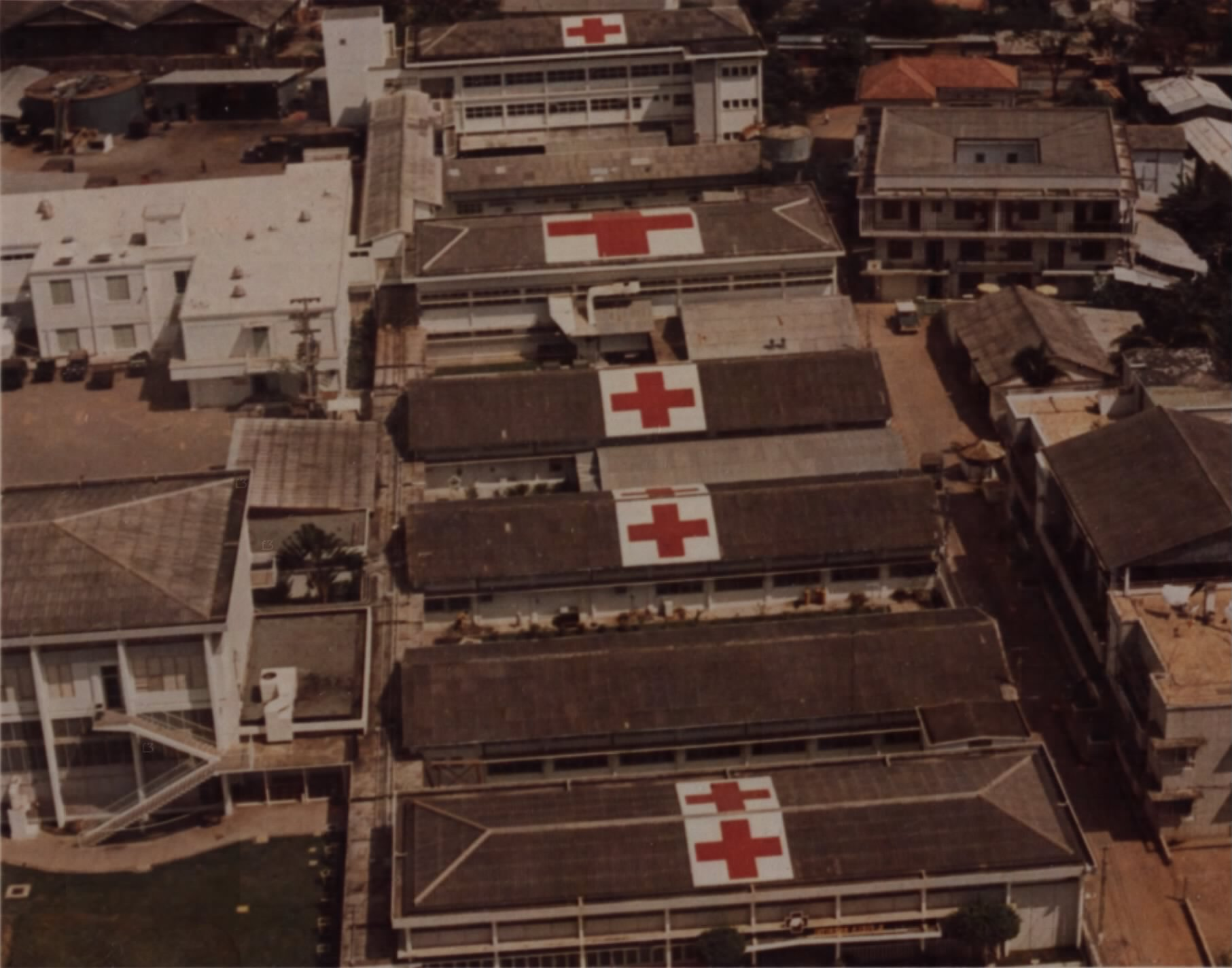
Aerial view of the 3rd Field Hospital, Saigon, May 1970

In March 1973, the hospital was moved from the location at the Phu Nhuan crossroads to the former US Army 3rd Field Hospital. The move was to be temporary until construction of a new hospital at another location was completed.

More than 410 employees and church workers escaped before the Fall of Saigon. However, thousands of members and many pastors and teachers and other employees remained behind in Vietnam. The remaining members reorganised the work in Vietnam. Some of these members lost their lives while some were forced into re-education camps. Many of the workers could not move or travel from one area to another without permission. Most of the churches were shut down, and all the schools were closed.

== See also ==
- List of Seventh-day Adventist hospitals
