= Vietnam People's Air Force Museum, Ho Chi Minh City =

Coordinates: 10°48′18″N 106°39′40″E

- Bảo tàng Không quân phía Nam
- Established: 1989; 36 years ago
- Location: 87 Thăng Long Street, Ward 4, Tân Bình District, Ho Chi Minh City
- Type: Aviation museum

The Vietnam People's Air Force Museum, Saigon (Vietnamese: Bảo tàng Không quân phía Nam) is located on the intersection of Phan Thúc Duyện–Thăng Long Street in Ward 4 of District Tân Bình, Ho Chi Minh City. The museum is next to the off-airport cargo terminal of Tan Son Nhat International Airport and adjacent to the "Phi Long" gate of the former Tan Son Nhut Air Base, which is now Cộng Hòa Street.

The museum tells the history of the Vietnam People's Air Force (VPAF) in the Second Indochina War and the Cambodian-Vietnamese War. The museum comprises one main building with a small display of uniforms and flightsuits, aircraft weaponry and engines. Outside is a static park with aircraft of the VPAF and the Republic of Vietnam Air Force.

The museum is open from Tuesday to Thursday and on weekends, from 07:30 to 11:00 and 13:30 to 17:00. Admission is free.

== Aircraft on display ==
Aircraft on outside display include:

- Bell UH-1 Iroquois H model
- Cessna A-37 Dragonfly
- Cessna U-17A
- Mikoyan-Gurevich MiG-21MF
- Mil Mi-8 Hip
- Mil Mi-24 Hind A
- Northrop F-5 Freedom Fighter
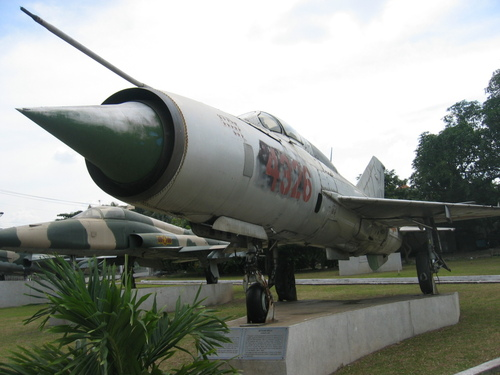
MiG-21MF

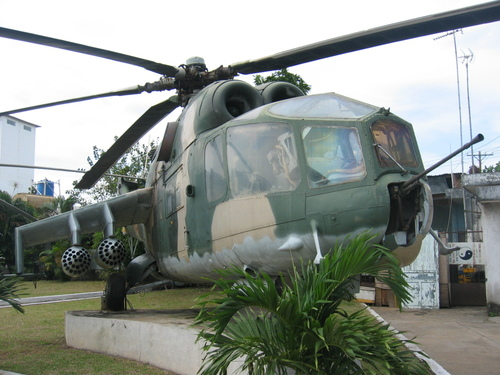
Mi-24A

== See also ==
- Southeastern Armed Forces Museum Military Zone 7
- War Remnants Museum
