= Culinary tourism =

Tourism with the aim of exploring the food

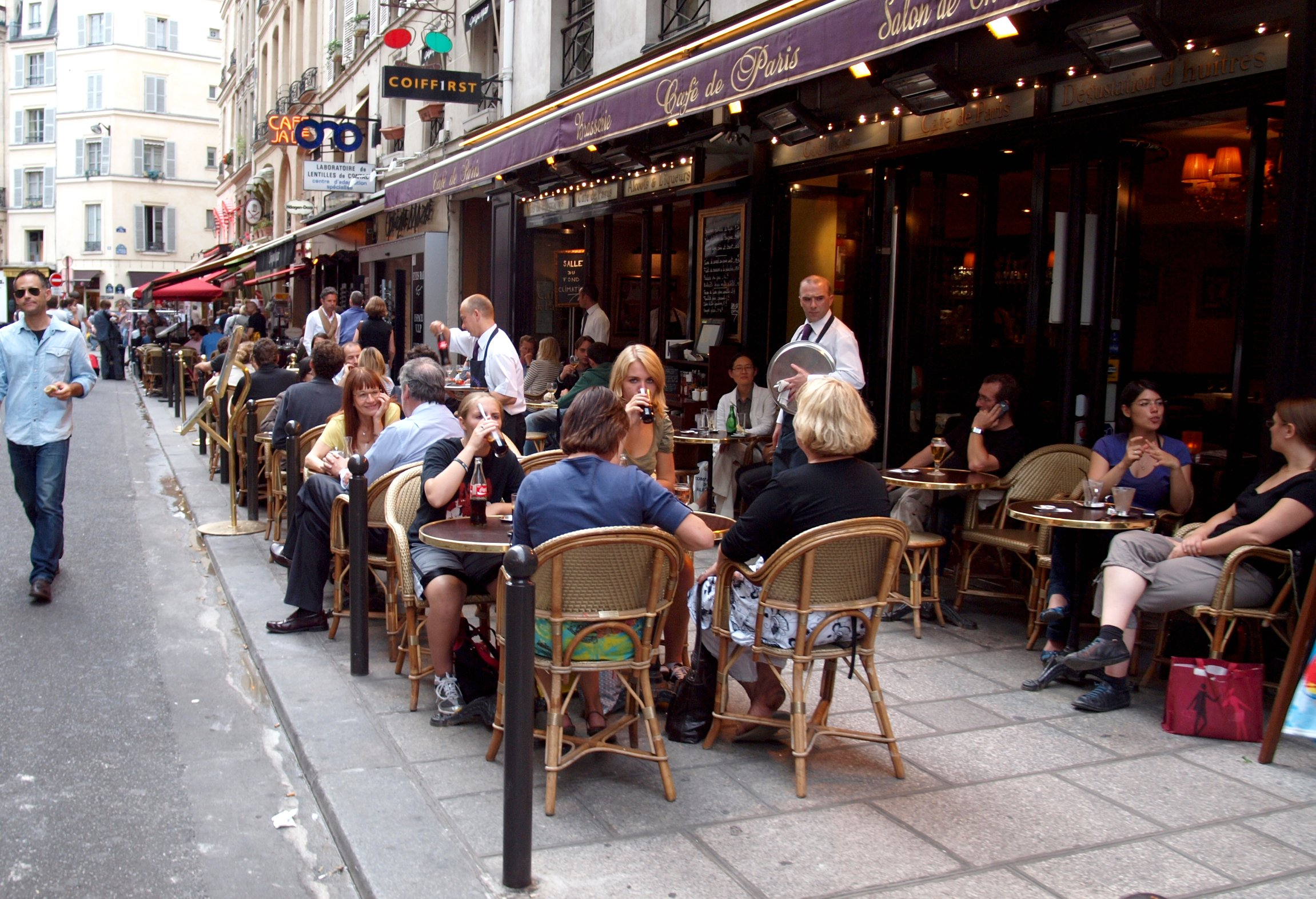
France is a country that has been strongly associated with culinary tourism with both international visitors as well as French citizens traveling to different parts of the country to sample local foods and wine.

Culinary tourism or food tourism or gastronomy tourism is the exploration of food as the purpose of tourism. It is considered a vital component of the tourism experience. Dining out is common among tourists and "food is believed to rank alongside climate, accommodation, and scenery" in importance to tourists.

Culinary tourism became prominent in 2001 after Erik Wolf, president of the World Food Travel Association, wrote a white paper on the subject. A 2019 study revealed that 93% of participants engaged in food and beverage activities during their trips over the past two years, and 82% spent more on food and beverages while traveling than at home.

== Overview ==
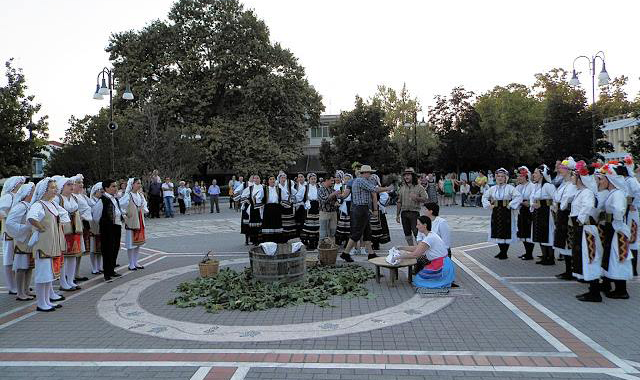
Wine festival in Ampelonas, Greece

Culinary or food tourism is the pursuit of unique and memorable eating and drinking experiences, both near and far. Culinary tourism differs from agritourism in that culinary tourism is considered a subset of cultural tourism (cuisine is a manifestation of culture) whereas agritourism is considered a subset of rural tourism, but culinary tourism and agritourism are inextricably linked, as the seeds of cuisine can be found in agriculture. Culinary/food tourism is not limited to gourmet food. Food tourism can be considered a subcategory of experiential travel.

While many cities, regions, or countries are known for their food, culinary tourism is not limited by food culture. Every tourist eats about three times a day, making food one of the fundamental economic drivers of tourism. Countries like Ireland, Peru, and Canada are making a significant investment in culinary tourism development and are seeing results with visitor spending and overnight stays rising as a result of food tourism promotion and product development.

Food tourism includes activities such as taking cooking classes; going on food or drink tours; attending food and beverage festivals; participating in specialty dining experiences; shopping at specialty retail spaces; and visiting farms, markets, and producers.

== Economic impact ==
The World Food Travel Association estimates that food and beverage expenses account for 15% to 35% of all tourism spending, depending on the affordability of the destination. The WFTA lists possible food tourism benefits as including more visitors, more sales, more media attention, increased tax revenue, and greater community pride.

== Cooking classes ==
A growing area of culinary tourism is cooking classes. The formats vary from a short lesson lasting a few hours to full-day and multi-day courses. The focus for foreign tourists will usually be on the cuisine of the country they are visiting, whereas local tourists may be keen to experience cuisines new to them. Many cooking classes also include market tours to enhance the cultural experience. Some cooking classes are held in local people's homes, allowing foreign tourists to catch a glimpse of what daily life and cuisine look like for those in the country they're visiting. Both the local hosts and foreign guests benefit from the cross-cultural experience.

== Food tours ==
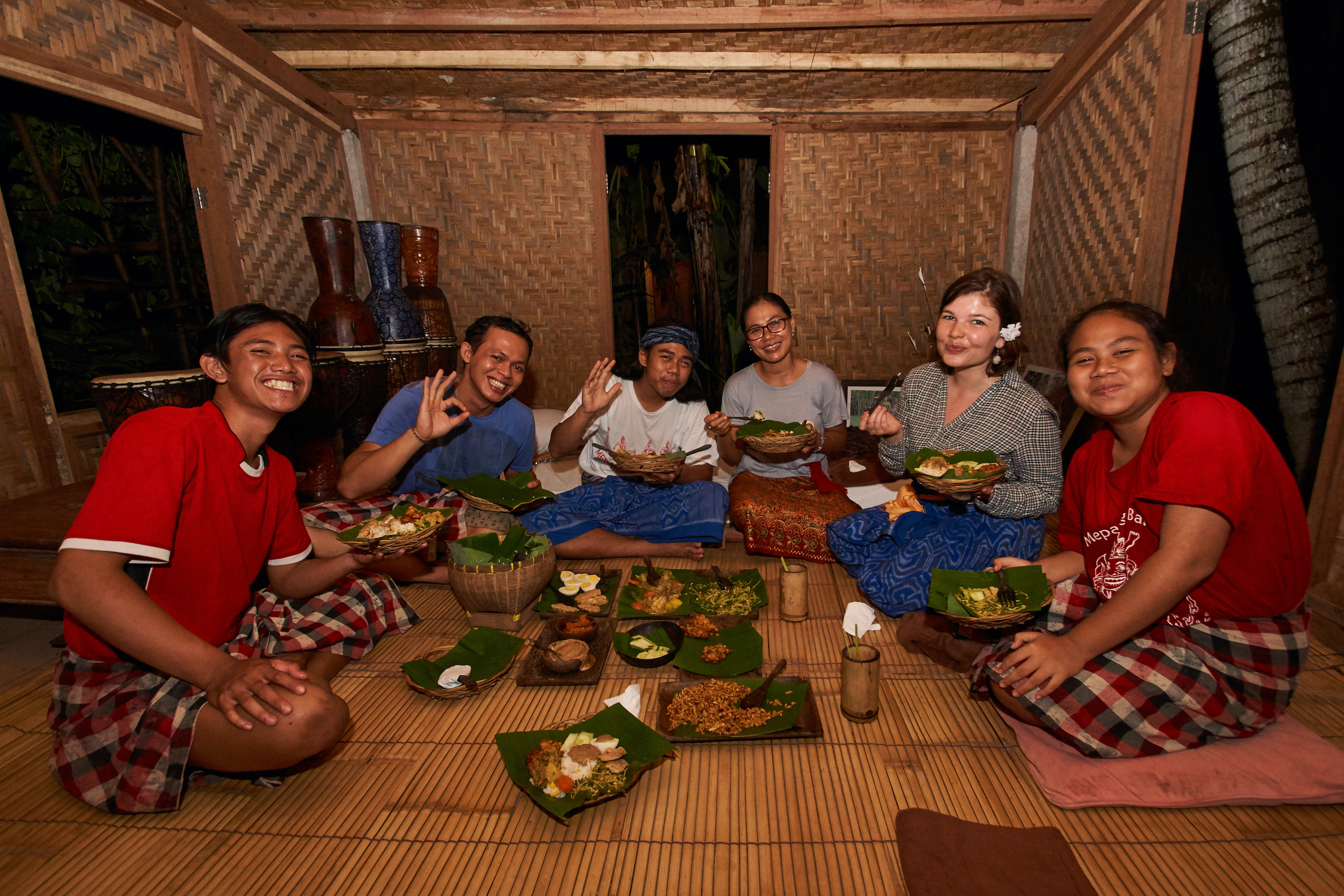
A home dinner in Bali, Indonesia (2016), made as part of a food tour

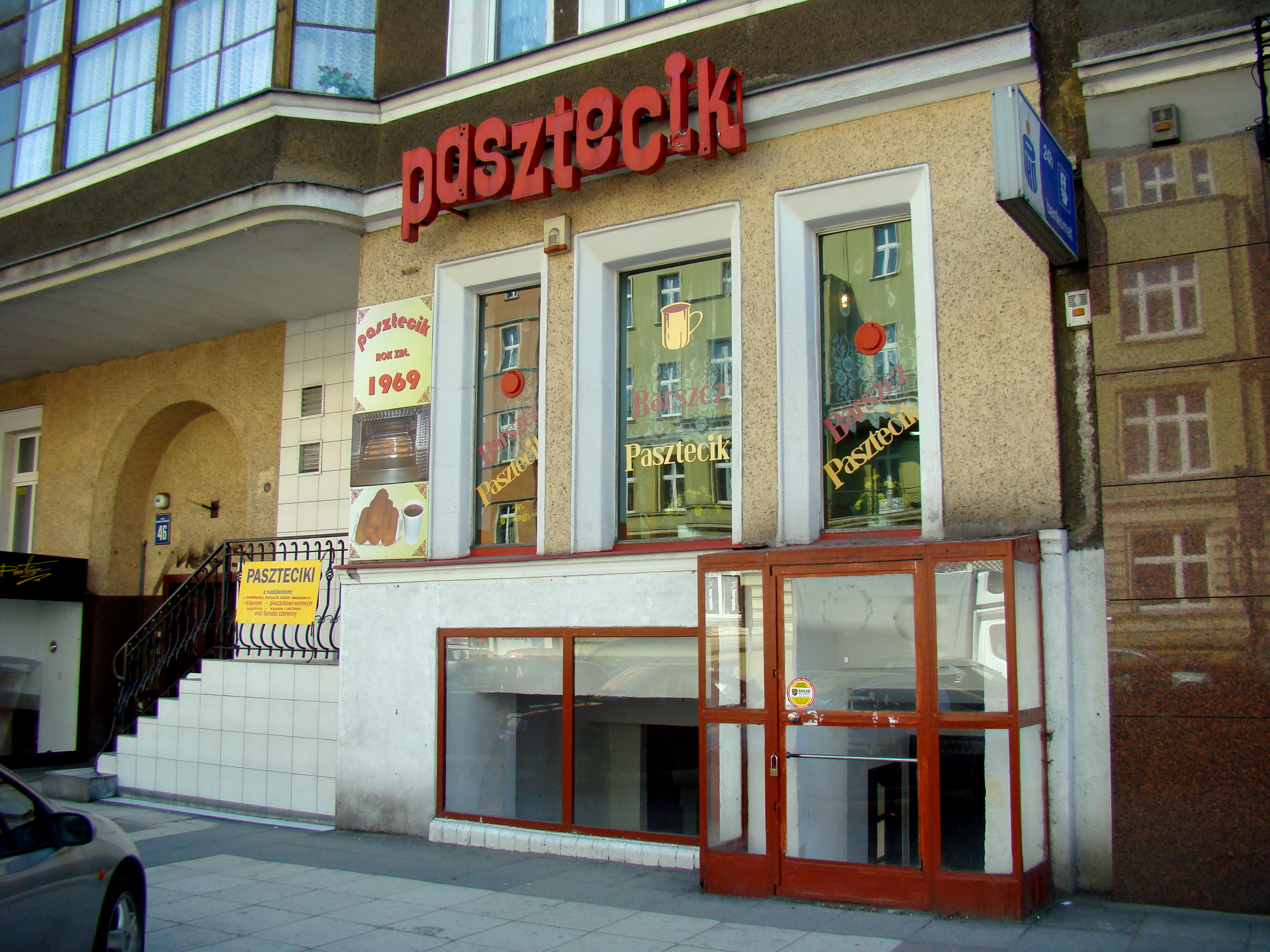
The oldest bar serving dough named pasztecik szczeciński in the center of Szczecin (Poland), a popular destination for tourists visiting the city. Pasztecik szczeciński is one of traditional dishes of the Western Pomerania.

Food tours vary by locale and by operator. They are common in major cities such as London, Paris, Rome, Florence, Toronto, Kuala Lumpur, and Barcelona.

June 10, 2017, was the first annual National Food Tour Day, celebrating food tourism around the world. The World Food Travel Association introduced World Food Travel Day on April 18, 2018, as a way to put the spotlight on how and why we travel to experience the world's culinary cultures. It is designed to bring awareness to both consumers and trade, and support the Association's mission – to preserve and promote culinary cultures through hospitality and tourism. The day is celebrated all around the world every year on April 18.

== See also ==
- Cooking school
- Foodie
- Gourmet
- Gastronomy
