= Thanh Hà Pottery Village =

Coordinates: 15°52′39″N 108°17′58″E

- Interactive map of Thanh Hà Pottery Village
- Location: Nam Diêu Quarter, Hội An Tây Ward, Đà Nẵng, Vietnam
- Designation: Traditional Craft Village

Thanh Hà Pottery Village is a traditional pottery village located in Nam Diêu quarter, Hội An Tây ward, Đà Nẵng City, Vietnam. The village developed in connection with the urban and trading port system of Hội An and the waterways along the Thu Bồn River.

In 2019, Thanh Ha pottery craft was included in Vietnam’s National Intangible Cultural Heritage list under the category of traditional handicrafts. The tourism area associated with the village includes pottery-making experiences and Thanh Ha Terracotta Park. The park was established to introduce traditional pottery crafts and display terracotta architectural models. In 2016, Terracotta Park received the “Building of the Year” award from Ashui Awards.

== Location and administration ==
Thanh Hà Pottery Village is located in Nam Diêu quarter, Hội An Tây ward, Đà Nẵng City, Vietnam.

At the provincial administrative level, Resolution No. 202/2025/QH15 reorganized the entire natural area and population of Đà Nẵng City and Quảng Nam Province to form a new provincial-level administrative unit named Đà Nẵng City.

At the ward level, Resolution No. 1659/NQ-UBTVQH15 established Hội An Tây ward through the reorganization of the entire natural area and population of Thanh Hà ward, Tân An ward, Cẩm An ward, and Cẩm Hà commune. The newly reorganized commune and ward level administrative units officially came into operation on 1 July 2025.

== History and pottery craft ==
In the history, Thanh Ha pottery village was established around the 16th and 17th centuries by a number of craftsmen from Thanh Hóa, Nghệ An.

Thanh Hà pottery products were used for daily life, worship, and civil engineering (including bricks and tiles in Hoi An ancient structures). They were recorded by the Nguyễn Dynasty as the local product of Quảng Nam.

Thanh Hà Pottery Village is a representative craft village within the cultural and tourism space of Hội An. The village is associated with the handicraft production and trading network of the lower Thu Bồn River.

The local pottery craft was included in Vietnam’s National Intangible Cultural Heritage list in 2019 under the category of traditional handicrafts.

== Tourism ==
Tourism activities at Thanh Hà Pottery Village are associated with traditional pottery-making processes, pottery products intended for tourism purposes and community activities in Nam Diêu quarter.

Several traditional rituals and cultural practices associated with pottery production continue to be observed by the local community. These include annual ceremonies dedicated to the craft ancestors, which form part of the village's intangible cultural heritage. In 2025, Thanh Hà Pottery Village in Hội An, Đà Nẵng has been recognised as one of the five best community tourism destinations at the "2025 Vietnam Tourism Awards" held on September 27 in Ha Noi.

In local tourism programs, Thanh Hà Pottery Village is often introduced with the heritage spaces of Hội An Ancient Town and riverside tourism routes, contributing to the formation of handicraft and cultural destinations within the urban area of Hội An.

== Thanh Hà Terracotta Park ==
Thanh Hà Terracotta Park is a tourism and exhibition complex associated with Nam Diêu craft village and Thanh Hà Pottery Village.

The park covers an area of more than 6,500 square meters. Construction began in 2011, and the site officially opened to visitors in 2015. Its architectural concept is based on the image of a pottery wheel as the central structure.

The park includes five main sections: a pottery museum, an outdoor exhibition area, Nam Diêu craft village space, a creative workshop area, and service and trade promotion area.

The outdoor exhibition area contains large terracotta sculptures and miniature models of architectural works from Vietnam and other countries.
