= Bảy Mẫu Coconut Forest =

Palm forest in Vietnam

- Cẩm Thanh Coconut Forest
- Interactive map of Bảy Mẫu Coconut Forest
- Location: Cẩm Thanh Commune, Hội An, Quảng Nam Province, Vietnam
- Coordinates: 15°52′30″N 108°22′27″E
- Designation: Historical and cultural relic

Bảy Mẫu Coconut Forest (also known as Cẩm Thanh Coconut Forest) is a nipa palm forest (Nypa fruticans) associated with the wetland ecosystem in Cẩm Thanh Commune, Hội An, Quảng Nam Province, Vietnam. The area is developed for tourism through basket boat (thung boat) rides and inland waterway routes within a network of canals and creeks in the downstream estuarine zone.

The surrounding coastal wetland and estuarine landscape of Hội An, including Cẩm Thanh, lies within the Cu Lao Cham – Hội An Biosphere Reserve, which is part of the UNESCO Man and the Biosphere Programme.

== Location and natural features ==
Bảy Mẫu Coconut Forest is situated within a wetland area to the east–southeast of Hội An, near the confluence zone and tidal influence of the lower river system, including the Thu Bồn River. According to descriptions by UNDP, nipa palm is classified within the mangrove forest group and is distributed primarily in the lower reaches of the Thu Bon River, with a significant concentration in Cẩm Thanh. The nipa palm ecosystem is associated with local aquatic resources and livelihoods, including the harvesting of fish, shrimp, and crab.

Local tourism management sources describe the coconut forest area in Cam Thanh as covering nearly 100 hectares, although figures may vary depending on classification and seasonal tidal conditions.

From a botanical perspective, nipa palm (Nypa fruticans) is a species widely recognized as native to South and Southeast Asia, including Vietnam, according to plant distribution records maintained by the Royal Botanic Gardens, Kew.

== Historical significance ==
Bảy Mẫu Coconut Forest has been described as a "revolutionary base" associated with local resistance activities during the 20th century. According to an overview of a conservation and heritage promotion project published by the Hội An heritage information system, the site was officially recognized as a provincial-level historical relic in 2007.

== Tourism and destination management ==
In September 2017, the Hoi An People's Committee issued Decision No. 1995/QĐ-UB approving a ticketing scheme for visits to the site, with ticket sales commencing on 1 December 2017. According to the same source, the designated visitor area includes the hamlets of Thanh Tam Đông, Vạn Lăng, Thanh Nhứt, Cồn Nhàn, and Thanh Tam Tây. The entrance fee was set at VND 30,000 per person. Ticket revenue was allocated on a 50–50 basis, with 50% contributed to the state budget and 50% used for destination management, environmental maintenance, and local tourism order.

In February 2018, a report published on the portal of the Ministry of Culture, Sports and Tourism stated that in January 2018 more than 43,000 visitors purchased entrance tickets, generating nearly VND 1.3 billion in revenue. The report also noted that during the pilot phase in December 2017, approximately 29,000 tickets were sold.

In 2023, the Rừng dừa Bảy Mẫu was recognized as a leading tourism destination in the Asia–Pacific region at the Vietnam–India Cultural and Economic Exchange Forum.

In 2024, basket boat experiences in Cẩm Thanh were included among the world's top 25 water-based tourism activities.

In 2025, a revised plan for the organization and development of visitor routes at the site identified a total of 17 routes. Of these, 13 routes include docks managed by the state, while four are associated with docks oriented toward management by private individuals or enterprises. The routes are categorized according to experiential characteristics, including those designed to introduce the buffer zone values of the biosphere reserve and the Cẩm Thanh nipa palm handicraft village.

== Conservation and ecological restoration ==
UNDP has reported a trend of natural resource degradation associated with unsustainable exploitation of nipa palm. The same source describes a project implemented between 2010 and 2013 by the Cam Thanh Commune Farmers’ Association, with financial support from the GEF Small Grants Programme (GEF SGP) in Vietnam. The project aimed to contribute to the protection of the Thu Bon River estuary from wave-induced erosion and to support the conservation of the Cam Thanh nipa palm forest in connection with sustainable resource use.

At the broader landscape scale, the UNESCO Man and the Biosphere (MAB) information portal describes the Cù Lao Chàm – Hội An Biosphere Reserve as comprising two core zones: the Hội An Ancient Town World Heritage Site and the Cù Lao Chàm archipelago. The description also refers to wetland landforms and sedimentary environments located to the east of Hoi An, including areas within the communes of Cẩm Châu, Cẩm An, and Cẩm Thanh.
