= Trà Quế Vegetable Village =

Village in Quảng Nam Province, Việt Nam

- Location: Cẩm Hà Commune, Hội An, Quảng Nam, Việt Nam
- Designation: Traditional Agricultural Village

Trà Quế Vegetable Village is a traditional herb and vegetable farming village located in Cẩm Hà Commune, about 3 kilometers northeast of the Hội An Old Town, in Quảng Nam Province, Việt Nam. The village is known for its long-standing agricultural traditions, particularly the cultivation of aromatic herbs, and for its development as a community-based tourism destination. The farming area covers approximately 18 hectares and involves more than 200 households with over 300 direct agricultural workers. In 2022, the traditional farming practices of Trà Quế were officially recognized as a National Intangible Cultural Heritage by the Ministry of Culture, Sports and Tourism of Vietnam. In 2024, the village was further recognized by UN Tourism as one of the Best Tourism Villages.

== Location ==
Tra Que is situated on a small river islet between the Cổ Cò River and the Trà Quế Lagoon, close to the sea. This location provides favorable natural conditions, including a mild climate and fertile soil composed of alluvial sediment mixed with sand. These conditions are well suited for growing a wide range of vegetables and herbs, especially aromatic varieties such as basil, coriander, and Vietnamese mint. A distinctive feature of local farming is the use of organic fertilizers, particularly seaweed collected from nearby lagoons, which contributes to the unique flavor and quality of the produce.

== History ==
The village is believed to have been established in the 16th century and gradually developed into a traditional farming community closely linked to the economic and cultural life of Hội An. Vegetable cultivation became the main occupation of local residents, supplying fresh produce to surrounding areas and supporting the region's culinary traditions. The farming techniques and knowledge used in Trà Quế have been passed down through generations and are considered part of local folk knowledge and traditional practices.

== Production ==
Trà Quế has a cultivation area of around 18 hectares with 202 farming households and approximately 326 direct laborers. The agricultural system is based on small-scale household production, reflecting a sustainable model of rural farming. The knowledge and practices associated with vegetable cultivation in Trà Quế are classified as part of traditional craftsmanship and folk knowledge, which led to their recognition as a National Intangible Cultural Heritage under Decision No. 784/QĐ-BVHTTDL issued in April 2022.

== Architecture ==
Tourism in Trà Quế began to develop in 2003 when Hội An introduced the village as a rural tourism destination. Visitors can participate in hands-on farming activities such as preparing soil, planting, watering, and harvesting vegetables, allowing them to experience daily agricultural life. The village also offers cooking classes that use freshly harvested ingredients, providing a farm-to-table experience. Trà Quế is often regarded as a successful example of community-based tourism, where traditional livelihoods are preserved while generating sustainable income for local residents.

== Best Tourism Village 2024 ==
On November 15, 2024, Trà Quế was officially recognized as a Best Tourism Village by UN Tourism at an international event held in Cartagena, Colombia. The village was selected from more than 260 candidates representing 60 countries and was the only representative from Vietnam recognized that year. The program promotes rural tourism aligned with the United Nations Sustainable Development Goals, focusing on sustainability, cultural preservation, and community development. The official certificate was later awarded in Quảng Nam Province in December 2024 during activities related to the Best Tourism Villages Network.

As outdoor activities are the main focus at Tra Que Vegetable Village, the best time to visit is between February and April or September and December each year, when the weather is typically dry and mild.

== Cau Bong Festival ==
The Cầu Bông Festival is a traditional cultural event associated with the agricultural community of Trà Quế, held annually on the seventh day of the first lunar month. The festival includes ritual ceremonies to pray for favorable weather and good harvests, along with community activities and traditional performances such as bài chòi singing and lion dances. It reflects the spiritual beliefs and communal life of local farmers.

== Cultural sites ==
The village includes several cultural and spiritual sites such as a Cham-era stone well, guardian deity temples, shrines dedicated to the Five Elements, and the tomb of Nguyen Van Dien. These elements are closely connected to local folk beliefs and agricultural practices, forming an important part of the cultural and spiritual landscape of Trà Quế Village.
