= Hội An =

Hội An may refer to several places in Vietnam:

- Hội An, Da Nang, a ward established from the Old Town quarter of the former Hội An city
- Hội An, An Giang, a commune in the former Chợ Mới district
- Hội An (city), a former provincial municipality of Quảng Nam province, dissolved in 2025
- Hội An Ancient Town, the historic port town and UNESCO World Heritage Site
