= Cua Dai Bridge =

Cua Dai Bridge Cầu Cửa Đại
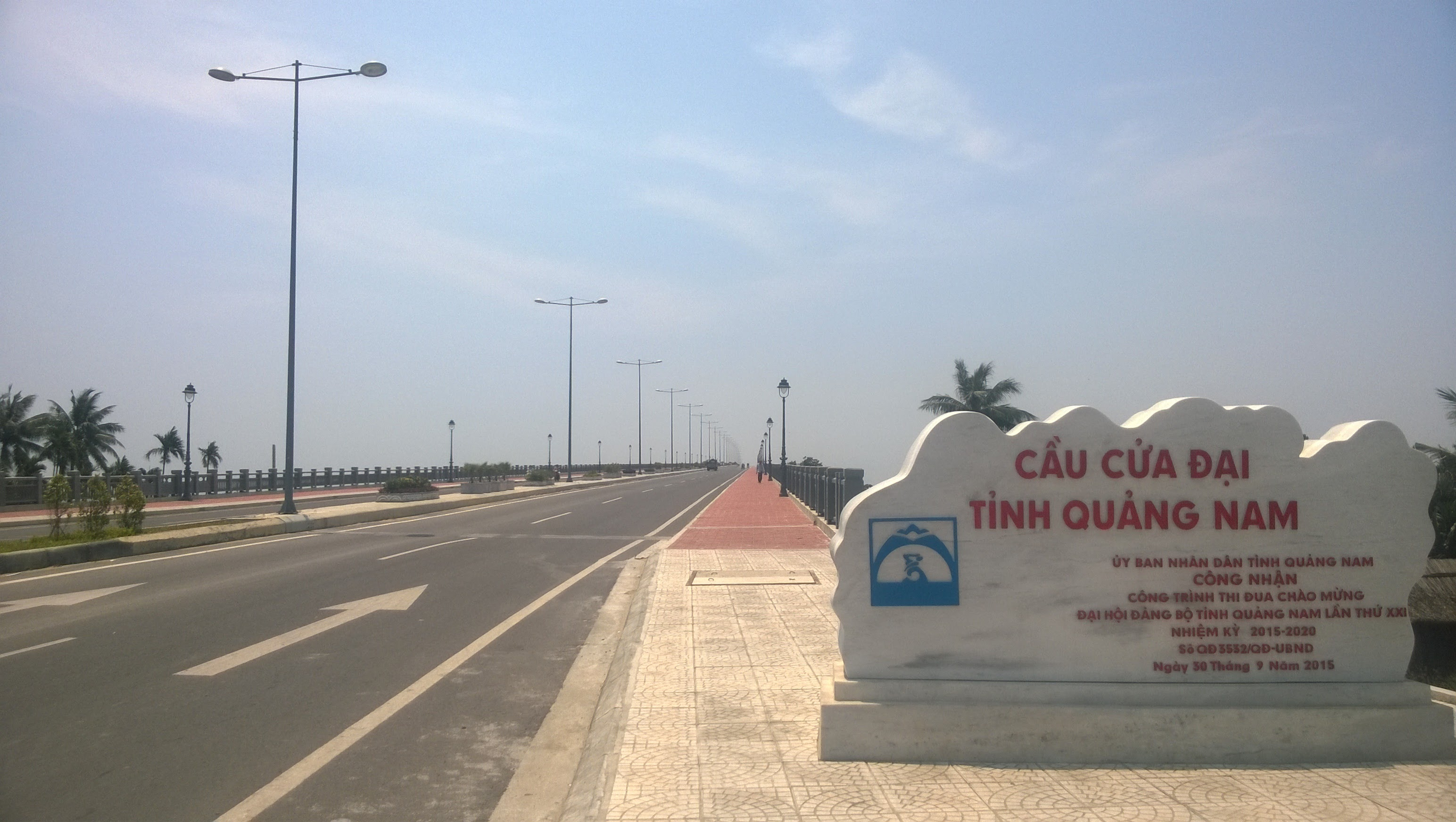
- Coordinates: 15°51′56″N 108°22′34″E
- Carries: Vehicles, Pedestrians
- Crosses: Thu Bồn River
- Locale: Quang Nam Province, Vietnam

Characteristics
- Design: cantilever
- Material: Prestressed concrete
- Width: 25.5 metres (84 ft)
- Longest span: 1,482 metres (4,862 ft)

History
- Construction start: August 31, 2009
- Opened: March 27, 2016

Location
- Interactive map of Cua Dai Bridge

Cua Dai Bridge (Vietnamese: Cầu Cửa Đại), is a cable-stayed bridge that crosses the Thu Bồn River in Quang Nam Province, Vietnam.

== Construction ==
In June 2009, a VND2 trillion (US$111 million) infrastructure budget was approved, which included resources allocated for the Cua Dai Bridge project. In August 2009, a groundbreaking ceremony marked the start of construction on the bridge.

Cua Dai was built using the balanced cantilever method made with concrete spans. The structure consists of prestressed reinforced concrete and reinforced concrete. At 150 meters, it has the longest cantilever span in Vietnam. The bridge is the longest in Quang Nam Province. By the completion of construction, the project would cost 3,450 billion VND. Cua Dai bridge was built as part of a larger 18,300 metres (60,039 ft) road project, which includes the 4,780 metres (15,682 ft) kilometer road from Hoi An, a 12,040 metres (39,501 ft) kilometer roads from Duy Xuyen District, and the 1,482 metres (4,862 ft) of the bridge itself.

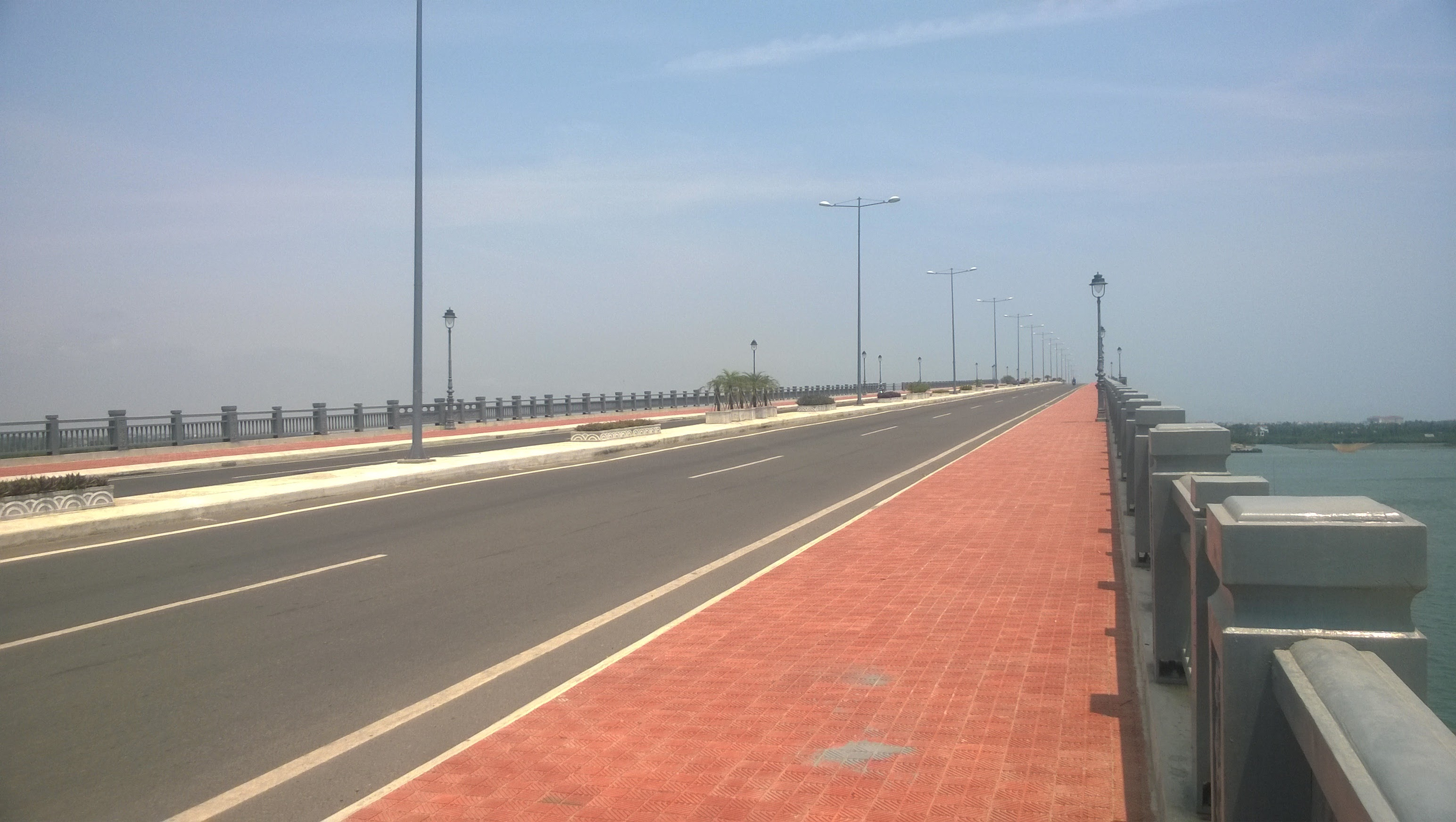

== Operation ==
In 2016, the bridge was open for traffic on a trial basis, establishing a direct route in Hoi An between Duy Xuyên and Thăng Bình districts. Previous to the bridge's construction, local commuters were required to use the distant Tra Khuc II Bridge or embark on small boats to cross the wide Thu Bon River. Officials estimate that despite the districts being only 2km apart as the crow flies, motorists would travel 20 kilometers of distance by using the Tra Khuc II Bridge. The bridge has an expected lifespan of 100 years.

The bridge also serves as a major connection within a coastal road project that would go through North, Central, and Southern regions of Vietnam. The bridge expanded the maritime capacity of the provinces within Vietnam's Central region, including an expansion of Kỳ Hà Port. In addition to reducing daily traveling time, the bridge is also serves a role in preventing storms and floods, aiding with emergency evacuation, and connecting the banks of the world heritage sites of Old Town Hội An and the Mỹ Sơn temple complex.
