= Hội An Ancient Town =

Hoi An Ancient Town
- Phố cổ Hội An (Vietnamese)
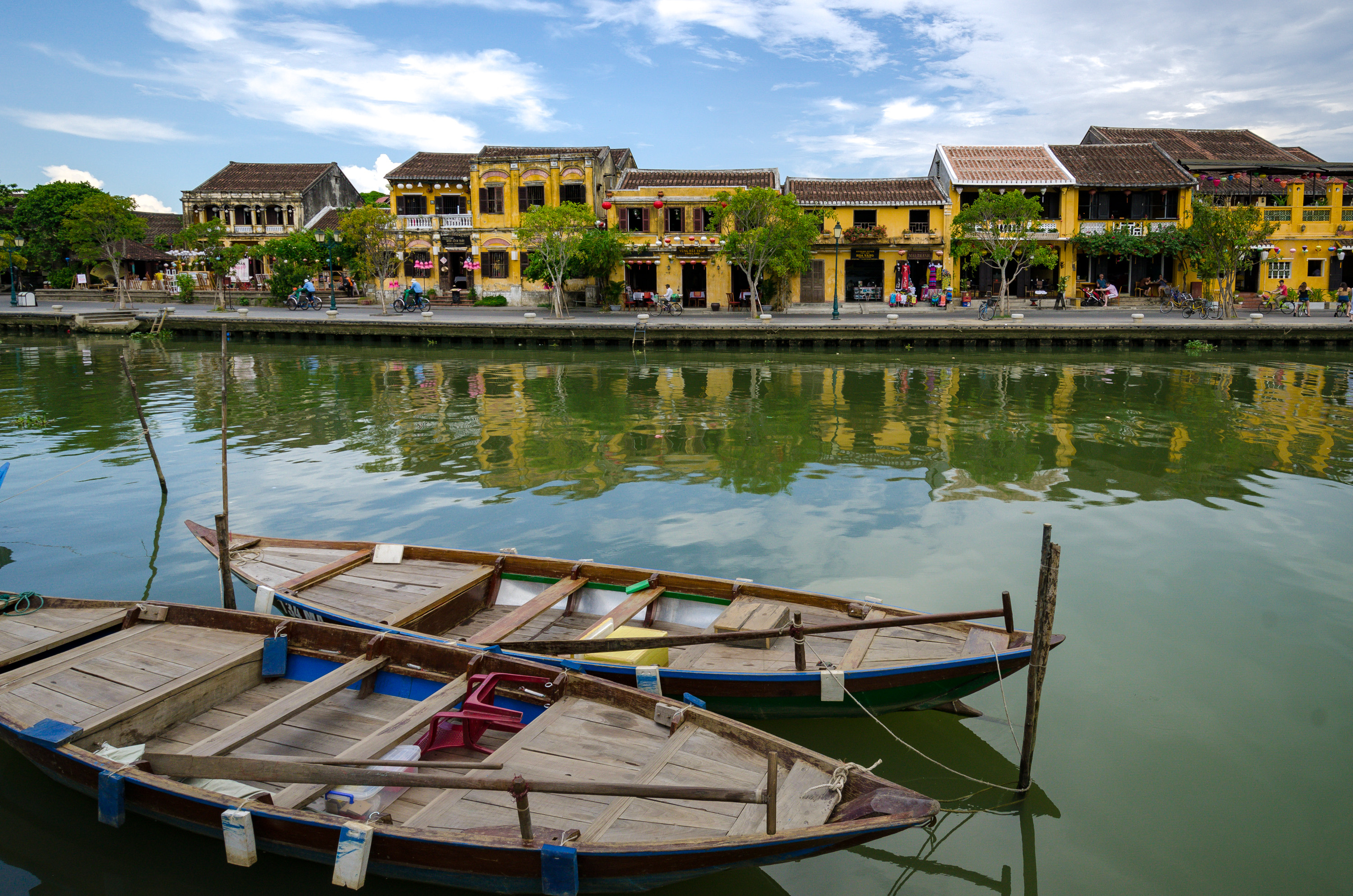
- A longboat in front of the ancient city's houses, 2017
- Interactive map of Hoi An Ancient Town
- 15°53′0″N 108°20′0″E
- Location: Hoi An, Vietnam

History
- Formed: 16th century

Site notes
- Area: 30 hectares (74 acres)

UNESCO World Heritage Site
- Designated: 4 December 1999
- Reference no.: 948

Hoi An Ancient Town (Vietnamese: Phố cổ Hội An) is a heritage site and ancient trading post located in Hoi An, which served as an important trading post for foreign traders to Vietnam from the 15th until the 19th century, the status of which is still partly maintained by the newer city today. The ancient town contains a network of buildings and structures, consisting of 1360 ancient and unique monuments & heritage sites, including 1068 preserved houses and the Japanese Bridge. This ancient town is currently listed as a UNESCO World Heritage Site, having been listed as one starting from December 12, 1999. It is Vietnam's most heavily visited site with about 4.4 millions visitors in 2024.

== History ==
Hoi An is located on a patch of land, located downstream of the Thu Bồn River, some 28 km south of what would eventually become the city of Da Nang. This patch of land was initially part of the Sa Huỳnh culture, and eventually was claimed by the Kingdom of Champa from the beginning of the 2nd century. Under Cham rule, this region was transformed into one of the kingdom's key and essential foreign trading ports for goods and services, once serving as a stop and trading post on the maritime Silk Road.

Starting from around the end of the 15th century, the area started to receive an influx of Vietnamese residents, allowing the area to fall into the control of the Vietnamese Nguyễn clan. Later, by the start of the 17th century, the town would start to experience a steady flow of Chinese and Japanese residents arriving to the town to immigrate and trade, which helped to create a series of diverse neighborhoods and streets inside the ancient town itself. This level of immigration caused the port and city of Hoi An to experience extreme economic growth, becoming one of the busiest trading posts in Southeast Asia, a status of which it would hold for the next couple of centuries.

However, during the 19th century, the port of Hoi An started to slowly stagnate and decline, which allowed for the newer city of Da Nang to develop its sea and trading posts. However, the stagnation and decline of the old trading posts' activities, along with the lack of economic incentives in the town, has also led to the entire old port town itself being remarkably preserved over the centuries, with its complex of timber-framed buildings still standing today.

== Architecture ==
Hoi An's ancient town contains a lot of unique architectural traits, each of which was contributed in part by each of the civilizations that have settled here over its history.

Under Champa rule, the town gained its ports and docks, along with various structures and old wells that were left behind by the kingdom, including Trảng Sỏi 1, an archeological site. Those historical artifacts have managed to survive until today.

However, the most defining features of the town's architectural traits generally comes from the influx of immigrants that the old trading post has managed to receive from the start of the 17th century, mainly due to its status as a major trading post in the region at the time. One of the types of immigrants that have managed to settle here over its history as a trading post are the Chinese, who built a total of five assembly halls around the old port city itself, of which one was used as a central assembly hall. Those halls were built in accordance with the traditional Chinese architectural styles, with the harmony, balancing, and aesthetical components being especially considered while building. The Japanese immigrants has also significantly contributed to the architecture of this city as well, of which the most notable of their structures is a 10-metre long wooden bridge constructed at the start of the 17th century, named the Japanese bridge (cầu Nhật Bản). The French colonization of the old port town in the 19th century also brought with it some extremely significant changes to the town's architecture, the most notable of which were the construction of French-style townhouses on the town's streets.

Over the various stages of its history, however, the ancient town was still able to maintain its original street plan, which had been developed as the town turned into a major trading post. This street plan, along with the town's various historical structures, present a traditional townscape typical of 17th- and 18th-century towns, of which is remarkably and intactly preserved.

== Preservation ==
Due to the old port town's economic stagnation and decline since the start of the 19th century, the town has not suffered from new development or the replacement of old materials with newer ones. In 1985, the town was classified by the government as a National Cultural Heritage Site; and subsequently as a Special National Cultural Heritage Site in 2009. The entire town is owned by the Vietnamese government, which has taken some major steps to effectively preserve the town, including the establishment of a 280-hectare buffer zone; along with the organization of various cultural activities, aiming to attract attention to the cultural heritage of this area.

Due to its cultural and historical importance, the old port town was classified as a UNESCO World Heritage Site on December 12, 1999.

Hoi An sits on UNESCO's climate risk list. Cua Dai Beach is losing 10 to 20 metres a year, linked to upstream dams. This is being addressed by pedestrian-only access n the old town during peak hours and a strategy to disperse tourists to peripheral villages.

== Gallery ==
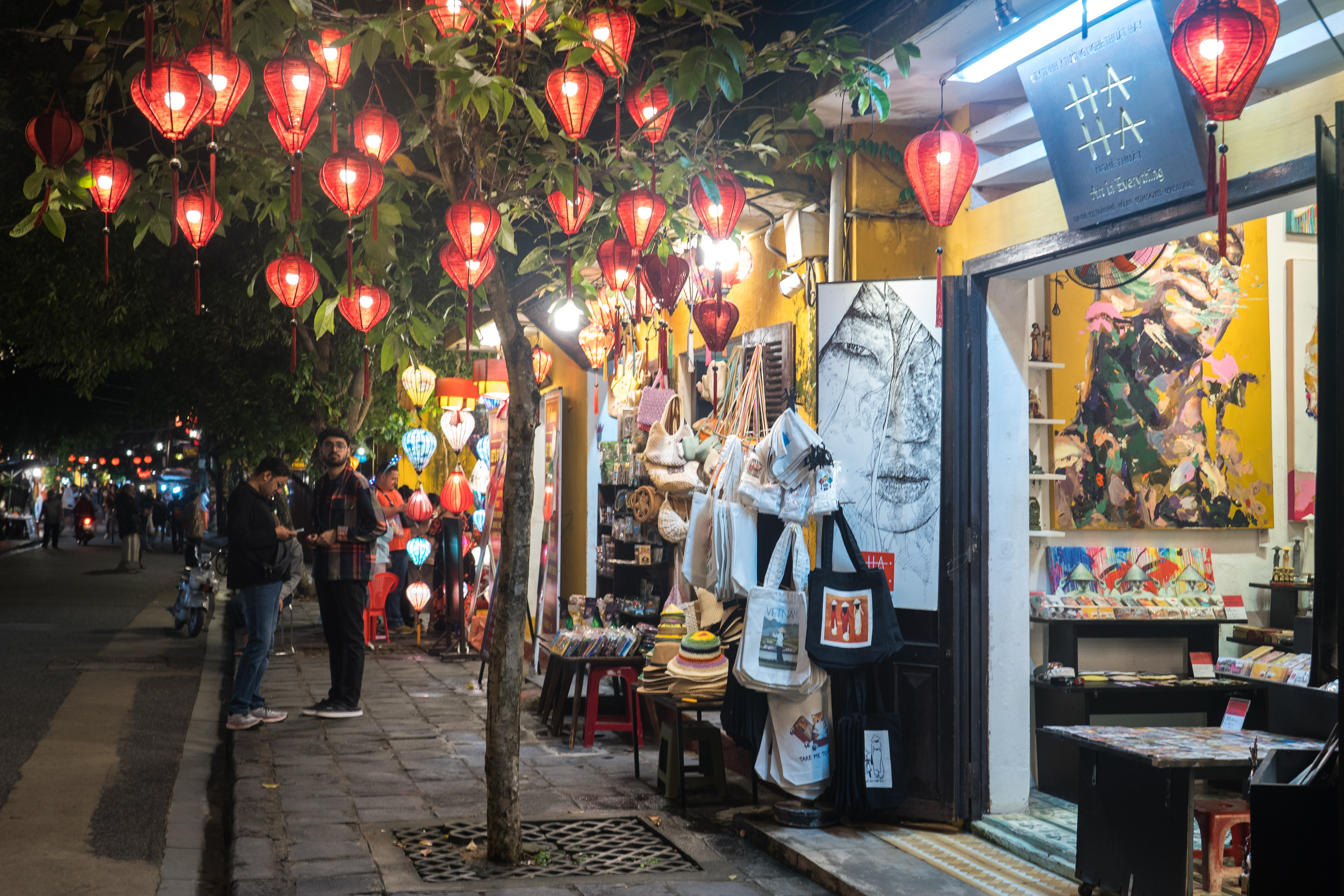
A typical streetscene in the ancient town, at night

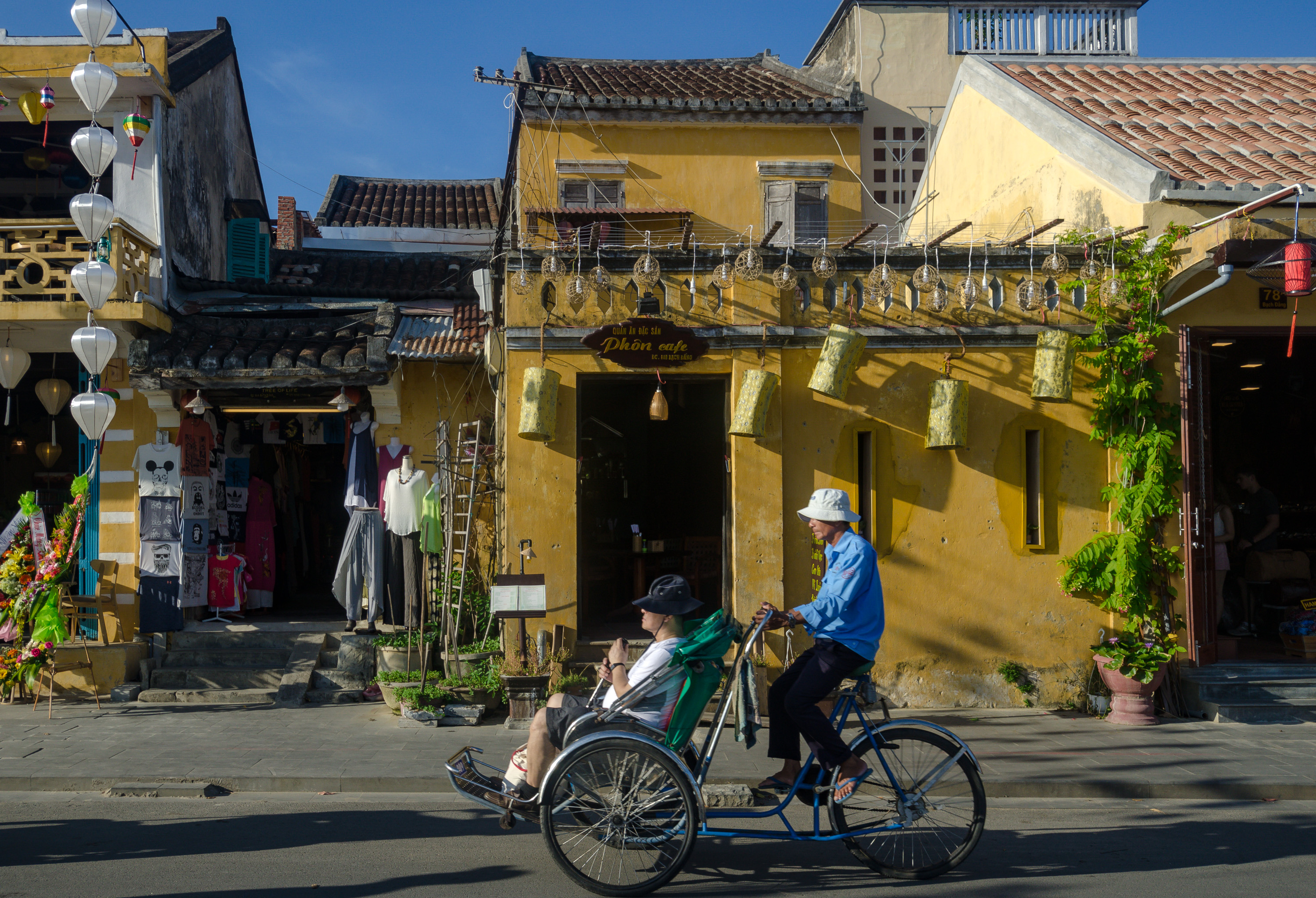
Typical shops and streetscape in Hoi An's ancient town, in daylight

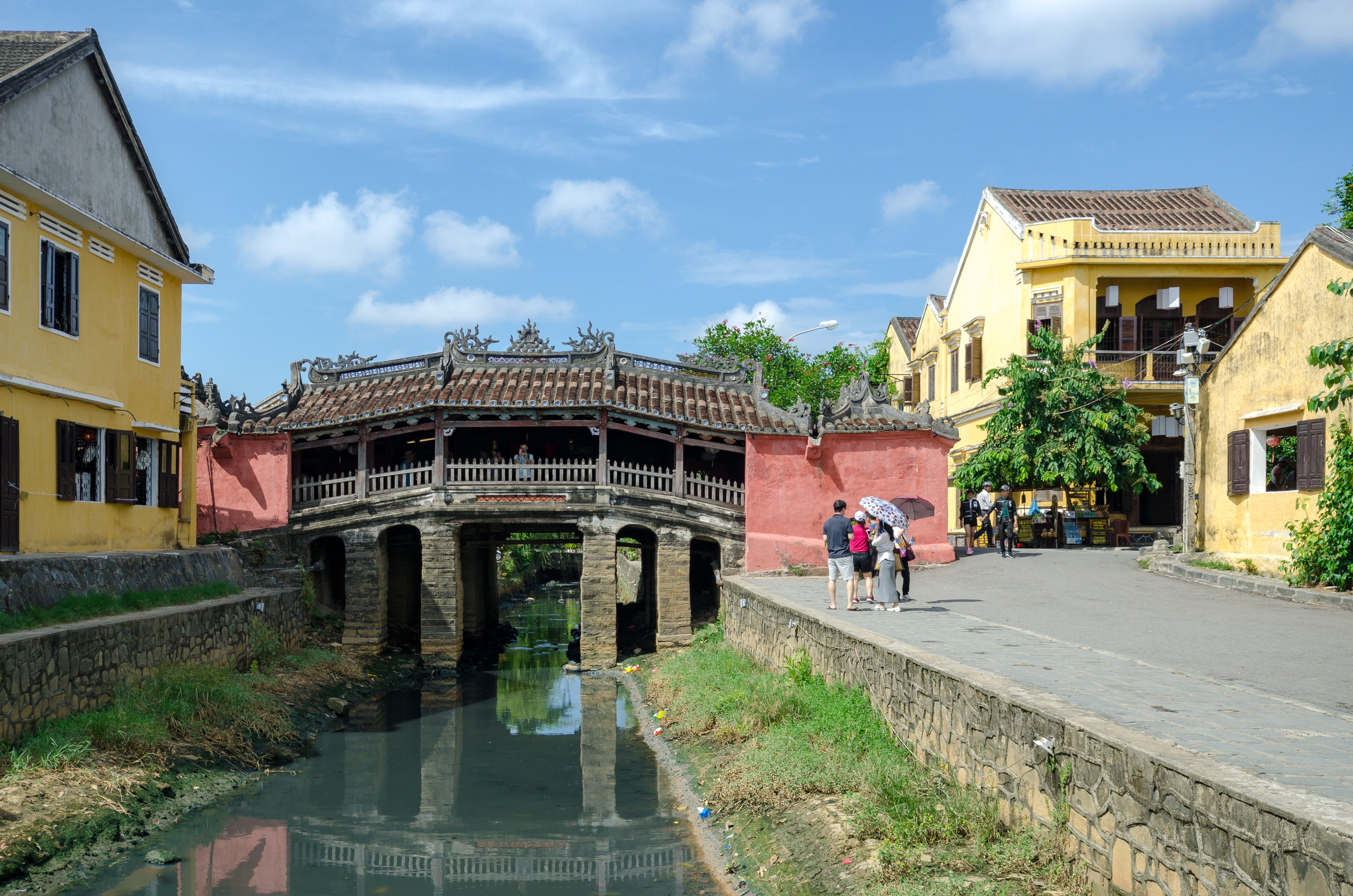
The old city's famous wooden bridge, built by the Japanese

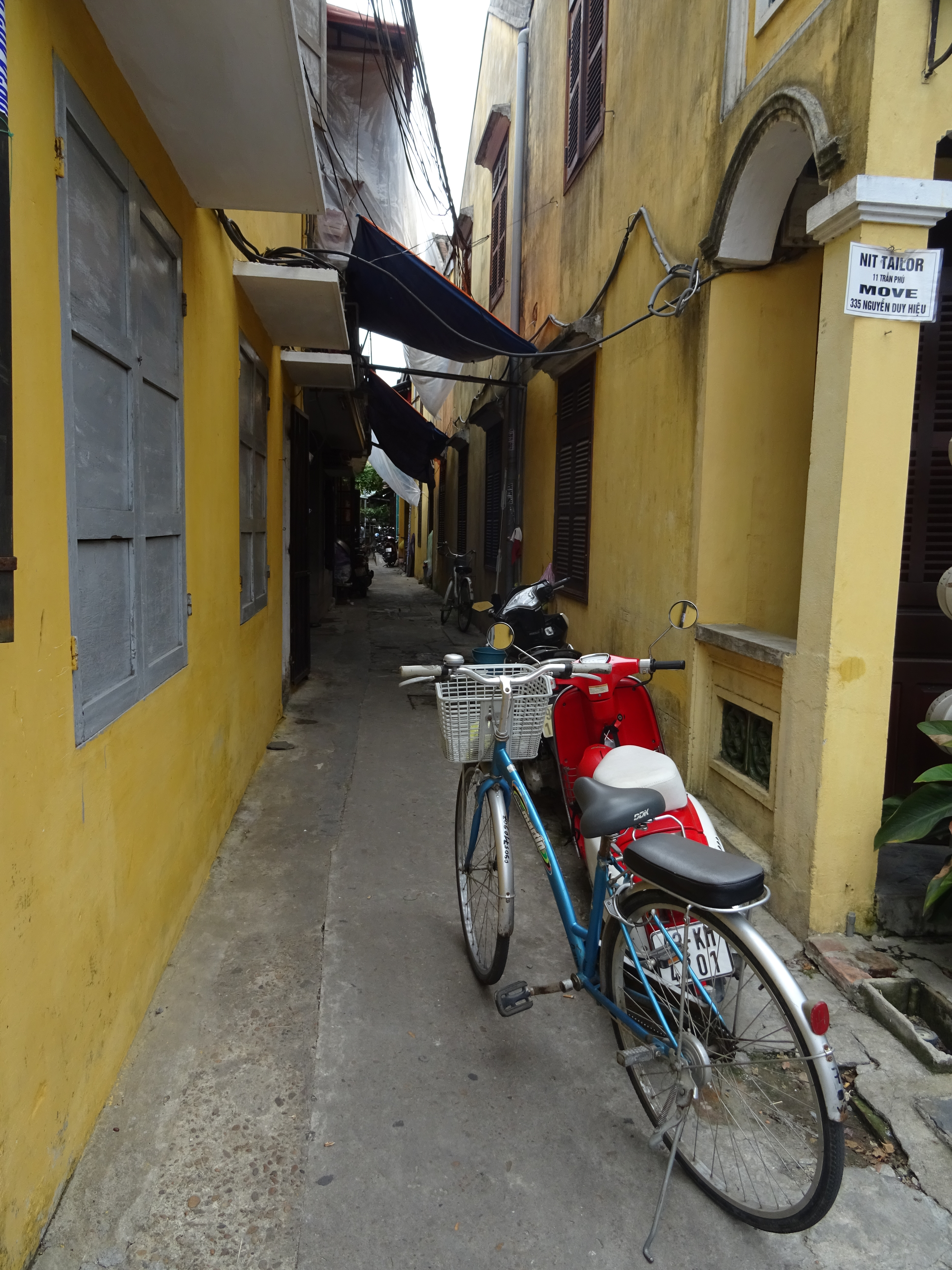
A typical alleyway in Hoi An's ancient town

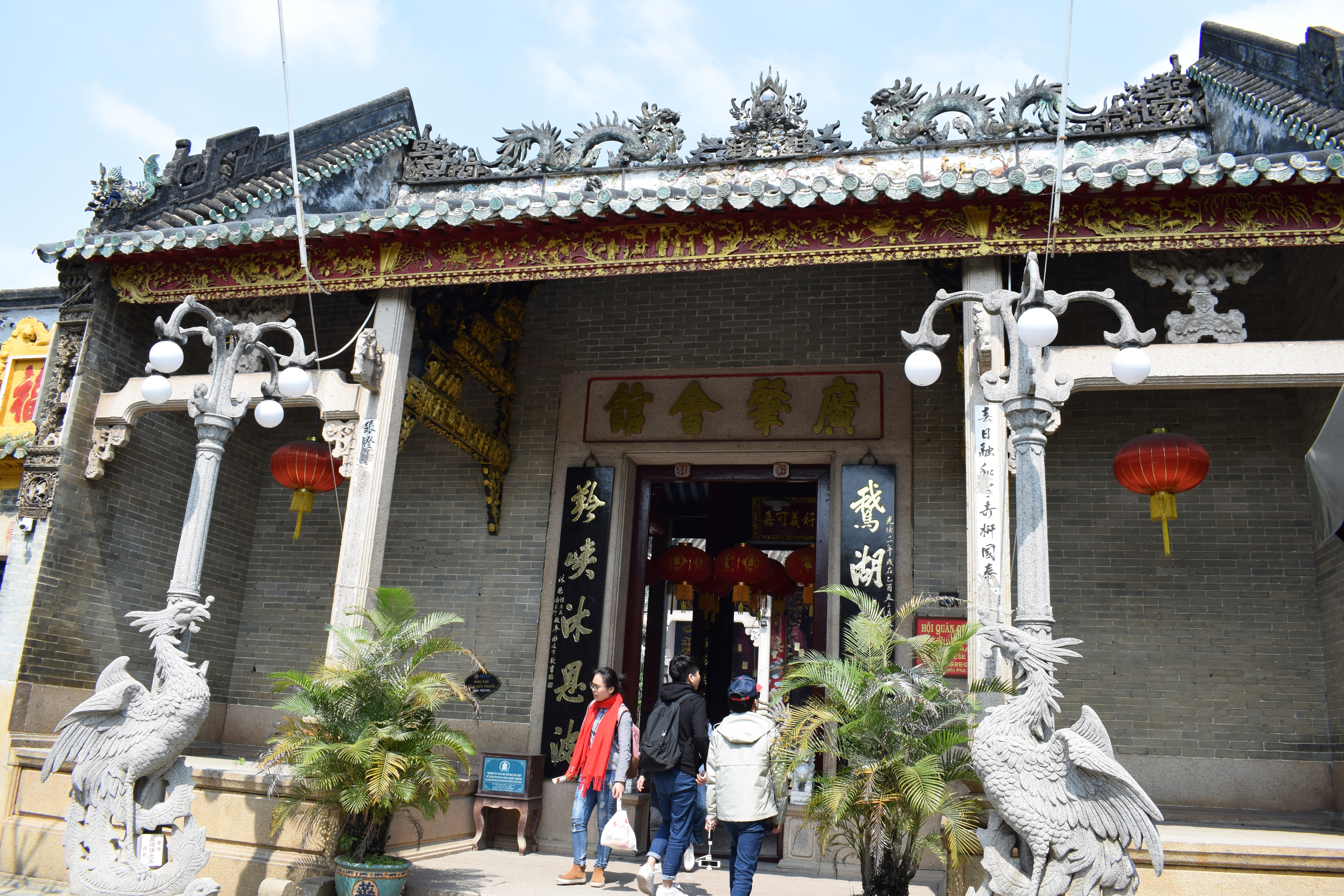
One of the many Chinese-built temples in Hoi An's ancient town

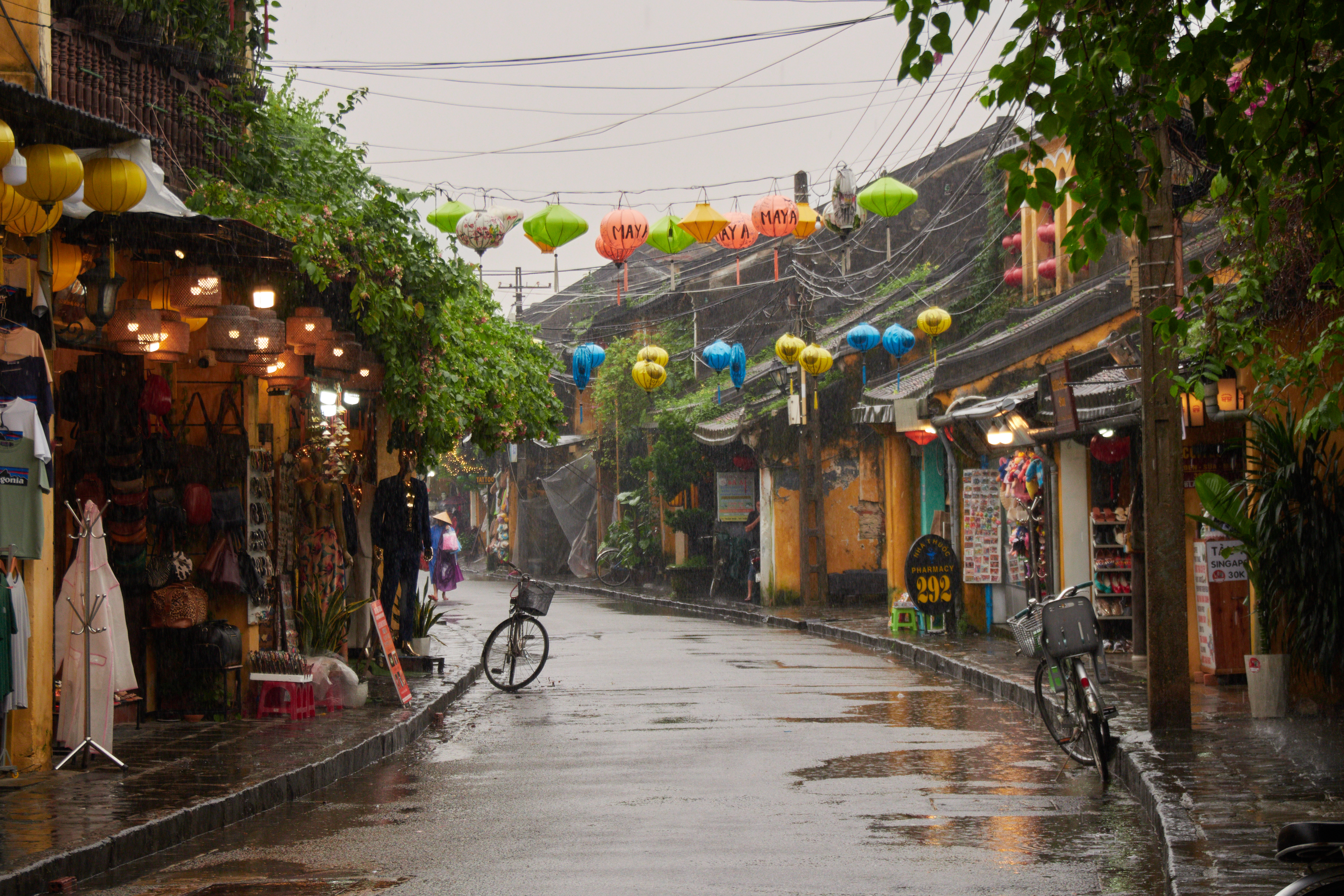
Street scene on a rainy day

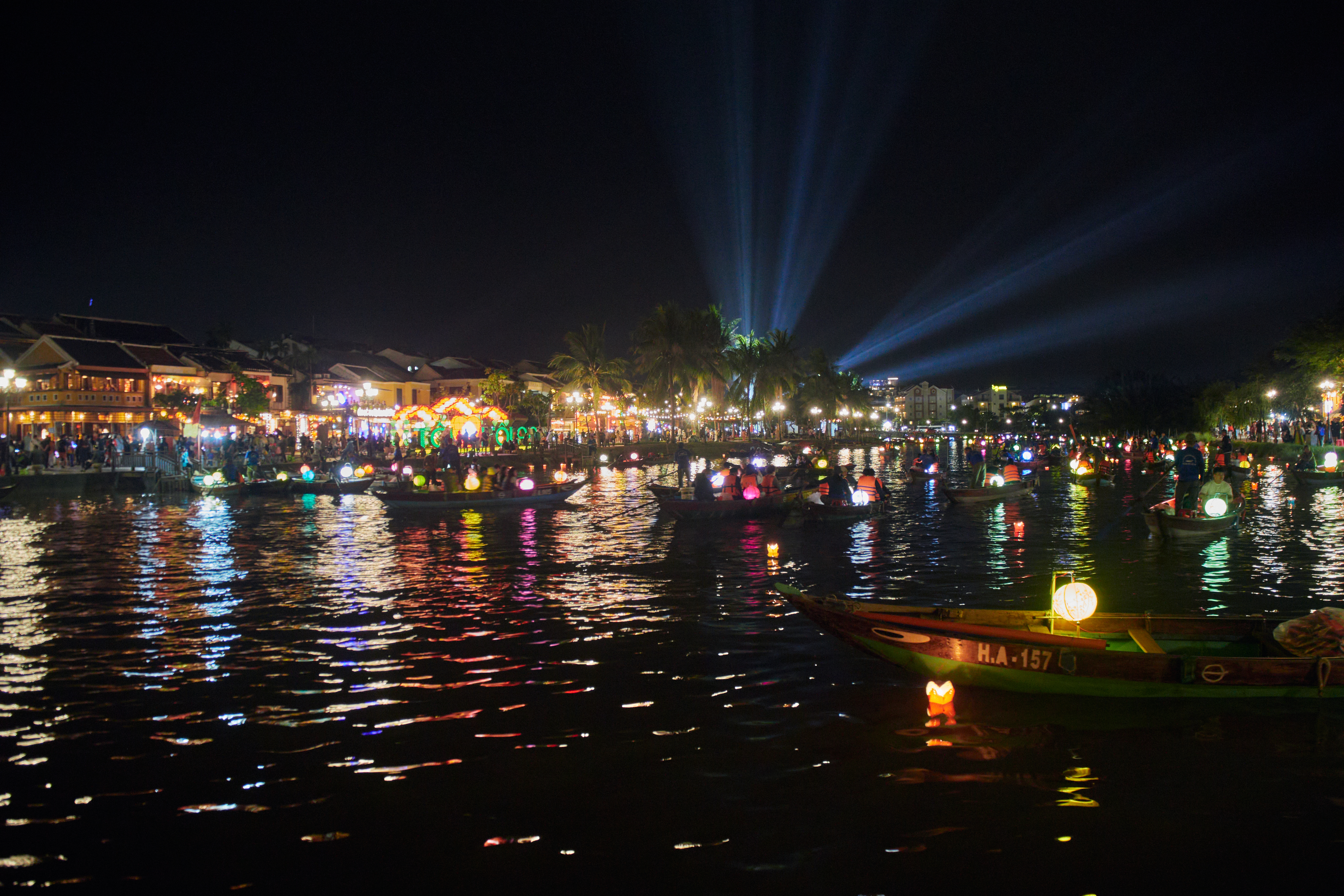
Hoai River at night

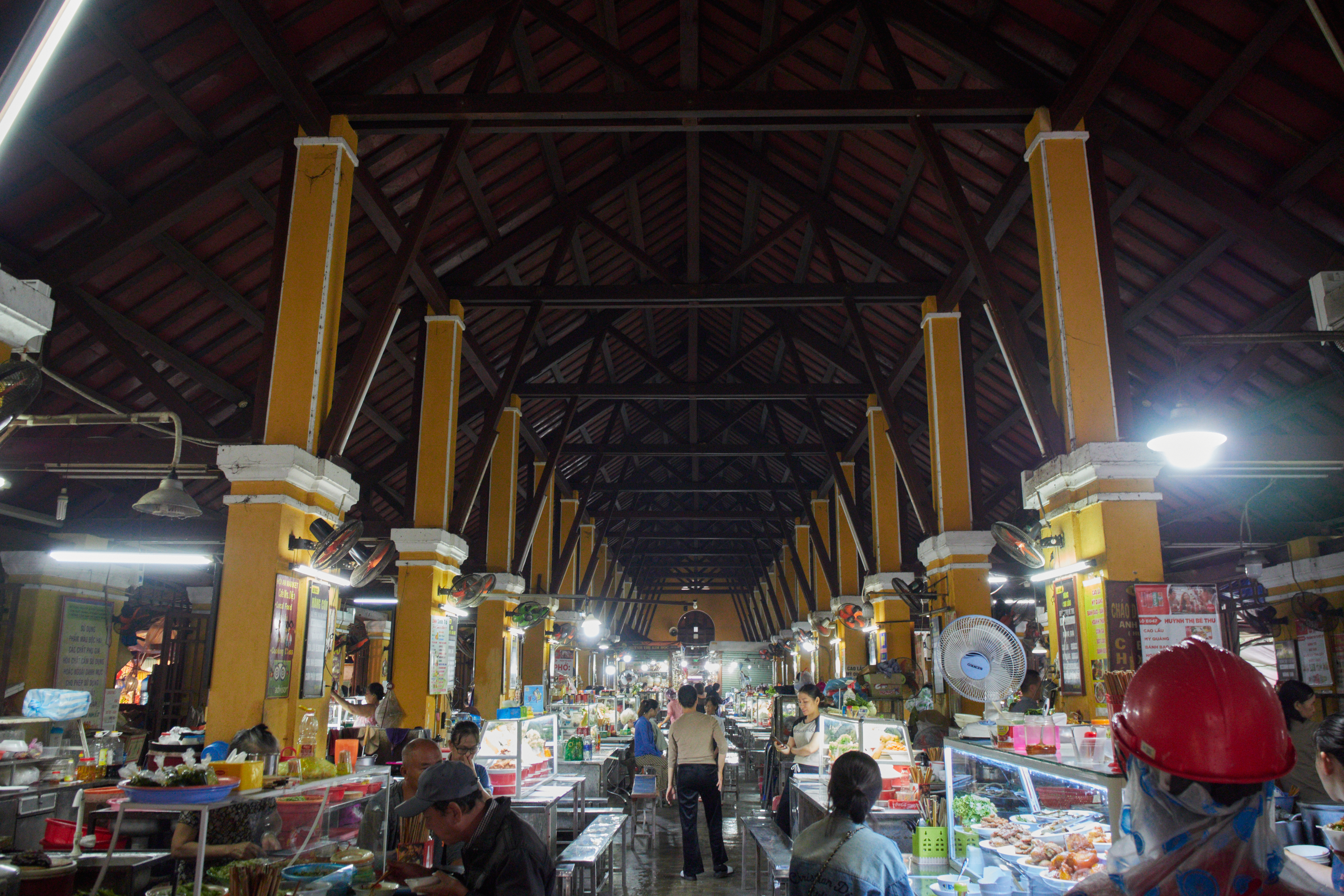
Central Market
