= Ô Chợ Dừa =

Ô Chợ Dừa Ward Phường Ô Chợ Dừa Thịnh Hào phường
- Ward (Class-II)
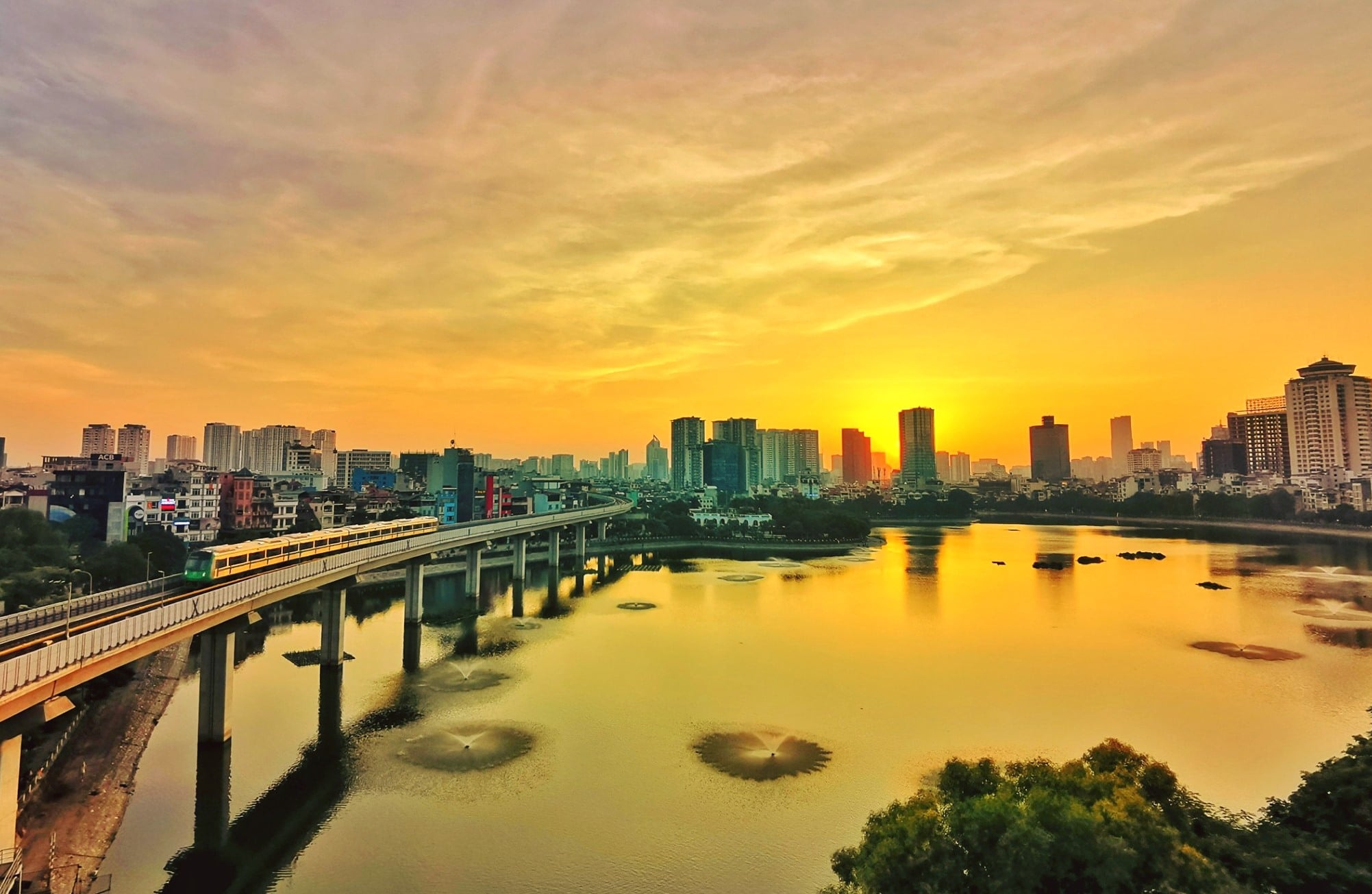
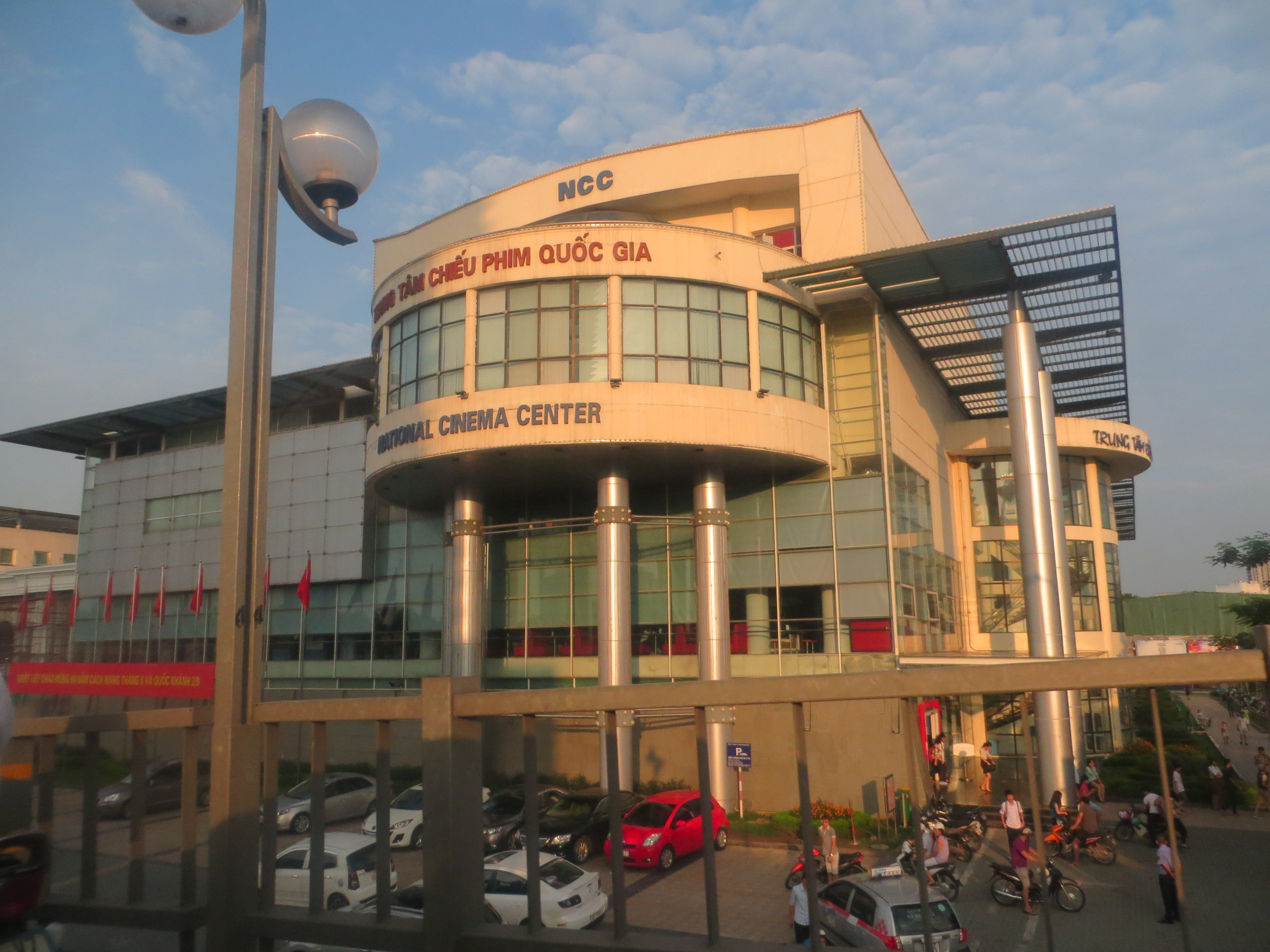
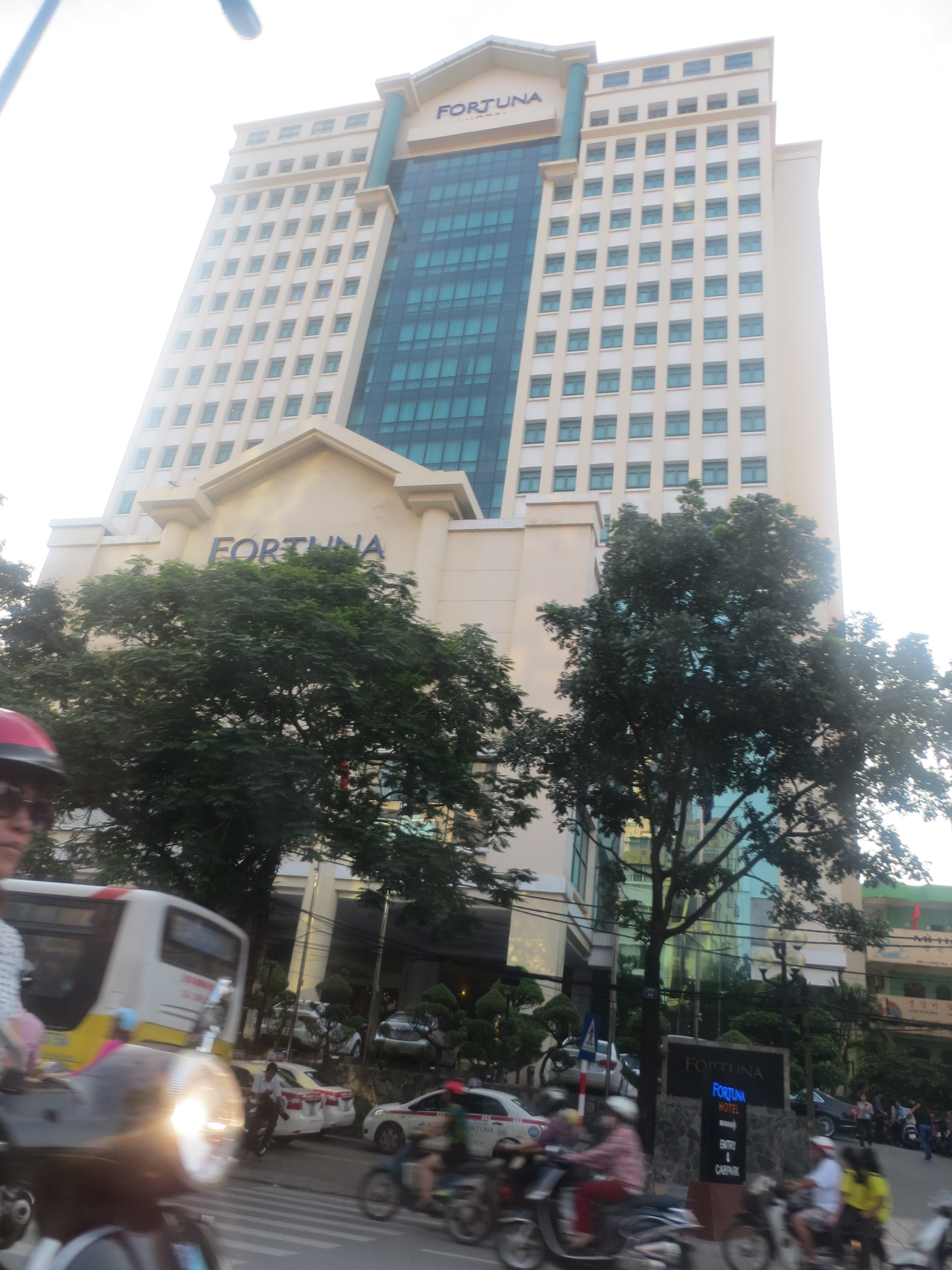
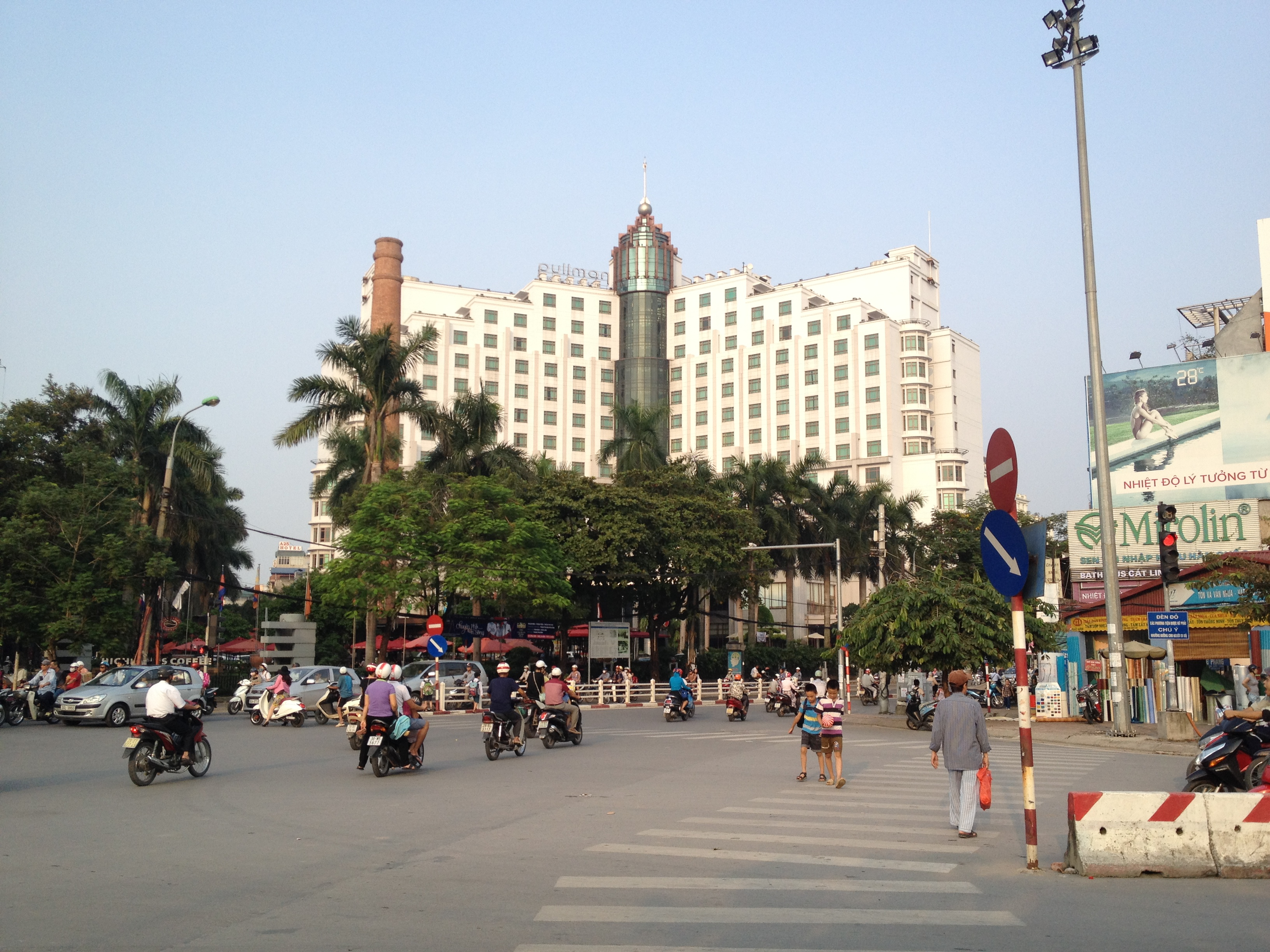
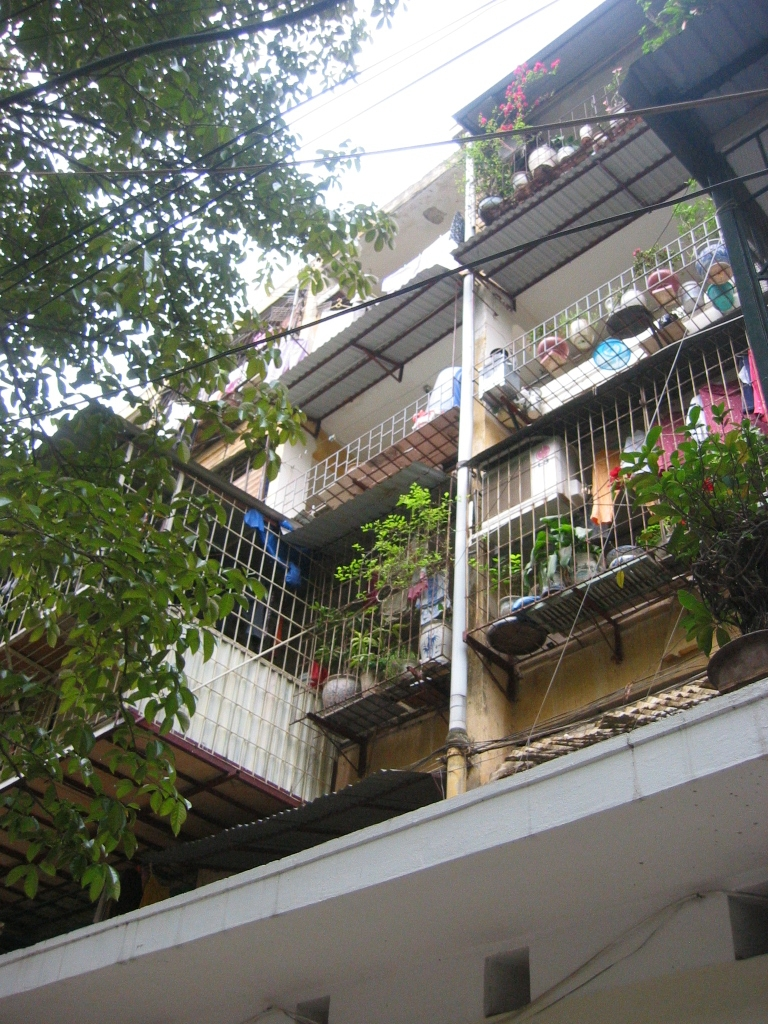
- From top, left to right : Hoàng Cầu Lake with Hanoi Metro Line 2A, National Cinema Center, Fortuna Hotel, Pullman Hotel, and Trung Tự Apartment Building.
- Nickname: "The Green Heart" (Trái Tim Xanh)
- Country: Vietnam
- Region: Red River Delta
- Municipality: Hà Nội
- Establishment: 1009 (village); July 1, 2025 (Note: From July 1, 2025, Hanoi officially put into operation 126 new commune and ward-level administrative units according to Resolution No. 1656/NQ-UBTVQH15 of the National Assembly Standing Committee.) (ward)
- Central hall: No.61, Hoàng Cầu Street, Ô Chợ Dừa Ward

Government
  - Type: Ward-level authority
  - People Committee's Chairman: Lê Tuấn Định
  - People Council's Chairman: Lê Ngọc Hân
  - Front Committee's Chairman: Đào Thị Minh Hiền
  - Party Committee's Secretary: Nguyễn Thị Thanh Yên

Area
  - Total: 1.83 km^{2} (0.71 sq mi)

Population (July 1, 2025)
  - Total: 71,293
  - Density: 39,000/km^{2} (101,000/sq mi)
  - Ethnicities: Kinh; Tanka; Others
- Time zone: UTC+7 (Indochina Time)
- ZIP code: 10000–11511 (Note: An official code from December 31, 2023, to present.)
- Climate: Cwa
- Website: Ochodua.Hanoi.gov.vn; Ochodua.Hanoi.dcs.vn

Ô Chợ Dừa [o˧˧:ʨə̰ːʔ˨˩:zɨ̤ə˨˩] is a ward of Hanoi, the capital city in the Red River Delta of Vietnam.

== History ==
Its name Ô Chợ Dừa is explained as originating from the common name of one of the five gates of Hanoi the old citadel, (Note: "Hà Nội năm cửa ô", means "Hanoi with the five quarter gates".) what means "the quarter of the coconut market".

=== Middle Ages ===
According to Đại Việt sử ký toàn thư, the Lý Dynasty began building Thăng Long the new capital in 1009, and that is why the five gates were erected. In there, Thịnh Quang Quarter (盛光門, Thịnh Quang môn) was the official name of the southwest gate of the citadel, which lay at the bank of Tô Lịch River. Thịnh Quang was later renamed as Thịnh Hào. The area quickly developed into such a densely populated location that the court decided to establish an administrative unit called Thịnh Hào Ward (盛豪坊, Thịnh Hào phường). The stretch from the gate to the riverbank has been informally referred to as Hoàng Cầu Village (Note: Non-religious community.) (黄橋村, Hoàng Cầu thôn) and Thái Hà Hamlet (Note: Catholic community.) (泰河邑, Thái Hà ấp). These two informal administrative units were originally granted to two officials, who had many meritorious deeds, as their private real estate : Mai Anh Tuấn (Hoàng Cầu by the Nguyễn court) and Hoàng Cao Khải (Thái Hà by the French protecture). However, these officials did not have permanent ownership, so after their death, the authority took it back to redistribute to the common people. In any case, the greatest legacy that these two officials left for posterity was their contribution to the construction of two very famous works of Hanoi : Hoàng Cầu Communal Hall (đình Hoàng Cầu) and Shrine of Our Lady of Perpetual Help in Thái Hà (simply Thái Hà Church, Nhà thờ Thái Hà).

=== 20th century ===
When the Government of Tonkin began to re-plan Hanoi City in a new way from 1902, the area of Thịnh Hào Ward consisted of only two villages Hoàng Cầu and Thái Hà. Thịnh Hào has been allowed to dissolve to form three new wards Hoàng Cầu, Ô Chợ Dừa and Thái Hà.

In 1956, musician Đoàn Chuẩn and his some friends established a small space on Hào Nam Slope (dốc Hào Nam) called the Vietnam Music School (trường Âm nhạc Việt Nam). The institution quickly grew to become the Vietnam National Academy of Music (Học viện Âm nhạc Quốc gia Việt Nam), one of the leading music schools in Asia.

Until the late 1990s, the Hanoi City People's Committee approved a project that was considered unimaginable in the context of a very difficult national economy. The city authority boldly did not seek the consent of the people and localities to proceed with the recovery of the intersection area of the two villages Hoàng Cầu and Thái Hà, then provided funds to dig a regulating lake. It has a water surface area of 12.5 hectares with a 1,900m embankment length, which is used to store floodwater as well as provide clean water and fresh fish for part of Đống Đa Urban District. Currently, Hoàng Cầu Lake is in the process of upgrading and expanding to become the largest ecosystem in the city.

=== 21st century ===
According to Project No. 369/ĐA-CP dated May 9, 2025 of the Government of Vietnam on the arrangement of commune-level administrative units in the Hanoi Metropolitan Area 2025, new Ô Chợ Dừa Ward (phường Ô Chợ Dừa) was founded on natural and population conditions from :

- All of former wards Cát Linh, Điện Biên, Hàng Bột, Ô Chợ Dừa, Thành Công, Trung Liệt.
- Part of old Văn Miếu - Quốc Tử Giám Ward.

== Geography ==
=== Climate ===
Climate data for Ô Chợ Dừa Ward
Month	Jan	Feb	Mar	Apr	May	Jun	Jul	Aug	Sep	Oct	Nov	Dec	Year
Record high °C (°F)	33.3 (91.9)	35.1 (95.2)	37.2 (99.0)	41.5 (106.7)	42.8 (109.0)	41.8 (107.2)	40.8 (105.4)	39.7 (103.5)	37.4 (99.3)	36.6 (97.9)	36.0 (96.8)	31.9 (89.4)	42.8 (109.0)
Mean daily maximum °C (°F)	19.8 (67.6)	20.6 (69.1)	23.2 (73.8)	27.7 (81.9)	31.9 (89.4)	33.4 (92.1)	33.4 (92.1)	32.6 (90.7)	31.5 (88.7)	29.2 (84.6)	25.7 (78.3)	22.0 (71.6)	27.6 (81.7)
Daily mean °C (°F)	16.6 (61.9)	17.7 (63.9)	20.3 (68.5)	24.2 (75.6)	27.6 (81.7)	29.3 (84.7)	29.4 (84.9)	28.7 (83.7)	27.7 (81.9)	25.3 (77.5)	21.9 (71.4)	18.3 (64.9)	23.9 (75.0)
Mean daily minimum °C (°F)	14.5 (58.1)	15.8 (60.4)	18.4 (65.1)	21.9 (71.4)	24.8 (76.6)	26.4 (79.5)	26.5 (79.7)	26.1 (79.0)	25.2 (77.4)	22.8 (73.0)	19.3 (66.7)	15.8 (60.4)	21.5 (70.7)
Record low °C (°F)	2.7 (36.9)	5.0 (41.0)	7.0 (44.6)	9.8 (49.6)	15.4 (59.7)	20.0 (68.0)	21.0 (69.8)	20.9 (69.6)	16.1 (61.0)	12.4 (54.3)	6.8 (44.2)	5.1 (41.2)	2.7 (36.9)
Average rainfall mm (inches)	22.5 (0.89)	24.6 (0.97)	47.0 (1.85)	91.8 (3.61)	185.4 (7.30)	253.3 (9.97)	280.1 (11.03)	309.4 (12.18)	228.3 (8.99)	140.7 (5.54)	66.7 (2.63)	20.2 (0.80)	1,670.1 (65.75)
Average rainy days	9.5	11.4	15.9	13.7	14.6	14.8	16.6	16.5	13.2	9.7	6.8	5.2	147.9
Average relative humidity (%)	79.9	82.5	84.5	84.7	81.1	80.0	80.7	82.7	81.0	78.5	77.1	76.2	80.7
Mean monthly sunshine hours	68.7	48.1	45.5	87.4	173.7	167.0	181.1	163.0	162.4	150.3	131.6	113.0	1,488.5
Source 1: Vietnam Institute for Building Science and Technology
Source 2: Extremes (Note: All-time record high; Vietnamnet.vn (May record high and January record low only), Vietnamnet.vn (June record high only), Imh.ac.vn (August record high only), Nchmf.gov.vn, January record high, November record high, April and May record low in The Yearbook of Indochina)

== Culture ==
Hoàng Cầu Communal Hall (đình Hoàng Cầu) is one of the architectural works recognized by the Hanoi City People's Committee since 2018 as one of the special cultural and historical sites of the whole city. Currently, it is located in the center of expanded Ô Chợ Dừa Ward and is still in the process of embellishment.

== See also ==
- Ba Đình
- Cầu Giấy
- Đống Đa
- Giảng Võ
- Láng
- Nghĩa Đô
- Thanh Xuân
- Văn Miếu Quốc Tử Giám
- Yên Hòa
