= Giảng Võ =

Giảng Võ Phường Giảng Võ
- Ward (Class-II)
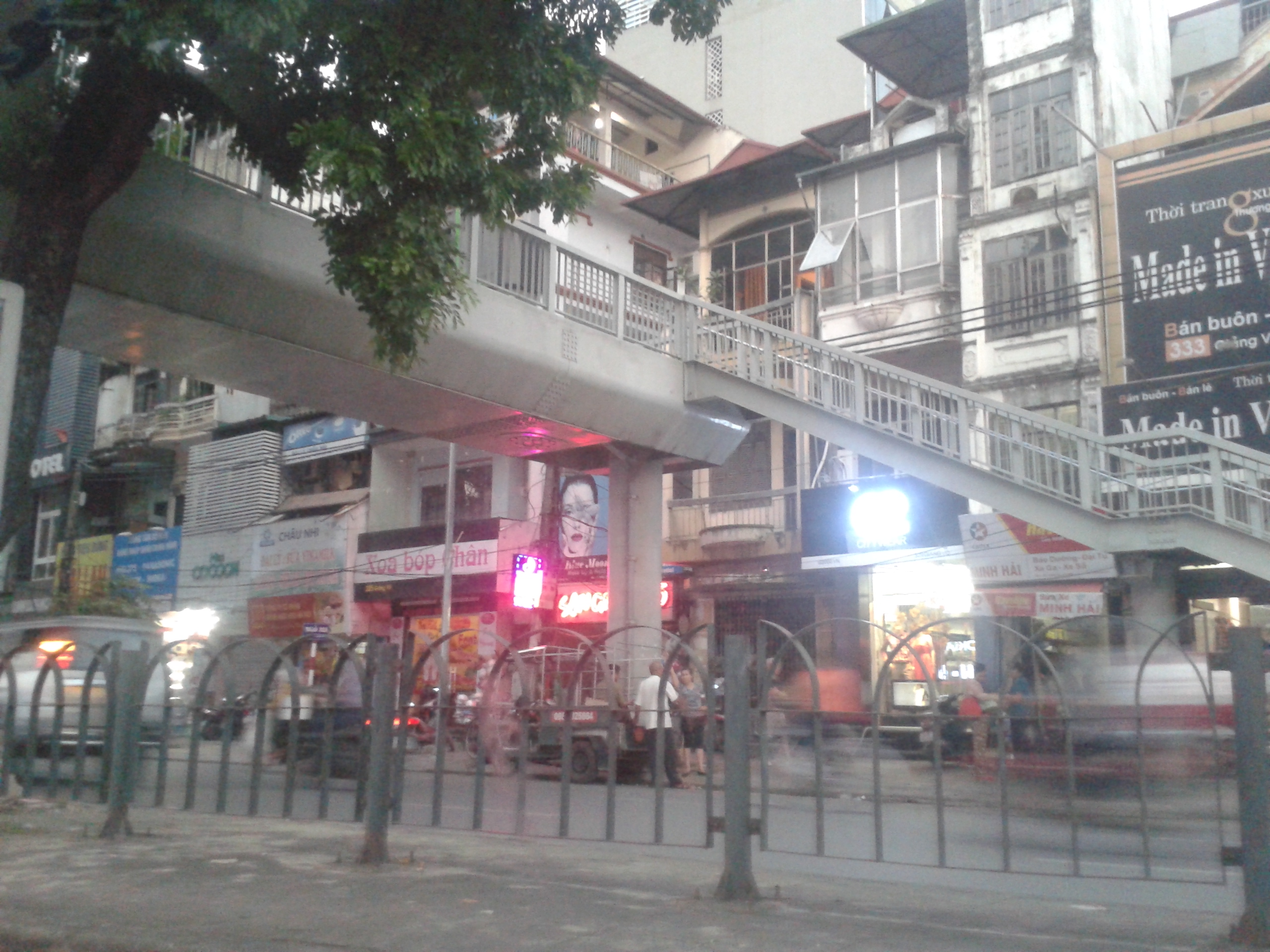
- Giảng Võ Street
- Interactive map of Giảng Võ
- Country: Vietnam
- Region: Northern Vietnam
- Subregion: Red River Delta
- Municipality: Hà Nội

Area
  - Total: 2.68 km^{2} (1.03 sq mi)

Population (2025)
  - Total: 93,536
  - Density: 34,900/km^{2} (90,400/sq mi)

Demographics
  - Ethnicities: Majority Kinh
- Time zone: UTC+7
- Postal code: 11110
- Administrative code: 00025
- Website: https://giangvo.hanoi.gov.vn/

Giảng Võ (Vietnamese: Phường Giảng Võ) is a ward of Hanoi, Vietnam. It is one of the 126 new wards, communes and special zones of the province following the reorganization in 2025.

== Geography ==
=== Adjacent wards ===
Giảng Võ is adjacent to seven wards:

- Nghĩa Đô
- Cầu Giấy
- Láng
- Đống Đa
- Ô Chợ Dừa
- Ba Đình
- Ngọc Hà

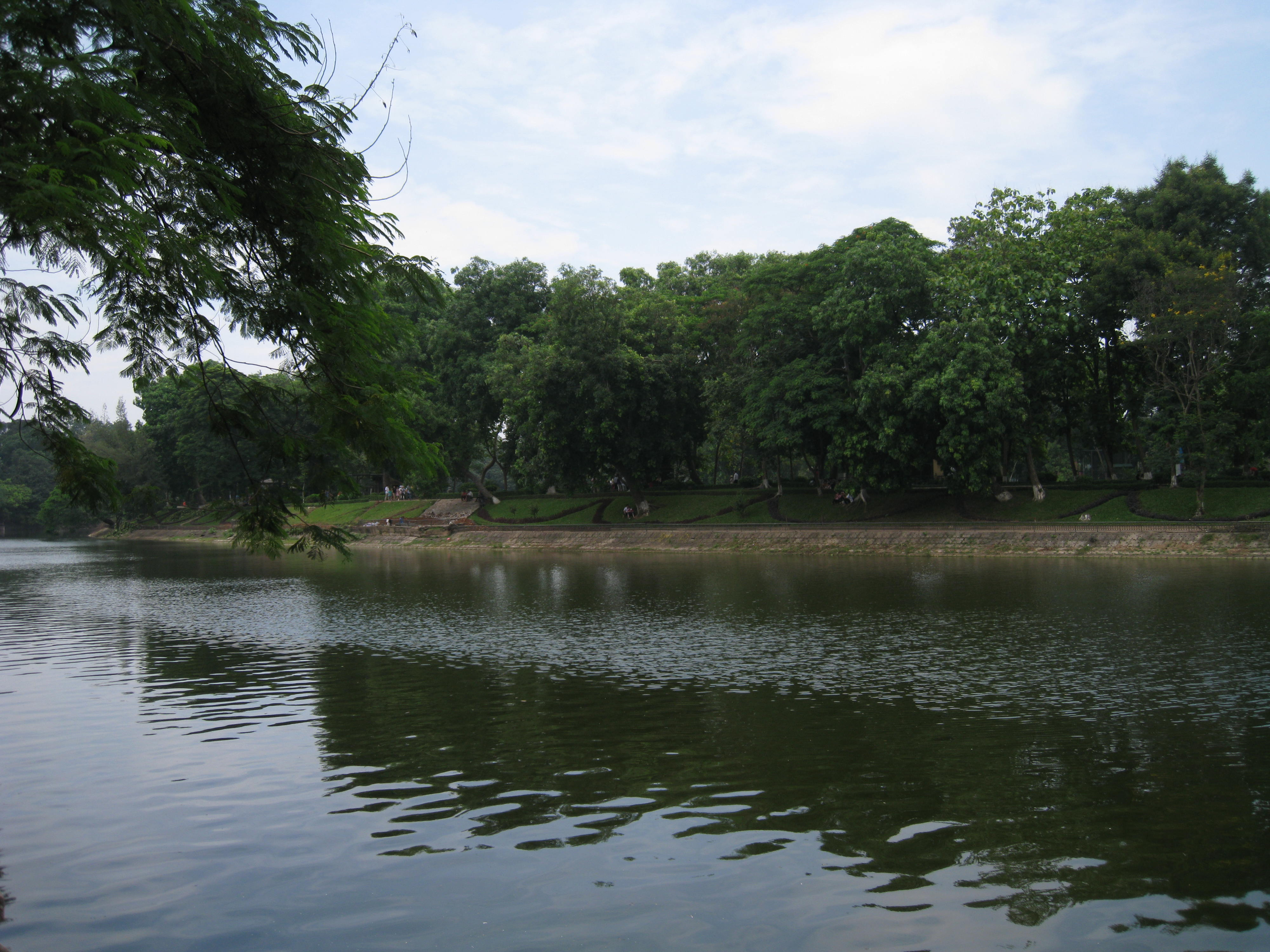
Thủ Lệ lake

=== Bodies of water ===
There are four bodies of water in Giảng Võ, two of which are man-made. The natural bodies of water include Ngọc Khánh and Thủ Lệ. The man-made bodies of water include Giảng Võ and Thành Công. All of which have been affected by eutrophication.

== Etymology ==
The name "Giảng Võ" originates from a temple built in 1010. The temple was built on what is now the modern Giảng Võ area. Giảng Võ also translates to "Teaching Martial Arts", where "Giảng" means to teach and "Võ" means martial arts.

== History ==
=== 2025 administrative reform ===
On June 16, 2025, the National Assembly Standing Committee issued Resolution No. 1656/NQ-UBTVQH15 on the arrangement of commune-level administrative units of Hanoi in 2025.

Giảng Võ was formed by merging the former Giảng Võ ward, most of the natural area and population of Ngọc Khánh and Thành Công ward, along with a part of Cống Vị, Kim Mã, Cát Linh, and Láng Hạ.

== Politics ==
The Chairman of the People's Committee in Giảng Võ is Cồ Như Dũng. The Vice Chairman of the People's Committee is Trần Thị Tố Tâm. The Headquarters of the Giảng Võ Party Committee is located at No. 9 Thành Công Street, and the Headquarters of Giảng Võ People's Committee is located at 525 Kim Mã Street.
