= Văn Miếu – Quốc Tử Giám, Hanoi =

Văn Miếu – Quốc Tử Giám Ward Phường Văn Miếu – Quốc Tử Giám
- Ward (Class-II)
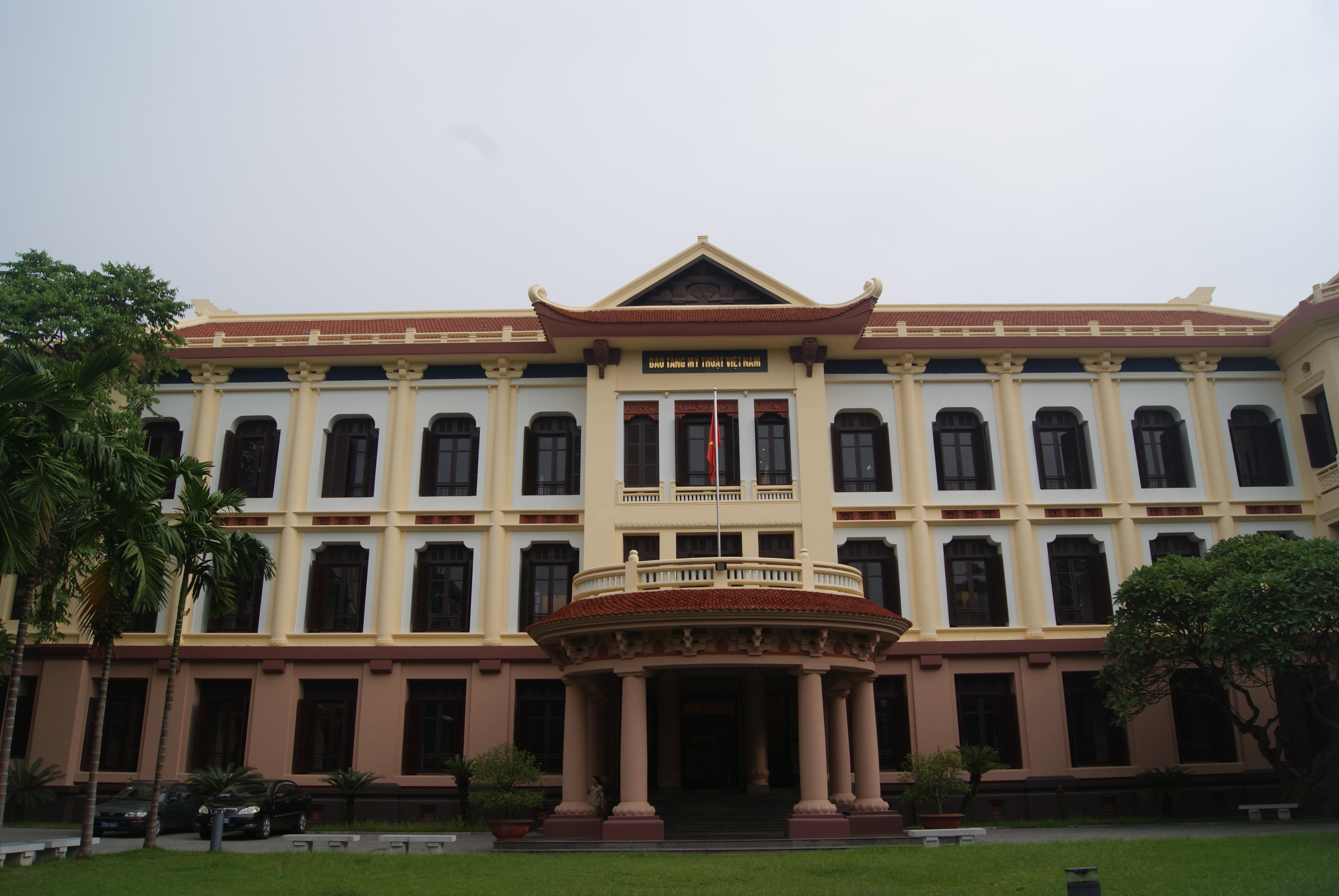
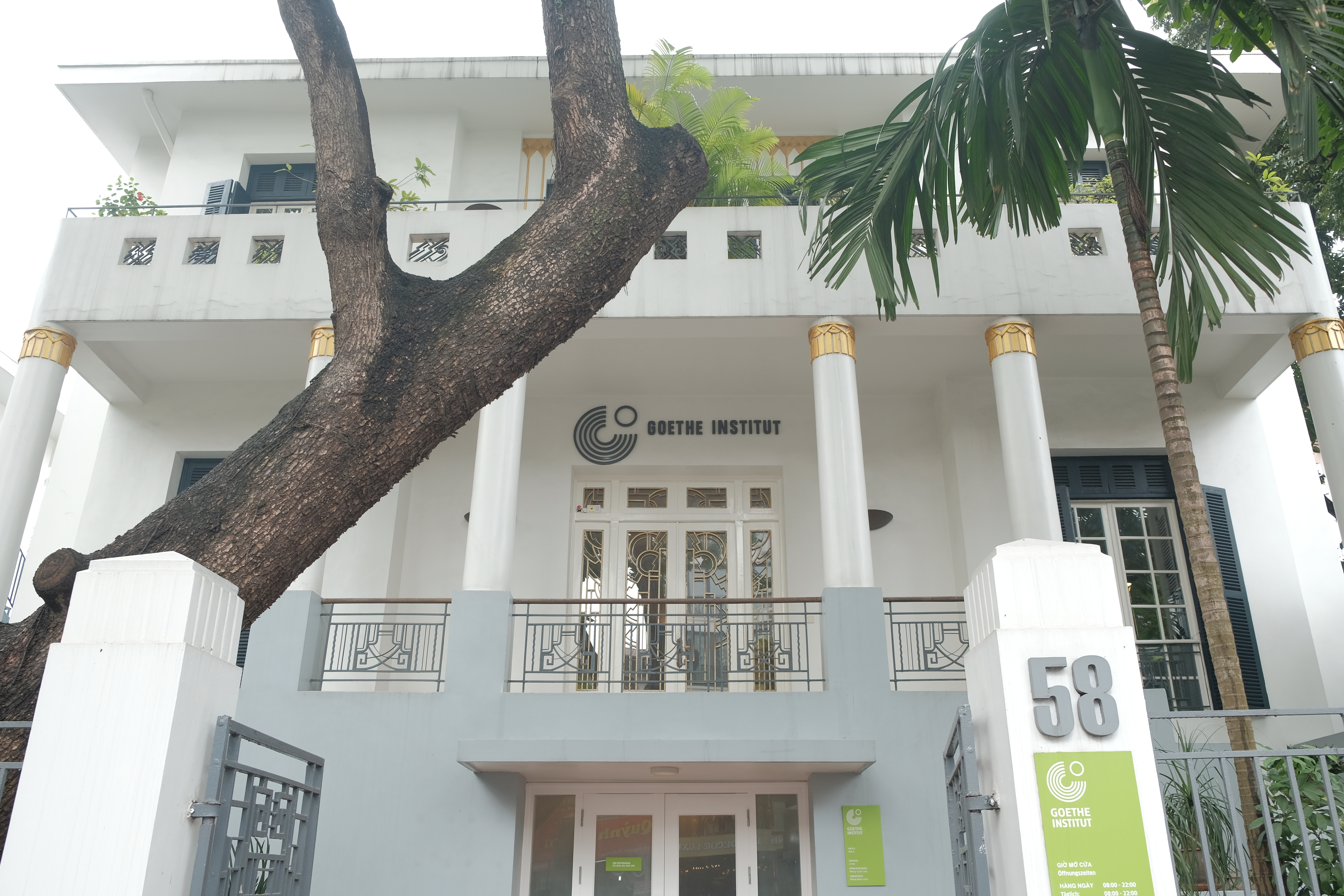
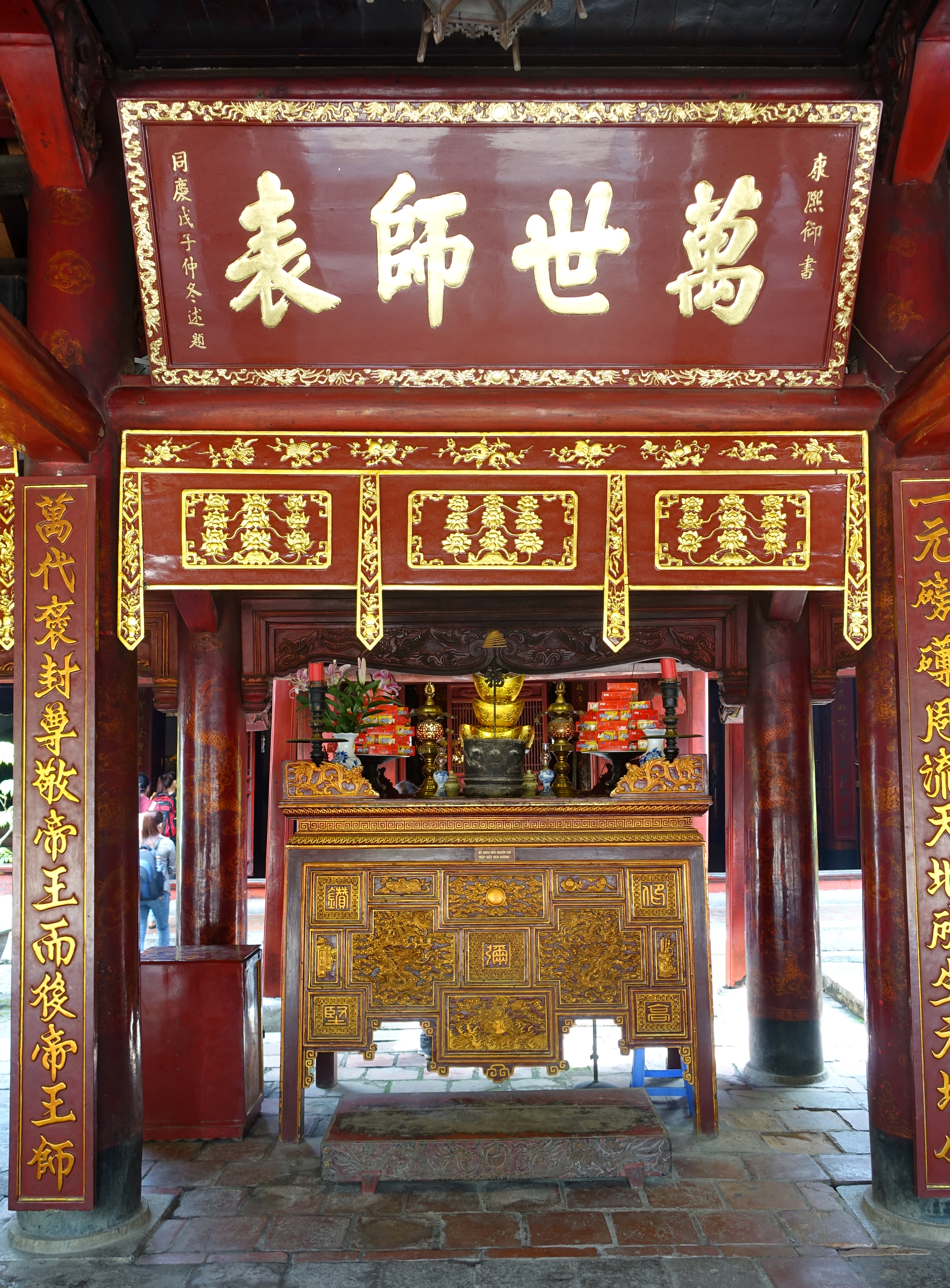
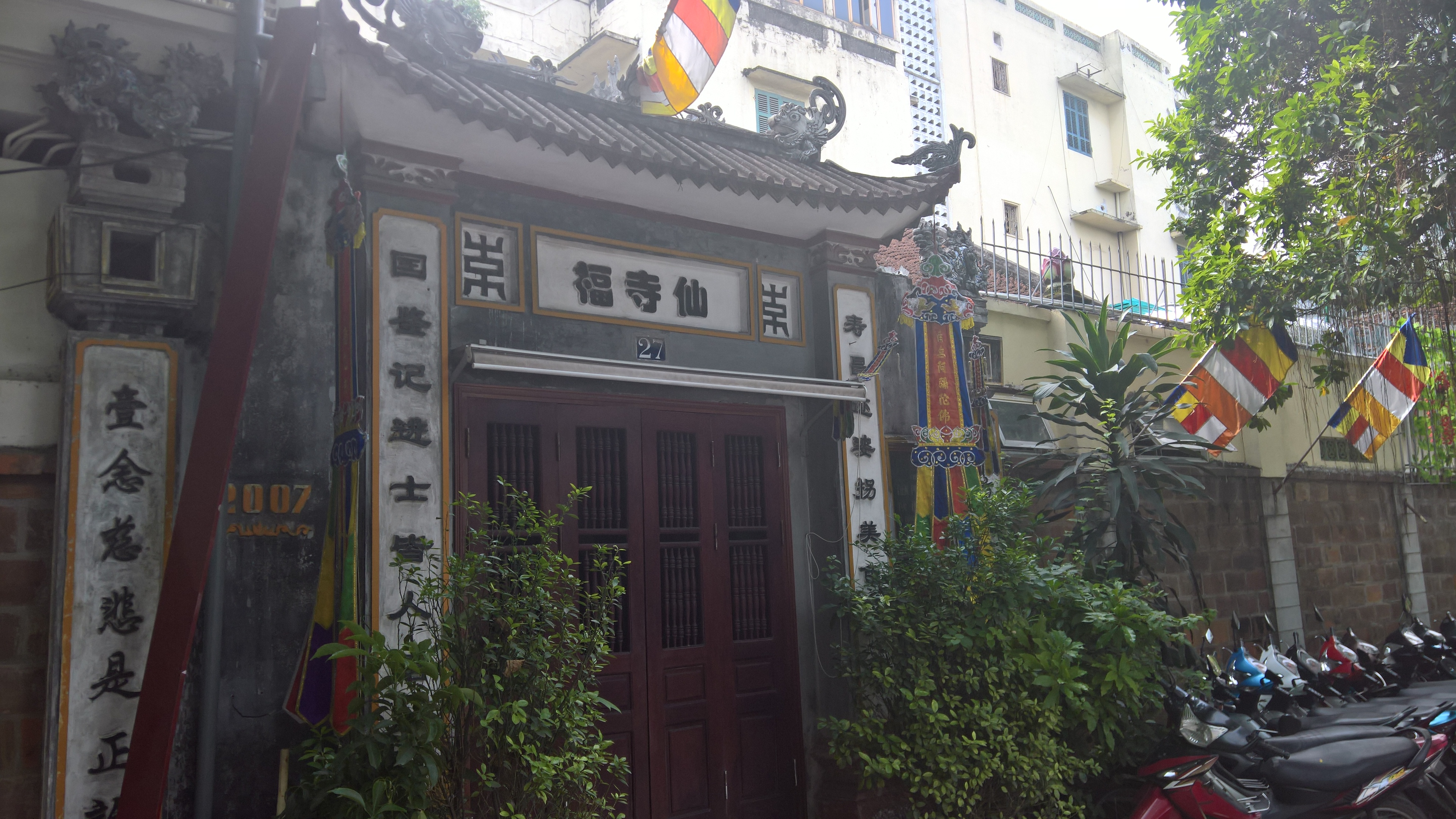
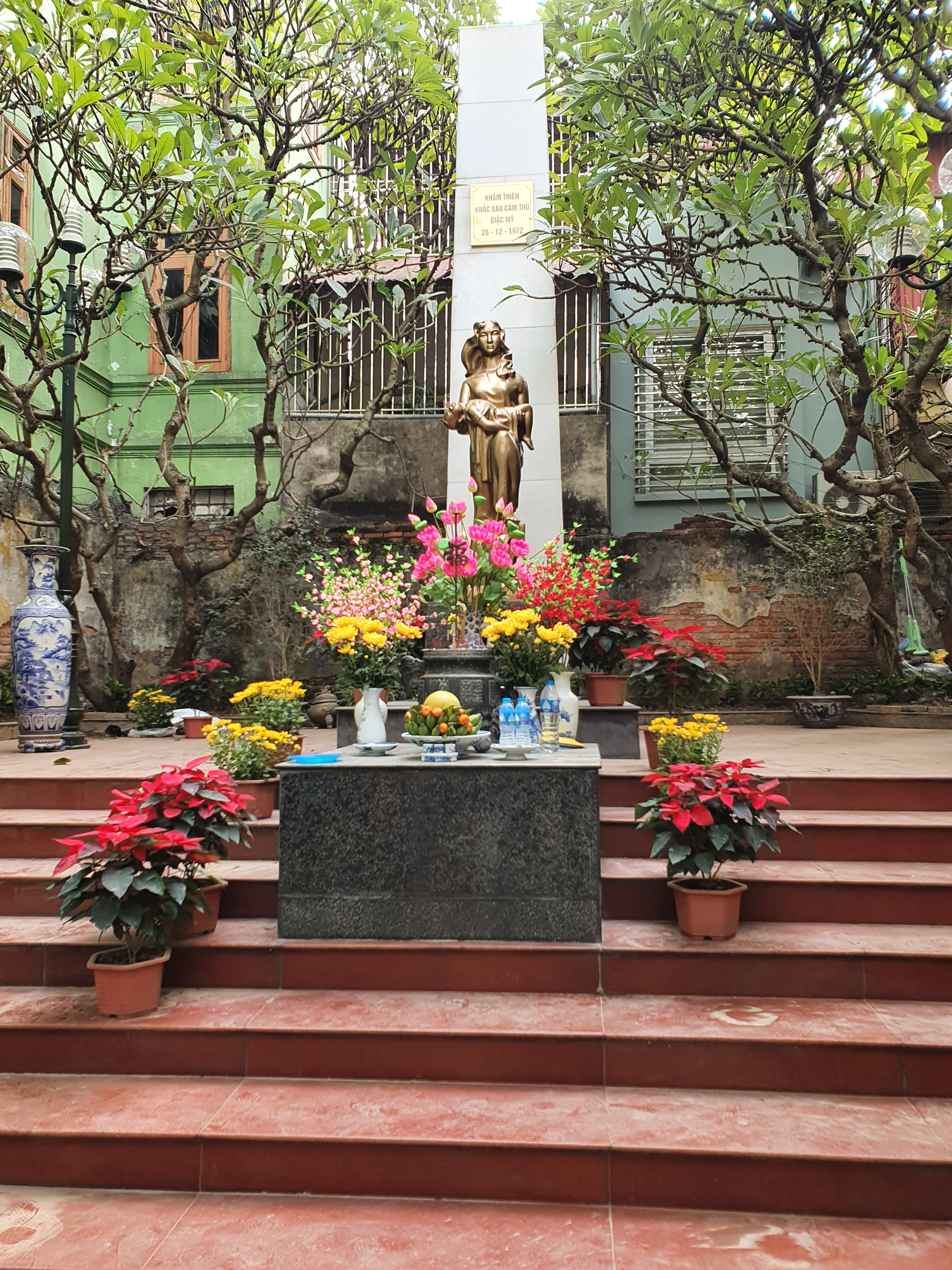
- From top, left to right : Vietnam National Museum of Fine Arts, Goethe-Institut Hanoi, House of Ceremonies at the Temple of Literature, Tiên Phúc Temple, and Khâm Thiên Memorial.
- Interactive map of Văn Miếu – Quốc Tử Giám Ward
- Location within Vietnam
- Country: Vietnam
- Region: Red River Delta
- Municipality: Hà Nội
- Establishment: December 21, 1974 (little zone); June 10, 1981 (urban district); June 16, 2025 (ward)
- Central hall: No.202, Xã Đàn Street, Văn Miếu – Quốc Tử Giám Ward

Government
  - Type: Ward-level authority
  - People Committee's Chairman: Hà Anh Tuấn
  - People Council's chairman: Đỗ Trọng Nam
  - Front Committee's chairman: Mai Văn Lâm
  - Party Committee's Secretary: Đỗ Trọng Nam

Area
  - Total: 1.92 km^{2} (0.74 sq mi)

Population (2025)
  - Total: 75,009
  - Density: 39,100/km^{2} (101,000/sq mi)
  - Ethnicities: Kinh
- Time zone: UTC+7 (Indochina Time)
- ZIP code: 10000–11508 (Note: An official code from December 31, 2023, to present.)
- Climate: Cwa
- Website: vanmieuquoctugiam.hanoi.gov.vn

Văn Miếu – Quốc Tử Giám (Vietnamese pronunciation: [van˧˧ miəw˧˥ kwək˧˥ tɨ̰˧˩˧ zaːm˧˥]) is a ward of Hanoi the capital city in the Red River Delta of Vietnam.

== History ==
Its name phường Văn Miếu – Quốc Tử Giám stems from two historical and cultural relics, lied in the center of the ward and even occupied the largest areas: Văn Miếu (Temple of Literature) and Quốc Tử Giám (National Academy). Meanwhile, the English documents made by the Government of Vietnam and press have all accepted a very popular way of writing as Van Mieu – Quoc Tu Giam ward, or simply VMQTG Ward.

Before the Government of French Indochina undertook a comprehensive redevelopment of the entire area of Hanoi City around 1902, most of the area of modern Văn Miếu – Quốc Tử Giám Ward was within the premises of the Temple of Literature. Some locations have always had guards to preserve the sanctity of the educational environment.

During the first half of the 20th century, it became the southern part of District 1, where a small thermal power plant was built by the French engineers to ensure adequate energy for the middle class.

On December 21, 1974, the Hanoi City People's Committee issued a law on re-dividing its area into little zones (like wards) and quarters (like urban district). (Note: Quyết định về việc thành lập các tiểu khu thuộc các khu phố, thành phố Hà Nội.) Accordingly, the entire area of the Temple of Literature and the residential areas surrounding it have been planned as Văn Miếu and Quốc Tử Giám areas of Đống Đa quarter.

In December 1978, a Decision on the re-organization of these two areas was further issued. (Note: Quyết định về việc sắp xếp lại các tiểu khu thuộc các khu phố, thành phố Hà Nội.)

According to Resolution 1656/NQ-UBTVQH15 of the Standing Committee of the National Assembly of Vietnam on June 16, 2025, after the dissolution of Đống Đa district, the new Văn Miếu – Quốc Tử Giám Ward was established based on the area of some old localities as follows:

- Total area and population of former wards : Khâm Thiên, Thổ Quan, Văn Chương.
- Part of the area and population of the wards : Hàng Bột, Văn Miếu – Quốc Tử Giám (old), Nam Đồng, Phương Liên – Trung Tự from former Đống Đa District, Cửa Nam from Hoàn Kiếm District, Lê Đại Hành and Nguyễn Du from Hai Bà Trưng District, Điện Biên from Ba Đình District.

== See also ==
- Cửa Nam
- Đống Đa
- Láng
- Hai Bà Trưng
- Hoàn Kiếm
- Khương Đình
- Ô Chợ Dừa
- Thanh Xuân
