= Cầu Giấy =

Cầu Giấy Ward Phường Cầu Giấy
- Ward (Class-II)
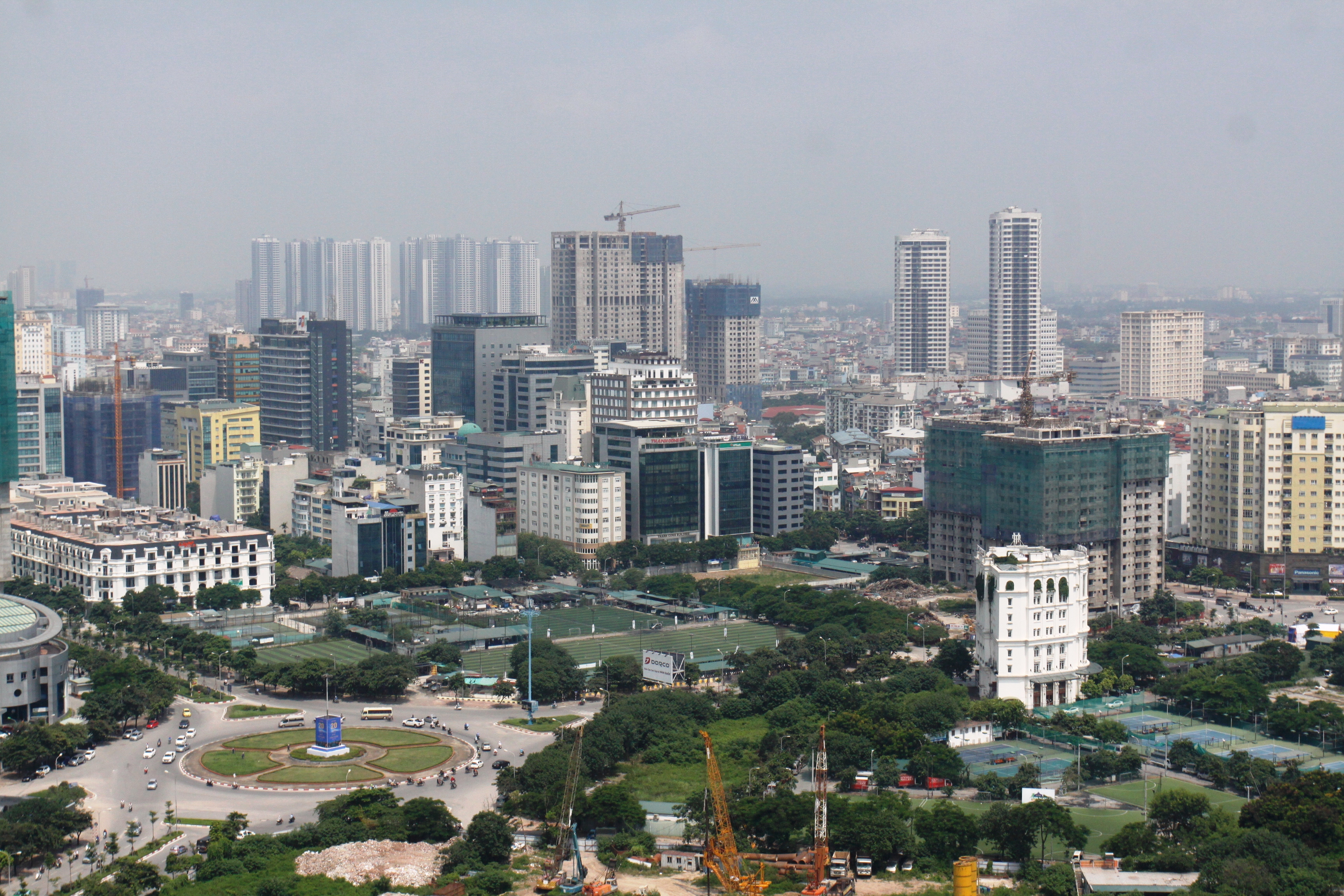
- Panorama from Cầu Giấy Park.
- Nickname: "Làng Cót" (Cót Village)
- Interactive map of Cầu Giấy Ward
- Location within Vietnam
- Coordinates: 21.03°N 105.79°E
- Country: Vietnam
- Region: Red River Delta
- Municipality: Hà Nội
- Establishment: 13 October 1982 (commune); 1 September 1997 (urban district); 19 April 2025 (ward)
- Central hall: No.96, Trần Thái Tông Street, Cầu Giấy Ward

Government
  - Type: Ward-level authority
  - People Committee's Chairman: Nguyễn Quý Hải
  - People Council's Chairman: Chu Bá Định
  - Front Committee's Chairman: Lê Văn Trí
  - Party Committee's Secretary: Nguyễn Minh Hiếu

Area
  - Total: 3.61 km^{2} (1.39 sq mi)

Population (2025)
  - Total: 74,138
  - Density: 20,500/km^{2} (53,200/sq mi)
  - Ethnicities: Kinh

GRDP (2023)
  - Total: 235,920 billion VND; 9.83 billion US$ (Note: Assuming average conversion rate of 24,000 VN$ = 1 USD in 2023)
- Time zone: UTC+7 (Indochina Time)
- ZIP code: 10000–11300 (Note: The official code since 31 December 2023.)
- Climate: Cwa
- Website: caugiay.hanoi.gov.vn

Cầu Giấy is a ward of Hanoi, the capital city in the Red River Delta of Vietnam.

== History ==
On 19 April 2025, to meet the policy to arrange and merge administrative units by the Government of Vietnam, the Hà Nội City People's Committee quickly approved a Resolution on the plan of re-arranging commune-level administrative units in the whole city.

According to the political document published for the press in the same day, the Cầu Giấy district was officially dissolved. Its entire area and demography have been divided into three new wards Cầu Giấy 1 (Cầu Giấy), Cầu Giấy 2 (Nghĩa Đô), and Cầu Giấy 3 (Yên Hòa). Therefore, Cầu Giấy ward (phường Cầu Giấy) has been established by merging the entire former wards Dịch Vọng and Dịch Vọng Hậu and small parts of five former wards Nghĩa Tân, Quan Hoa, Yên Hòa (Cầu Giấy district), and Mỹ Đình 1, Mỹ Đình 2 (Nam Từ Liêm district). This new administrative unit basically has the meaning of preserving the cultural and historical values of before Giấy Hamlet and Hạ Yên Quyết Canton.

== Geography ==
=== Topography ===
Cầu Giấy Ward situates roughly to the West area of urban Hanoi. According to the content of the planning map, what was given to households on 17 April 2025, the administrative unit named Cầu Giấy Ward is located in the South of Nghĩa Đô Ward and the North of Yên Hòa Ward. Its West is Từ Liêm Ward, while its East is adjacent to the Tô Lịch River and connected to the other side of the Trung Hòa Bridge by Láng Ward.

=== Climate ===
Like Hanoi, under the Köppen climate classification Cầu Giấy has a humid subtropical climate (Cfa). There is significant air pollution in Cầu Giấy like other urban districts of Hanoi. A study by Vietnam National University in 2022 determined that most of the air pollution in Cầu Giấy is caused by particulates. Nitrogen oxides, carbon monoxide and sulfur dioxide in the air are also present in significant amount.

== See also ==
- Đống Đa
- Đông Ngạc
- Thanh Xuân
- Từ Liêm
- Yên Hòa
