= Thanh Xuân =

Thanh Xuân Ward Phường Thanh Xuân
- Ward (Class-II)
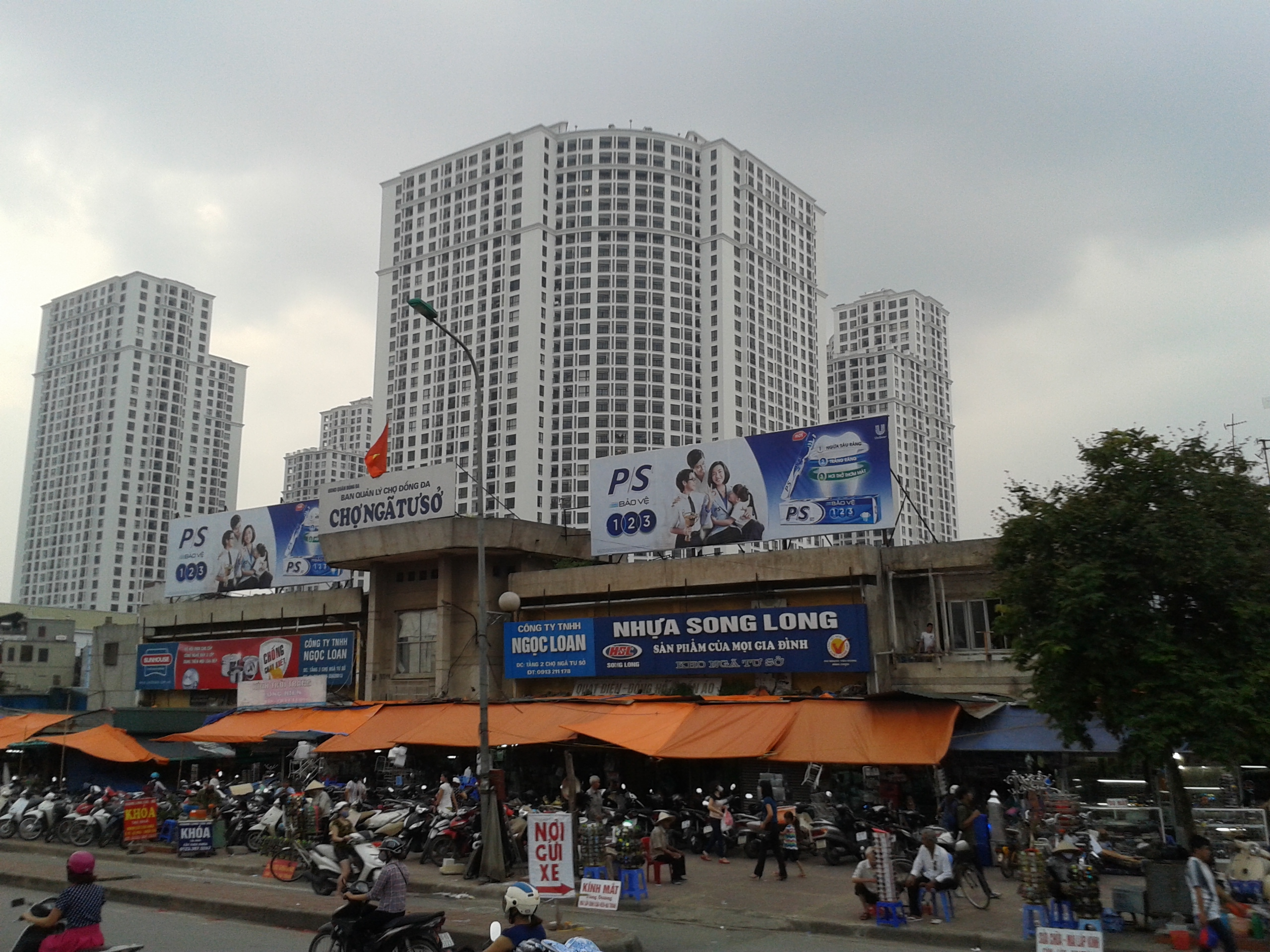
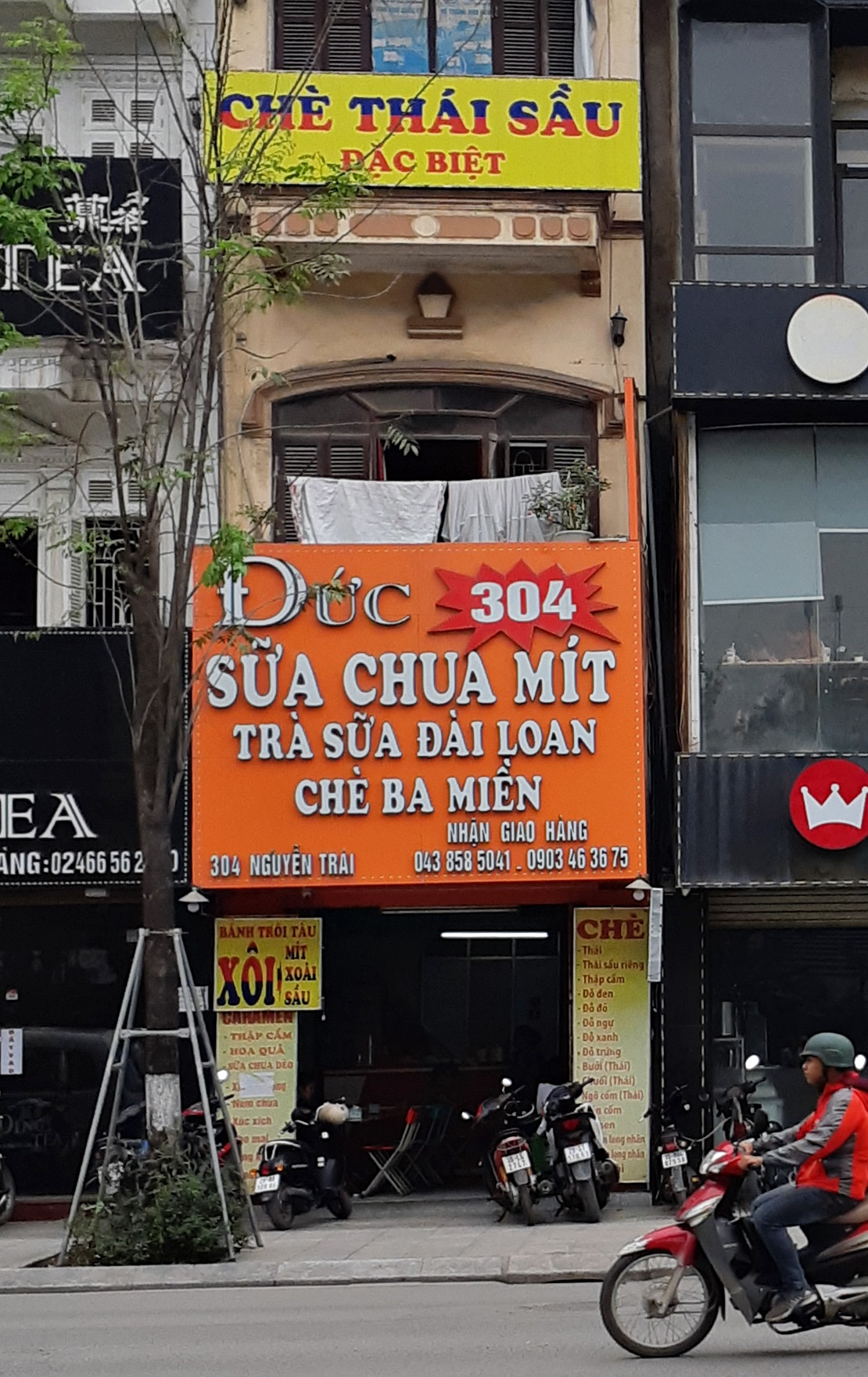
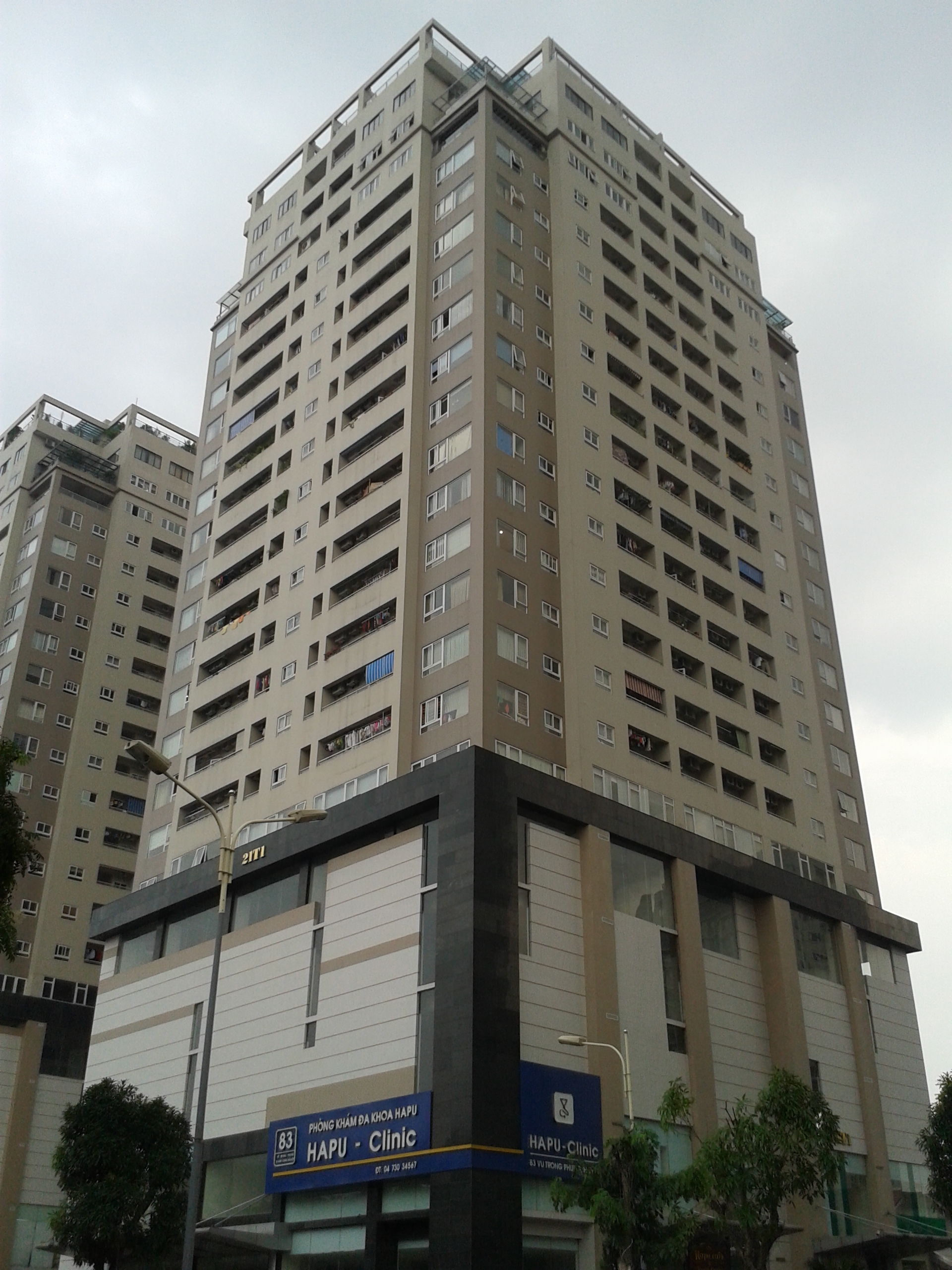
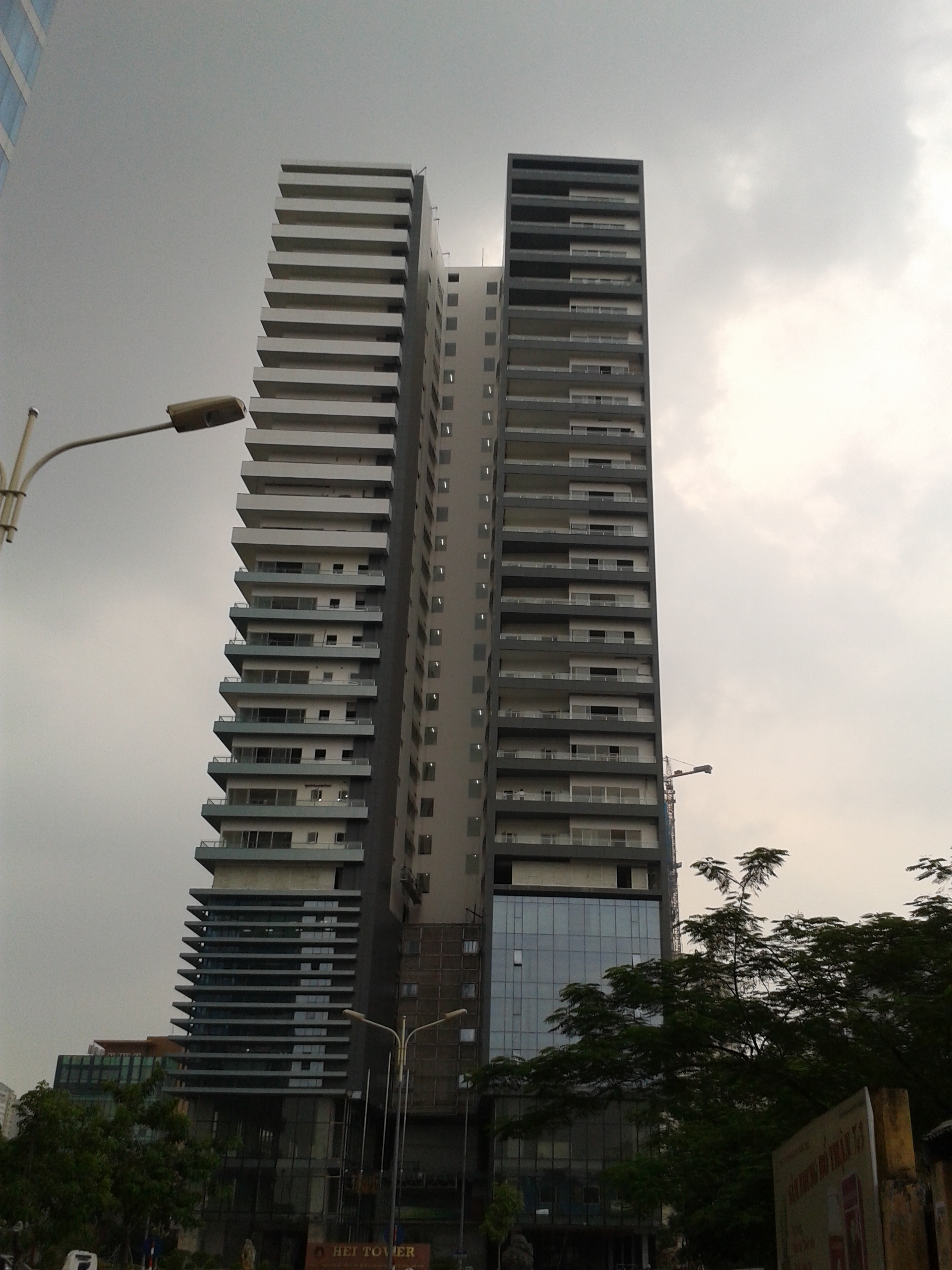
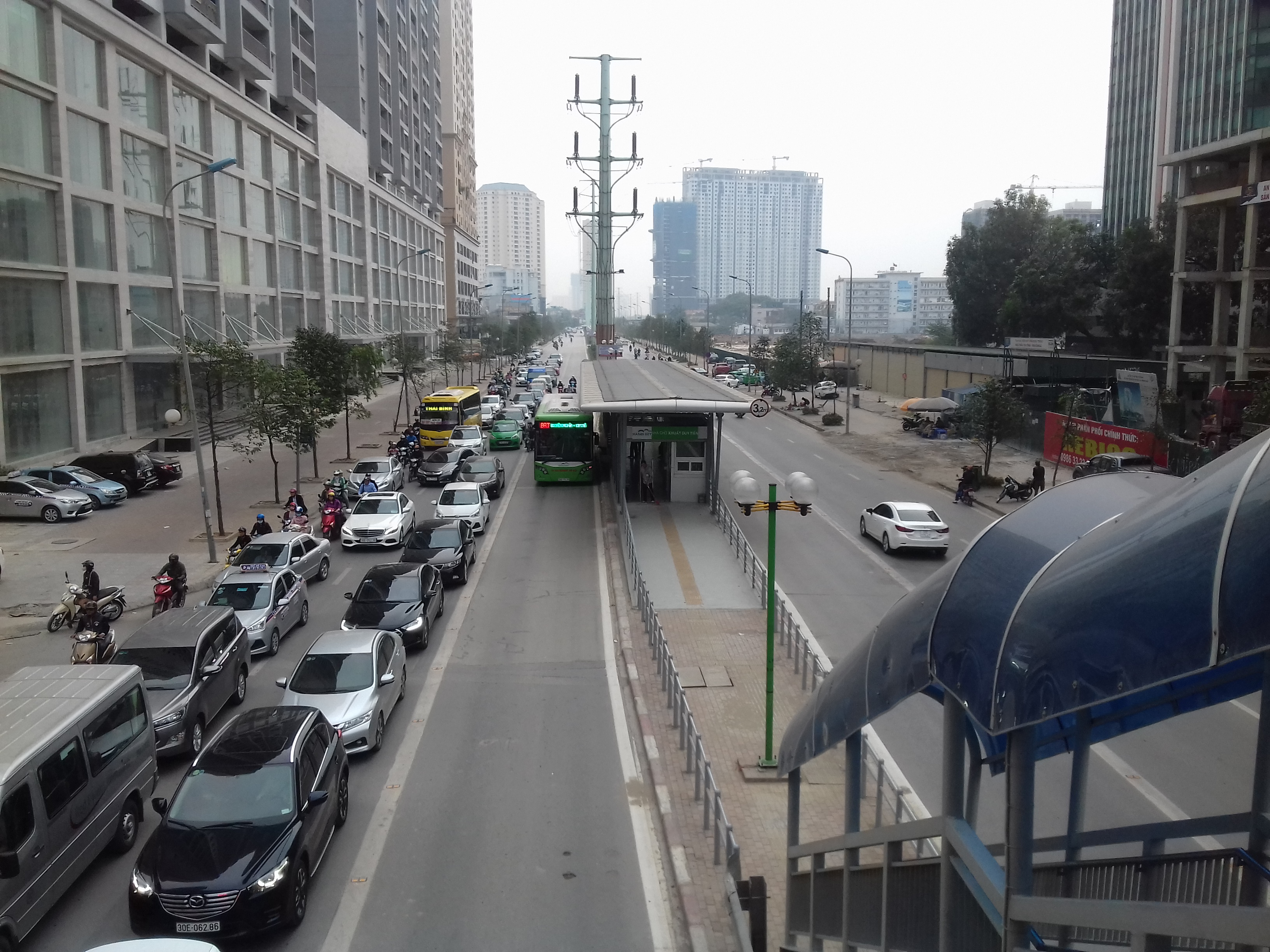
- From top, left to right : Ngã Tư Sở Market, Đức Bubble Tea Shop, Hapulico Complex, Hei Tower, and Hanoi BRT Khuất Duy Tiến.
- Nickname: "Corpse Mound" (Gò Đống Thây)
- Motto: "The future is bright" (Rạng ngời tương lai)
- Country: Vietnam
- Region: Red River Delta
- Municipality: Hà Nội
- Establishment: July 1, 2025 (Note: Từ ngày 1/7/2025, thành phố Hà Nội chính thức đưa vào hoạt động 126 đơn vị hành chính cấp xã, phường mới theo Nghị quyết số 1656/NQ-UBTVQH15 của Ủy ban Thường vụ Quốc hội.) (ward)
- Central hall: No.9, Khuất Duy Tiến Boulevard, Thanh Xuân Ward

Government
  - Type: Ward-level authority
  - People Committee's Chairman: Đỗ Quang Dương
  - People Council's chairman: Bùi Huyền Mai
  - Front Committee's chairman: Nguyễn Xuân Hải
  - Party Committee's Secretary: Bùi Huyền Mai

Area
  - Total: 3.24 km^{2} (1.25 sq mi)

Population (July 1, 2025)
  - Total: 106,316
  - Density: 32,800/km^{2} (85,000/sq mi)
  - Ethnicities: Kinh; Tanka; Others
- Time zone: UTC+7 (Indochina Time)
- ZIP code: 10000–11400 (Note: An official code from December 31, 2023, to present.)
- Climate: Cwa
- Website: Thanhxuan.Hanoi.gov.vn; Thanhxuan.Hanoi.dcs.vn

Thanh Xuân [tʰajŋ˧˧:swən˧˧] is a ward of Hanoi, the capital city in the Red River Delta of Vietnam.

== History ==
Its name Thanh Xuân (Hán Nôm: 青春) was decided by the Hanoi City People's Committee to preserve the cultural, historical, religious and especially political significance of the old administrative unit.

=== Middle Ages ===
When the French had just occupied the Citadel of Hanoi (1883), the area of modern Thanh Xuân Ward belonged to the two largest villages Cự Chính and Quan Nhân. On July 19, 1888, the Tonkin Provisional Government adjusted the boundaries to establish three new villages Cự Lộc, Chính Kinh and Quan Nhân, which belonged to Hoàn Long Rural District, Hà Đông Province.

=== 20th century ===
In 1946, the provisional central government of Vietnam decided to divide the urban Hanoi into zones (Note: "Khu" in Vietnamese, what is equivalent to the following urban-district (quận).). The territory of the three old villages was unified into Thanh Xuân Litte Zone (tiểu khu Thanh Xuân), directly under Đống Đa Zone (khu Đống Đa). Its name was derived from one of the colloquial names of Bồ Đề Pagoda, (Note: Chùa Bồ Đề, đình Cự Chính, gò Đống Thây, phường Thanh Xuân, Hà Nội.) the largest traditional architectural work in the area. The temple was originally built on a site called as Gò Đống Thây (meaning "the mound for corpses" in Vietnamese), which is said to have been a burial place for those who died of famine around the 19th century.

Until 1982, Thanh Xuân Litte Zone was renamed Thanh Xuân Bắc Ward (phường Thanh Xuân Bắc), still belonging to Đống Đa Urban District.

On December 28, 1996, Thanh Xuân Urban District (quận Thanh Xuân) was established on the basis of separating the part across Tô Lịch River of Đống Đa district and merging some more vacant land plots in the north of Hà Đông Town.

=== 21st century ===
On June 16, 2025, in response to Resolution 1656/NQ-UBTVQH15 of the Standing Committee of the National Assembly of Vietnam on the arrangement and merger of administrative units, Thanh Xuân District was officially dissolved. On the basis of the former district, three new wards Khương Đình, Thanh Liệt, and Thanh Xuân were established.

Accordingly, Thanh Xuân Ward (phường Thanh Xuân) was formed based on the structure of administration, area and population from :

- The whole of four Thanh Xuân wards Nhân Chính, Thanh Xuân Bắc, Thanh Xuân Trung, and Thượng Đình.
- The small part of two wards Trung Hòa (Cầu Giấy district) and Trung Văn (Nam Từ Liêm district).

New Thanh Xuân Ward inherits most of the advantages of the former district through the area of former Thanh Xuân Trung Ward, where many administrative, educational, and economic agencies of the Nam Thăng Long area were concentrated.

== Geography ==
=== Climate ===
Climate data for Thanh Xuân Ward
Month	Jan	Feb	Mar	Apr	May	Jun	Jul	Aug	Sep	Oct	Nov	Dec	Year
Record high °C (°F)	33.3 (91.9)	35.1 (95.2)	37.2 (99.0)	41.5 (106.7)	42.8 (109.0)	41.8 (107.2)	40.8 (105.4)	39.7 (103.5)	37.4 (99.3)	36.6 (97.9)	36.0 (96.8)	31.9 (89.4)	42.8 (109.0)
Mean daily maximum °C (°F)	19.8 (67.6)	20.6 (69.1)	23.2 (73.8)	27.7 (81.9)	31.9 (89.4)	33.4 (92.1)	33.4 (92.1)	32.6 (90.7)	31.5 (88.7)	29.2 (84.6)	25.7 (78.3)	22.0 (71.6)	27.6 (81.7)
Daily mean °C (°F)	16.6 (61.9)	17.7 (63.9)	20.3 (68.5)	24.2 (75.6)	27.6 (81.7)	29.3 (84.7)	29.4 (84.9)	28.7 (83.7)	27.7 (81.9)	25.3 (77.5)	21.9 (71.4)	18.3 (64.9)	23.9 (75.0)
Mean daily minimum °C (°F)	14.5 (58.1)	15.8 (60.4)	18.4 (65.1)	21.9 (71.4)	24.8 (76.6)	26.4 (79.5)	26.5 (79.7)	26.1 (79.0)	25.2 (77.4)	22.8 (73.0)	19.3 (66.7)	15.8 (60.4)	21.5 (70.7)
Record low °C (°F)	2.7 (36.9)	5.0 (41.0)	7.0 (44.6)	9.8 (49.6)	15.4 (59.7)	20.0 (68.0)	21.0 (69.8)	20.9 (69.6)	16.1 (61.0)	12.4 (54.3)	6.8 (44.2)	5.1 (41.2)	2.7 (36.9)
Average rainfall mm (inches)	22.5 (0.89)	24.6 (0.97)	47.0 (1.85)	91.8 (3.61)	185.4 (7.30)	253.3 (9.97)	280.1 (11.03)	309.4 (12.18)	228.3 (8.99)	140.7 (5.54)	66.7 (2.63)	20.2 (0.80)	1,670.1 (65.75)
Average rainy days	9.5	11.4	15.9	13.7	14.6	14.8	16.6	16.5	13.2	9.7	6.8	5.2	147.9
Average relative humidity (%)	79.9	82.5	84.5	84.7	81.1	80.0	80.7	82.7	81.0	78.5	77.1	76.2	80.7
Mean monthly sunshine hours	68.7	48.1	45.5	87.4	173.7	167.0	181.1	163.0	162.4	150.3	131.6	113.0	1,488.5
Source 1: Vietnam Institute for Building Science and Technology
Source 2: Extremes (Note: All-time record high; Vietnamnet.vn (May record high and January record low only), Vietnamnet.vn (June record high only), Imh.ac.vn (August record high only), Nchmf.gov.vn, January record high, November record high, April and May record low in The Yearbook of Indochina)

== See also ==
- Đại Mỗ
- Đống Đa
- Khương Đình
- Láng
- Hà Đông
- Hoàng Mai
- Thanh Liệt
- Văn Miếu – Quốc Tử Giám
- Yên Hòa
