= Ba Đình =

Ba Đình Ward Phường Ba Đình
- Ward (Class-II)
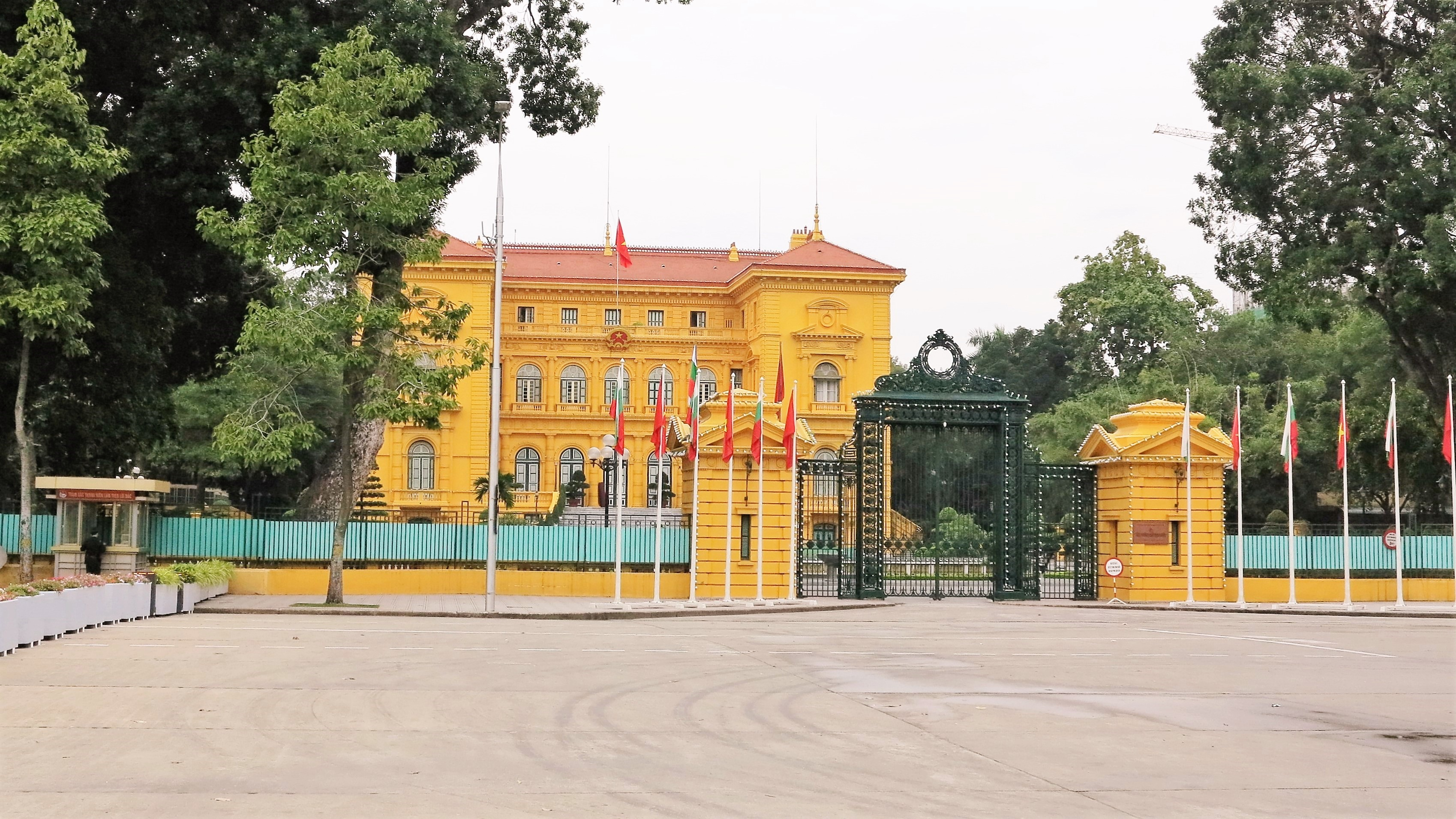
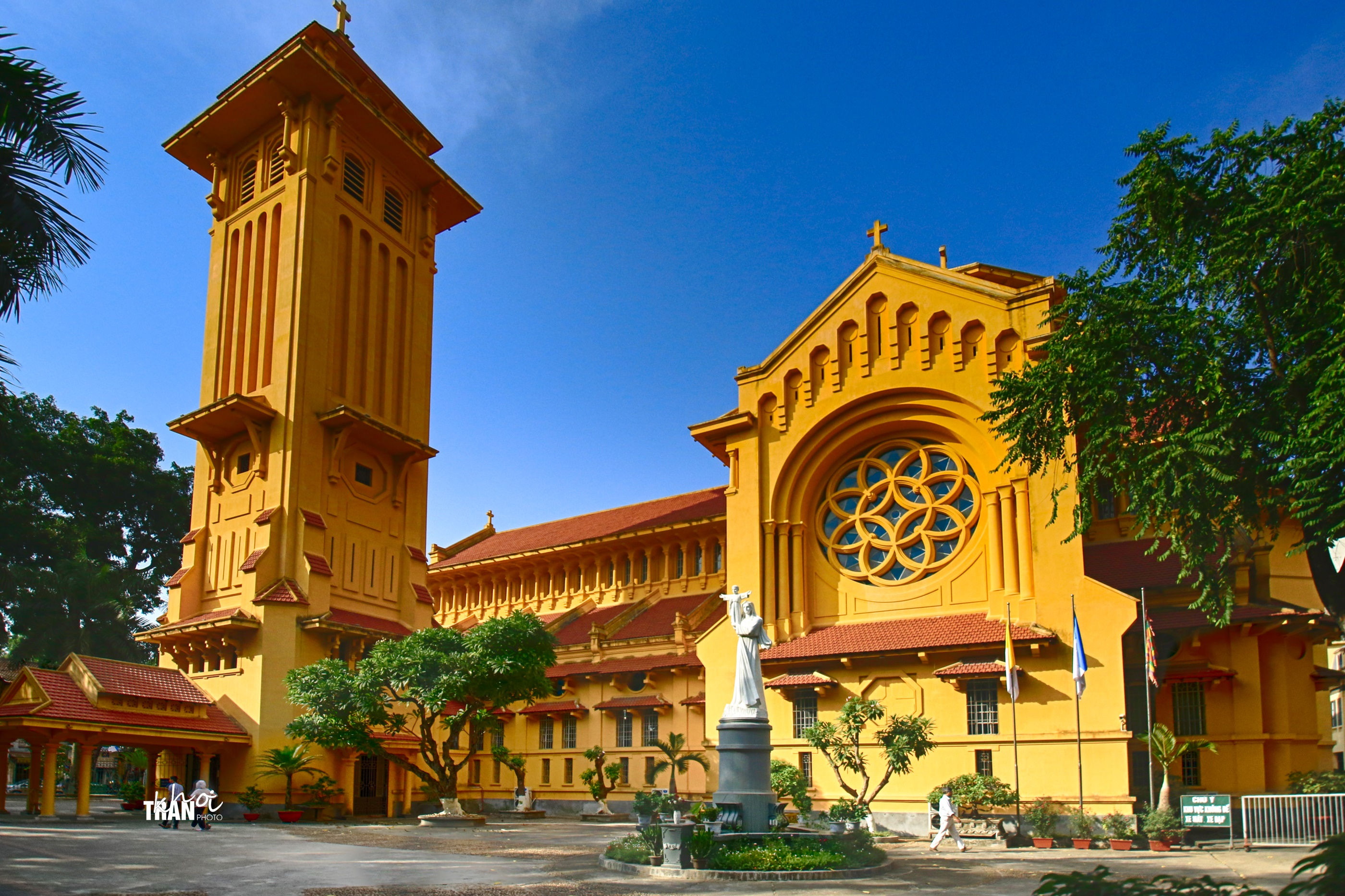
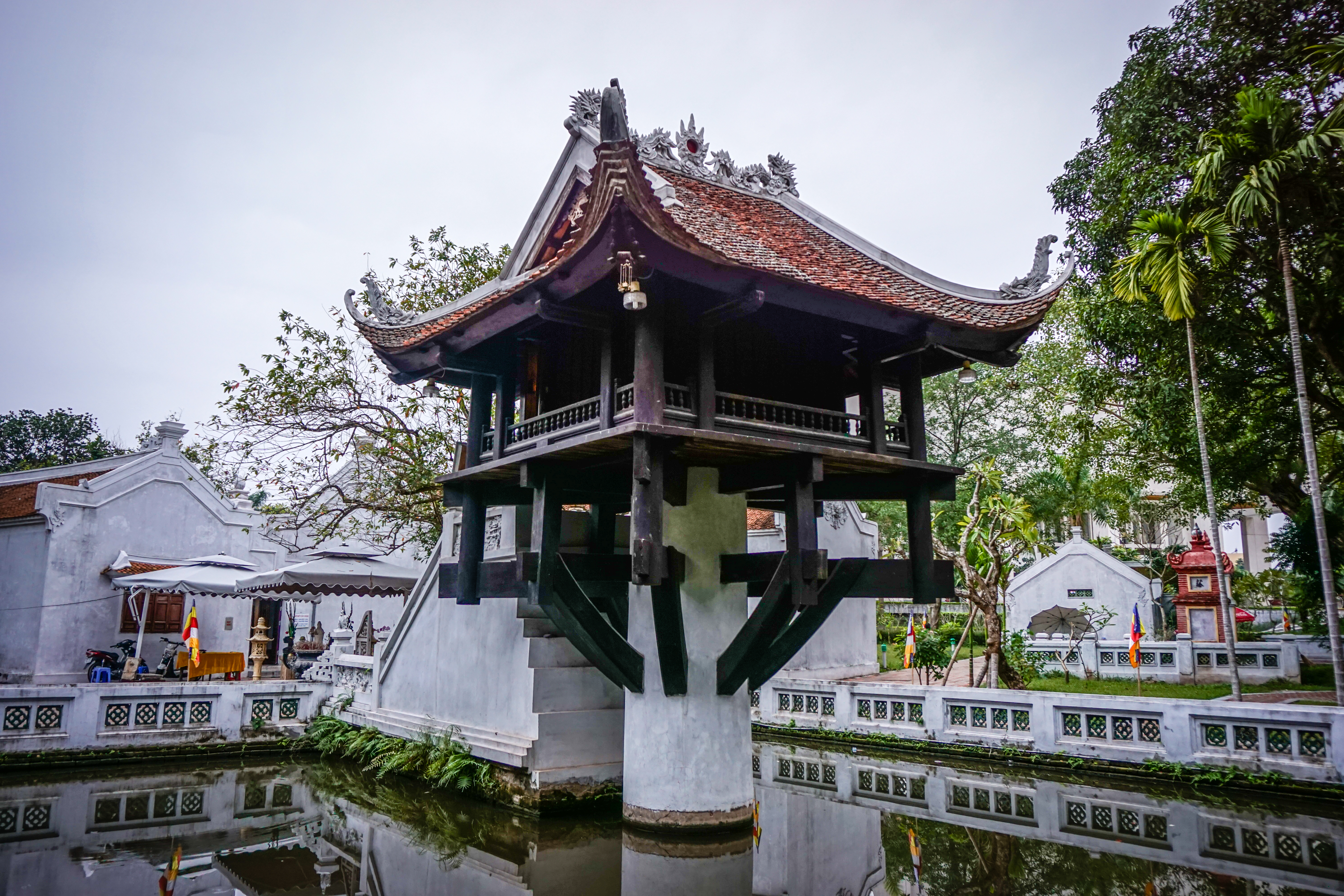
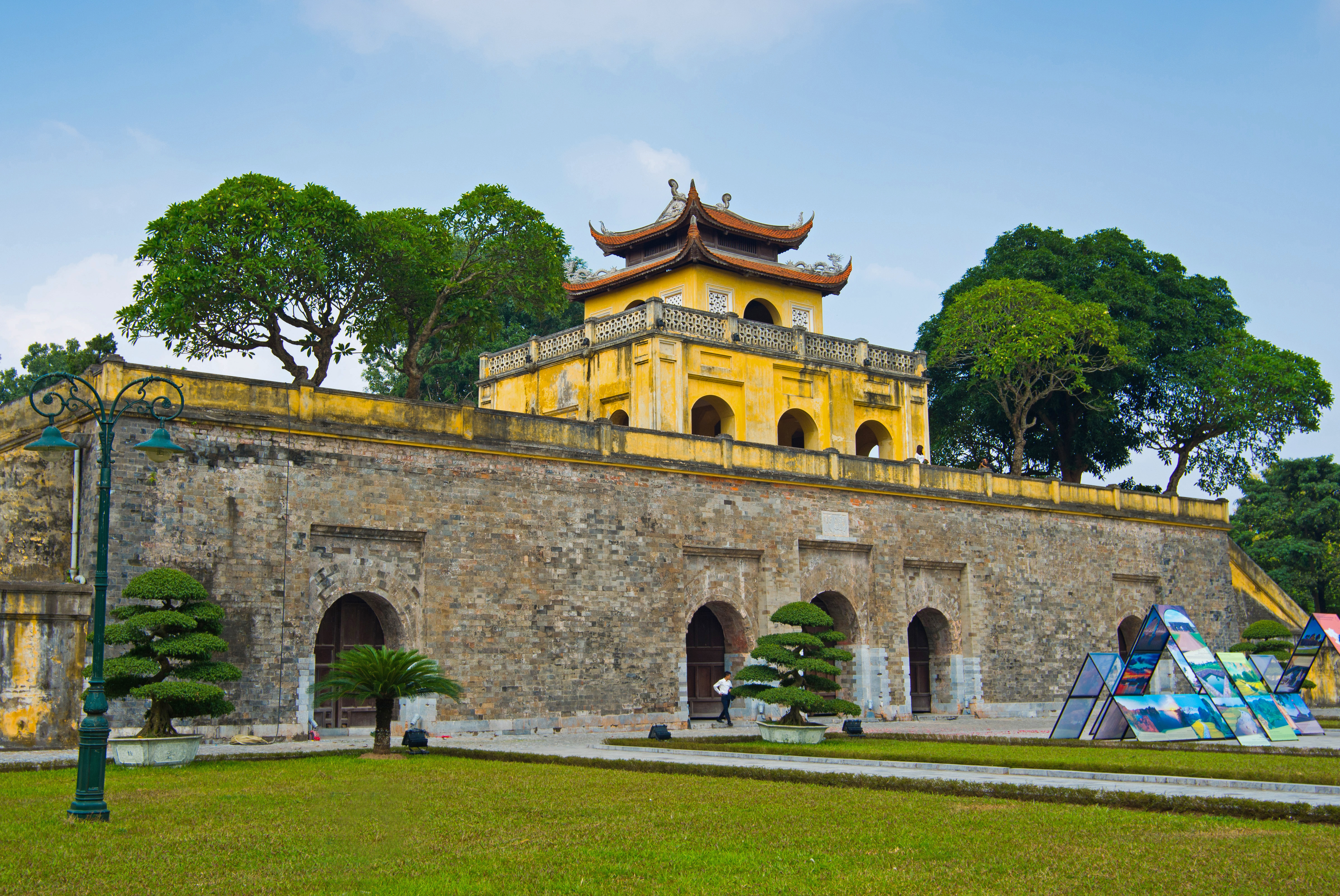
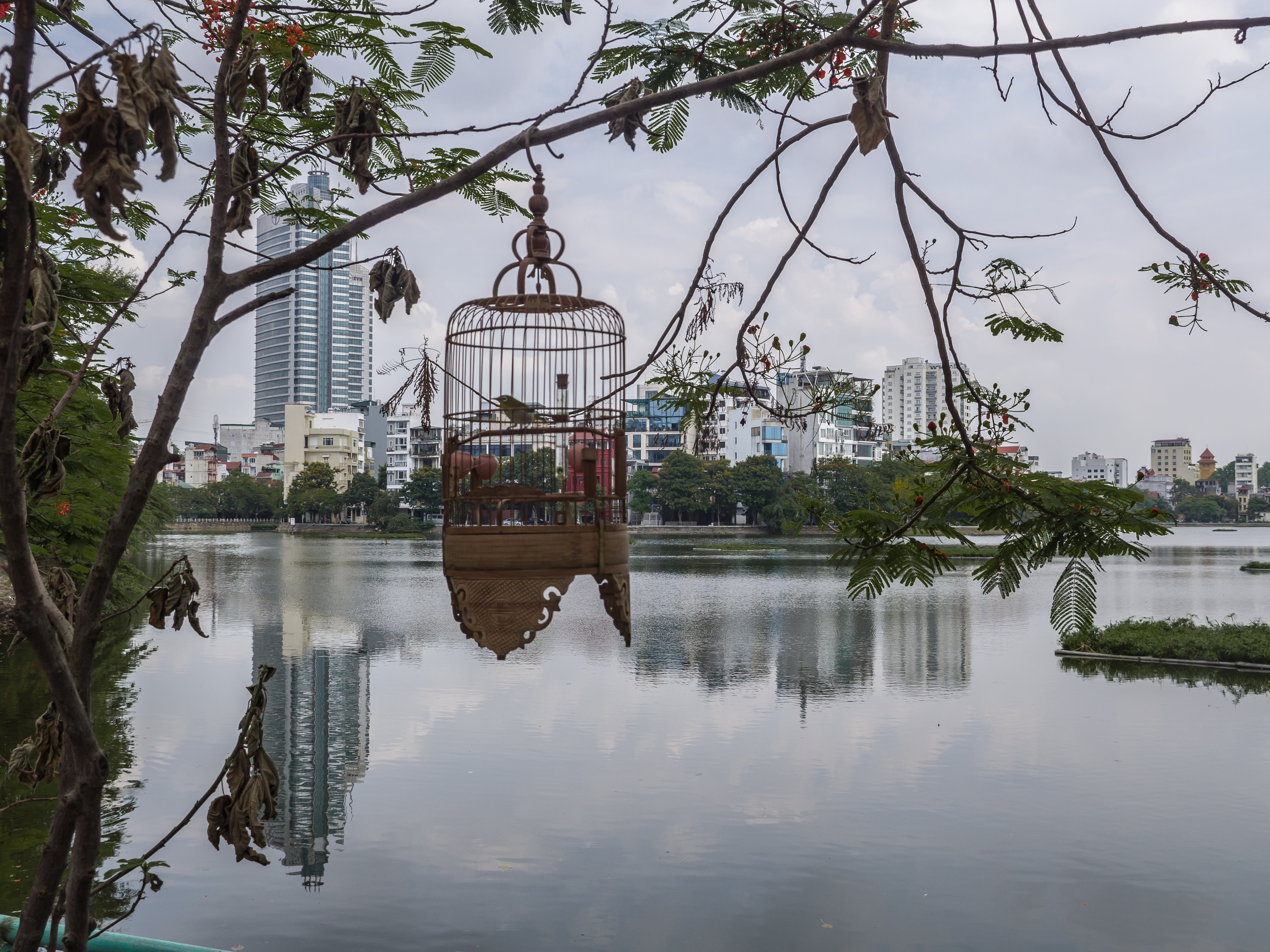
- From top, left to right : Presidential Palace, Church of Our Lady of the Martyrs, Diên Hựu Pagoda, Old Citadel of Hanoi, and Trúc Bạch Lake.

- Seal
- Interactive map of Ba Đình Ward
- Location within Vietnam
- Country: Vietnam
- Region: Red River Delta
- Municipality: Hà Nội
- Establishment: April 29, 2025 (ward)
- Central hall: No.2, Trúc Bạch Street, Ba Đình Ward

Government
  - Type: Ward-level authority
  - People Committee's Chairman: Phạm Thị Diễm
  - People Council's Chairman: Phạm Quang Thanh
  - Front Committee's Chairman: Võ Hồng Vinh
  - Party Committee's Secretary: Phạm Quang Thanh

Area
  - Total: 2.97 km^{2} (1.15 sq mi)

Population (July 1, 2025)
  - Total: 65,023
  - Density: 21,900/km^{2} (56,700/sq mi)
  - Ethnicities: mainly Kinh
- Time zone: UTC+7 (Indochina Time)
- ZIP code: 10000–11100 (Note: An official code from June 6, 2025, to present.)
- Climate: Cwa
- Website: badinh.hanoi.gov.vn

Ba Đình is a ward of Hanoi, the capital municipality in the Red River Delta of Vietnam.

== History ==
The name Ba Đình is borrowed directly from the name of the former district to preserve and promote the cultural values and the history of this administrative unit.

After the entire area of Hà Tây Province was merged into Hanoi on August 1, 2008, along with a number of lands of two provinces Hòa Bình and Vĩnh Phúc, some political agencies of the government of Vietnam have gradually moved to newly established urban districts in the west of the city. This move has been said that in the policy (Note: Quyết định số 130/QÐ-TTg ngày 23/1/2015 về biện pháp, lộ trình di dời và việc sử dụng quỹ đất sau khi di dời cơ sở sản xuất công nghiệp, bệnh viện, cơ sở giáo dục đại học, giáo dục nghề nghiệp và các cơ quan, đơn vị trong nội thành Hà Nội.) of reducing the cause of traffic congestion, and at the same time, facilitating development for poor localities in the west of the capital. According to this project, after the system of agencies has been transferred to another places, the entire Ba Đình District will enter the restoration phase for architectural works that have been degraded for reasons.

On April 29, 2025, to meet the urgent needs of the project for re-organising and merging administrative units by the National Assembly Standing Committee of Vietnam, the Hanoi City People's Council agreed to approve Resolution 19/NQ-HĐND on approving the policy of arranging the commune-level administrative unit of Hanoi City.

== Climate ==
Like Hanoi, under the Köppen climate classification Ba Đình Ward has a humid subtropical climate (Cfa).

Climate data for Ba Đình Ward
Month	Jan	Feb	Mar	Apr	May	Jun	Jul	Aug	Sep	Oct	Nov	Dec	Year
Record high °C (°F)	33.3 (91.9)	35.1 (95.2)	37.2 (99.0)	41.5 (106.7)	42.8 (109.0)	41.8 (107.2)	40.8 (105.4)	39.7 (103.5)	37.4 (99.3)	36.6 (97.9)	36.0 (96.8)	31.9 (89.4)	42.8 (109.0)
Mean daily maximum °C (°F)	19.8 (67.6)	20.6 (69.1)	23.2 (73.8)	27.7 (81.9)	31.9 (89.4)	33.4 (92.1)	33.4 (92.1)	32.6 (90.7)	31.5 (88.7)	29.2 (84.6)	25.7 (78.3)	22.0 (71.6)	27.6 (81.7)
Daily mean °C (°F)	16.6 (61.9)	17.7 (63.9)	20.3 (68.5)	24.2 (75.6)	27.6 (81.7)	29.3 (84.7)	29.4 (84.9)	28.7 (83.7)	27.7 (81.9)	25.3 (77.5)	21.9 (71.4)	18.3 (64.9)	23.9 (75.0)
Mean daily minimum °C (°F)	14.5 (58.1)	15.8 (60.4)	18.4 (65.1)	21.9 (71.4)	24.8 (76.6)	26.4 (79.5)	26.5 (79.7)	26.1 (79.0)	25.2 (77.4)	22.8 (73.0)	19.3 (66.7)	15.8 (60.4)	21.5 (70.7)
Record low °C (°F)	2.7 (36.9)	5.0 (41.0)	7.0 (44.6)	9.8 (49.6)	15.4 (59.7)	20.0 (68.0)	21.0 (69.8)	20.9 (69.6)	16.1 (61.0)	12.4 (54.3)	6.8 (44.2)	5.1 (41.2)	2.7 (36.9)
Average rainfall mm (inches)	22.5 (0.89)	24.6 (0.97)	47.0 (1.85)	91.8 (3.61)	185.4 (7.30)	253.3 (9.97)	280.1 (11.03)	309.4 (12.18)	228.3 (8.99)	140.7 (5.54)	66.7 (2.63)	20.2 (0.80)	1,670.1 (65.75)
Average rainy days	9.5	11.4	15.9	13.7	14.6	14.8	16.6	16.5	13.2	9.7	6.8	5.2	147.9
Average relative humidity (%)	79.9	82.5	84.5	84.7	81.1	80.0	80.7	82.7	81.0	78.5	77.1	76.2	80.7
Mean monthly sunshine hours	68.7	48.1	45.5	87.4	173.7	167.0	181.1	163.0	162.4	150.3	131.6	113.0	1,488.5
Source 1: Vietnam Institute for Building Science and Technology
Source 2: Extremes (Note: All-time record high; VietNamNet.vn (May record high and January record low only), VietNamNet.vn (June record high only), Imh.ac.vn (August record high only), Nchmf.gov.vn, January record high, November record high, April and May record low in The Yearbook of Indochina.)
