= Láng =

Láng Ward Phường Láng
- Ward (Class-II)
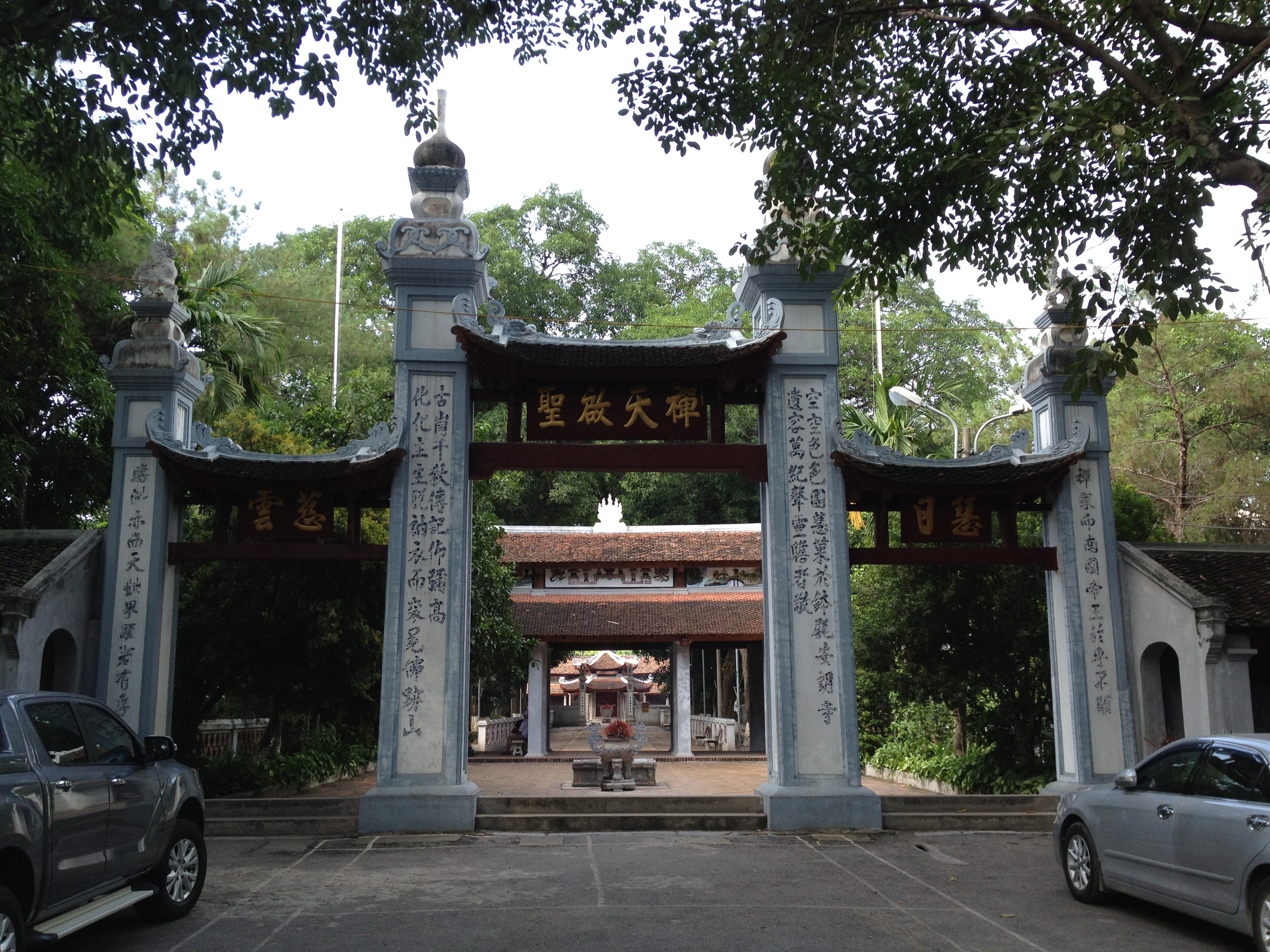
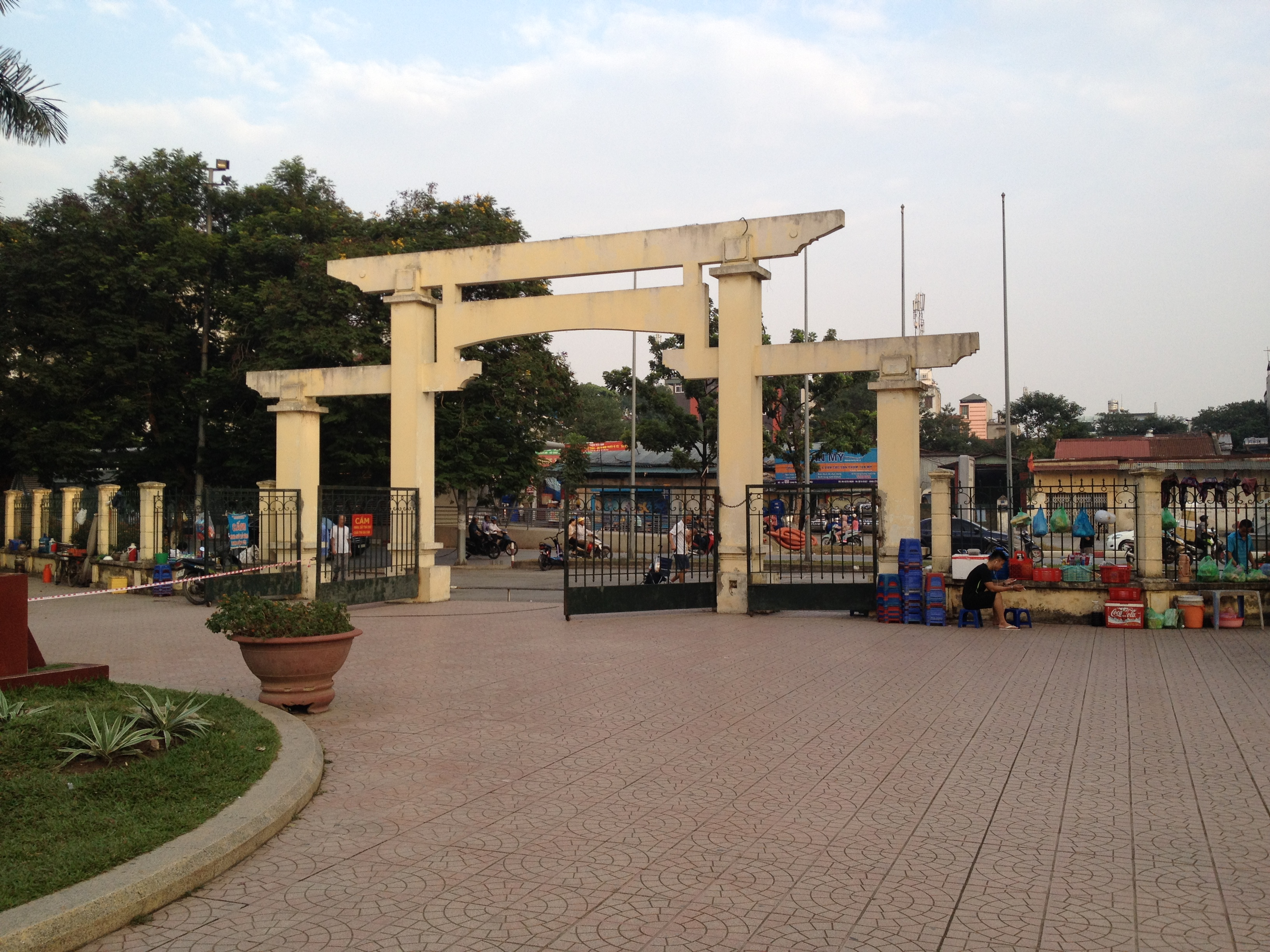
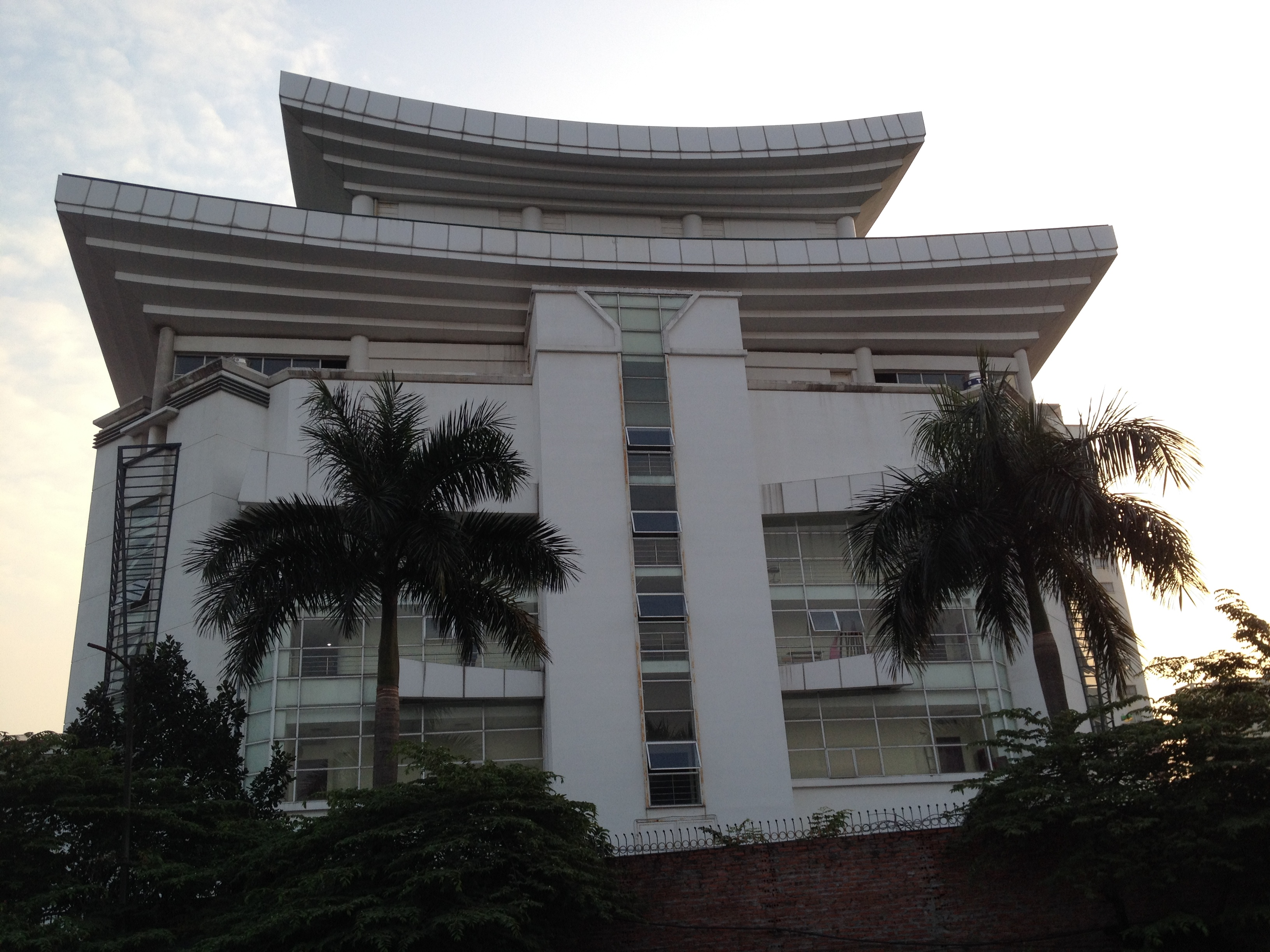
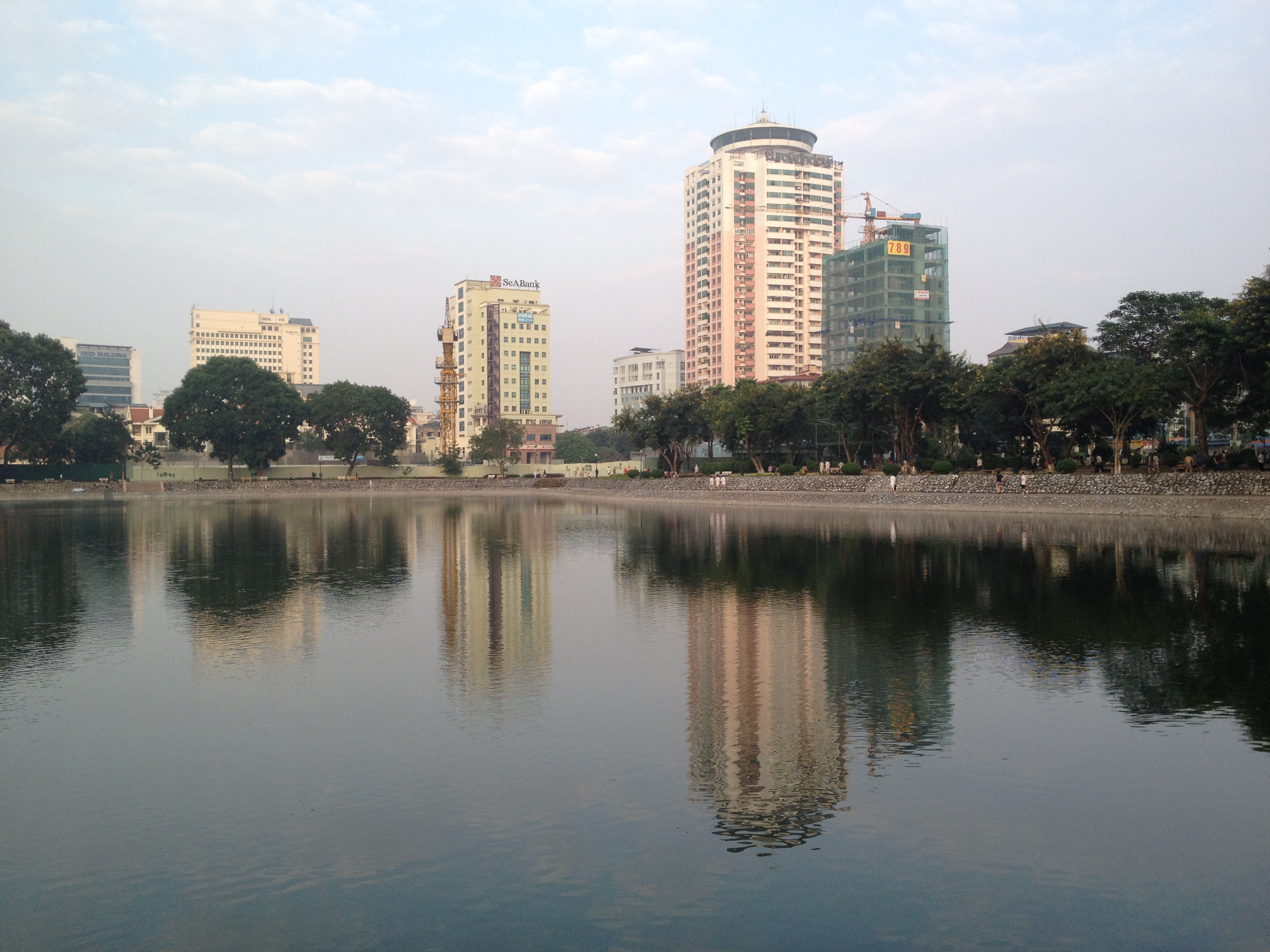
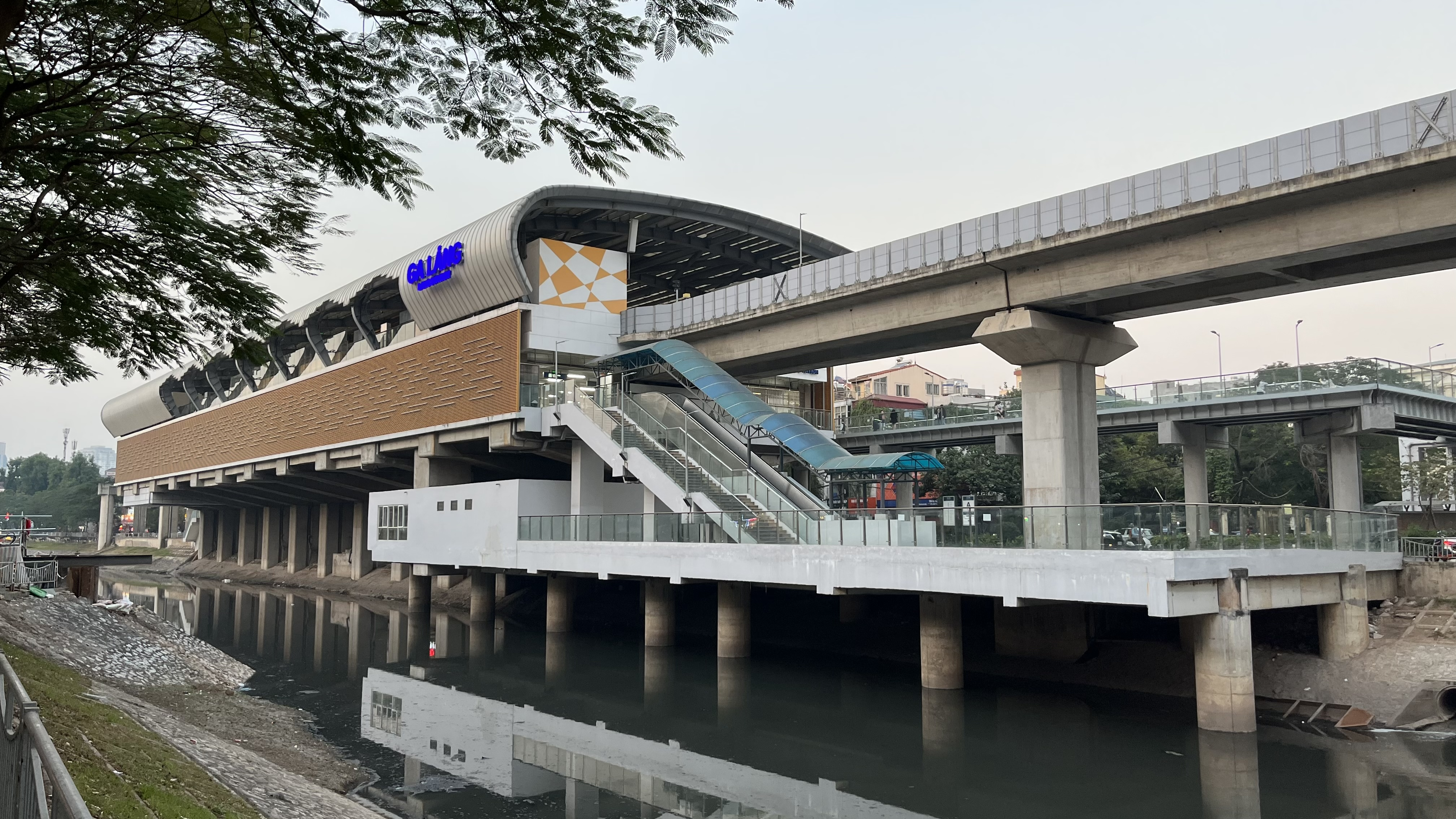
- From top, left to right : Chiêu Thiền Pagoda, Indira Gandhi Park, Âu Cơ Art Center, Thành Công Lake, and Láng Metro Station.
- Interactive map of Láng Ward
- Location within Vietnam
- Coordinates: 21°01′15″N 105°48′18″E
- Country: Vietnam
- Region: Red River Delta
- Municipality: Hà Nội
- Establishment: July 1, 2025 (Note: Từ ngày 1/7/2025, thành phố Hà Nội chính thức đưa vào hoạt động 126 đơn vị hành chính cấp xã, phường mới theo Nghị quyết số 1656/NQ-UBTVQH15 của Ủy ban Thường vụ Quốc hội.) (ward)
- Central hall: No.79A, 25th Alley, Vũ Ngọc Phan Street, Láng Ward

Government
  - Type: Ward-level authority
  - People Committee's Chairman: Nguyễn Thanh Tùng
  - People Council's Chairman: Nguyễn Hồng Dân
  - Front Committee's Chairman: Nguyễn Thị Thanh Yên
  - Party Committee's Secretary: Nguyễn Hồng Dân

Area
  - Total: 1.88 km^{2} (0.73 sq mi)

Population (July 1, 2025)
  - Total: 61,135
  - Density: 32,500/km^{2} (84,200/sq mi)
  - Ethnicities: Kinh; Tanka; Others
- Time zone: UTC+07:00 (Indochina Time)
- ZIP code: 10000–11512 (Note: An official code from December 31, 2023, to present.)
- Climate: Cwa
- Website: Lang.Hanoi.gov.vn; Lang.Hanoi.dcs.vn

Láng [laːŋ˧˥] is a ward of Hanoi, the capital city of Vietnam, in the Red River Delta .

== History ==
According to Đại Việt sử ký toàn thư, Emperor Thần Võ issued an edict around 1070 to build Ứng Thiên Temple at the bank of Tô Lịch River, to worship a saint called Linh Lang Prince. Accordingly, "linh lang" means "miracle wave" in the Middle-age Annamese language. Both the name and time are considered by the people of Hanoi as the starting landmark for the entire history of Láng Ward.

=== Middle Ages ===
At the time when the French Far East Expeditionary Corps (CEFEO) had just completed the conquest of Tonkin (1883), the area of modern ward is a small village called Yên Lãng, (Note: Meaning the peaceful wave in Hanese.) or a continuous way as Kẻ Láng. (Note: K'lang in Middle-age Annamese language.) The village was located on the left bank of the Tô Lịch, which has always belonged to Yên Lãng Commune (xã Yên Lãng), Vĩnh Thuận Rural District, Hoài Đức Canton, Hà Nội Province of the Imperial Annam. Yên Lãng included three hamlets : Láng Thượng, Láng Trung, and Láng Hạ. (Note: "Giáp Thượng, giáp Trung, giáp Hạ" : Meaning the Upper, Middle, and Lower hamlets.)

=== 20th century ===
During the first administrative reform of the Government of French Tonkin (1900–02), the entire area of Hoài Đức Canton was transferred to Hà Đông Province. Therefore, Yên Lãng automatically became the boundary between Hà Nội City and Hà Đông Province. By 1940, the Government of French Indochina has licensed the Tonkin Infantry Regiment to build a barracks called Láng Fortress (pháo đài Láng) to defend the southwestern part of urban Hanoi. (Note: Năm 1940, thực dân Pháp cắm 5 mẫu ruộng ở Láng Trung để lập pháo đài để cùng với các pháo đài Xuân Tảo ở Xuân Đỉnh, Xuân Canh ở Đông Anh, Thổ Khối ở Gia Lâm bảo vệ Hà Nội.)

When the Second Government of the Imperial Vietnam has just established (June 12, 1945), Yên Lãng Commune was dissolved to form a number of Hanoian wards. They have created the southern part of District 1 and the western one of Đống Đa District. Specifically : Ngọc Khánh of Dist. 1, Núi Trúc and Yên Lãng of Đống Đa.

At 20 o'clock (Note: 20:03 in reality. To wait for Yên Phụ Power Plant cutting the entire electricity.) on December 19, 1946, the cannon from Láng Fortress firing into Sofitel Legend Metropole Hanoi became the command to open the Resistance War of the entire Vietnamese nation. However, immediately after the French Forces re-captured the Tonkin Palace in late December, Viet Minh guerrilla groups were forced to withdraw to the southern neighborhoods, where the population density was more crowded. (Note: Nguyễn Huy Tưởng, Sống mãi với thủ đô (Living Forever With the Capital), Văn Học Publishing, Hanoi, 1961.) That led to the formation of the "Trúc–Lãng special zone" (đặc khu Trúc–Lãng), which marked the establishment of the Capital Regiment (Note: "Trung đoàn Thủ đô" : Now the 308th Infantry Division of the People's Army of Vietnam.), the first formal unit of the National Defense Army.

When the government of the Democratic Republic of Vietnam was re-established (1955), Yên Lãng was split into two new wards Láng Thượng and Láng Hạ, both in Đống Đa Urban District.

=== 21st century ===
According to Project 369/ĐA-CP of the Government of Vietnam dated May 9, and Resolution 1656/NQ-UBTVQH15 of the National Assembly Standing Committee dated June 16, 2025, on the re-arrangement of ward-level administrative units in Hanoi, Láng Ward (phường Láng) has been officially established on the basis of the area and demography from parts of some urban districts, which has just been dissolved by the plan for re-organising and merging administrative units. Specifically:

- Whole of the former Láng Thượng Ward
- Most of the former Láng Hạ Ward
- Small part of the former Ngọc Khánh Ward

Its name Láng has been determined by the Hanoi City People's Committee to avoid confusion with Yên Lãng Commune which has a longer origin and also more cultural meanings, belonging to the rural Hanoi.

== Culture ==
=== Architecture ===
Láng area is known by the relic cluster related to Linh Lang Prince (or called Water Spirit), including : Temple of White Horse, (Láng Thượng Street), Cảm Ứng Temple and Linh Lang Garden (Láng Trung Lane), Ứng Thiên Temple (Láng Hạ Street).

According to local records, around the Lê dynasty (Later Lê Dynasty) or 15th century, the competition of old and new beliefs took place. Therefore, Vô Vi Temple was built in Middle Hamlet (now Láng Trung Lane) to worship a Tai-origin saint called "Prince of Highland" (Cao Sơn đại vương, or called Mountain Spirit). However, by the 17th century when the Annamese Daoism was very decline, the temple system in this area was basically moving to worship Buddha, and then a saint called Mother Earth (Ứng Thiên Hậu Thổ phu nhân).

According to the unproven records of the Vietnam Buddhist Sangha, in the area of Láng Thượng Street, there are three pagodas that were built under the reign of Emperor Lý Thần Tông, or early 12th century, to worship Royal Monk Từ Đạo Hạnh. Specifically: Đản Thánh Cơ Pagoda for his parents Từ Vinh and Tằng Thị Loan, Cổ Sơn Pagoda for his elder sister Từ Thị Lan, even Chiêu Thiền Pagoda and Vĩnh Giai Temple for Lý Thần Tông's nurse Từ Thần Anh (a relative of Monk). However, Hanese characters on stone steles and copper bells at these addresses only proved that they were actually built during a period from 1740 to 1756. This was originally a temple system of Mother Goddess, which was banned by the Nguyễn dynasty, thus gradually faded and became pagodas. The group of characters only existed in local legends without any specific documents before the 20th century. Chiêu Thiền Pagoda, in Chùa Láng Street, was home to the first feature film of Vietnamese cinema, Kim Vân Kiều, which was shot in 1923. In addition, this architectural work has also appeared in a number of short documentaries by French filmmakers.

In addition, Láng Fortress is considered to the most important war relic of the capital Hanoi. The largest ones inside are four 7.5 cm Pak 40 cannons, which served from 1940 to 1975. On December 16, 1946, Grand General Võ Nguyên Giáp secretly arrived at this location to urge the preparation for the historic campaign of Viêt-Minh Forces. By the 19th, the four cannons have simultaneously opened fire to the beginning of the revolt of the people of the capital. Even on the 22nd, they hit the first Spitfire, which crashed on Hàng Bột Street.

During the Vietnam War, Láng Fortress received some more advanced weapons by the Soviet Union, which was used to defend Hanoian sky from United States aircraft. Until the post-war period, the Fortress did not have much real meanings. Therefore, the Hanoi City People's Committee has used it as a place to display the memorabilia of the First Indochina War, and the later historical things were returned to the Ministry of Defence.

Besides, a small corner of the relic has been used for building Láng Hydrometeorological Station (Trạm khí tượng thủy văn Láng). Currently, this agency has been upgraded to the headquarters of the Department of Hydrometeorology (Cục khí tượng thủy văn).

=== Cuisine ===
From a small record of Đại Việt sử ký toàn thư, Emperor Trần Dụ Tông brought some slaves to Kẻ Láng in 1362 to take advantage of the fertility of Tô Lịch riverbanks to grow garlic, which was essential for royal meals. Over time, it has entered folklore as one of the famous vegetable growing locations. (Note: Dưa La, húng Láng, ngổ Đầm, cá rô đầm Sét, sâm cầm hồ Tây.) Among them, corn mint is the most typical. Therefore, since the beginning of the 20th century until now, Láng Ward has been the place to supply corn mint as a spice for phở restaurants in urban Hanoi.

== Geography ==
=== Demography ===
According to the statistical yearbook of the whole Hanoi, as of 2025 Láng Ward had a population of 61,135. Besides, the population of the whole ward is fully registered as Kinh people.

=== Climate ===
Climate data for Láng Ward
| Month | Jan | Feb | Mar | Apr | May | Jun | Jul | Aug | Sep | Oct | Nov | Dec | Year |
|---|---|---|---|---|---|---|---|---|---|---|---|---|---|
| Record high °C (°F) | 33.3 (91.9) | 35.1 (95.2) | 37.2 (99.0) | 41.5 (106.7) | 42.8 (109.0) | 41.8 (107.2) | 40.8 (105.4) | 39.7 (103.5) | 37.4 (99.3) | 36.6 (97.9) | 36.0 (96.8) | 31.9 (89.4) | 42.8 (109.0) |
| Mean daily maximum °C (°F) | 19.8 (67.6) | 20.6 (69.1) | 23.2 (73.8) | 27.7 (81.9) | 31.9 (89.4) | 33.4 (92.1) | 33.4 (92.1) | 32.6 (90.7) | 31.5 (88.7) | 29.2 (84.6) | 25.7 (78.3) | 22.0 (71.6) | 27.6 (81.7) |
| Daily mean °C (°F) | 16.6 (61.9) | 17.7 (63.9) | 20.3 (68.5) | 24.2 (75.6) | 27.6 (81.7) | 29.3 (84.7) | 29.4 (84.9) | 28.7 (83.7) | 27.7 (81.9) | 25.3 (77.5) | 21.9 (71.4) | 18.3 (64.9) | 23.9 (75.0) |
| Mean daily minimum °C (°F) | 14.5 (58.1) | 15.8 (60.4) | 18.4 (65.1) | 21.9 (71.4) | 24.8 (76.6) | 26.4 (79.5) | 26.5 (79.7) | 26.1 (79.0) | 25.2 (77.4) | 22.8 (73.0) | 19.3 (66.7) | 15.8 (60.4) | 21.5 (70.7) |
| Record low °C (°F) | 2.7 (36.9) | 5.0 (41.0) | 7.0 (44.6) | 9.8 (49.6) | 15.4 (59.7) | 20.0 (68.0) | 21.0 (69.8) | 20.9 (69.6) | 16.1 (61.0) | 12.4 (54.3) | 6.8 (44.2) | 5.1 (41.2) | 2.7 (36.9) |
| Average rainfall mm (inches) | 22.5 (0.89) | 24.6 (0.97) | 47.0 (1.85) | 91.8 (3.61) | 185.4 (7.30) | 253.3 (9.97) | 280.1 (11.03) | 309.4 (12.18) | 228.3 (8.99) | 140.7 (5.54) | 66.7 (2.63) | 20.2 (0.80) | 1,670.1 (65.75) |
| Average rainy days | 9.5 | 11.4 | 15.9 | 13.7 | 14.6 | 14.8 | 16.6 | 16.5 | 13.2 | 9.7 | 6.8 | 5.2 | 147.9 |
| Average relative humidity (%) | 79.9 | 82.5 | 84.5 | 84.7 | 81.1 | 80.0 | 80.7 | 82.7 | 81.0 | 78.5 | 77.1 | 76.2 | 80.7 |
| Mean monthly sunshine hours | 68.7 | 48.1 | 45.5 | 87.4 | 173.7 | 167.0 | 181.1 | 163.0 | 162.4 | 150.3 | 131.6 | 113.0 | 1,488.5 |
Source 1: Vietnam Institute for Building Science and Technology
Source 2: Extremes (Note: All-time record high; Vietnamnet.vn (May record high and January record low only), Vietnamnet.vn (June record high only), Imh.ac.vn (August record high only), Nchmf.gov.vn, January record high, November record high, April and May record low in The Yearbook of Indochina)

== See also ==
- Cầu Giấy
- Nghĩa Đô
- Ngọc Hà
- Ô Chợ Dừa
- Thanh Xuân
- Từ Liêm
- Yên Hòa
