= Đống Đa =

- Ward
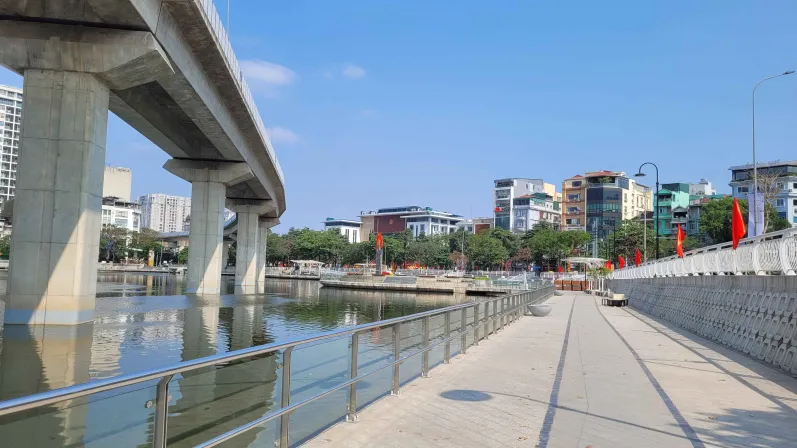
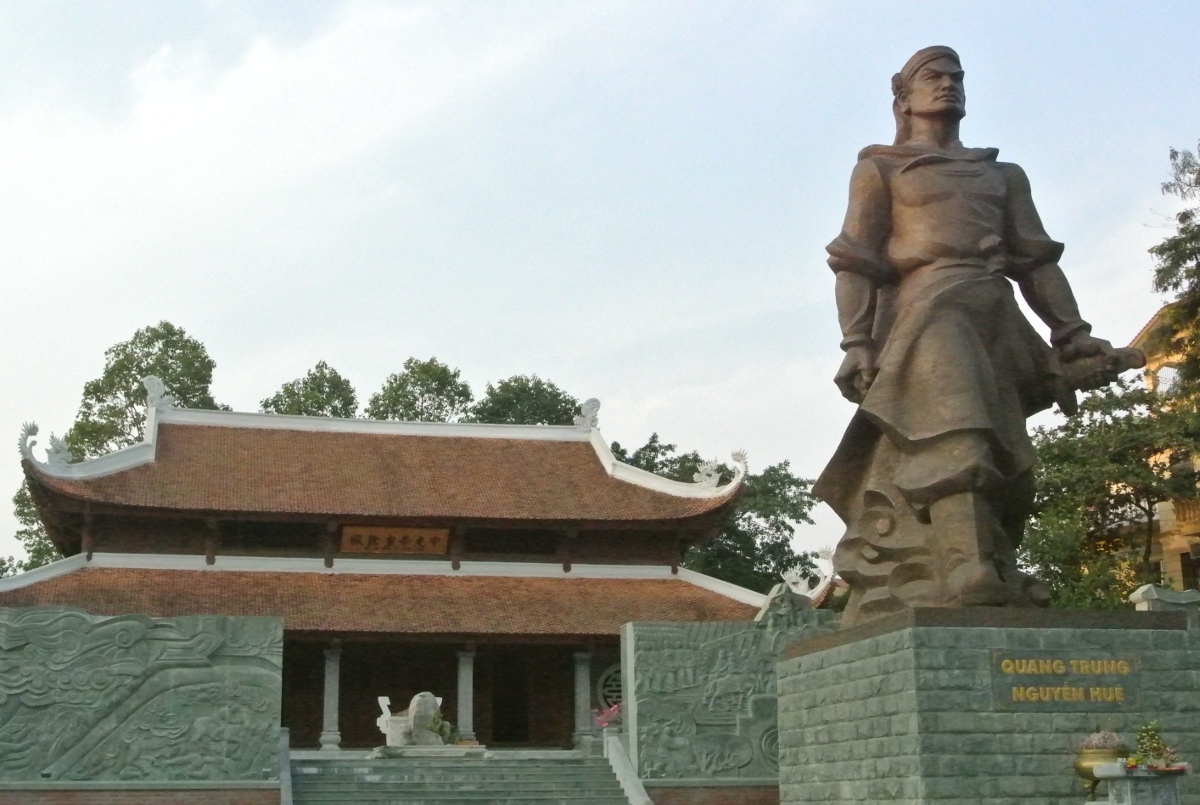
- Hoàng Cầu Lake Tây Sơn Street in Đống Đa Ward Statue of Nguyễn Huệ at Đống Đa Mound
- Interactive map of Đống Đa
- Coordinates: 21.017856709220183°N 105.82491891993277°E
- Country: Vietnam
- Region: Red River Delta
- Municipality: Hanoi
- Administrative headquarters: No. 59 Hoàng Cầu Street

Area
  - Total: 2.07 km^{2} (0.80 sq mi)

Population (2025)
  - Total: 81,358
  - Density: 39,303/km^{2} (101,790/sq mi)
- Website: dongda.hanoi.gov.vn

Đống Đa is a ward in the municipality of Hanoi, Vietnam. The ward inherited its name from the former Đống Đa district.

On 16 June 2025, district-level administrative units nationwide ceased to operate.

On the same date, the Standing Committee of the National Assembly of Vietnam issued Resolution No. 1656/NQ-UBTVQH15 on the arrangement of commune-level administrative units in Hanoi in 2025. Under the resolution, the entire area and population of Thịnh Quang Ward and parts of Quang Trung, Láng Hạ, Nam Đồng, Ô Chợ Dừa, and Trung Liệt wards, formerly part of Đống Đa district, were merged to form a new ward named Đống Đa.
