= List of high schools in Hanoi, Vietnam =

Hanoi is a city with a diverse system of high schools; including public schools, private schools, specialized schools and schools with foreign elements. Hanoi University was home to the country's first business school.

== Specialized high schools ==
There are currently 9 specialized high schools in Hanoi.

School's name	Founded year	Location	Note
High School for Gifted Students, Hanoi National University of Education	1966	136 Xuan Thuy, Cau Giay District	Formerly the High School for Computer and Mathematics of Hanoi National University of Education. Other name: Specialized Education High School
Hanoi - Amsterdam High School for the Gifted	1985	No. 1, Hoang Minh Giam Street, Cau Giay District	
Nguyen Hue High School for the Gifted	03/1947	560B Quang Trung Street, La Khe, Ha Dong	
High School specializing in Foreign Languages	1969	Km 2, Pham Van Dong street Cau Giay	
High School specializing in Natural Sciences	1965	182 Luong The Vinh Street, Thanh Xuan District	
High School for Gifted Students in Social Sciences and Humanities	2019	số 336 Nguyen Trai Street, Thanh Xuan District	
Chu Van An High School	1908	No. 10 Thuy Khue street, Thuy Khue ward, Tay Ho district	
Son Tay High School	1959	No. 45, Den Va Street, Trung Hung Ward, Son Tay	
High School of Science Education	2016	Base 1: House G4, 144 Xuan Thuy, Cau Giay Facility 2:Kieu Mai Street, Phuc Dien Ward, Bac Tu Liem	

== Public high schools ==
This is a type of school invested by the State, Central or Local level in economic investment. Non-business expenses and facilities operate mainly from public funding. That is, public financial sources or nonprofit contributions.

School's name	Founded year	Address	Website/ Note
Ba Dinh District
Phan Dinh Phung High School	10/3/1973	67 Cua Bac Street, Quan Thanh Ward, Ba Dinh District	
Pham Hong Thai High School	1976	No. 1, Nguyen Van Ngoc Street, Ba Dinh District	
Nguyen Trai High School	24/8/1950	No. 50 Nam Cao, Ba Dinh	
Tay Ho District
Tay Ho High School	07/2002	No. 143 Phu Thuong Street, Phu Thuong, Tay Ho District	
Chu Van An High School	1908	No. 10 Thuy Khue street, Thuy Khue ward, Tay Ho district	The school has specialized classes.
Hoan Kiem District
Tran Phu High School	01/11/1960	No. 8 Hai Ba Trung Street, Hoan Kiem District	
Viet Duc High School	1955	47 Ly Thuong Kiet Street, Hoan Kiem	
Hai Ba Trung District
Thang Long High School	1920 (Forerunner of school) 1965 (Official establishment)	No. 44 - Ta Quang Buu - Hai Ba Trung	
Tran Nhan Tong High School	1960	15 Huong Vien St., Dong Nhan Ward, Hai Ba Trung District	
Doan Ket High School	1960	No. 174 Hong Mai, Hai Ba Trung district	
Dong Da District
Kim Lien High School	1974	No. 1, Lane 4C - Dang Van Ngu Street - Dong Da District	
Dong Da High School	1960	10 Quan Tho alley 1, Ton Duc Thang street, Dong Da district	
Quang Trung High School	1970	178 Lang street - Dong Da district	
Le Quy Don High School	1945	195 alley Xa Dan 2, Nam Dong, Dong Da district	
Thanh Xuan District
Nhan Chinh High School	24/07/2002	No. 01 Nguy Nhu Kon Tum Street - Nhan Chinh Ward - Thanh Xuan District	
Tran Hung Dao High School	10/10/1993	Ngõ 477 Nguyễn Trãi, Thanh Xuân Nam, Thanh Xuân	This is the first public high school in Thanh Xuan district.
Khuong Dinh High School	06/07/2020	Alley 78/29 Khuong Ha, Khuong Dinh, Thanh Xuan District	
Cau Giay District
Cau Giay High School	27/4/2007	Nguyen Khanh Toan new urban area - Cau Giay	
Yen Hoa High School	1960	Alley 251, Nguyen Khang, Yen Hoa Ward, Cau Giay District	
Hoang Mai District
Vietnam - Poland High school	26/3/1960	No. 1, Lane 48 Ngoc Hoi, Hoang Liet, Hoang Mai	It is the first high school in Hoang Mai - Thanh Tri area.
Truong Dinh High School	1973	Alley 166, Tan Mai Street, Tan Mai, Hoang Mai	
Hoang Van Thu High School	25/09/1966	234 Linh Nam, Hoang Mai	
Ha Dong District
Le Quy Don High School	14/12/1970	04 Nhue Giang, Nguyen Trai Ward, Ha Dong District	
Quang Trung High School	1985	210 Quang Trung Street, Ha Cau, Ha Dong	
Tran Hung Dao High School	08/1985	National Road 21B, Phu Lam, Ha Dong	
Le Loi High School	24/05/2013	72 Ba Trieu, Ha Cau, Ha Dong	
Bac Tu Liem District
Xuan Dinh High School	1960	Xuan Dinh Ward, Bac Tu Liem, Hanoi	
Thuong Cat High School	2004	Sung Khang Road; Thuong Cat Ward; Bac Tu Liem District	
Nguyen Thi Minh Khai High School	1965	Vo Duy Huan, Phuc Dien Ward, Bac Tu Liem District	
Nam Tu Liem District
Trung Van High School		To Huu streets, Trung Van ward, Nam Tu Liem district	
Dai Mo High School	20/07/2002	Alley 8 Quang Tien, Dai Mo, Nam Tu Liem	
Xuan Phuong High School	26/4/2018	Xuan Phuong Ward, Nam Tu Liem District	
My Dinh High School	?		Under construction
Long Bien District
Ly Thuong Kiet High School	2002	Group 12, Alley 94 Thuong Thanh, Long Bien	
Phuc Loi High School	2014	Group 6, Phuc Loi Ward, Long Bien District	
Nguyen Gia Thieu High School	1950	27 alley 298 Ngoc Lam, Long Bien	
Thach Ban High School	2003	Group 12, Long Bien	
Gia Lam District
Cao Ba Quat High School	1961	No 57, Co Bi street, Gia Lam district	
Nguyen Van Cu High School	1977	Thuan Ton - Da Ton - Gia Lam	
Duong Xa High School	09/1971	Duong Xa ward, Gia Lam district	Được tách ra từ trường cấp III Cao Bá Quát.
Yen Vien High School	8/1965		
Soc Son District
Soc Son High School		Phu Lo ward, Soc Son district	
Da Phuc High School	1963	Soc Son town	
Kim Anh High School	09/1965	Highway 2A	
Xuan Giang High School		Soc Son district	
Trung Gia High School	1999	National Road 3, Trung Gia Ward, Soc Son District	
Minh Phu High School		Minh Phu ward, Soc Son district	
Thanh Tri District
Ngo Thi Nham High School		Ta Thanh Oai street, Thanh Tri district	
Dong My High School	2017	Dong My commune, Thanh Tri	
Nguyen Quoc Trinh High School	24/07/2019	Dai Ang commune, Thanh Tri district	
Ngoc Hoi High School	1966	Luu Phai Street, Ngu Hiep Commune, Thanh Tri District	
Me Linh District
Me Linh High School			
Quang Minh High School	06/2000	Chi Dong town, Me Linh district	In June 2000, Quang Minh Semi-public High School was established. In August 2008, Me Linh district merged to Hanoi City, the school changed to Quang Minh High School operating under the model of public school.
Yen Lang High School	1965	Lien Mac commune, Me Linh district	
Tien Thinh High School	2003	Chu Tran village, Tien Thinh commune, Me Linh district	
Tu Lap High School	2008	Tu Lap Commune, Me Linh District	
Tien Phong High School	2004	NH23, Tien Phong commune, Me Linh district	Founded in 2004 under the semi-public school model, by 2008, it was transformed into a public school.
Dong Anh District
Dong Anh High School	1999	Group 8 - Đông Anh Town - Đông Anh district	
Lien Ha High School	1966	Lien Ha, Lo Khe commune, Dong Anh district	
Co Loa High School		Dong Hoi commune, Dong Anh district	
Van Noi High School		Tay hamlet, Dong Anh district	
Bac Thang Long High School	2010	Bau Hamlet - Kim Chung Commune - Dong Anh	
Dan Phuong District
Dan Phuong High School	1962	Phan Dinh Phung Street, Phung Town, Dan Phuong District	
Hong Thai High School	30/10/1996	Cluster 8 - Commune Hong Ha - Dan Phuong District	
Tan Lap High School	02/07/2003	251 Ha Hoi, Tan Lap commune, Dan Phuong district	
Phuc Tho District
Ngoc Tao High School	1983	Cluster 8 - Ngoc Tao commune - Phuc Tho district	
Phuc Tho High School	1966	Vong Xuyen Commune, Phúc Thọ District	Separated from Son Tay high school. In 1978 the school was moved to Vong Xuyen commune, Phuc Tho district.
Van Coc High School	1992	Van Nam commune - Phuc Tho district	
Son Tay Town
Son Tay High School	1959	No. 45, Den Va Street, Trung Hung Ward, Son Tay Town	
Xuan Khanh High School		No. 175, Doc Da Bac, Xuan Khanh, Son Tay	
Tung Thien High School		No. 20, Tung Thien Street, Son Loc Ward, Son Tay Town	
Ba Vi District
Quang Oai High School		Tay Dang town, Ba Vi district	
Ngo Quyen High School		Van Thang Commune, Ba Vi District	
Minh Quang High School		Lac Village, Minh Quang Commune, Ba Vi District	
Ba Vi High School		Village 7 - Ba Trai - Ba Vi	
Bat Bat High School	1965	No. 92, Son Da commune, Ba Vi district	
Ethnic boarding school		Ba Vi district	
Hoai Duc District
Hoai Duc A High School	1966	Kim Chung Di Trach, Kim Chung commune, Hoai Duc district	
Hoai Duc B High School	25/11/1978	An Khanh commune, Hoai Duc district	
Hoai Duc C High School		Phuong Bang commune, Hoai Duc district	
Van Xuan High School		Km 0, tỉnh lộ 79, Cát Quế Hoài Đức	
Quoc Oai District
Quoc Oai High School		Quoc Oai Town, Quoc Oai District	
Cao Ba Quat High School	06/1990	Tan Hoa commune, Quoc Oai district	In June 1990, the school was officially established as Hoai Duc C High School, Hoai Duc District. In January 1994, the school belonged to Quoc Oai district, and was renamed Cao Ba Quat High School by Ha Tay Provincial People's Committee. After consolidating the administrative boundaries of Hanoi and Ha Tay (old), in August 2008 the school was renamed Cao Ba Quat High School.
Minh Khai High School		Can Huu Commune - Quoc Oai District	
Phan Huy Chu High School		Sai Son commune, Quoc Oai district	
Thach That District
Hai Ba Trung High School	07/2002	Tan Xa commune, Thach That district	
Thach That High School		No. 120, Street 84, Commune Kim Quan, Thach That	
Phung Khac Khoan High School		Binh Phu commune, Thach That district	
Bac Luong Son High School		Hamlet 2, Yen Binh commune, Thach That district	thptbacluongson.hanoi.edu.vn
Thanh Oai District
Thanh Oai A High School	09/1965	Do Dong commune, Thanh Oai district	
Thanh Oai B High School	1973	Minh Kha, Thanh Oai district	The original name was 3B Thanh Oai high school, with many different names such as 3B Thanh Oai High School and Thanh Oai B Specialized High School, now named Thanh Oai B High School.
Nguyen Du High School	15/08/1985	Dan Hoa commune, Thanh Oai district	
Thuong Tin District
:Skull: High School	1958	Thị trấn Thường Tín, huyện Thường Tín	
To Hieu High School	1984	Tô Hieu commune	Điện thoại: 024 3375 1390
Van Tao High School	1998	DT427, Van Tao commune, Thuong Tin district	
Nguyen Trai High School		Nhi Khe commune	
Ly Tu Tan High School	/2005	Mai Sao - Commune Nguyen Trai - Thuong Tin District	
Chuong My District
Chuong My A High School	10/1963	42 Yen Son Area - Chuc Son Town - Chuong My District	
Chuong My B High School		Dong Phu Commune, Chuong My District	
Chuc Dong High School		No. 23 Quang Trung - Hoan Kiem Ward, Chuong My District	
Xuan Mai High School	1972	Tan Binh Area, Xuan Mai Town, Chuong My District	
Phu Xuyen District
Phu Xuyen A High School	1957	National Road 1A, Phu Xuyen town, Phu Xuyen district	Phu Xuyen A High School is a precursor from Phu Xuyen Secondary and High School. In the school year 1964 - 1965, the school split up the middle school and took the name of Phu Xuyen high school.
Phu Xuyen B High School	17/11/1971	Chau Giang river bank, Tri Thuy village, Phu Xuyen district	In 1971, Phu Xuyen High School was established. The name was changed to Phu Xuyen B High School.
Dong Quan High School	1975	No. 73, Phuong Duc, Phu Xuyen	The original name was Can Tho high school. In 1977, the school was renamed Dong Quan high school. 80s and 90s of the last century, called Dong Quan high school. In 2000, following the Education Law, the school was renamed Dong Quan High School.
Tan Dan High School	1998	Tân Dân, Phú Xuyên	
Ung Hoa District
Ung Hoa A High School		175 Nguyen Thuong Hien, Van Dinh Town, Ung Hoa District	
Ung Hoa B High School		Dong Tan Commune - Ung Hoa	
Tran Dang Ninh High School	09/1977	Hoa Son commune - Ung Hoa	4/16/1977 was separated from the branch of Ba Tha with the name of Ba Tha High School. Since the school year 1988, the school has moved to Hoa Son Commune, Ung Hoa District, Hanoi City with the name Tran Dang Ninh High School.
Luu Hoang High School	1984	Luu Hoang commune	
Dai Cuong High School		Kim Giang commune	
My Duc District
My Duc A High School	11/1965	Dai Nghia Town, My Duc, Hanoi	
My Duc B High School	08/1972	Tao Khe - An My - My Duc	
My Duc C High School		Doc Tin, My Duc district	
Hop Thanh High School	2004	Hop Thanh commune - My Duc	

=== Financially autonomous ===
School's name	Founded year	Address	Note
Tran Quoc Tuan High School	1999	My Dinh 2 Ward, Nam Tu Liem District	
Phan Huy Chu - Dong Da High School	1997	No. 34, Lane 49, Huynh Thuc Khang Street, Dong Da district	
Hoang Cau High School	1976	No. 27, Lane 44, Nguyen Phuc Lai Street - O Cho Dua Ward - Dong Da District	Hoang Cau High School is a fully self-funded public school under the Department of Education and Training of Hanoi since March 2012
Nguyen Tat Thanh High School	04/07/1998	136 Xuan Thuy, Dich Vong Hau Ward, Cau Giay District	
Experimental Science High School	19/9/2018		Experimental Science High School under the Vietnam Academy of Educational Sciences was established on the basis of merging the Experimental Primary School and the Experimental High School under the Vietnam Academy of Educational Sciences.
High School of Science Education	2016	Base 1: House G4, 144 Xuan Thuy, Cau Giay Facility 2: Pho Kieu Mai, Phuc Dien Ward, Bac Tu Liem	
Forestry High School	30/11/2017	Xuan Mai town	
Hanoi Gifted Gymnastics and Sports High School		Located in Hanoi Senior Athlete Training Center. Le Duc Tho Street, My Dinh 2 Ward, Nam Tu Liem District	

== Non-public high schools ==
Non-public schools include 2 types:

- People-founded high schools: are established by grassroots population communities, invest in building material foundations and ensure operation funding.
- Private high schools: established by social organizations, socio-professional organizations, economic organizations, domestic and foreign investors or individuals, invested in construction of infrastructure and business assurance operating fee with non-state budget capital.

Foreign-owned high schools are private schools with foreign-invested capital, teaching a number of subjects under foreign programs, teaching programs integrated with foreign programs, appraised by the Ministry of Education and Training and licensing. Some schools have invested in Vietnam but registered with international organizations to become an international curriculum school. These schools are internationally recognized and licensed to become member schools in Vietnam.

School's name	Founded year	Location	Note
People-founded high schools
Luong The Vinh High School	01/06/1989	Base 1: Lot C5, Nam Trung Yen Urban Area, Trung Hoa, Cau Giay Facility 2: Yen Xa, Tan Trieu commune, Thanh Tri district	
Multiple Intelligences School (MIS)		Lot TH2 Dich Vong new urban area - Dich Vong ward - Cau Giay district	
Le Quy Don High School	13/02/2018	Lot 1 A2, Ham Nghi Street, My Dinh 1 Urban Area, Cau Dien Ward, Nam Tu Liem District, Hanoi	
Xuan Thuy High School		Hoe Thi - Phuong Canh - Xuan Phuong Village - Tu Liem	
Dao Duy Tu High School	2004	No. 182, Luong The Vinh, Thanh Xuan	
Huynh Thuc Khang High School	1996	54A1 Vu Trong Phung, Thanh Xuan	
Xala High School		Xa la new urban area	
Phan Chu Trinh High School		481 Au Co - Nhat Tan - Tay Ho	
Bao Long martial arts high school		Trai Ho, Co Dong Commune, Son Tay	
Viet Hoang High School		Km12, Cau Dien street, Phuc Dien ward, Bac Tu Liem	
Van Xuan - Long Bien High School		39, 41 alley 310 Nguyen Van Cu, Bo De, Long Bien	
Van Lang High School	1997	No. 160 Ton Duc Thang, Hang Bot Ward, Dong Da District, Hanoi City No. 1 Phan Van Tri, Quoc Tu Giam Ward, Dong Da District, Hanoi City	
Van Hien High School		No. 9 Hai Ba Trung street, Hoàn Kiếm District	
Tri Duc High School		Residential Area No. 5 Phu My, My Dinh 2 Ward, Nam Tu Liem District	
Phan Boi Chau High School	2/7/1996	No. 21 Vu Trong Phung, Thanh Xuan Trung Ward, Thanh Xuan District	
Tran Thanh Tong High School		In the No. 1 Construction College - Trung Van Street - Trung Van Ward - Nam Tu Liem District	
Tran Quang Khai High School		Lane 1277/26 Giai Phong Street	
Tran Phu - Ba Vi High School		Tay Dang Town, Ba Vi	
Tran Dai Nghia High School		Phuong Hanh Hamlet - Tan Tien Commune - Chuong My District	
To Hieu - Gia Lam High School		Duong Xa communes	
To Hien Thanh High School		27 Alley, Dong Cac, O Cho Dua Ward, Dong Da District	
Thanh Xuan High School		Tam Hung commune, Thanh Oai district	
Tay Son High School		Group 8, ward Phuc Dong, Long Bien	
Tay Do High School		Phuc Phuc Group, Minh Khai Ward, Bac Tu Liem District	
Phuong Nam High School		Lot 18, Dinh Cong urban area, Hoang Mai	
Phung Khac Khoan - Dong Da High School		No. 85 Luong Dinh Cua Street	
Phu Binh High School		Facility 1 Area 900, Phu Man, Quoc Oai, Headquarters 2: Village 9- Thach Hoa -Thach That	
Pham Van Dong High School		Base 1: House A2 - University of Theater and Cinema, Ho Tung Mau Street, Cau Giay Base 2: Urban area, Giao Luu 232-234 Pham Van Dong street	
Nguyen Van Huyen High School		Alley 157, Lang pagoda street, Dong Da district	
Nguyen To High School		Thanh Xuan District	
Nguyen Tat Thanh - Son Tay High School		Son Tay	
Nguyen Du - Me Linh High School		Dai Thinh Commune, Me Linh District	
Nguyen Dinh Chieu High School		Box 14 Lot 6 temple lu 1 - Hoang Mai	
Ngo Tat To High School		Kim Chung Commune - Dong Anh	
Ngo Si Lien High School		Chien Thang Area, Xuan Mai Town	
Ngo Quyen - Dong Anh High School		Vinh Thanh Hamlet, Vinh Ngoc Commune, Dong Anh	
Ngo Gia Tu High School		82 Le Trong Tan, Thanh Xuan	
Minh Tri High School		Thang Tri Hamlet, Minh Tri Commune, Soc Son District	
Mai Hac De High School		29A Lane Vinh Tuy, Hai Ba Trung / Intecen Building, Lot 2, Area 10A, No. 431 Tam Trinh, Hoang Mai	
Mac Dinh Chi High School		128 Kim Anh Street, Thanh Xuan, Soc Son	
Ly Thanh Tong High School		Duong Xa Commune	
Ly Thai To High School		Số 165, Phố Hoàng Ngân, Trung Hòa ward	
Luong Van Can High School		Lot NT1, Nam Trung Yen Urban Area, Trung Hoa Ward, Cau Giay	
Luong The Vinh - Ba Vi High School		Km 56 National Highway 32, Vat Phu Village, Vat Lai Commune, Ba Vi District	
Le Van Thiem High School		44 O Cach Street, Long Bien	
Le Thanh Tong High School		Viet Yen Hamlet, Ngu Hiep Commune, Thanh Tri District	
Le Ngoc Han High School		No. 36/670, Ha Huy Tap Street, Yen Vien Town, Gia Lam	
Lam Hong High School		Block 5 - Phu Lo Commune - Soc Son District	
Lac Long Quan High School		Group 1, Soc Son Town	
Kinh Do High School		Uy No commune - Dong Anh	
IVS Boarding School		Kim Bai Town, Thanh Oai District	
Hong Ha High School		780 Minh Khai, Hai Ba Trung	
Hong Duc High School			
Hong Bang High School		Facility 1: Số 169 Nguyễn Ngọc Vũ, Trung Hòa, Cầu Giấy Facility 2: Dong Anh Town	
Hoang Mai High School		54A2 Vu Trong Phung, Thanh Xuan	
Hoang Long High School		347 Đội Cấn, phường Liễu Giai, Ba Đình	
Hoang Dieu High School		9 Bui Ngoc Duong, Bach Mai Ward, Hai Ba Trung District	
Ho Xuan Huong High School		No. 1, Nguyen Quy Duc streets, Thanh Xuan	
Ho Tung Mau High School		18 Khuong Ha - Khuong Dinh - Thanh Xuan	
Hermann Gmeiner Hanoi High School		No. 02 Doan Ke Thien, Mai Dich Ward, Cau Giay District	
Ha Dong High School		Mo Lao urban area, Mo Lao ward, Ha Dong	
Green City Academy High School		No. 31, group 23, group 6, Ha Dinh Ward, Thanh Xuan District	
FPT High School	2013	FPT University campus, Hoa Lac Hi-Tech Park, Km 28 Thang Long Boulevard, Thach That	
Einstein High School		169 Nguyen Ngoc Vu, Trung Hoa, Cau Giay	
Dong Kinh High School		18C Nguyen Tam Trinh, Hai Ba Trung	
Dong Do High School		8 Pho Vong Thi Street, Buoi Ward, Tay Ho	
Phan Chu Trinh private high school		671 Hoang Hoa Tham Street, Cong Vi Ward, Ba Dinh	
Dinh Tien Hoang - Ba Dinh High School		67 Pho Duc Chinh, Ba Dinh No. 5 Pham Su Manh, Hoan Kiem	
Dang Tien Dong High School		Noi An, Commune Dai Yen, Chuong My District	
Dang Thai Mai High School		Hamlet 4, Hong Ky Commune, Soc Son	
Hanoi Private High School		Facility 1: 131 Nguyen Trai, Thanh Xuan Facility 2: 88 Tran Nhat Duat, Hoan Kiem	
Dai Viet High School		301 Nguyen Trai, Thanh Xuan	
Binh Minh High School		Duc Thuong communes	
Bac Duong High School		76 Doc La - Yen Thuong commune - Gia Lam district	
An Duong Vuong High School		Group 12, Dong Anh Town, Dong Anh District	
TH School		No. 4-6 Chua Boc, Dong Da	
Ha Thanh High School		36A Pham Van Dong, Co Nhue, Bac Tu Liem	
Ta Quang Buu High School		94 A Le Thanh Nghi, Bach Khoa Ward, Hai Ba Trung District	
M.V.Lomonoxop High School		My Dinh 2 urban area, Le Duc Tho Street, Nam Tu Liem	
Phung Hung High School		Center for Thuong Tin KT, Thuong Tin district	
Nguyen Truc High School		Dong Quang	
Nguyen Truong To High School		Tan Hoi, Dan Phuong	
Bac Ha - Dong Da High School	1999	No. 31, Lane 475/49 Nguyen Trai, Thanh Xuan District	
Ngo Gia Tu High School		No. 1A, Lane 538, Duong Lang, Dong Da	
Ngo Si Lien High School		Group 5, Chien Thang area, Xuan Mai town, Chuong My district	
Phung Hung High School		Thuong Tin	
Nguyen Binh Khiem - Phu Xuyen High School		Khai Thai commune, Phu Xuyen district	
Nguyen Thuong Hien - Ung Hoa High School		No.2 dike road, Van Dinh town, Ung Hoa district	
Private high schools
Marie Curie High School		TH1, Tran Van Lai street, My Dinh urban area- Me Tri, My Dinh 1 ward	
Nguyen Binh Khiem High School		No. 6- Tran Quoc Hoan, Dich hop Hau Ward, Cau Giay	
Ban Mai High School		Lot TH4, Van Phu urban area, Phu La ward, Ha Dong district	
Nguyen Hue High School		Nam Cuong Urban Area - Lane 234 Hoang Quoc Viet, Co Nhue 1 Ward, Bac Tu Liem District	
Pham Ngu Lao High School		Nam Hong commune, Dong Anh	
Phan Huy Chu - Thach That High School		Binh Phu commune - Thach That district	
Vinschool	2013	T35, T36, T37 Times City, Minh Khai, Hai Ba Trung	
Archimedes Dong Anh Middle School, Secondary School & High School		Lot I-F1, Urban Area 23B, Tien Duong, Dong Anh	
IVS High School		Group 1, Kim Bai town, Thanh Oai district	
Foreign-owned high schools
Wellspring International Bilingual School		No. 95, Pho Ai Mo Street, Bo De Ward, Long Bien District, Hanoi	
Thang Long International High School		Lot X1, Urban Area Bac Linh Dam, Hoang Mai	
Olympia Intermediate School (The Olympia School)		Trung Van - Nam Tu Liem New Urban Area	
Newton Grammar School	2009	Hoang Quoc Viet New Urban Area - Co Nhue 1 Ward - Bac Tu Liem	
Hanoi Academy International Bilingual School	2009	House D45-D46 Nam Thang Long International Urban Area - CIPUTRA, Tay Ho District	
Doan Thi Diem High School		Bac Co Nhue urban area- Co Nhue 2 ward-Bac Tu Liem district	
Alfred Nobel School		Lane 14, Fort Lang, Lang Thuong Ward, Dong Da	
Vietnam - Australia School, Hanoi		My Dinh I - My Dinh - Nam Tu Liem urban area	
Nguyen Sieu School	11/09/1991	Trung Kinh Street, Yen Hoa, Cau Giay	
TH School Hoa Lac		Km 9, Hoa Lac and Thach That high-tech parks	
Vietnam International School (VIS)		Duong Noi Ward - Ha Dong District	
Hoa Binh Latrobe School, Hanoi		No. 65 Cam Hoi, Dong Mac, Hai Ba Trung District	
Global High School		Lot C1, C2 - Yen Hoa new urban area - Cau Giay district	
Vinschool The Harmony	2/1/2018	Long Bien	

== International high schools ==
In Vietnam, there is no specific definition for this type of school. However, the Ministry of Education and Training confirmed that only 12 schools were considered international in Hanoi, these schools were 100% foreign invested or some were established by the Inter-Ministry of Education and Training and the Ministry of Foreign Affairs; taught by foreign programs (taught in foreign languages).

School's name	Founded year	Address	Note
British Vietnamese International School, Hanoi (BVIS Royal)	08/2013	72A, Nguyen Trai street, Thanh Xuan district	British Vietnamese International School Hanoi
British International School Hanoi (BIS Hanoi)		H3-H4, Vincom Village, Long Bien	
Korean International School in Hanoi		extended Le Duc Tho street, Mai Dich ward, Cau Giay district	
Japanese School of Hanoi		No. 36 To Huu Street, Van Phuc Ward, Ha Dong District	
Lycée français Alexandre Yersin		36 Gia Thuong, Long Bien	
Hanoi International School (HIS)		48 Lieu Giai, Cong Vi ward, Ba Dinh district	
United Nations International School of Hanoi (UNIS Hanoi)		G9, ku Ciputra urban area, Tay Ho district	
Concordia International School Hanoi		Tho Da village, Kim No commune, Dong Anh district	
Horizon International Bilingual School	2007	Villa 1 & 2, 98 Tô Ngọc Vân, Tây Hồ District	
Singapore International School in Hanoi		C2 - Gamuda Gardens new urban area, Yen So ward - Tran Phu ward, Hoang Mai district	
St.Paul International School		Splendora new urban area, Km10 + 600, Thang Long Boulevard, An Khanh commune, Hoai Duc district	
ParkCity Hanoi International School		ParkCity urban area, Le Trong Tan street, La Khe ward, Ha Dong district	
