= Cầu Giấy district =

District of Hanoi, Vietnam

Cầu Giấy district Quận Cầu Giấy
- Urban district
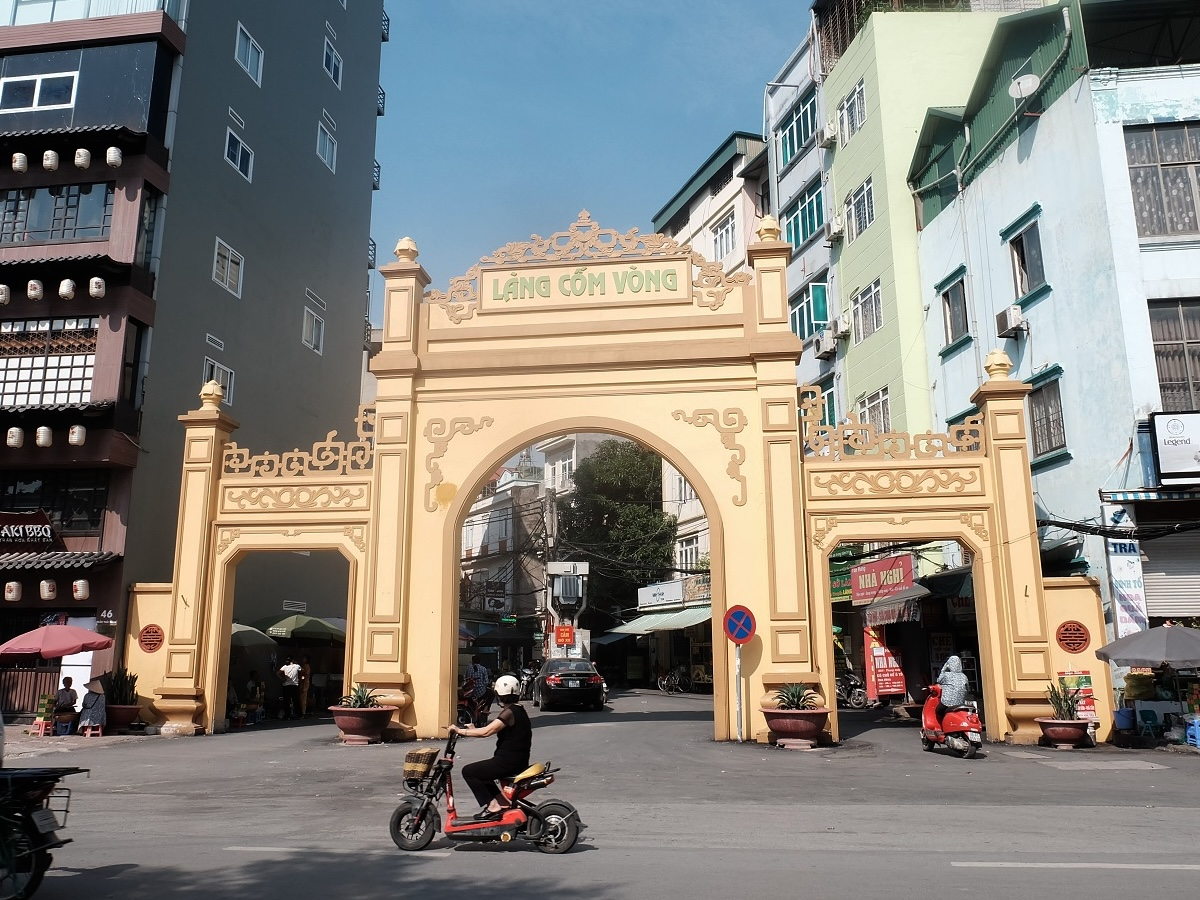
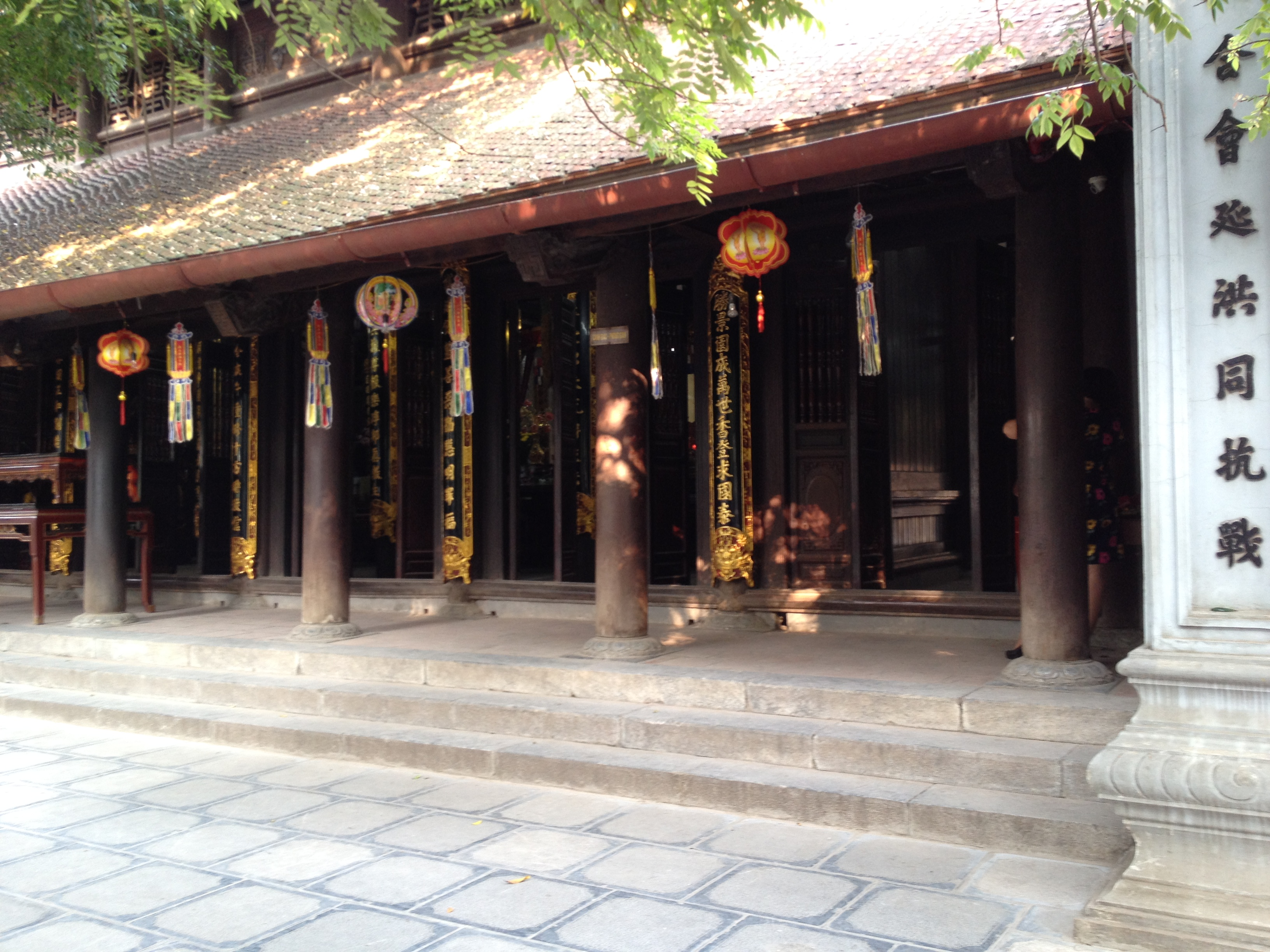
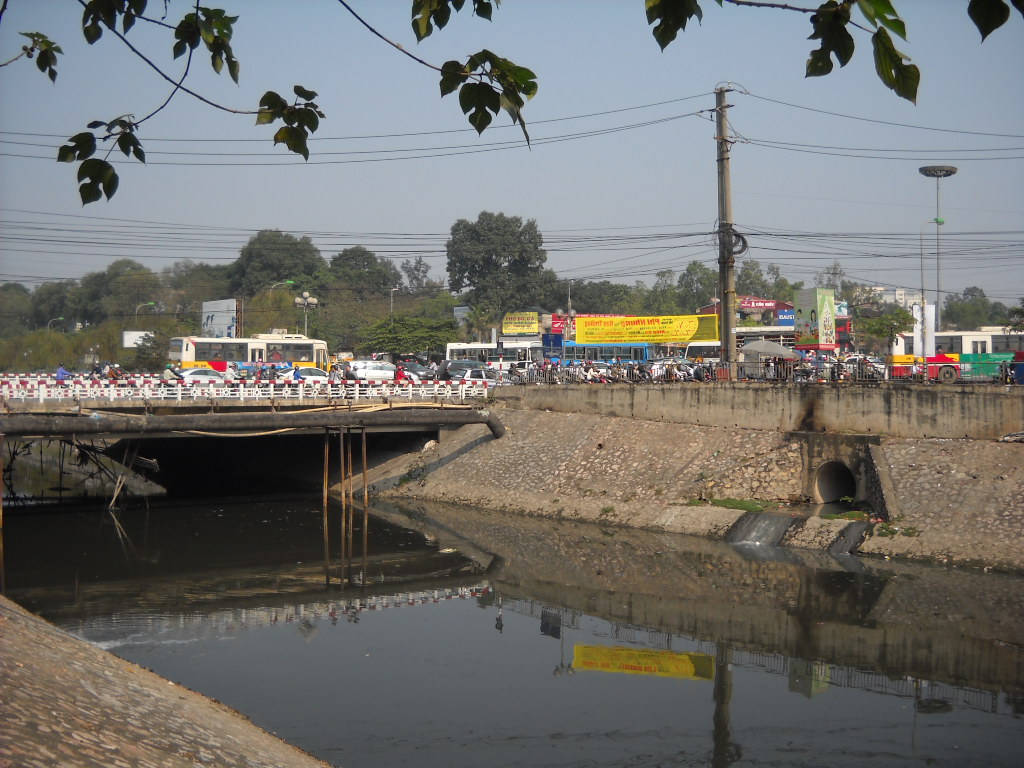
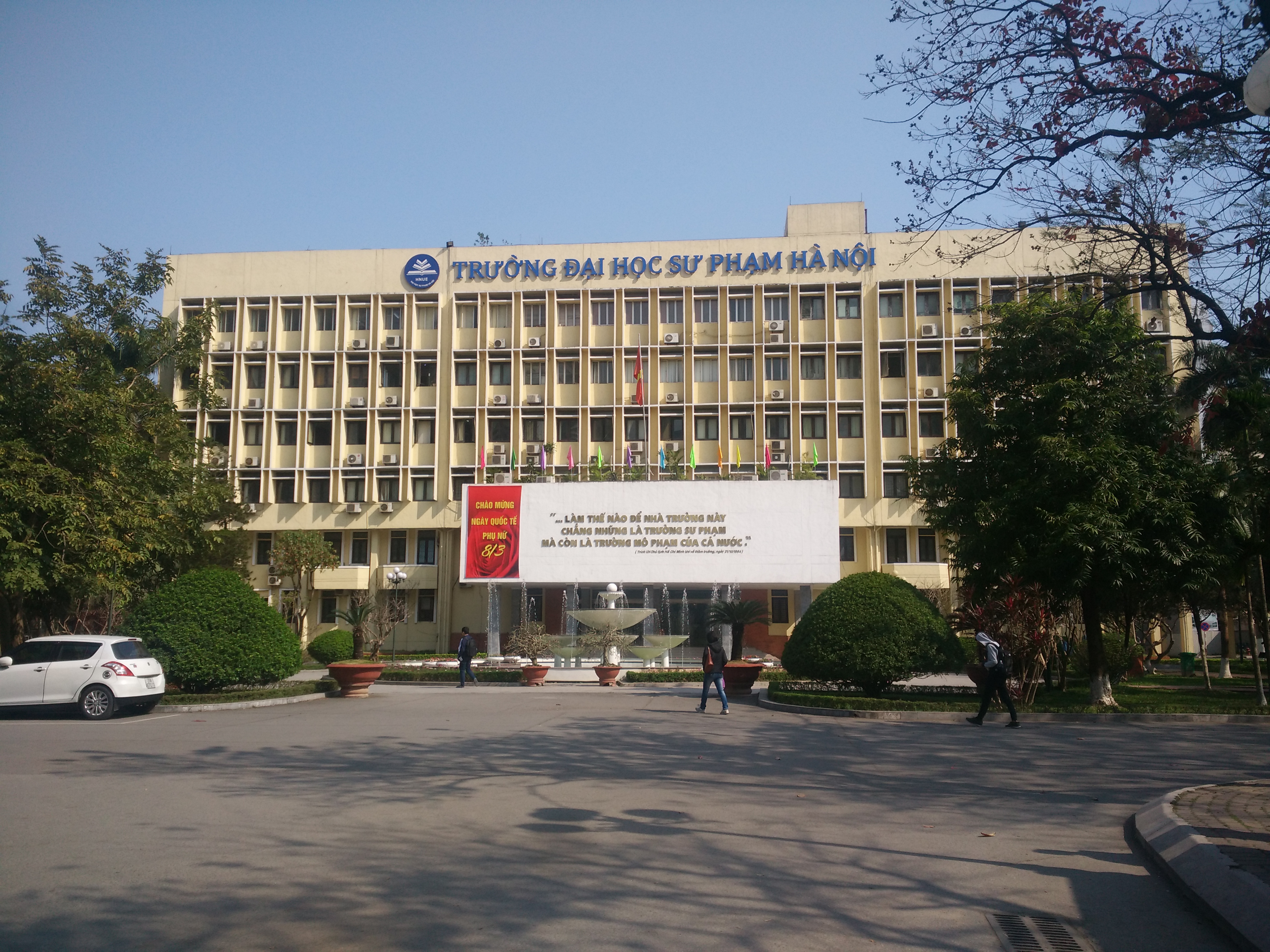
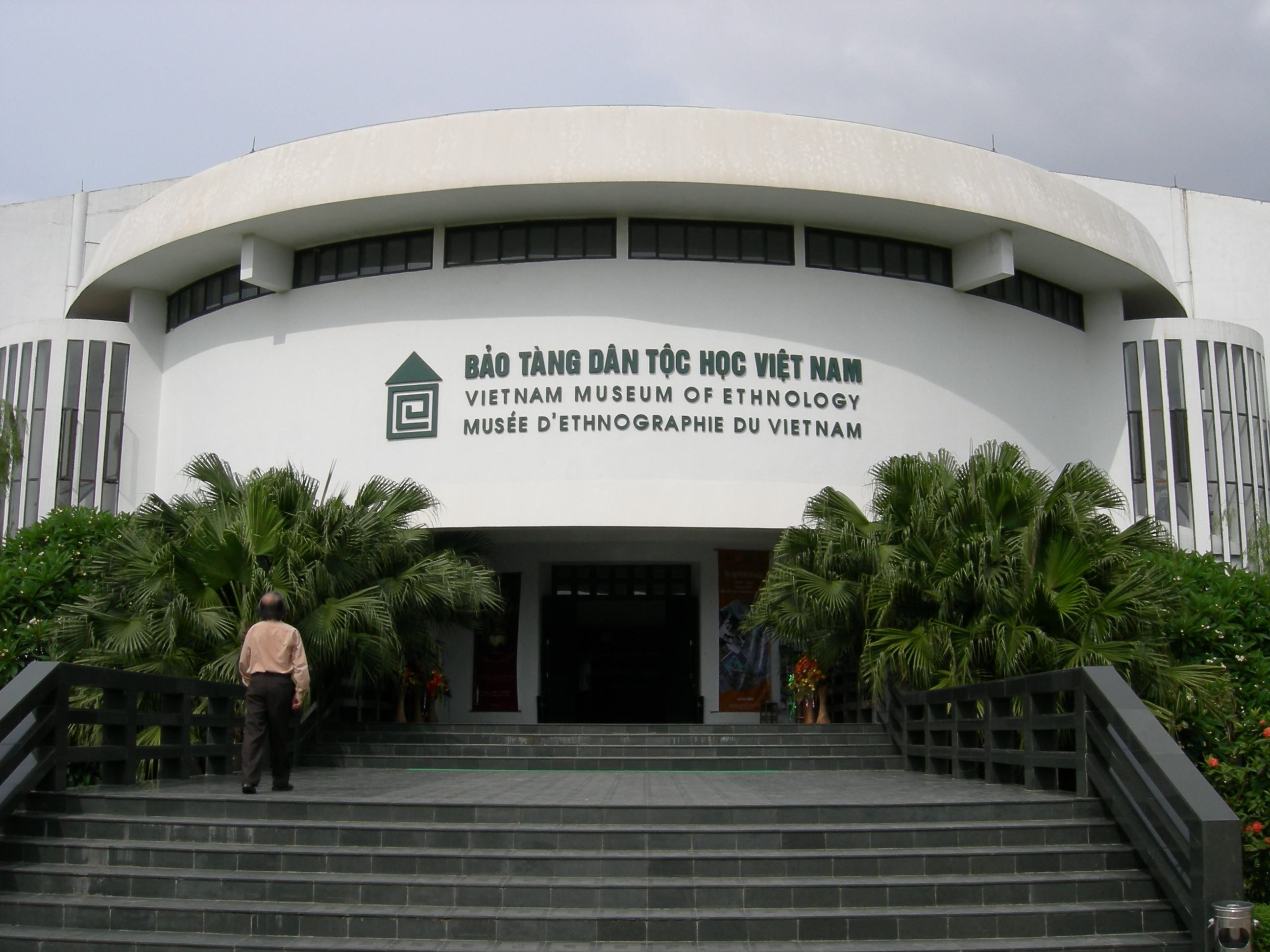
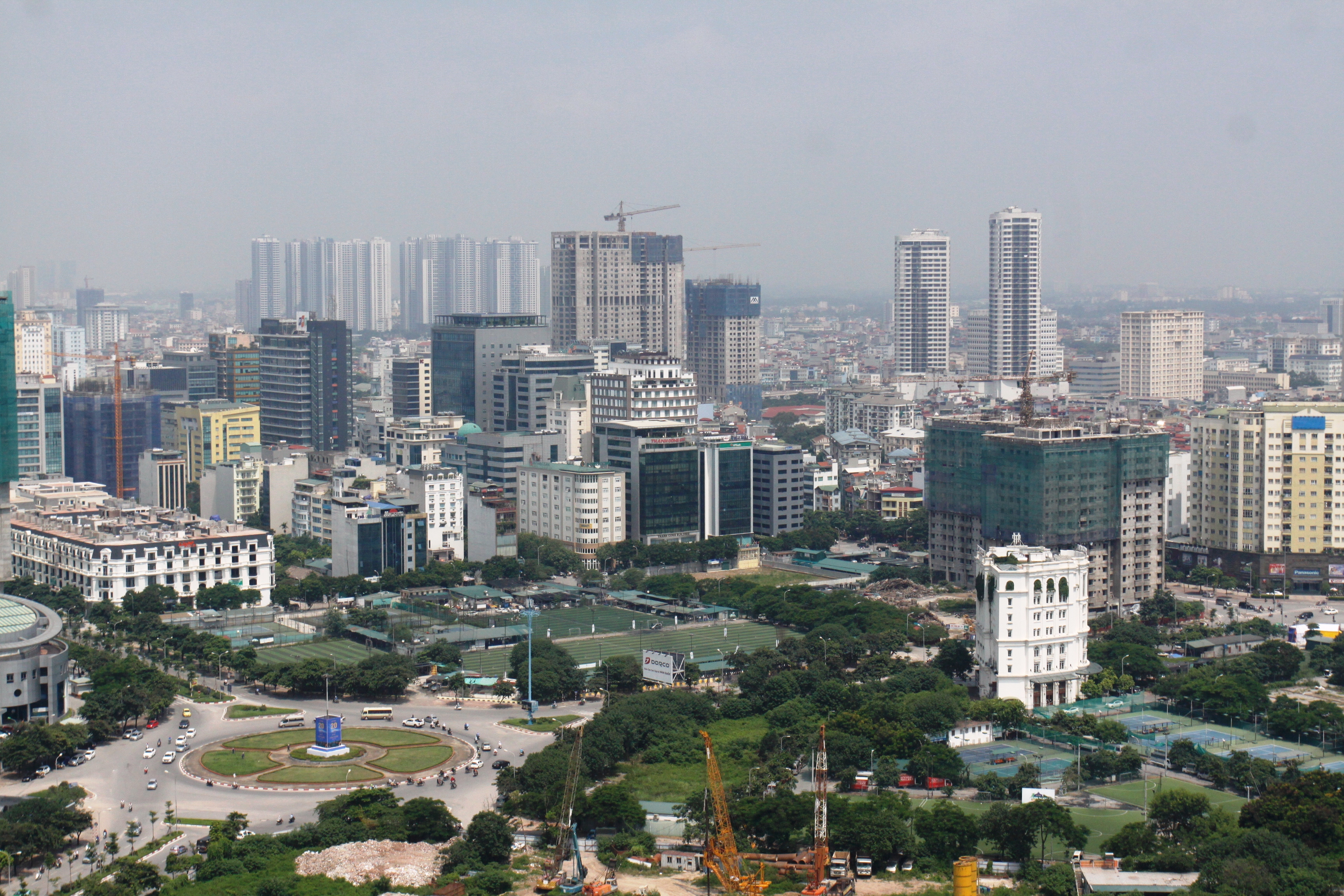
- Dịch Vọng village's gate titled "Cốm of village Vòng" Hà Temple Paper Bridge and Tô Lịch River Hanoi National University of Education Vietnam Museum of Ethnology Skyline view of new estate developments
- Interactive map of Cầu Giấy district
- Coordinates: 21.03°N 105.79°E
- Country: Vietnam
- Region: Red River Delta
- Province: Hanoi
- Commune-level town founding: 13 October 1982
- District founding: 22 November 1996
- Wards: Nghĩa Đô, Yên Hòa, Cầu Giấy

Government
  - Type: Three ward-level governments
  - People's Committee President: Bùi Tuấn Anh
  - People's Council President: Nguyễn Văn Chiến
  - District's Committee Secretary: Trần Thị Phương Hoa

Area
  - Total: 12.18 km^{2} (4.70 sq mi)

Population (2024)
  - Total: 294,235
  - Density: 24,160/km^{2} (62,570/sq mi)

GRDP (2023)
  - Total: 235,920 billion VND, US$9.83 billion (Note: Assuming average conversion rate of 24,000 VND = 1 USD in 2023)
- Time zone: UTC+7 (ICT)
- Postal codes in Vietnam: 113xx
- Area code: 24
- Website: caugiay.hanoi.gov.vn,nghiado.hanoi.gov.vn,yenhoa.hanoi.gov.vn

Cầu Giấy (anglicized as Cau Giay) is an urban district of Hanoi, the capital city of Vietnam. It is located roughly to the west of urban Hanoi. Cầu Giấy has a unique urban landscape, with new urban developments interlacing old historical artisan villages. The most well-known of them is a cluster of Dịch Vọng villages (aka Cốm Vòng 'village') with its popular cốm dessert.

With a population of roughly 300,000, Cầu Giấy hosts many administrative and corporate headquarters within the Trung Hoà–Nhân Chính urban area. Cầu Giấy is also considered to be an education hub of Hanoi due to its high concentration of universities and magnet schools. About two-third of Cầu Giấy district's source of income comes from the service sector (mainly from small businesses) and one-third comes from the manufacturing sector. The district contains only a few tourist landmarks such as Vietnam Museum of Ethnology, Hà Temple, and Mai Dịch Cemetery.

Present-day Cầu Giấy district was a rural agricultural area, scattered by a few artisanal villages, and lay within Từ Liêm, a periphery district of Thăng Long city. On 22 November 1996, the area was officially split from Từ Liêm and incorporated into a district, taking its name from a nearby bridge also named Cầu Giấy (lit. 'Paper Bridge'). Along with other urban districts of Hanoi, Cầu Giấy experienced very rapid urbanization since the 2000s, causing rapid economic development and intense gentrification in the process. By the 2020s, Cầu Giấy had ran out of construction land.

== Etymology ==
The Paper Bridge, Cầu Giấy written in English, was just a small bridge crossing over Tô Lịch River existed for many centuries. The name was taken from papermaking villages nearby the bridge named Thượng Yên Quyết. There is a myth that the gate to Thăng Long named Ô Cầu Giấy (lit. "Cầu Giấy Gate") was situated at that spot before it was destroyed by the French colonists, but historians determined that the gate was probably at a parking lot at Kim Mã street near the Presidential Palace.

== History ==
=== Monarchal period ===
Present-day Cầu Giấy district was a rural agricultural area and lay within the periphery of Thăng Long. Cầu Giấy was part of Từ Liêm district, under the jurisdiction of Quốc Oai prefecture, Sơn Tây province. The area has several artisanal villages that has existed for centuries. Some families Nghĩa Đô village was known for producing sắc paper, a special type of paper used to write royal edicts, and for being one of the earliest places in Hanoi to weave silk and brocade. Thượng Yên Quyết and Yên Hòa villages were specialized in papermaking. Vòng village has a long-standing tradition of producing cốm and An Phú village in Nghĩa Đô was known for making malt candy. Giàn village in Trung Hòa was renowned around Hanoi for making incense sticks.

In present-day Nghĩa Đô ward, there is a temple dedicated to general Trần Công Tích and a shrine honoring the Lê sisters, who assisted emperor Lê Hoàn in the Song–Đại Cồ Việt war in 981. The Dụ Ân Pagoda was where emperor Lý Công Ẩn, a member of the Lý dynesty, frequently practiced Buddhism.

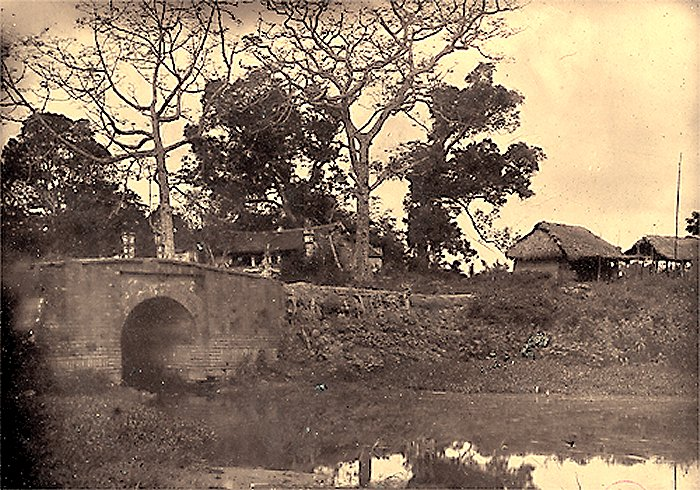
The historic Paper Bridge, taken around 1884–1885

In the 12th year of Emperor Minh Mạng's reign (1831), the Nguyễn dynasty carried out administrative reforms, dividing the country into 29 provinces. The capital, Thăng Long, became a provincial city, and the area fell under Hoài Đức prefecture in Hà Nội province. The Battle of Cầu Giấy in 1883 was fought near the Paper Bridge. By the end of 1889, it became part of An Hạ canton, Hoàn Long district. In 1915, Hoàn Long district was merged into Hà Đông province, and by 1918, the area was under Hoài Đức prefecture in Hà Đông province. In early 1943, the area separated from Hà Đông and was placed under the special administration of Hà Nội (Hoàn Long special district).

=== Republic period ===
In mid-1941, Cầu Giấy was chosen by the Viet Minh as a secret base, serving as a key communication hub. By 1945, Cầu Giấy became a strategic location in Hanoi for organizing the August Revolution. On the evening of 15 August 1945, the key revolutionists at Hanoi convened an emergency meeting at Hà Temple. On the evening of 16 August 1945, at a residential house in Dịch Vọng Tiền village, Cầu Giấy, the revolutionists planned to launch the uprising on the morning of 19 August against the colonial government.

After the successful revolution, the revolutionary government again performed administrative reforms. In May 1946, the area became part of the Đại La district on the outskirts of Hà Nội. In 1947, it was placed under District IV, later known as Trấn Tây district. From 1949 to 1954, it belongs to an outskirt rural district. After the liberation of the capital, from 1956, it was part of District VI. In 1961, when Hà Nội expanded its boundaries, the city abolished the urban districts and established four inner-city districts and four suburban districts, with Từ Liêm district being reinstated, incorporating the land of Districts V and VI.

During this time, many universities and academies were founded in the Cầu Giấy area, such as the Hanoi National University of Education in 1951 and Ho Chi Minh National Academy of Politics in 1949.

=== Establishment of the district ===
Location of Cầu Giấy in Hanoi

The modern incarnation of Cầu Giấy district was formulated on 22 November 1996, via the merger of four towns (Cầu Giấy, Nghĩa Đô, Nghĩa Tân, Mai Dịch) and three communes (Dịch Vọng, Yên Hòa, Trung Hòa) within the old Từ Liêm district. All towns and communes were reclassified to wards, and Cầu Giấy town was renamed to Quan Hoa ward. The edict went to effect on 1 September 1997.

Most residents received the district establishment positively, as it is closely related to hopes that new symbolic, infrastructural, and economic improvements. The district's establishment was a decade after Đổi Mới economic reforms was initiated in 1986, when Vietnam was one of the least-developed countries. In 1997, Cầu Giấy district's gross regional domestic product (GRDP) is 120 billion VND (US$10.8 million in that year's exchange rate); two decades later in 2016, Cầu Giấy's GRDP is 206,000 billion VND (US$9050 million in that year's exchange rate), a two orders of magnitude increase. By 2022, 25 years after district establishment, Cầu Giấy no longer has any near-poverty households; near-poverty line is defined as a personal income of less than 2 million VND (US$83.33) per month.

However, rapid urbanization also bring severe negative effects to the district. Intense gentrification threatened the artisanal craft of historical villages. Most coverage about this problem in Cầu Giấy surrounds the Vòng villages that produce cốm, a dessert made from sweet glutinous rice and staple of Hanoi cuisine. Before the establishment of Cầu Giấy, most families have a small plot of farmland. Urbanization meant that the rice now needs to be sourced from surrounding provinces and compare to other urban occupations making cốm is unprofitable, leaving many to stop practicing the craft. The craft remains threatened as fewer than ten families are still practicing the craft and cốm making is not under government cultural protection programs. By 2013, there was only one woman practicing Nghĩa Đô village's sắc papermaking craft. These endangerment stories are similar to other artisanal villages around Hanoi.

Many acres of residential land in Cầu Giấy are planned to be replaced by public infrastructures and residential areas, but inconsistency between the development plans, map of the area and actual position of residential houses created a "forced eviction chaos". In one case, the government mistakenly issued a construction permit to a woman's family despite the land being part of a planned development project. Some of these newly residential areas remained unoccupied due to the government's overestimation of real estate demand, and a few greenfield lands remain abandoned for decades due to bureaucracy and corruption. Real estate speculation is rampant in Cầu Giấy; when a plan to rebuild the deteriorating Nghĩa Tân residential area was announced, land price surged to 50 million VND (2080 USD) per square meter. For reference, this is close to the price range of a brand new apartment in the district.

There have been some slight changes to the district's boundary since its founding. On 5 January 2005, Quan Hoa and Dịch Vọng ward's border was adjusted to form the new Dịch Vọng Hậu ward. On 1 January 2021, the border of Nghĩa Tân and Mai Dịch wards was expanded, annexing parts of nearby Bắc Từ Liêm and Nam Từ Liêm district.

== Geography ==
Cầu Giấy district situates roughly to the west of urban Hanoi. The district is bordered by Ba Đình and Đống Đa districts to the east, with the Tô Lịch River as the boundary. It is adjacent to Nam Từ Liêm district to the west, Thanh Xuân district to the south, and Tây Hồ and Bắc Từ Liêm districts to the north. In 2025, the district has an area of 12.18 km^{2} (4.70 mi^{2}).

Like Hanoi, under the Köppen climate classification Cầu Giấy district has a humid subtropical climate (Cfa). There is significant air pollution in Cầu Giấy like other urban districts of Hanoi. A study by Vietnam National University in 2022 determined that most of the air pollution in Cầu Giấy is caused by particulates. Nitrogen oxides, carbon monoxide and sulfur dioxide in the air are also present in significant amount.

=== Administrative divisions ===
In 2005, Cầu Giấy district was divided into eight wards (phường) with names loosely inspired from historical villages in the area (see citations and links at § Historical villages):

1. Dịch Vọng encompasses Dịch Vọng Tiền and Dịch Vọng Trung villages.
2. Dịch Vọng Hậu encompasses Dịch Vọng Hậu village.
3. Mai Dịch encompasses Mai Dịch and Dịch Vọng Sở villages.
4. Nghĩa Đô encompasses Bái Ân and Nghĩa Đô villages.
5. Nghĩa Tân encompasses Tân village from the ex-town of Nghĩa Đô and a few neighbourhoods from to the Cổ Nhuế wards and village in Bắc Từ Liêm district.
6. Quan Hoa encompasses Thượng Yên Quyết village.
7. Trung Hòa encompasses Trung Kính Hạ, Trung Kính Thượng and Hoà Mục villages.
8. Yên Hòa encompasses Hạ Yên Quyết and Thượng Yên Quyết villages.

On 15th June 2025, Cầu Giấy district has officially operated its new administrative system within the process of restructuring and reducing ward-level administrative units to 3 wards.

1. Nghĩa Đô encompasses Bái Ân, Nghĩa Đô, Tân, Cổ Nhuế Hoàng, Thượng Yên Quyết villages and a part of the ex-village of Dịch Vọng Sở (ex-ward Mai Dịch)
2. Cầu Giấy encompasses Dịch Vọng Tiền, Dịch Vọng Trung, Dịch Vọng Hậu, Dịch Vọng Sở villages and a few neighbourhoods from the ex-wards of Quan Hoa, Mỹ Đình 1 and Mỹ Đình 2.
3. Yên Hòa encompasses Hạ Yên Quyết, Trung Kính, Hòa Mục villages, a part of Cầu Giấy new urban area (ex-ward of Mễ Trì) including Landmark 72 tower and a part of Trung Hòa-Nhân Chính quarter.

=== Historical villages ===
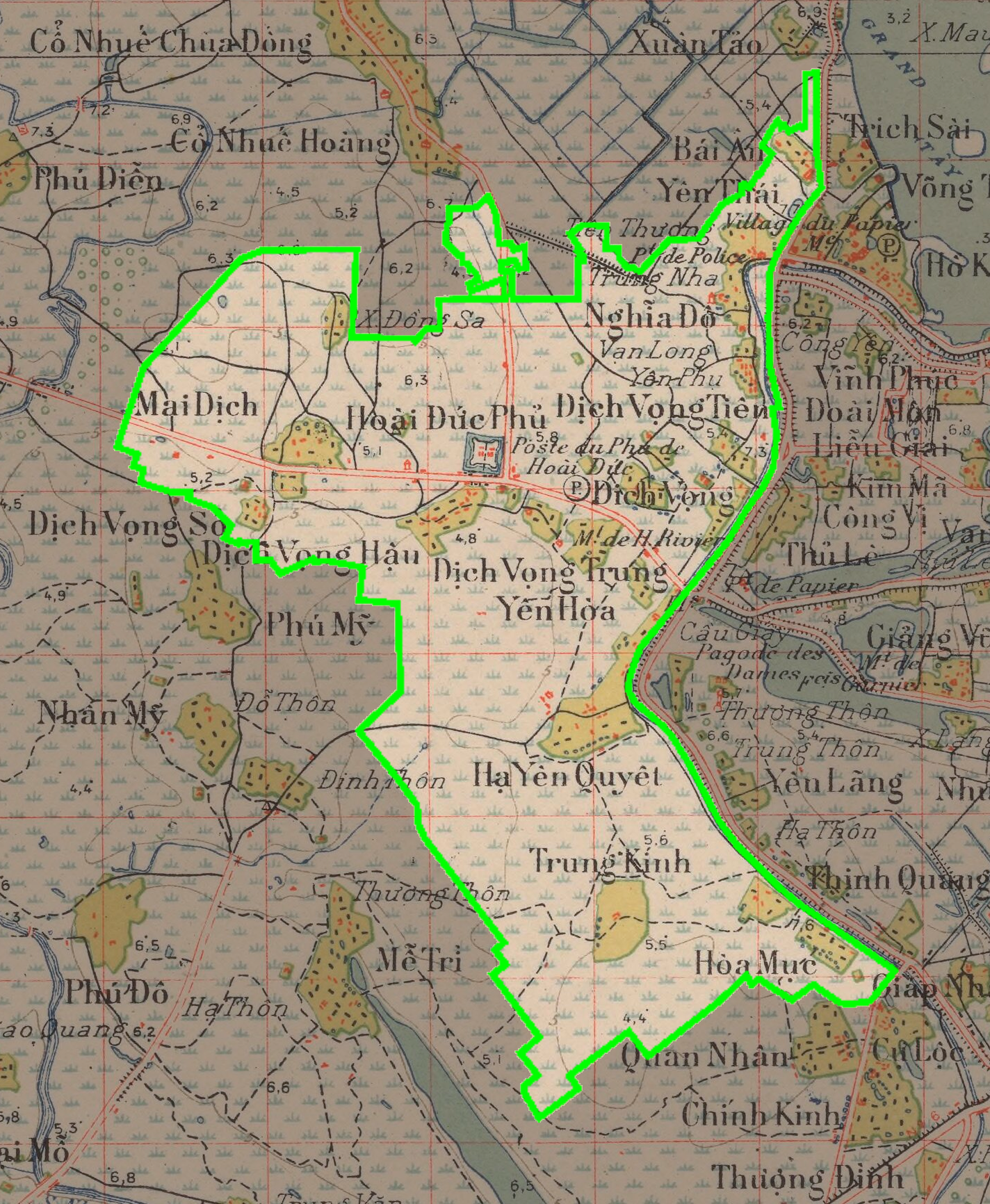
1935 French map of Cầu Giấy showing some of the artisanal villages

Before Cầu Giấy area was urbanized, the area was a large patch of farmland plotted by lakes and dotted by artisanal villages. These villages in one form or another has existed for many centuries. The wooden and straw houses in the villages by the late 20th century were gradually transformed into modern tube houses and house footprint maximization turned the former dirt ground into a maze of concrete alleyways.

Most villages in Cầu Giấy have a specialized craft, a Nôm and a Hanzi name; the Nôm name is likely to be simpler and the original name of the village. For the list of artisanal villages below, the Hanzi name is placed first and the Nôm name is placed in brackets:

1. Dịch Vọng Tiền (probably originally "Tiền Trang") is now in Cầu Giấy ward. The village has four hamlets named Duệ, Tăng, Miễu, Vỹ. Vỹ is the most recent hamlet established around a century ago by villagers at Duệ hamlet.
2. Dịch Vọng Trung (probably originally "Trung Trang") is now in Cầu Giấy ward. The village has three hamlets named Hà, Thọ, Tháp. The village also has the large Hà Temple (literally "temple of Hà hamlet") that existed before the late 17th century.
3. Dịch Vọng Hậu ( originally " Hậu") is now in Cầu Giấy and Nghĩa Đô ward. The villagers maintained the Thánh Chúa Temple and Hoài Đức Fort. The Thánh Chúa Temple is now within the Vietnam National University Hanoi campus but the Hoài Đức Fort has been destroyed.
4. Hạ Yên Quyết (Cót) is now in Yên Hòa ward. Due to its proximity to the imperial palace, relative prosperity due to trade and solid financial incentives to become literates, the village has many who passed the imperial examination and become government officials.
5. Thượng Yên Quyết (Giấy) is now in Nghĩa Đô and Cầu Giấy wards. The village is focused on papermaking and producing textiles. It also has many literates who passed the imperial examination.
6. Trung Kính Hạ (Giàn) is now in Yên Hòa ward. It is mainly an agricultural village though some families also produced incenses. The village also has a small Báo Ân temple with a bell made in 1693 (Chính Hòa 13).
7. Trung Kính Thượng is now in Yên Hòa ward. Like Trung Kính Hạ, the village also produced incenses and has a pig farming tradition for religious purposes.
8. Hoà Mục is now in Yên Hòa ward. It is a fairly small village that has various temples dedicated to Bà mụ and Trưng sisters. By the 1930s, some families there learned how to make textiles.
9. Nghĩa Đô is now in Nghĩa Đô ward, consisting of four hamlets/villages: Tiên Thượng, Trung Nha, Vạn Long and An Phú. It is known for its confectionaries such as sugar candy and douhua, as well for its production of traditional sắc paper.
10. Tân is now in Nghĩa Đô ward. The village is relatively small since it was probably thought as a part of Bái Ân. Also, parts of Cổ Nhuế Hoàng were included within the formation of Nghĩa Tân town in 1992. The name Nghĩa Tân also stands for new Nghĩa Đô
11. Bái Ân is now in Nghĩa Đô ward. The village is fairly small because it was probably originally a hamlet. Most families in the village practiced textile craft. It has a communal house built in the early 17th century that survived to today.
12. Mai Dịch was in its own Mai Dịch ward before getting annexed into the new wards of Từ Liêm and Phú Diễn in 2025. It was formed around the 17th century when villagers from Dịch Vọng Hậu moved westwards.
13. Dịch Vọng Sở is now in Nghĩa Đô and Cầu Giấy wards. It was originally a residential area for plantation workers. By the 20th century, being an agricultural village, it has a large amount of farmland even though it has only around 200 villagers.

What constitutes a 'village' might be a bit fuzzy since they had existed for many centuries. Some villages are grouped together into bigger villages for administrative purposes. During the French Indochina period, the colonial government grouped Tiên Thượng, Trung Nha, Vạn Long and An Phú into a "Nghĩa Đô" village/ward. Dịch Vọng Tiền, Dịch Vọng Hậu, Dịch Vọng Trung, Dịch Vọng Sở villages are colloquially called "Dịch Vọng" or "Vòng". This cluster of villages are known for its cốm dessert, made from sweet glutinous rice. In the 21st century, they are collectively known as "Cốm Vòng village". A few villages were split due to population growth. For example, Trung Kính (probably originally named Kính Chủ) was split into Trung Kính Hạ and Trung Kính Thượng villages.

=== Residential areas ===
According to one news article in 2022, there are 12 new residential areas in the district. Some of them are:

- Trung Hoà–Nhân Chính urban area, which lies at the border of Cầu Giấy and features commercial buildings.
- Thăng Long International Village, which despite its name it is an apartment complex mostly resided by locals.

== Society ==
=== Culture ===
Compare to other districts in Hanoi, Cầu Giấy has a high concentration of educational institutions. During the academic year, thousands of students from surrounding districts and provinces stay in the area, creating a small economy around student life. For instance, near the Hanoi Vietnam National University is the Nhà Xanh marketplace (lit. Green House). Till the 2000s, the marketplace mainly sell groceries, but by the 2020s, like many smaller market around Cầu Giấy, the Nhà Xanh marketplace mainly sells counterfeit clothing, jewelry, footwear imported from China as well as cheap snacks.

=== Demographics ===
Historical population
Year	Pop.	±%
1999	147,450	—
2009	225,643	+53.0%
2019	292,536	+29.6%
2024	294,235	+0.6%
Source: 1999 (est.), 2009, 2019

Since Cầu Giấy is a fairly new district, it only has three decadal censuses as of 2024 that reports basic data about the population. There is no official data from the government about ethnic and religious distribution, but it is probably safe to assume that like Hanoi, the Kinh people is the majority ethnicity.

=== Economy ===
From 1997 to 2016, Cầu Giấy district's gross regional domestic product (GRDP) experienced immense growth, from 120 to 206,000 billion VND (10.8 to US$9050 million USD in that year's exchange rate). In 2022, about two-third of Cầu Giấy's economy comes from the service sector (mainly from small businesses) and the other one-third comes from the manufacturing sector. The agricultural sector, which was a significant portion of the district's economy when Cầu Giấy was established, had completely disappeared in 2006.

Cầu Giấy district is home to large Vietnamese technology companies, such as FPT Corporation, Vietnam Posts and Telecommunications Group, Viettel, Mobifone, and CMC Corporation as well as the Cầu Giấy concentrated IT Park.

=== Government ===
According to Hanoi's government, Cầu Giấy's economic growth is a role model for other districts. The district's government has received many awards from the Communist Party of Vietnam, the most notable are the two first-class Labor Order received in 2012 and 2022, corresponding to the district's 15th and 25th anniversaries.

Leadership roles in Cầu Giấy district are not democratically elected by the citizens but rather appointed by the People's Committee or the Communist Party itself. Below is the list of politician's holding top position in the district's government; historical data of politician's names is incomplete online.

From 1 July 2025, district-level governments are no longer held in Vietnam as a part of the streamlining state apparatus program. Accordingly, Cầu Giấy district no longer has an unified local government but 3 sovereign wards including Nghĩa Đô, Cầu Giấy and Yên Hòa after reducing the number of ward-level administrative units.

Appointments by Cầu Giấy's Communist Party
Year	Congress	District's Committee Secretary (Bí thư Quận ủy)
2025	7th	TBD
2020	6th	Trần Thị Phương Hoa
2019	5th	Trần Thị Phương Hoa
2018	5th	Vacant, died in office
2015	5th	Lê Văn Luân
2010	4th	Lê Văn Luân
2005	3rd	Nguyễn Đức Hướng
2000(?)	2nd	Vũ Hồng Khanh(?)
1997	1st	Trần Văn Thông(?)

Appointments by Cầu Giấy's People Committee
Year	Congress	People's Committee President (Chủ tịch UBND)	People's Council President (Chủ tịch HĐND)
2026	7th	TBD	TBD
2021	6th	Bùi Tuấn Anh	Nguyễn Văn Chiến
2016	5th	Bùi Tuấn Anh	Nguyễn Văn Chiến
2011	4th	Dương Cao Thanh	Lê Văn Luân
2006(?)	3rd	Bùi Trương Luân	Lê Văn Luân
2004	2nd	Nguyễn Quang Thuận(?)	Lê Văn Luân
2001(?)	2nd	Nguyễn Quang Thuận(?)	(?)
1997	1st	(?)	(?)

== Public amenities ==
=== Academic institutions ===
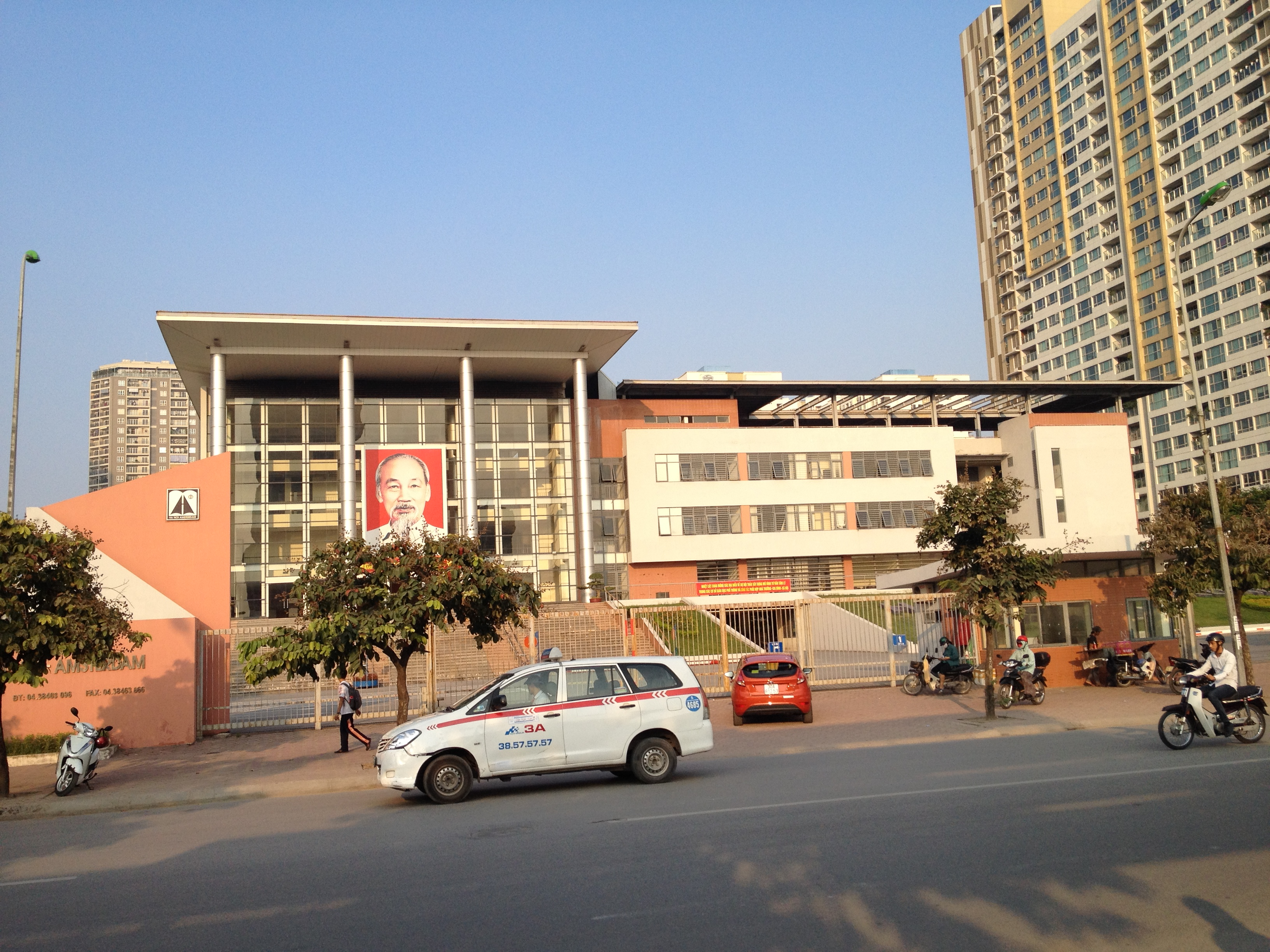
Hanoi – Amsterdam High School in Cầu Giấy is one of the most prestigious high school in Vietnam.

Cầu Giấy hosts a few museums, such as the Vietnam Museum of Ethnology and Vietnam National Museum of Nature. The headquarters of Vietnam Academy of Science and Technology (VAST) and Vietnam's first nuclear research institution – Institute for Nuclear Science and Technology – are also located in Cầu Giấy.

Cầu Giấy host the main Hanoi campus of the Vietnam National University university system, which includes the University of Languages and International Studies. Other universities that have campus in the district includes Hanoi National University of Education, Thuongmai University, Hanoi Metropolitan University, University of Labour and Social Affairs, University of Science and Technology of Hanoi (within the campus of VAST), Hanoi Financial and Banking University, Hanoi Community College and Phuong Dong University.

Notable academies that are in the district include the Academy of Journalism and Communication, Ho Chi Minh National Academy of Politics, Hanoi Academy of Theatre and Cinema, Vietnam Academy of Dance, and Vietnam Judicial Academy. The district also hosts two national-level military academies in Vietnam: Military Technical Academy and National Defense Academy.

Cầu Giấy hosts three specialized high schools: Hanoi – Amsterdam High School, Foreign Language Specialized School, and High School for Gifted Students within Hanoi National University of Education. Notable schools that have an international curriculum are the Korean International School in Hanoi and Nguyễn Siêu School.

=== Cultural landmarks ===
The district has a few Zen and Buddhist temples, such as Hà Temple and Hoa Lăng Pagoda. Mai Dịch Cemetery houses the graves of Communist government leaders and famous revolutionaries.

Wushu events at the 2021 SEA Games took place at Cầu Giấy District Sporting Hall.

In terms of music, Cầu Giấy district is the headquarter of Vietnam National Symphony Orchestra at 226 Cầu Giấy Road and has several café centered around Trịnh Công Sơn's music.

As a major point in United States–Vietnam relations, a new $1.2 billion U.S. embassy compound spanning 3.2 hectares will be located in Cầu Giấy and will be leased for 99 years.

=== Green spaces ===
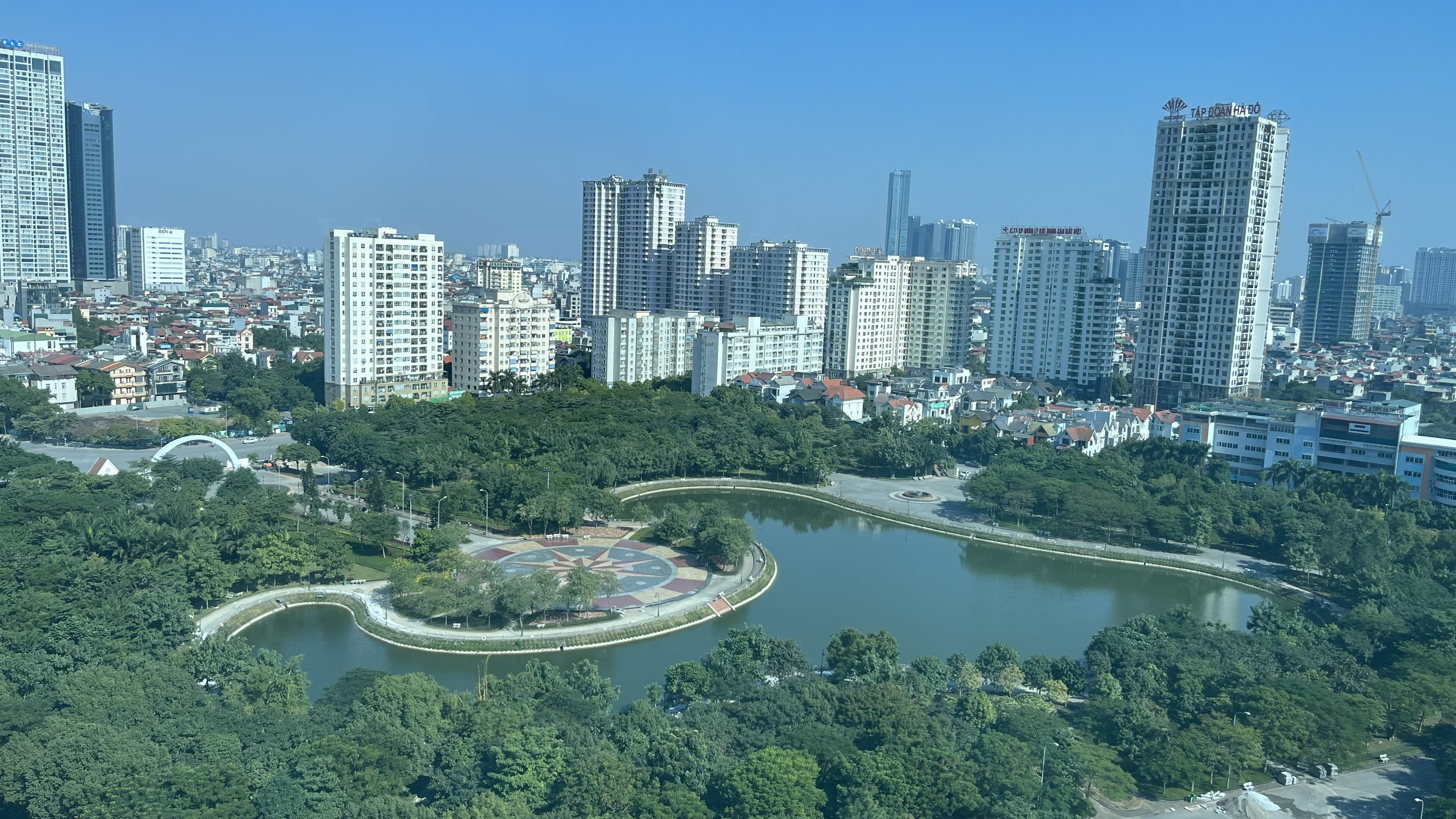
Cầu Giấy park and surrounding buildings

Like Hanoi, Cầu Giấy is lacking greenspaces. As of 2024, there are only two parks serving the whole district: Cầu Giấy park and Nghĩa Đô park. Both are heavily degraded, with cracked pathways, benches, and playgrounds, to the point that some residents use them as waste disposal sites. There is one park that is in construction, which also plans to host Hanoi Children's Palace. A 10-hectares area saddle between Trung Hòa and Yên Hòa wards is designated to become a park, but it has remained abandoned for the past 15 years.

=== Transportation ===
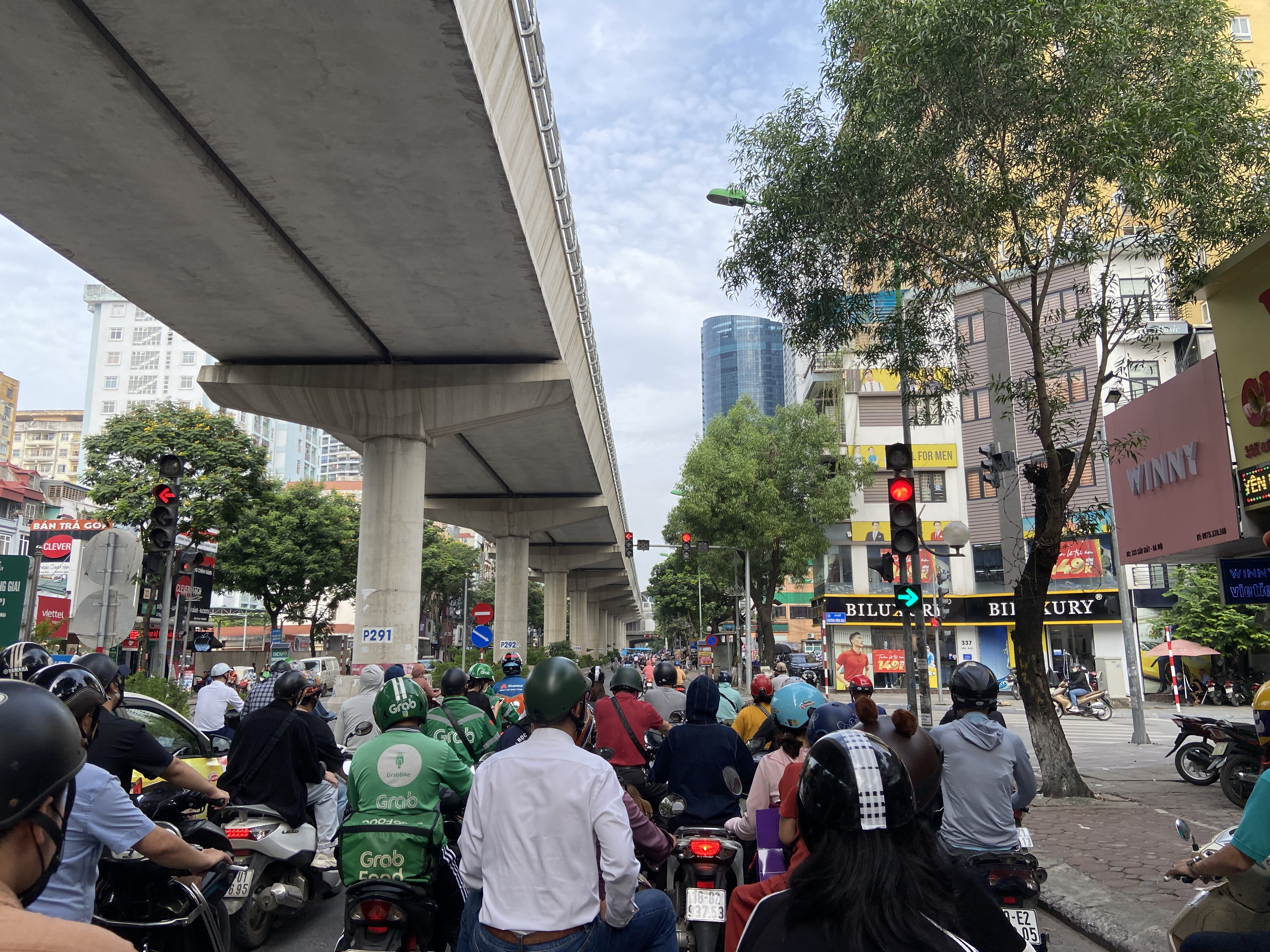
Motorcyclists on the Cầu Giấy Road and the elevated Hanoi Metro Line 3

The historic Paper Bridge now become part of a large two-way Cầu Giấy Road, going from east to west, leading towards National Route 32. There are three major roads perpendicular to Cầu Giấy Road that goes from north to south: Ringway 2, 2.5 and 3. As of 2022, there are 8 bridges that cross the Tô Lịch river at the border of Cầu Giấy. These bridges are: T11 Bridge, Dịch Vọng Bridge, Paper Bridge (Cầu Giấy Bridge), Yên Hoà Bridge, Cót Bridge, 361 Bridge, Trung Hoà Bridge and Hoà Mục Bridge.

In the past, village houses in Cầu Giấy were evenly spaced out with personal green space. However, after urbanization, they transformed into densely populated areas with subdivided land from the green spaces. This led to residential "streets" in historical villages that are practically twisting alleyways, 1–1.5 meters wide, sandwiched against slender tube houses. This led to a very dangerous fire hazard as fire trucks cannot go inside the alleyways, exemplified by a 2024 apartment fire at an alley of Trung Kính Street that killed fourteen people.

Like Hanoi, most of Cầu Giấy residents travel on motorbikes (more accurately moped) or cars. There is a severe lack of public parking spaces to the point that parking vehicles on the sidewalk became a norm. The district has an extensive bus system provided by the Hanoi's government but only has one metro line in operation, Line 3, which partially opened in August 2024. Hanoi's first dedicated shared-use path is at the border of Cầu Giấy, near Tô Lịch River, but it remains unpopular among residents due to pollution.
