= 2023 Hanoi building fire =

Fatal blaze in Vietnam

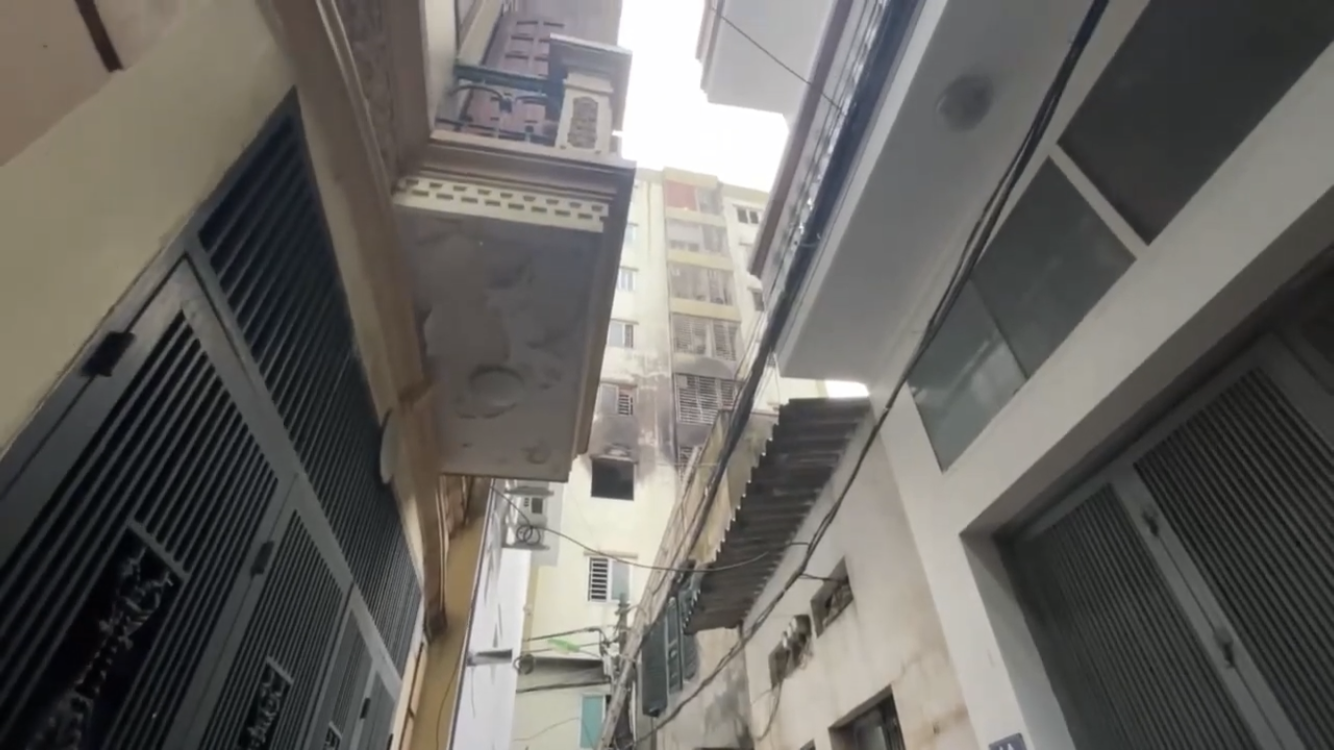
- The apartment after the fire was extinguished
- Native name: Vụ hỏa hoạn chung cư mini ngõ Khương Hạ năm 2023
- Date: 12 September 2023; 2 years ago
- Time: c. 23:00 ICT (UTC+07:00)
- Location: Alley 29 Khương Hạ, Khương Đình, Thanh Xuân district, Hanoi, Vietnam (now 29 Khương Hạ Lane, Khương Đình Ward, Hanoi, Vietnam); 20°59′16.6″N 105°48′55.8″E
- Type: Conflagration
- Cause: Battery short-circuit
- Deaths: 56
- Injuries: 37
- Arrests: Nghiêm Quang Minh; 7 former Thanh Xuân district's officials
- Charges: Fire safety violations Illegal construction Irresponsibility
- Verdict: Guilty to all charges

On 12 September 2023, at around 23:30 ICT (UTC+07:00), a fire occurred in a nine-story microapartment building in the 29th alley of Khương Hạ street, Khương Đình ward, Thanh Xuân district, Hanoi, Vietnam. Of the approximately 150 people residing in the building, 56 were killed by the fire and 37 others were injured. It was the deadliest residential fire in Vietnam since the 2002 Ho Chi Minh City ITC fire.

== Fire ==
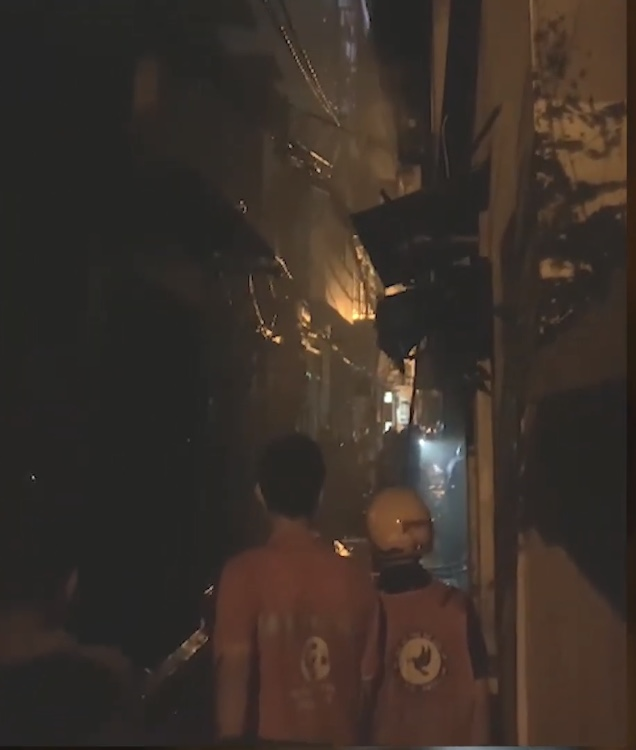
The building on fire

The fire started around 23:30 ICT on the first floor of the nine-story building in a residential area southwest of Hanoi. The building housed more than 150 people.

A woman who lived near the apartment said "The apartment is so closed with no escape route, impossible for the victims to get out." She said that she heard many people screaming for help, but wasn't able to provide assistance due to the severity of the fire.

The fire was difficult to extinguish due to the building being located within a narrow alley, forcing the fire trucks to park hundreds of meters away.

At 00:15 on 13 September, fire rescue workers gained access to several lower-level rooms. They rescued two infants and three adults who were found unconscious. All victims were transported to Bạch Mai Hospital, located approximately five kilometers from the scene. By 01:50, the sixth victim, a young child, was also evacuated.

The fire was under control by 01:00. Emergency responders faced difficulties parking their vehicles as the building was located in an alley. Around 50 fire trucks continued pouring water on all sides of the building. The police used rope ladders to enter the building and search for victims.

By 05:00, preliminary statistics indicated that over 70 residents had been rescued, with 54 of them receiving immediate medical attention, while more than 30 people were killed. By 09:00, the Thanh Xuân district authorities confirmed 70 individuals were rescued, with 54 of them being transported for urgent medical care.

== Casualties ==
Ten children were among those killed in the fire. One child was thrown from a high floor in an effort to save them from the flames. Many people were injured after they leaped onto neighboring roofs or jumped from windows to escape the fire. In total, the fire caused 56 deaths and 37 injuries, and over 100 people were rescued. Victims were taken to Hanoi's major hospitals, with most of them suffering from asphyxia or injuries sustained from jumping out of the building.

By 12:00, five major hospitals – Bạch Mai Hospital, Đống Đa Hospital, Hà Đông General Hospital, Hanoi University of Medicine and Pharmacy Hospital, and Post Office Hospital – had received a total of 49 patients. Among them were 10 fatalities from outside the hospital (including four children), four immediately discharged mild cases, and 35 patients for treatment (including seven children). The deceased victims were transferred from the scene to the morgue at Military Hospital 103.

By morning, the director of Bach Mai Hospital Đào Xuân Cơ reported that the hospital was treating 24 patients, including seven pediatric cases. The remaining patients were adults distributed across the Emergency Department (A9), Pediatric Center, and Toxicology Department. More than ten patients were in critical condition, with three in extremely critical condition.

Đống Đa Hospital received five patients, with one fatality occurring prior to arrival. The remaining four patients included three cases transferred to Saint Paul Hospital, which consisted of one individual with a spinal injury from a fall and a mother with two children suffering from smoke inhalation. Consequently, the hospital continues to provide care for one patient who is in stable condition. Additionally, the hospital received three deceased individuals, who were placed in the hospital morgue. In total, there were four fatalities located in the hospital morgue at Đống Đa Hospital, including two children.

== Aftermath ==
On 13 September, the Hanoi People's Committee announced financial support for the victims of the fire. Families of deceased victims would receive 37 million VND (equivalent to 1,600 USD in 2025) each, while those injured would receive 12.4 million VND. In the case of children who perished in the fire, an additional five million VND would be provided from the city's Children's Welfare Fund, and children requiring medical treatment would receive an extra ten million VND. The city also extended assistance to students, workers, and tenants residing in shared apartments, providing 1.5 million VND per person per month for a period of six months. Individuals injured in the fire and undergoing treatment at hospitals would have all their medical expenses covered. Families with school-going children would receive five million VND to purchase school supplies and educational materials.

On 14 September, a minute of silence was observed at a government session for the victims of the fire, as well as the recent flash floods in Lào Cai.

== Investigations ==
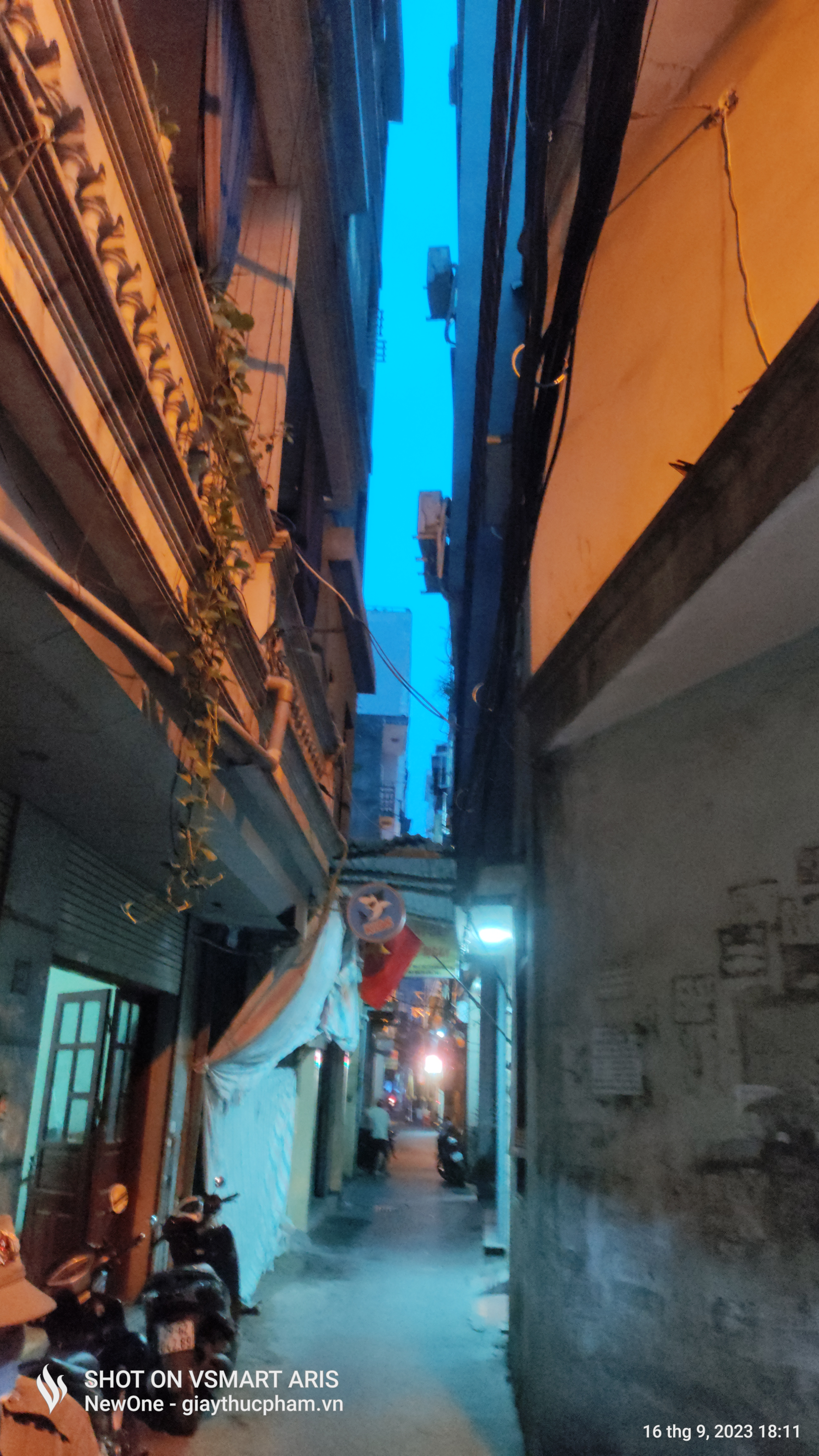
A pathway to the scene of the fire, 16 September 2023. The area surrounding the building itself was cordoned off by Khương Đình authorities following the fire.

According to a building permit granted by Thanh Xuân district in March 2015, the building was only authorized to have six residential floors, but the owner illegally built 10 and divided them into 45 apartments for more business profit.

The owner and landlord of the apartment building, Nghiêm Quang Minh, was arrested and prosecuted on 13 September, 2023 for violating fire safety regulations. An investigation was launched by the police into the cause of the fire. Witnesses stated that the fire had started in the apartment building's garage, which was filled with motorbikes at the time the fire began.

On 19 September 2023, the Hanoi Police Department announced the results of the investigation into the fire's cause, saying that the fire had started at the southern wall of the building, from a short circuit in an electrical wire to the battery of a gas-powered motorbike. The fire then spread to the building's electrical systems and other vehicles on the ground floor.

On March 14th, 2025, the landlord Nghiêm Quang Minh was charged with fire safety violations and illegal construction (by exceeding the number of allowed floors) and was sentenced to 12 years in prison and forced to pay a total of 23.7 billion VND as compensation (equiv. to approx. 920 thousand USD in 2025). Many other former officials of Thanh Xuân district were also convicted and sentenced from a minimum of 30 months to a maximum of 7 years of jail.

== Response ==
=== Domestic ===
Notable Vietnamese government officials, including Prime Minister Phạm Minh Chính and Deputy Prime Minister Trần Lưu Quang, visited the site, as well as the victims who were being treated in nearby hospitals. The prime minister sent his condolences to the families of the victims and stated that the government would cover all treatment costs for those involved. Chính also called for more stringent fire safety measures at small apartments and in highly populated residential areas.

General Secretary of the Communist Party of Vietnam Nguyễn Phú Trọng sent a letter of condolence to the party committee, local government, and residents of Hanoi. Chairman of the Hanoi People's Committee Trần Sỹ Thanh instructed the city to suspend cultural, sports, recreational, and entertainment activities until 17 September, and organize memorial services for the fire's victims.

=== International ===
Leaders from Laos, Venezuela, and Kazakhstan also expressed their condolences to the victims of the fire.

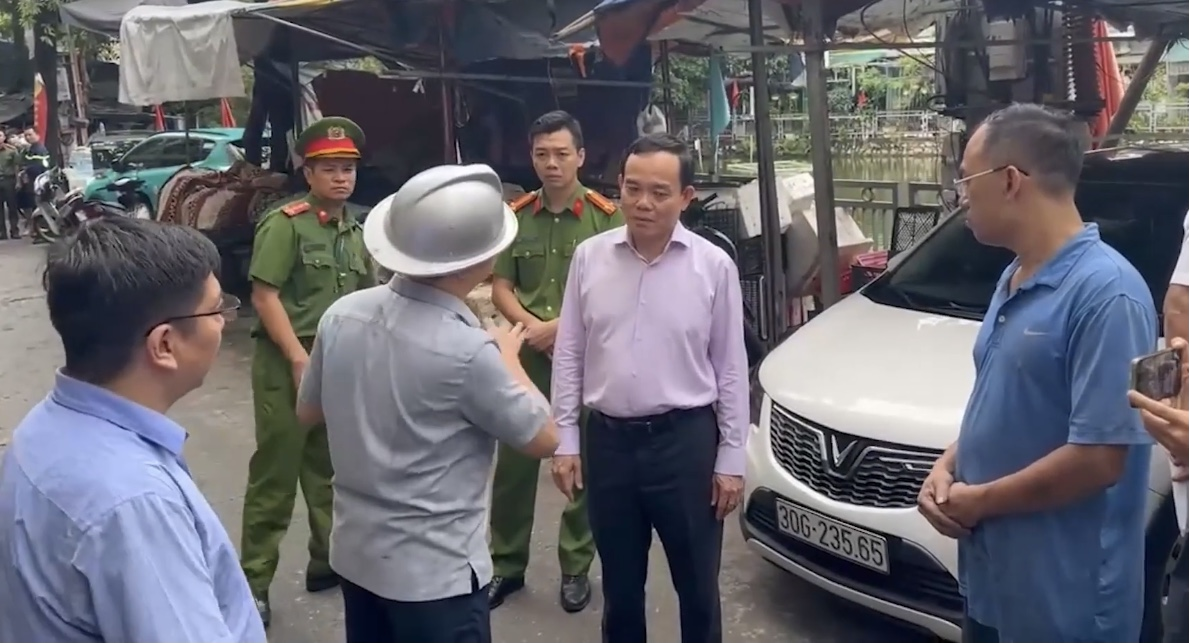
Deputy Prime Minister of Vietnam Trần Lưu Quang visiting the site

== See also ==
- 2022 Binh Duong karaoke bar fire, 2022 building fire in Vietnam
- 2023 Johannesburg building fire, another large residential fire two weeks earlier
