= Tô Lịch River =

Tô Lịch River Sông Tô Lịch
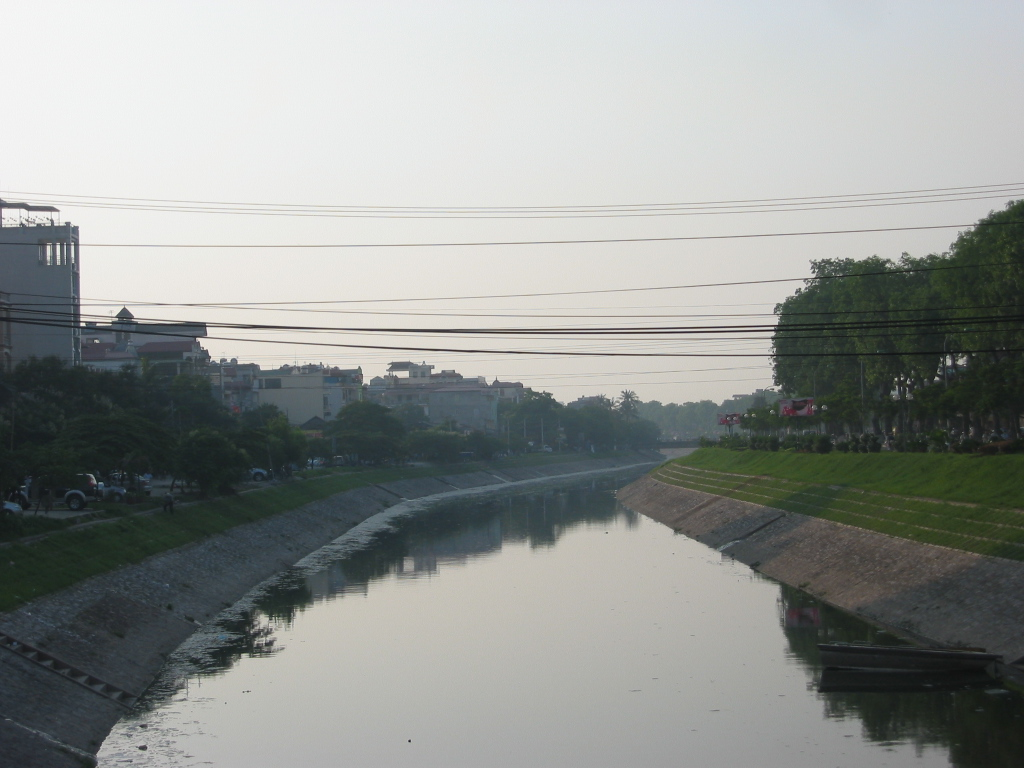
- Tô Lịch River through Cầu Giấy District, Hanoi

Location
- Country: Vietnam
- Region: Hanoi

Physical characteristics
- Source
  - location: Red River
  - elevation: 0 m (0 ft)
- Mouth: Nhuệ River
  - coordinates: 20°57′10″N 105°48′27″E
  - elevation: 0 m (0 ft)
- Length: approx. 14 km (8.7 mi)
- Basin size: 78 km^{2} (30 sq mi)
- Discharge
  - average: 30 m^{3}/s (1,100 cu ft/s)

Basin features
- River system: Tô Lịch River System
- Tributaries
  - left: Kim Ngưu, Lừ
  - right: West Lake

Tô Lịch River (Vietnamese: Sông Tô Lịch) is a small river, flowing in the territory of the Hanoi capital. Mainstream Tô Lịch river flows through the districts Cầu Giấy, Thanh Xuân, Hoàng Mai and Thanh Trì. It is also known as Đại Kim giang (Đại Kim River). Despite its historical significance, the river is currently very polluted and has a pungent smell. It is one of the largest environmental disasters due to Hanoi's urbanization.

== Name ==
The name Tô Lịch River is derived from the name of a god who was living in the Jin dominated the Jiaozhi (Vietnamese: Giao Chỉ). During the Tang dynasty, there was the Imperial Citadel of Thăng Long building.

== History ==
The Tô Lịch river in the past has been a distributary of the Red River, bringing water from upstream of the Red River to the middle of Nhuệ River. Towards the middle, it met West Lake (a remnant of the old Red River, located near Quán Thánh) and water from this lake was provided from there to the downstream. Đại nam nhất thống chí book (composed between the 19th century) wrote:

Tô River in eastern provinces (Hanoi) is a distributary of the Nhị Hà, flowing in the northern provinces to the Hương Bài village's manhole gate, Đông Xuân, Thọ Xương district (the old river gate located in Cầu Gỗ street, Hoàn Kiếm) moves to the western of Vinh Thuan district, to the Nghĩa Đô rural communes and flows to the eastern district of Từ Liêm and Thanh Trì district, nearly 60 miles of winding, flowing into Nhuệ River in Hà Liễu rural communes.

== Features ==
=== Current ===
Currently Tô Lịch River begins in Nghĩa Đô ward, Cầu Giấy District (south of the Hoàng Quốc Việt road), running the same direction as the Bưởi, Láng and Kim Giang road to the south, southwest and then turns to the southeast and flows to Nhuệ River (opposite the village of Hữu Từ, Vĩnh Quỳnh, Thanh Trì).

== Scheme to "clean" Tô Lịch river's water ==
After the historical floods in early November 2008, people in Hanoi have, since then, seen Tô Lịch river's water "clean" as it was in previous years. Before said floods, Tô Lịch river was diluted down the mud and waste by rainwater, rising yards, rolling flow and fishes. That flood had the Tô Lịch river's water cleaned within a few weeks.

In 2009, Hanoi had a scheme: use the Red River's water to wash Tô Lịch river's water. This project is regarded as "sub-scheme" first made the handling of three environmental issues most pressing in the area.
