= Vietnam Museum of Ethnology =

Museum in Hanoi, Vietnam

- Bảo tàng Dân tộc học Việt Nam
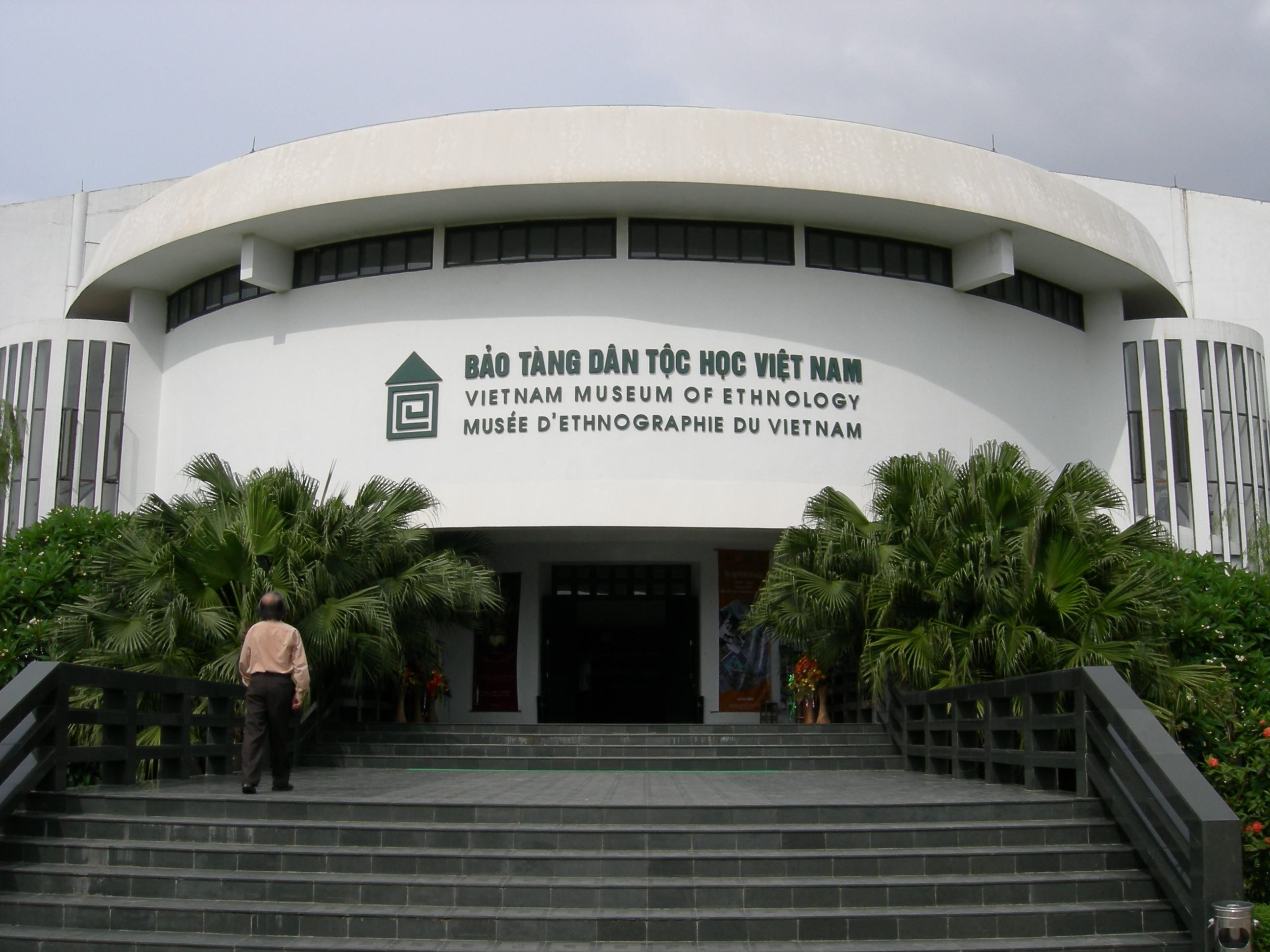
- Entrance to the museum's "Bronze Drum" building
- Established: 12 November 1997
- Location: Nguyễn Văn Huyên Road, Cầu Giấy District, Hanoi, Vietnam
- Coordinates: 21.0406°N 105.7987°E
- Collection size: 30,000 objects
- Visitors: 500,000 annually
- Director: Assoc. Prof. Dr. Bùi Nhật Quang
- Website: vme.org.vn
- Area: 2,000 m^{2} (21,500 sq ft) (permanent exhibition)
- 20,000 m^{2} (215,300 sq ft) (open-air exhibition)

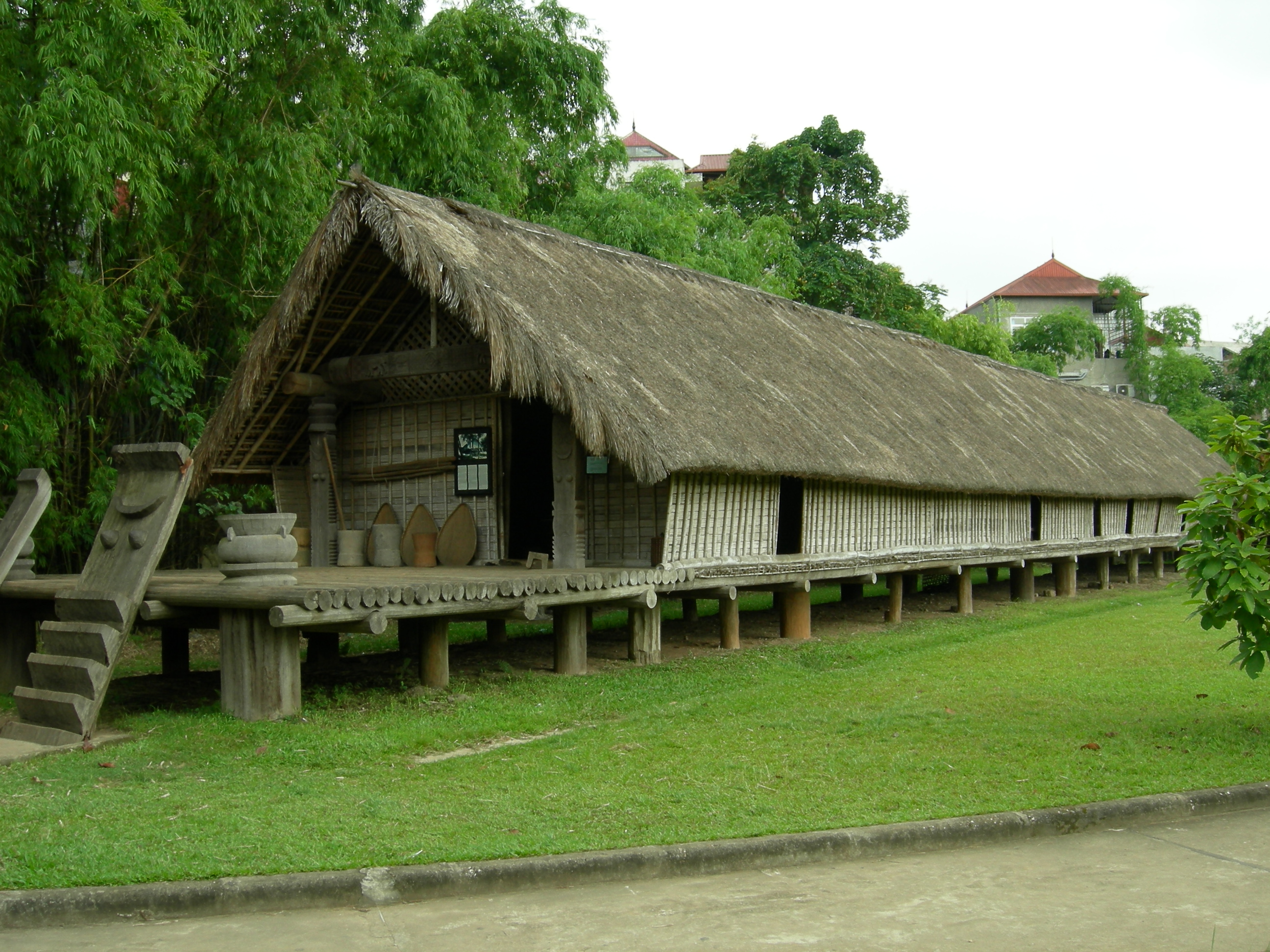
An outdoor exhibit at the museum, consisting of an Ede dwelling from the Central Highland region

The Vietnam Museum of Ethnology (Vietnamese: Bảo tàng Dân tộc học Việt Nam; French: Musée d'ethnographie du Viêt Nam) is a museum in Hanoi, Vietnam, which focuses on the 54 officially recognised ethnic groups in Vietnam. It is located on a 43,799-square-metre (10.823-acre) property in the Cầu Giấy District, about 8 km from the city center. The museum is a member of the Vietnam Academy of Social Sciences, an academic institution of the Vietnamese government.

A second exhibition building was open in 2013 and has a focus on Southeast Asian cultures and peoples.

== History ==
The proposal for the museum was officially approved on 14 December 1987. Construction lasted from 1987 to 1995, and it was opened to the public on 12 November 1997. The budget for construction of the museum was US$1.9 million, with an additional US$285,000 allocated for acquisition of artifacts.

The exhibition building was designed by the architect Ha Duc Linh, a member of the Tày ethnic group, in the shape of a Đông Sơn drum, and the interior architecture was designed by the French architect Véronique Dollfus.

The second exhibition building focusing on Southeast Asian ethnology was designed in a kite shape and was opened in 2013.

== Displays ==
This museum has exhibits, artifacts, and informative resources, all of which shed light on the traditions, customs, and daily routines of the nation's 54 recognized ethnic groups.

The museum's collection comprises more than 15,000 artifacts, 2,190 slides, 42,000 photographs, 237 audiotapes, and 373 videotapes.

== Literature ==
- Lenzi, Iola (2004). Museums of Southeast Asia. Singapore: Archipelago Press. p. 200. ISBN 981-4068-96-9.
