= Korean International School in Hanoi =

- 하노이한국국제학교; Trường Hàn Quốc Hà Nội

Location
- Đường Lê Đức Thọ kéo dài, Mai Dịch, Cầu Giấy, Hà Nội, Việt Nam
- Coordinates: 21.0436646°N 105.77312810000001°E

Information
- Type: Private, international school
- Established: 2006
- Website: hanoischool.net

Korean International School in Hanoi (KISH; Korean: 하노이한국국제학교; Vietnamese: Trường Hàn Quốc Hà Nội) is a Korean international school in Cầu Giấy District, Hanoi, Vietnam.

As of 2016 it had about 1,000 students. It serves elementary school, junior school, and senior school.

== History ==
It opened in 2006. Originally it had 52 students, all in the elementary level.
