= Khương Đình =

Khương Đình Ward Phường Khương Đình Làng Thượng Đình
- Ward (Class-II)
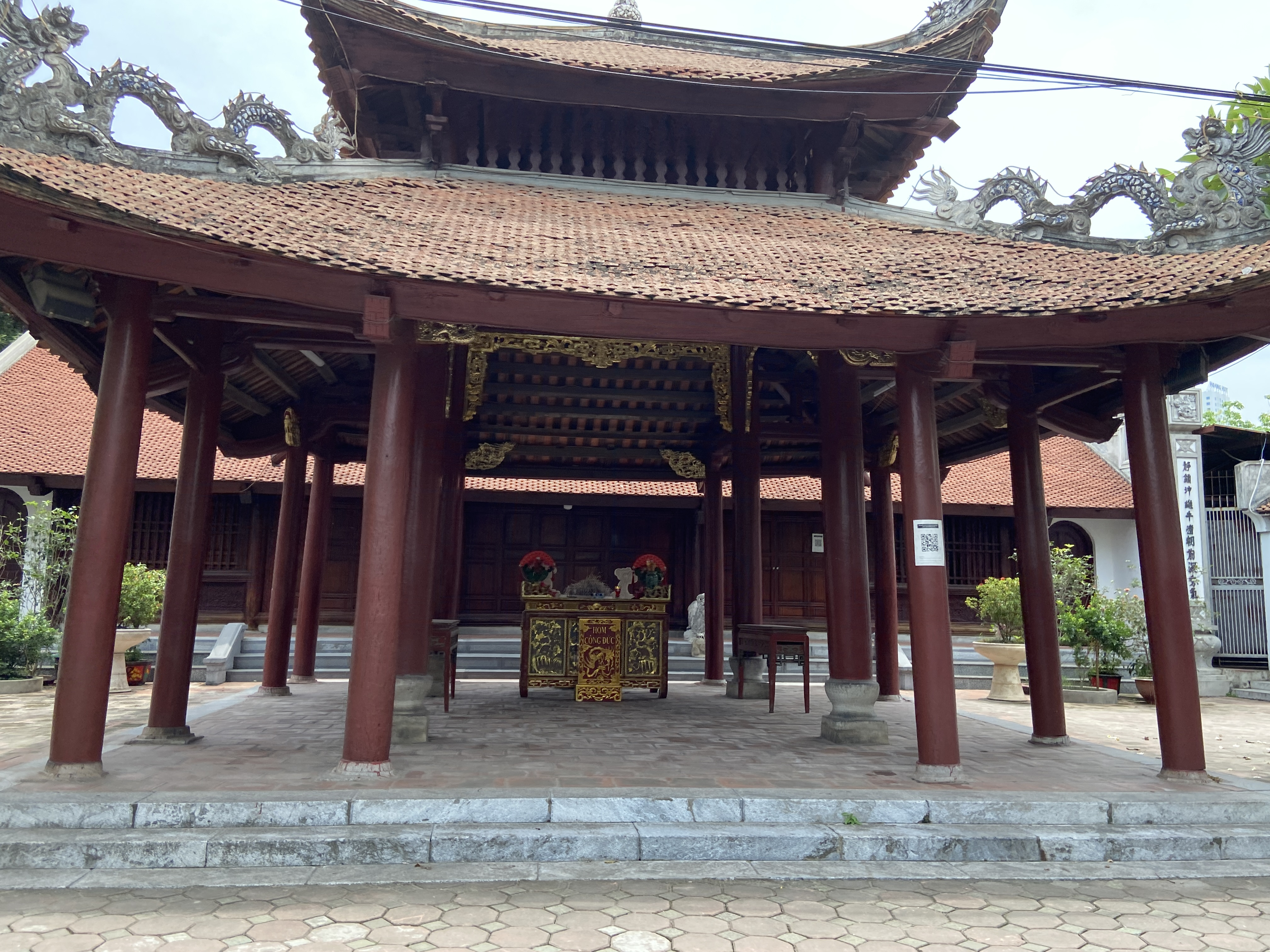
- Relics of Vòng Communal Hall in Khương Đình Street.

- Location in Vietnam
- Coordinates: 20°59′21″N 105°49′5″E
- Country: Vietnam
- Municipality: Hanoi

Population (2022)
  - Total: 31,695
- Time zone: UTC+07:00 (Indochina Time)

Khương Đình is a ward of Hanoi, the capital, in the Red River Delta region of Vietnam.

== History ==
Prior to 1996, Khương Đình was a commune in Thanh Trì district. On 22 November 1996, the commune of Khương Đình was transferred to the newly established Thanh Xuan district and divided into two wards, Hạ Đình and Khương Đình.

On 12 September 2023, the 2023 Hanoi building fire occurred in a nine-story microapartment building located in Khương Đình.

== Geography ==
Khương Đình is bordered by Định Công to the east, Hạ Đình to the west, Kim Giang and Đại Kim to the south, and Khương Trung to the north. The ward has an area of 130.96 hectares (1.31 km2), had a population of 31,695 people in 2022, and a population density of 24,202 people/km^{2}.

=== Streets ===
- Bùi Xương Trạch
- Khương Hạ
- Khương Trung
- Vũ Tông Phan
