= Tube house =

Type of house in Vietnam

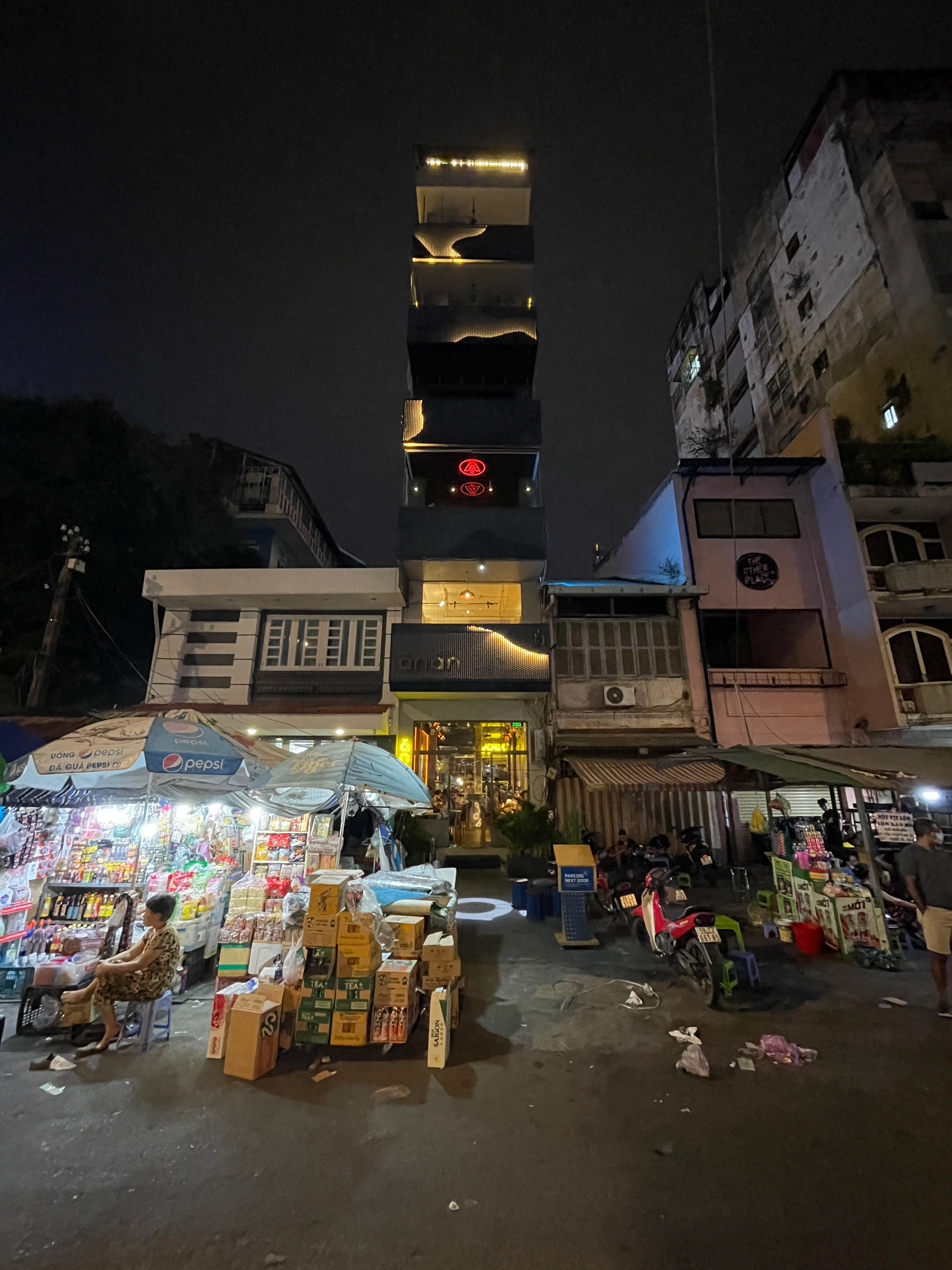
Tube house in old market of District 1, Ho Chi Minh City

Tube houses (Vietnamese: nhà ống) are a vernacular architectural form of shophouse that is native to Vietnam, characterized by their narrow width and multistory structure. Common throughout the country, tube houses have proliferated as a result of limited building space and property taxation policies assessing only the first floor width of homes. In Hanoi, tube houses originated at the end of the 19th century.

== Description ==
Tube houses are narrow towers between three to eight stories tall, and around 4 metres wide and 12 metres deep. Some reach 100 metres in depth. They are often painted in bright colours. A typical tube house is home to a family of four, but in some cases may include multiple generations of relatives. In some cases, several different families cohabitate. Tube houses tend to have a central courtyard which functions as a gathering space.

Vietnamese architects today refer to tube houses as "adjoining houses".

== Origins and prevalence ==
Tube houses are thought to have first appeared in Hanoi the 19th century, when villagers began to move there to sell goods. As density increased, taxes were imposed on street frontage, encouraging people to build inwards and upwards. Tube houses were, as of 2018, described as "the predominant residential structure" in Vietnam's urban areas. Many tube houses in Hanoi's Old Quarter serve a commercial function, with a storefront on the ground floor. In recent years, some tube houses have adopted architectural elements from French colonial architecture, such as cast iron balustrades, louvered windows, or vaulted roofs.

== See also ==
- Row house
- Shophouse
