= Nguyễn Siêu School =

Private school in Hanoi, Vietnam

- Trường Phổ thông liên cấp Nguyễn Siêu (Nguyen Sieu School Inter-level School)

Location
- Mạc Thái Tổ Street, Yên Hòa Ward, Cầu Giấy District, Hanoi; Vietnam
- Coordinates: 21°1′2″N 105°47′24″E

Information
- Former name: Trường Trung học cơ sở và Trung học phổ thông Nguyễn Siêu (1991–2004); Trường Phổ thông dân lập Nguyễn Siêu (2004 – ?)
- Type: Private
- Mottoes: Tiên phong mở lối, Dẫn bước tương lai (In Nguyen Sieu we trust together, leading into the future)
- Established: 11 September 1991 (secondary school)
- Founders: People's Teacher Nguyễn Trọng Vĩnh; Dương Thị Thịnh
- Principal: Nguyễn Thị Minh Thúy
- Staff: 398 (2021)
- Age: 6 to 18
- Enrollment: 2600 (2017)
- Website: nguyensieuschool.edu.vn

Nguyễn Siêu School (Vietnamese: Trường Phổ thông liên cấp Nguyễn Siêu) is a Inter-Levels, Secondary and High School in Hanoi, Vietnam. The school was founded by senior colonel Nguyễn Trọng Vĩnh with his wife, which made it one of the first private schools in Hanoi. It was also known to have a very selective admission process as it has a very high number of applicants, despite its higher than average tuition fee. The school's quality of education has been recognized by numerous Vietnamese branches of government and other organizations.

== History ==
=== Before school establishment ===
Nguyễn Trọng Vĩnh was born in 1935 when Vietnam was a part of French Indochina. At the age of 13, he joined the North Vietnam army as a draftee to the First Indochina War with occupations at the rear side in Hải Phòng. Then, in 1950 he studied at National Campus (Vietnamese: Khu học xá Trung ương) and in 1954, he became the principal of Đông Ngạc School. When the Vietnam War was at its most violent period, in 1965 Vĩnh once again joined the army in the Ministry of National Defense. He retired from the army in 1990 with the rank of senior colonel after 25 years of service.

=== Founding years: 1991 to 2003 ===
Vĩnh along with his wife, Dương Thị Thịnh, on 11 September 1991, founded Nguyễn Siêu Secondary School (Vietnamese: Trường Trung học cơ sở và Trung học phổ thông Nguyễn Siêu) named after Nguyễn Văn Siêu, a 19th-century historian, writer, poet and researcher of the culture of Vietnam. The school at the time lay inside a small gap between Thành Công Secondary School and Thành Công Primary School, therefore Nguyễn Siêu School address were around 44 Area H, Thành Công Ward, Ba Đình District. It was one of the first private schools in Hanoi, meaning it is not fully or partially funded by the government. Two years later, on 31 March 1993, they founded a primary school which is also named Nguyễn Siêu Primary School (Vietnamese: Trường Tiểu học Nguyễn Siêu), behind Thành Công Primary School. Unusual for schools in Hanoi at the time, the secondary school teaches both in the morning and the afternoon, while most schools in Vietnam only teach students in either the morning or the afternoon, depending on their preferences. Although Nguyễn Siêu School has two separate complexes, they were being treated as if they are a single school, meaning a student can study in the same school from grade 1 all the way to grade 12. Because of their limited budget, the school has been moved at least eight times.

=== Relocation to permanent location: 2004 to 2013 ===
In September 2004, Nguyễn Siêu School with government funding moved to a permanent location where it has been allocated a land area of 1 hectare in Yên Hòa Ward at Cầu Giấy District. The school at first only built three single-storey buildings. Later, new buildings in the southeast and northwest were built, as well as building new floors on existing buildings while the completed floors are fully functional and being used. The finished buildings are either five or six storeys tall.

=== Inclusion of international programs and collaborations: from 2014 ===
In 2014, Nguyễn Siêu School is the first school in Vietnam to feature a CAIE secondary course and IGCSE course.

== Buildings and campus ==
=== Notable awards and honors ===
Nguyen Sieu School has received numerous orders from the Vietnamese government and awards primarily from the Ministry of Education and Training as well as from other organisations. Some of them are:

- Two Third class Labor Order and one Second class Labor Order
- Second class National Certified School – the highest tier of Vietnam school assessment system

== Notable alumnae ==
- Đàm Thanh Xuân – Wushu martial artist (class of 2004)
- Phạm Khánh Linh – Rock, electronic and pop music artist (class of 2000)
