= Cốm =

Vietnamese flattened rice dish

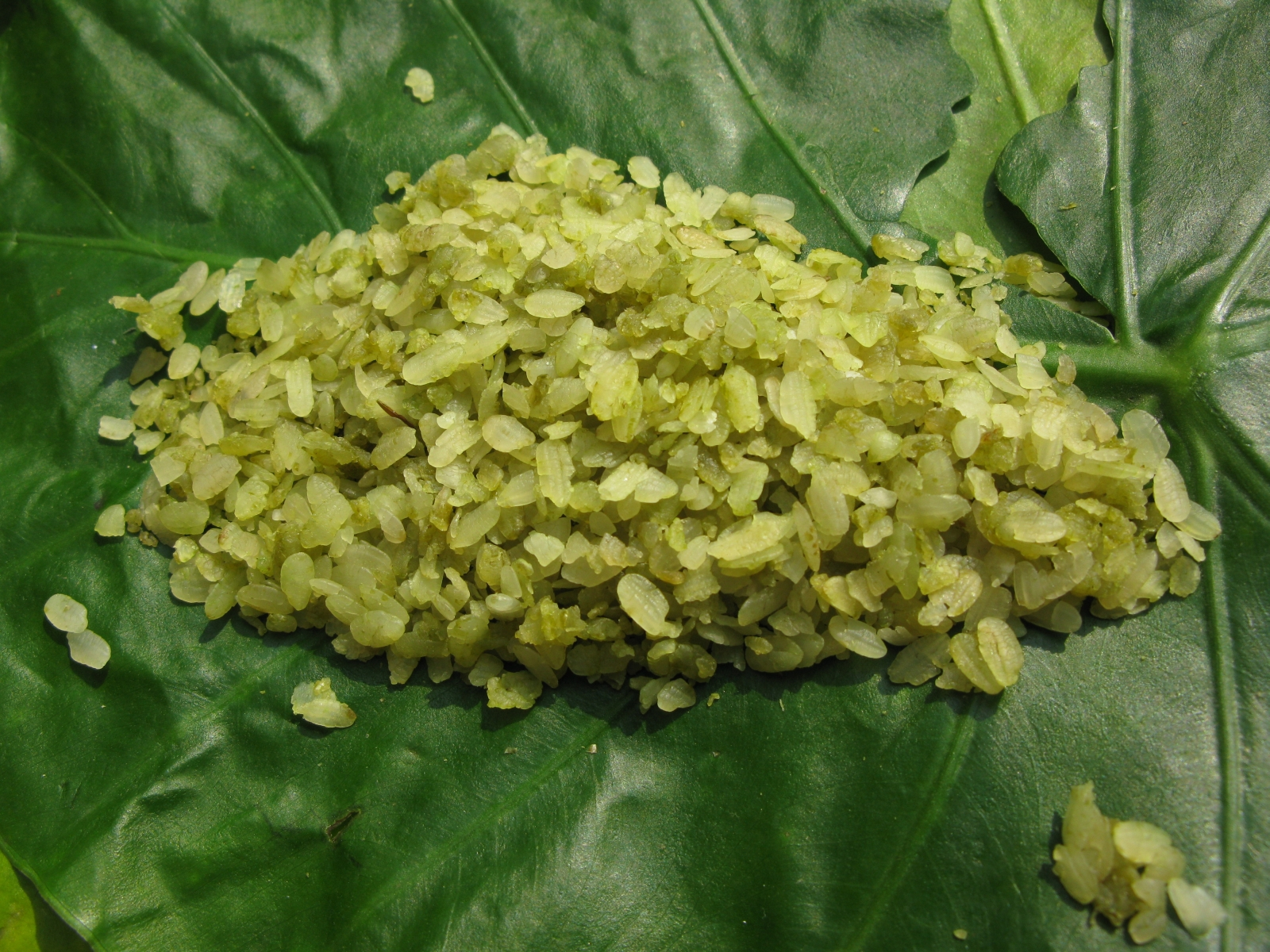
- Course: Dessert
- Place of origin: Vietnam
- Region or state: Hanoi, Red River Delta
- Main ingredients: Rice kernels
- Variations: Cốm

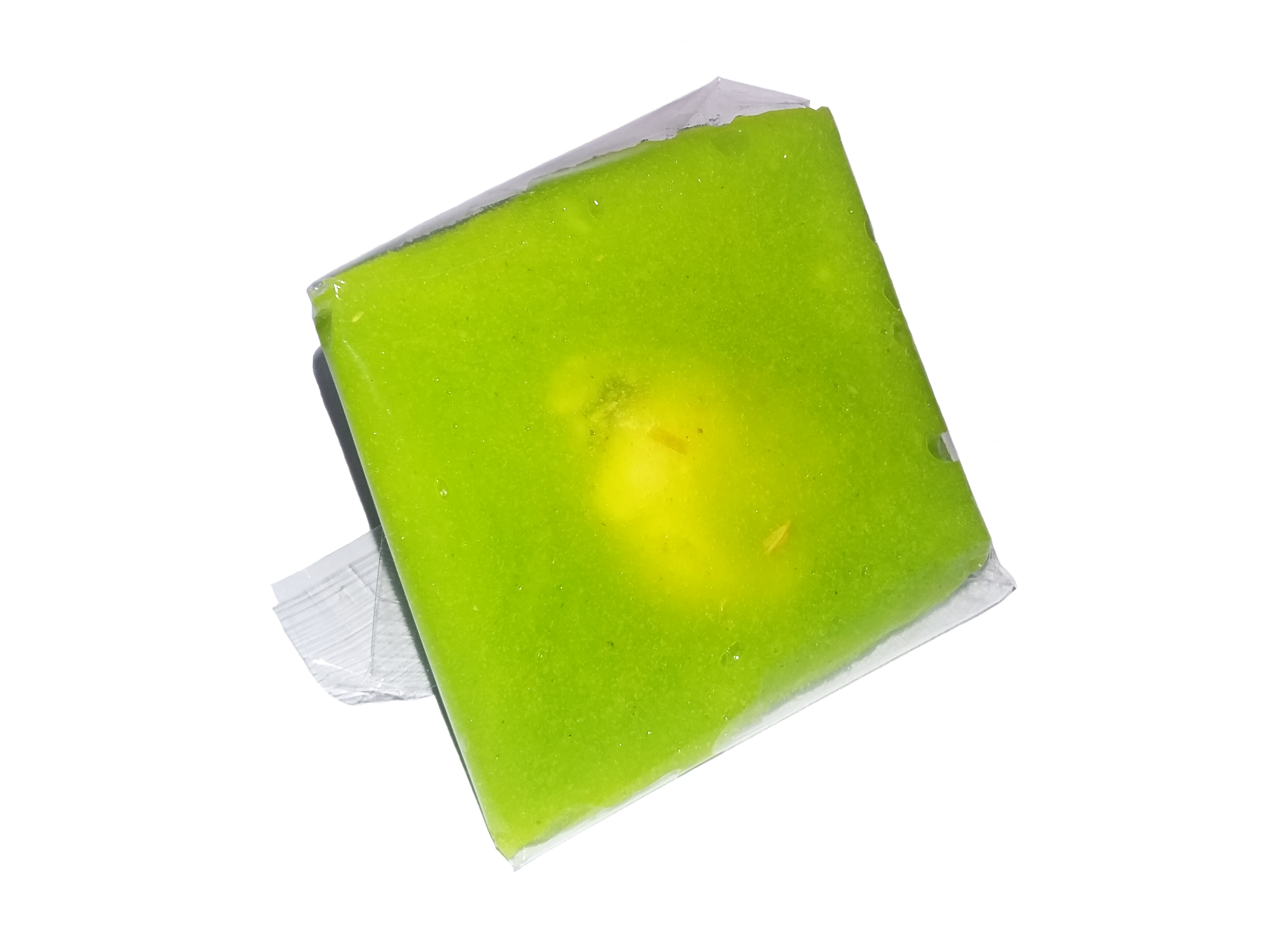
Bánh cốm, with mung bean filling seen through the translucent green pastry

Cốm, or simply called green rice, is a flattened and chewy green rice in Vietnamese cuisine. It is not dyed green, but produced from young rice kernels roasted over very low heat then pounded in a mortar and pestle until flattened. Cốm is a seasonal dish associated with autumn. It can be eaten plain or with coconut shavings. The taste is slightly sweet with a nutty flavor. It is a popular seasonal dessert across Vietnam, especially in Red River Delta cuisine. It is traditionally produced at the Cốm Vòng village in Hanoi.

A traditional pastry, bánh cốm (green rice cake), is made using cốm with mung bean filling. Cốm is often offered to worship ancestors during the Mid-Autumn Festival. It can also be used to make a dessert rice pudding called chè cốm. Cốm can be flattened further for a dish called cốm dẹp among the Khmer people.

== See also ==
- Flattened rice
- Pinipig, a similar dish from the Philippines which uses green glutinous rice grains
- Poha (rice), a similar dish in South Asia which uses mature rice grains
- Rolled oats
