= Thanh Xuân district =

Thanh Xuân district Quận Thanh Xuân
- Urban district
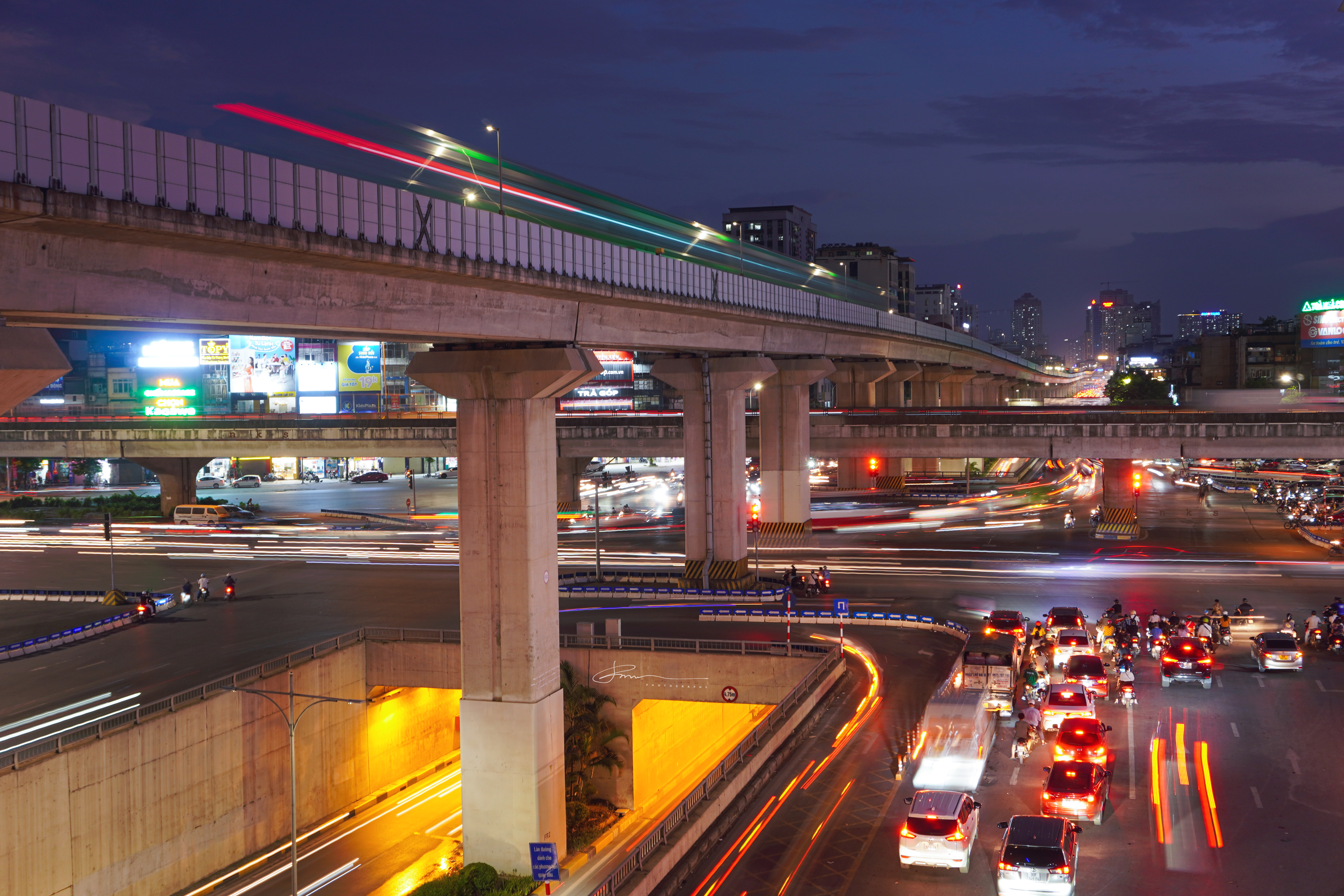
- Thanh Xuan intersection
- Interactive map of Thanh Xuân district
- Country: Vietnam
- Province: Hanoi
- Seat: Thanh Xuân Bắc ward
- Wards: 11 wards

Area
  - Total: 9.09 km^{2} (3.51 sq mi)

Population (2019)
  - Total: 293,524
  - Density: 32,300/km^{2} (83,600/sq mi)
- Time zone: UTC+7 (ICT)
- Area code: 24
- Climate: Cwa
- Website: Official website (in Vietnamese)

Thanh Xuân is an urban district (quận) of Hanoi, the capital city of Vietnam. The district currently has 11 wards, covering a total area of 9.09 square kilometres (3.51 sq mi). As of 2019, there were 293,524 people residing in the district, the population density is 32,000 inhabitants per square kilometer. The district is mostly residential and also contains several universities.

== Geography ==
Thanh Xuân is located at 20° 59′ 36.24″ N, 105° 47′ 54.6″ E, bordered by Đống Đa to the north, Hai Bà Trưng to the east, Hoàng Mai and Thanh Trì to the south, Hà Đông and South Từ Liêm to the southwest, and Cầu Giấy to the northwest.

== Administrative division ==
Thanh Xuân district is divided into 11 wards: Hạ Đình, Khương Đình, Khương Mai, Khương Trung, Kim Giang, Nhân Chính, Phương Liệt, Thanh Xuân Bắc, Thanh Xuân Nam, Thanh Xuân Trung and Thượng Đình.

== Education ==
- VNU University of Science
- VNU University of Social Sciences and Humanities
- Hanoi University
- Hanoi Architectural University
- National University of Art Education
- University Of Transport Technology
- National Academy of Education Management
