= Đống Đa district =

Dong Da district Quận Đống Đa
- Urban district
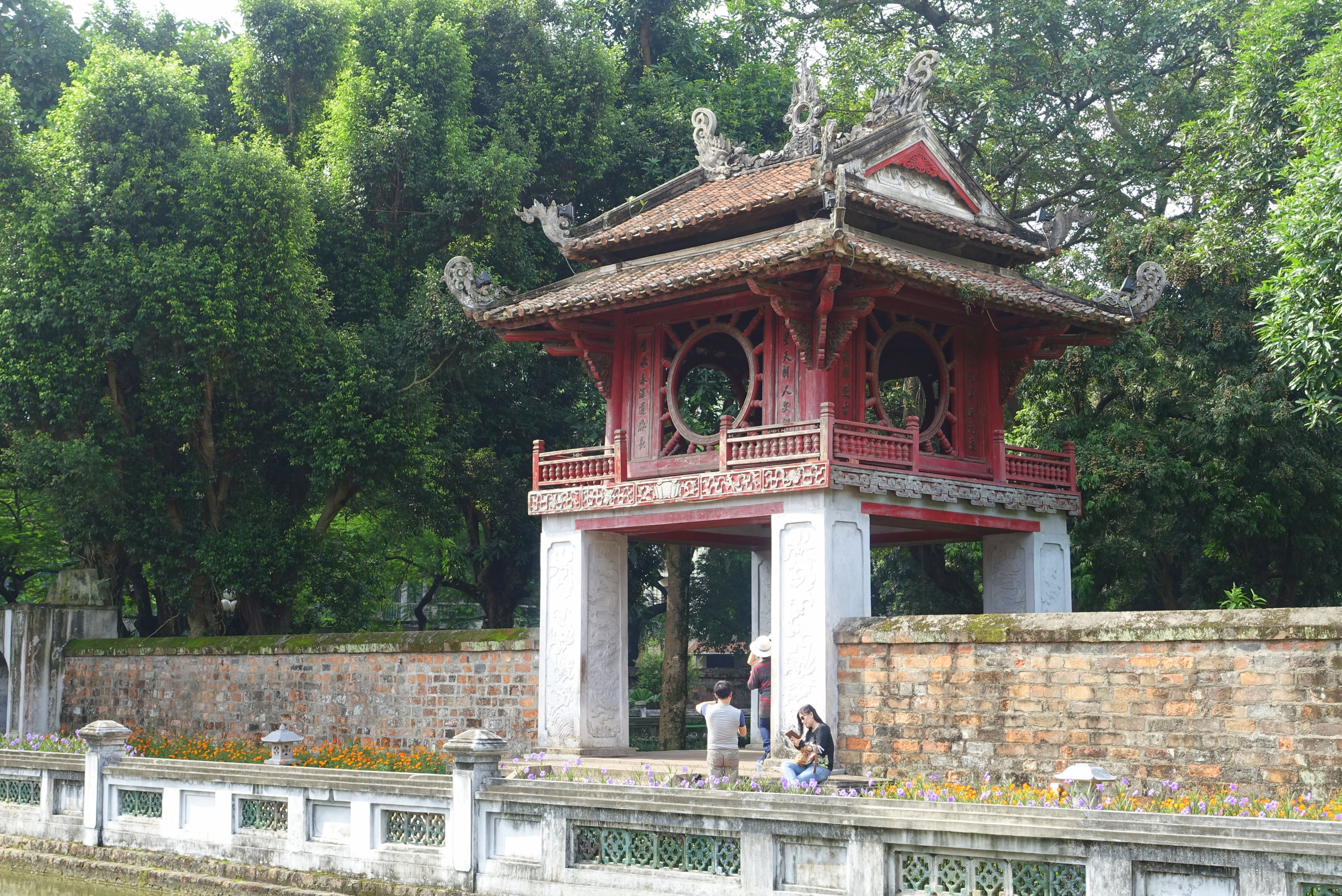
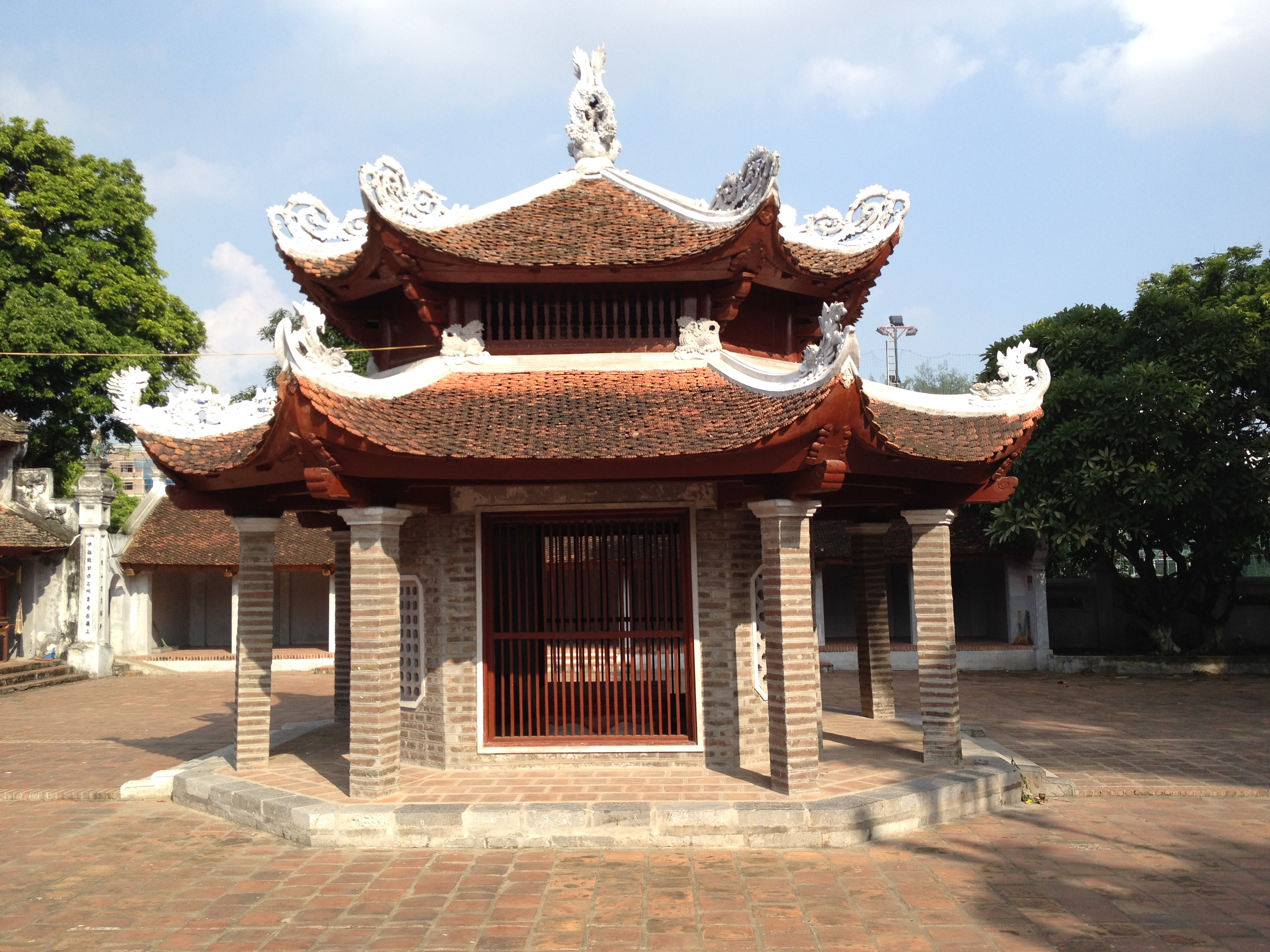
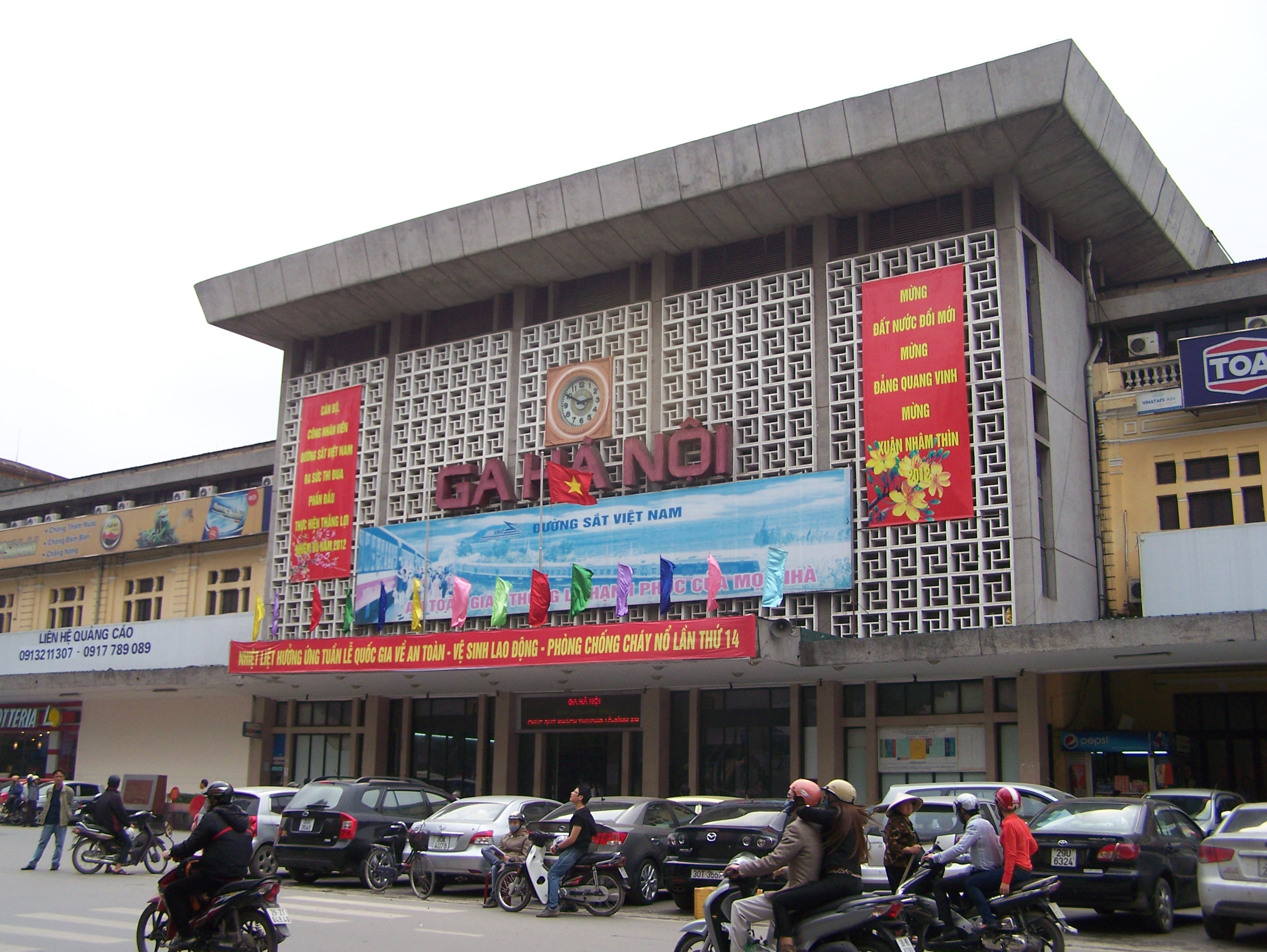
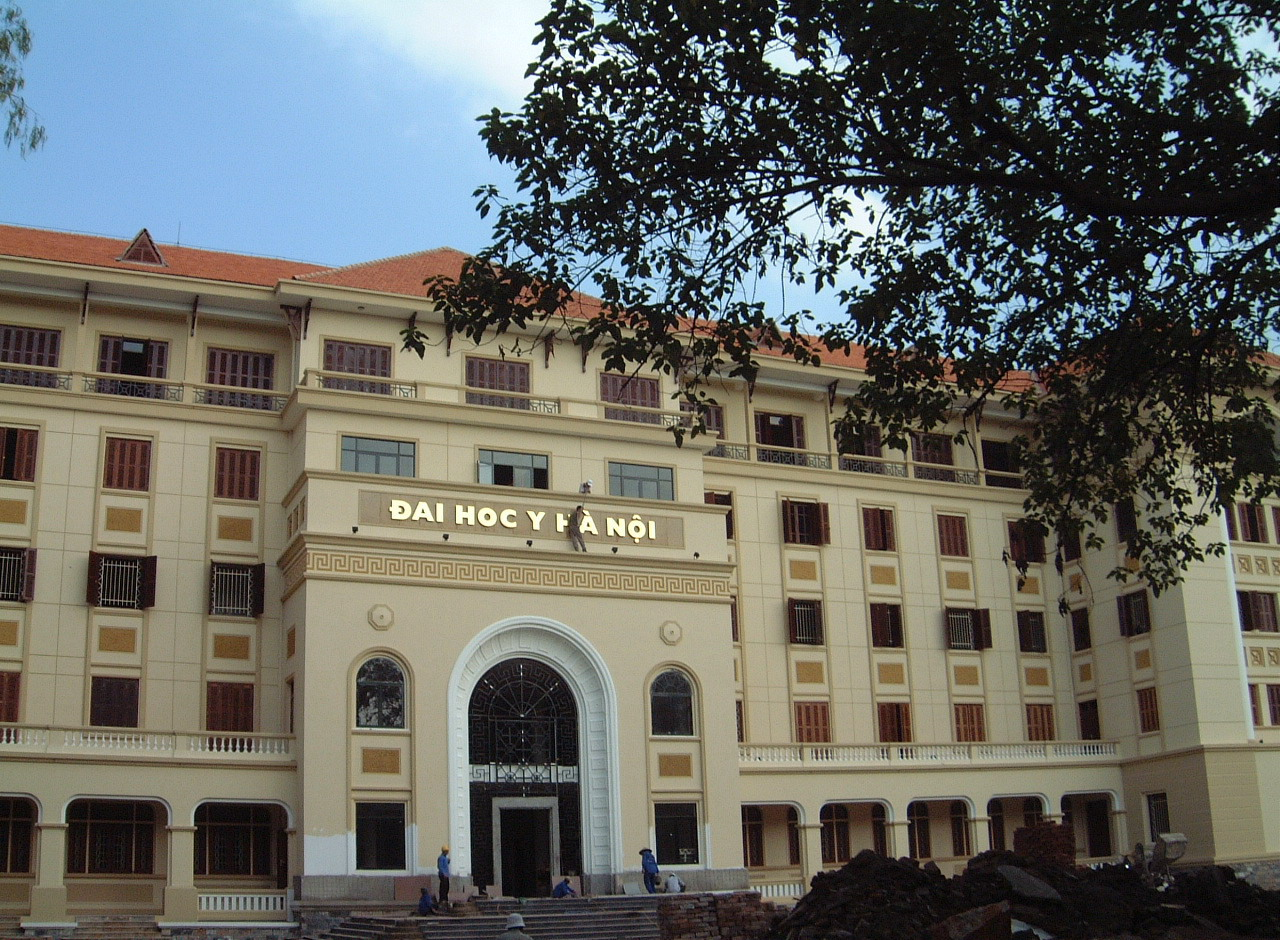
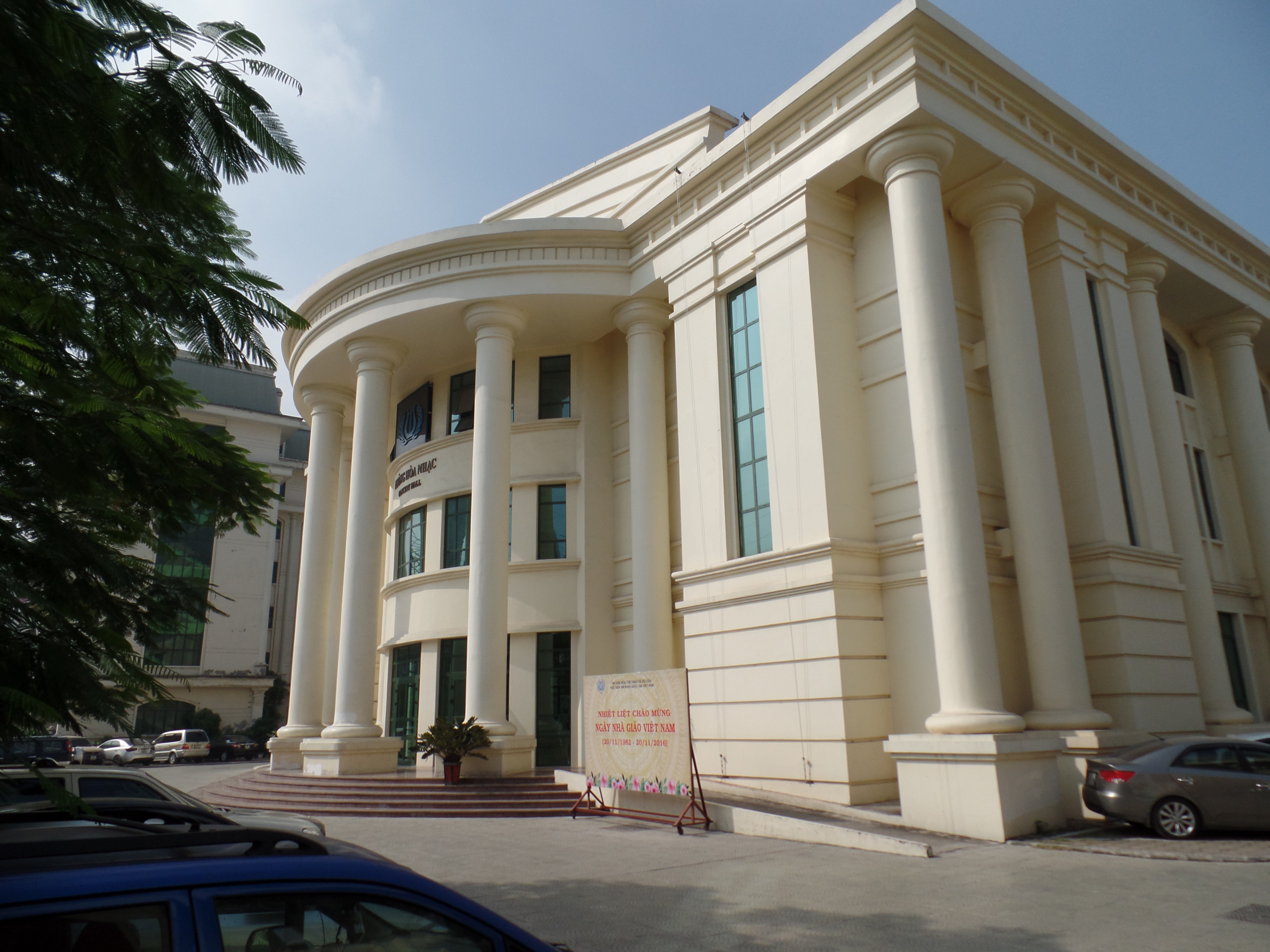
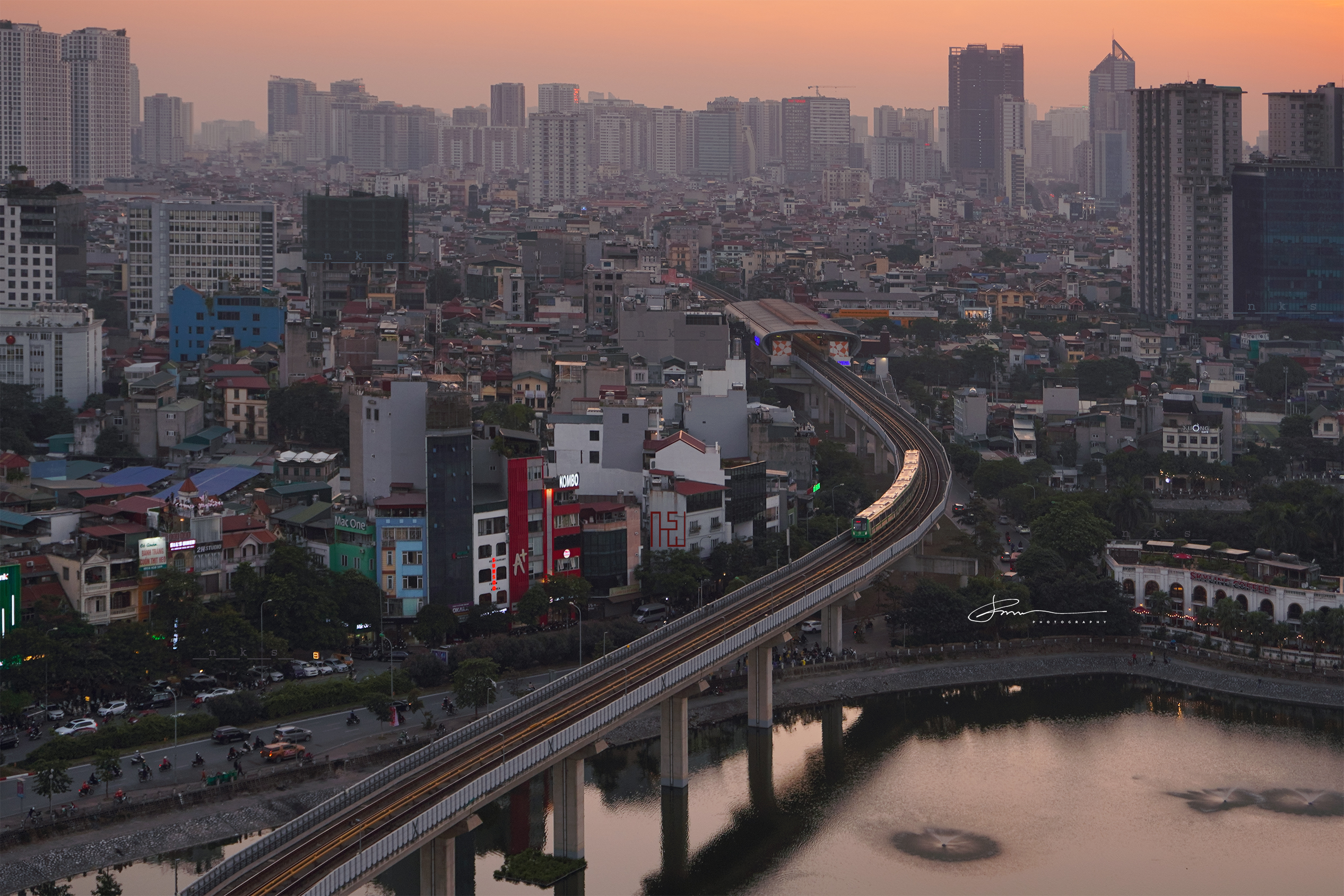
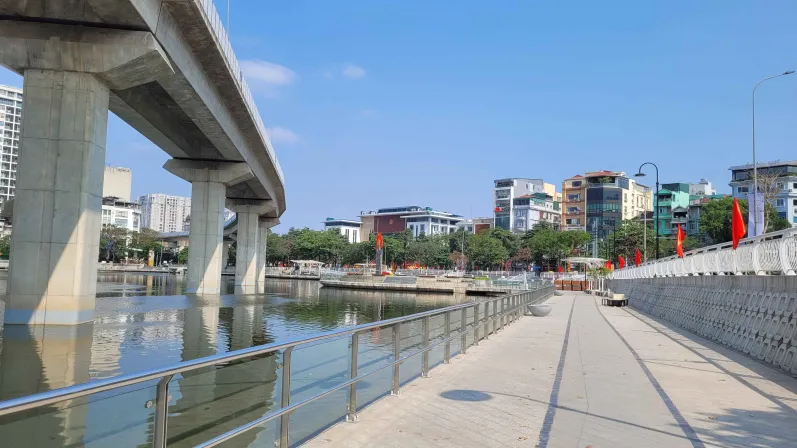
- Temple of Literature Láng Temple Hanoi railway station Hanoi Medical University Vietnam National Academy of Music Hanoi Metro Line 2A over Hoàng Cầu Lake View of Hoàng Cầu Lake (2026)
- Interactive map of Dong Da district
- Coordinates: 21°00′49″N 105°49′36″E
- Country: Vietnam
- Region: Red River Delta
- Province: Hanoi
- Seat: Ô Chợ Dừa ward
- Wards: 21 wards

Government
  - Secretary of the Party: Hà Minh Hải
  - Chairman of People's Council: Nguyễn Anh Cường
  - Chairman of People's Committee: Đặng Việt Quân

Area
  - Total: 9.95 km^{2} (3.84 sq mi)

Population
  - Total: 420,900
  - Density: 42,302/km^{2} (109,560/sq mi)
- Time zone: UTC+7 (ICT)
- Postal code: 11500
- Area code: 24
- Climate: Cwa
- Website: dongda.hanoi.gov.vn

Đống Đa (lit. 'Banyan Heap'; Vietnamese pronunciation:[ɗəwŋ˧˥ ɗaː˧˧]) is a former urban district (quận) of Hanoi, the capital city of Vietnam. It is bordered by Ba Đình to the north, Hoàn Kiếm to the northeast, Hai Bà Trưng to the east, Thanh Xuân to the south, and Cầu Giấy to the west. The district currently has 21 wards, covering a total area of 9.95 square kilometres (3.84 sq mi). It is the most populous district in Hanoi. As of 2017, there were 420,900 people residing in the district, the population density is 42302 inhabitants per square kilometer, 18 times higher than the overall density of Hanoi. Dong Da district is home to various enterprises and many of Vietnam's most prestigious universities such as Hanoi Medical University, Foreign Trade University, University of Transport and Communications, Thuyloi University.

Dong Da district has a large number of monuments and relics, including Temple of Literature (Văn Miếu), a cultural symbol of the city. The district is also where the Battle of Ngọc Hồi-Đống Đa between Tây Sơn dynasty and the Qing dynasty, one of the greatest victories in Vietnamese military history, ended.

== Geography ==
Đống Đa is located at 21°00' North, 105°49' East, in the center of Hanoi. The district covers an area of 9.95 km^{2} (3.8 sq mi), bordered by Ba Đình to the north, Hoàn Kiếm to the northeast, Hai Bà Trưng to the east, Thanh Xuân to the south, and Cầu Giấy to the west. Of the land in Đống Đa, 5.00 km^{2} (1.93 sq mi), or 50.3% is specially used land, while 4.36 km^{2} (1.68 sq mi), or 43.8%, is used for residential purposes.

Đống Đa has relatively flat terrain, with only a few small mounds in the eastern parts, including Đống Đa Mound.

=== Lakes ===
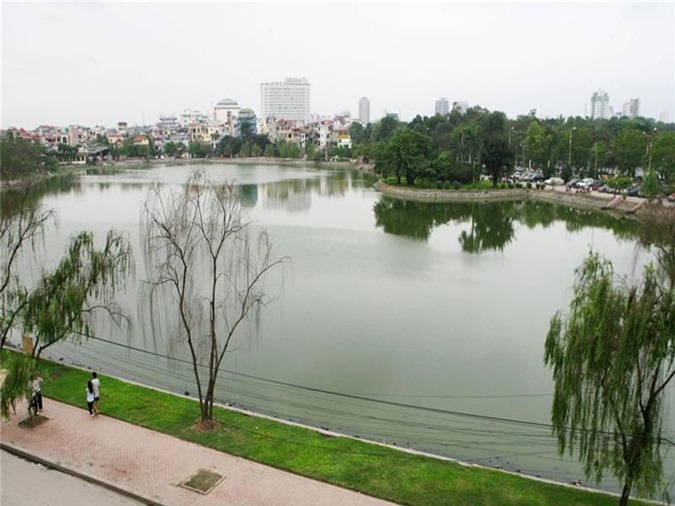
Ba Mau Lake

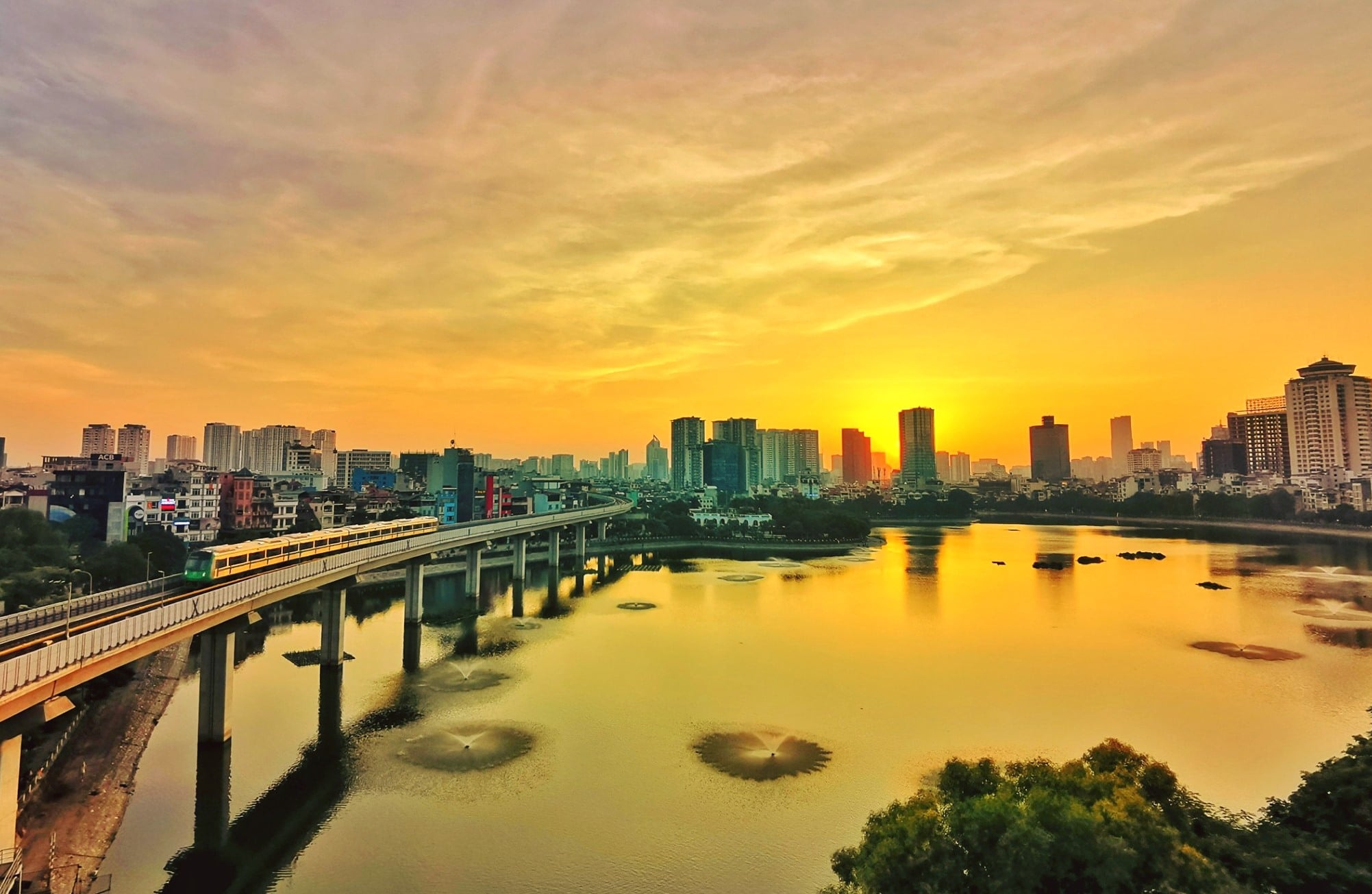
Dong Da Lake

There are several large lakes such as Ba Mau lake, Kim Lien lake, Xa Dan lake, Dong Da lake, Van Chuong lake. In the past, there used to be many ponds and lagoons; however; but due to social-economic development and urbanization, the number of them has been reduced, with many being filled or polluted.

- Ba Mau Lake
- Dong Da Lake
- Hao Nam Lake, near Cat Linh station of Hanoi Metro Line 2A
- Nam Dong Lake
- Van Chuong Lake
- Linh Quang Lake
- Khuong Thuong Lake
- Ho Me Lake, located at the corner of the street Ton That Tung - Truong Chinh, next to the Hanoi Medical University
- Lang Lake
- Kim Lien Lake

== Administrative divisions ==
The district is divided into 21 wards (phường).

- Văn Miếu
- Quốc Tử Giám
- Hàng Bột
- Nam Đồng
- Trung Liệt
- Khâm Thiên
- Phương Liên
- Phương Mai
- Khương Thượng
- Ngã Tư Sở
- Láng Thượng
- Cát Linh
- Văn Chương
- Ô Chợ Dừa
- Quang Trung
- Thổ Quan
- Trung Phụng
- Kim Liên
- Trung Tự
- Thịnh Quang
- Láng Hạ

== Economy ==
As of 2015, there are 11169 acting enterprises, cooperatives, and 11133 non-farm individual business establishments in the district. Several of Vietnam's largest companies, such as Petrolimex, Vinacomin, Vietnam Posts and Telecommunications Group, Vietnam Steel Corporation and VPBank, are headquartered in this district.

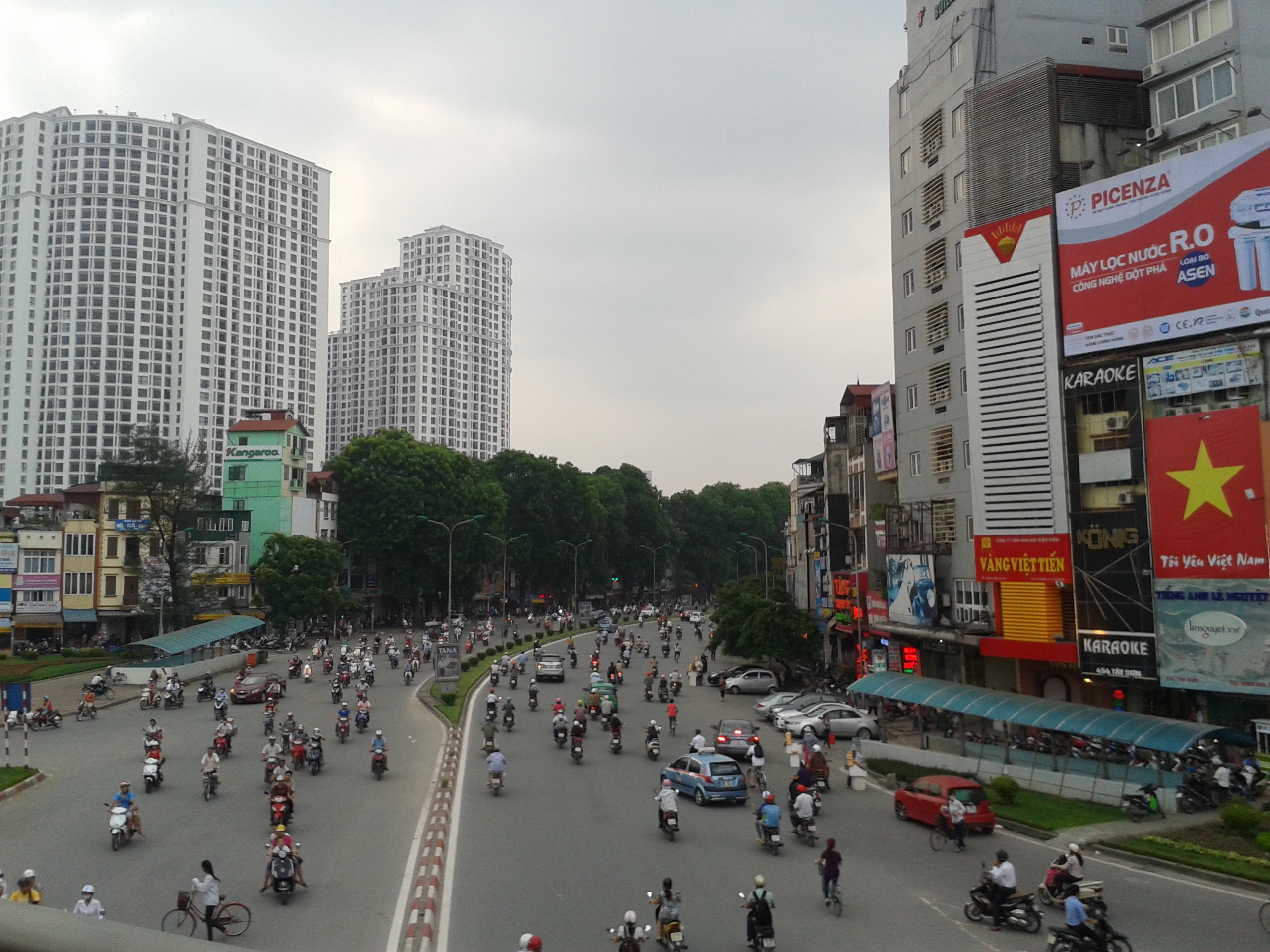
Lang Road

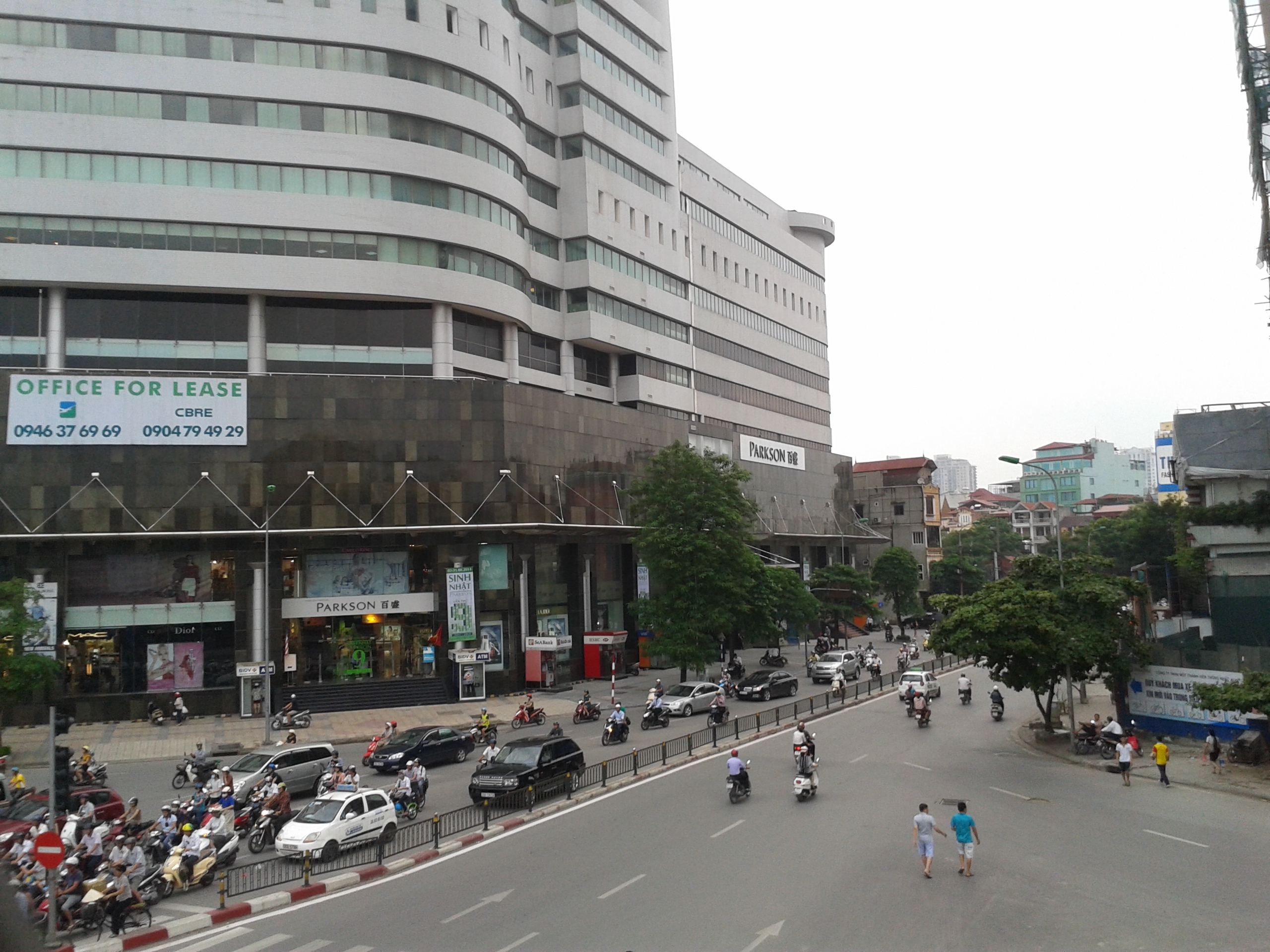
Thai Ha Street

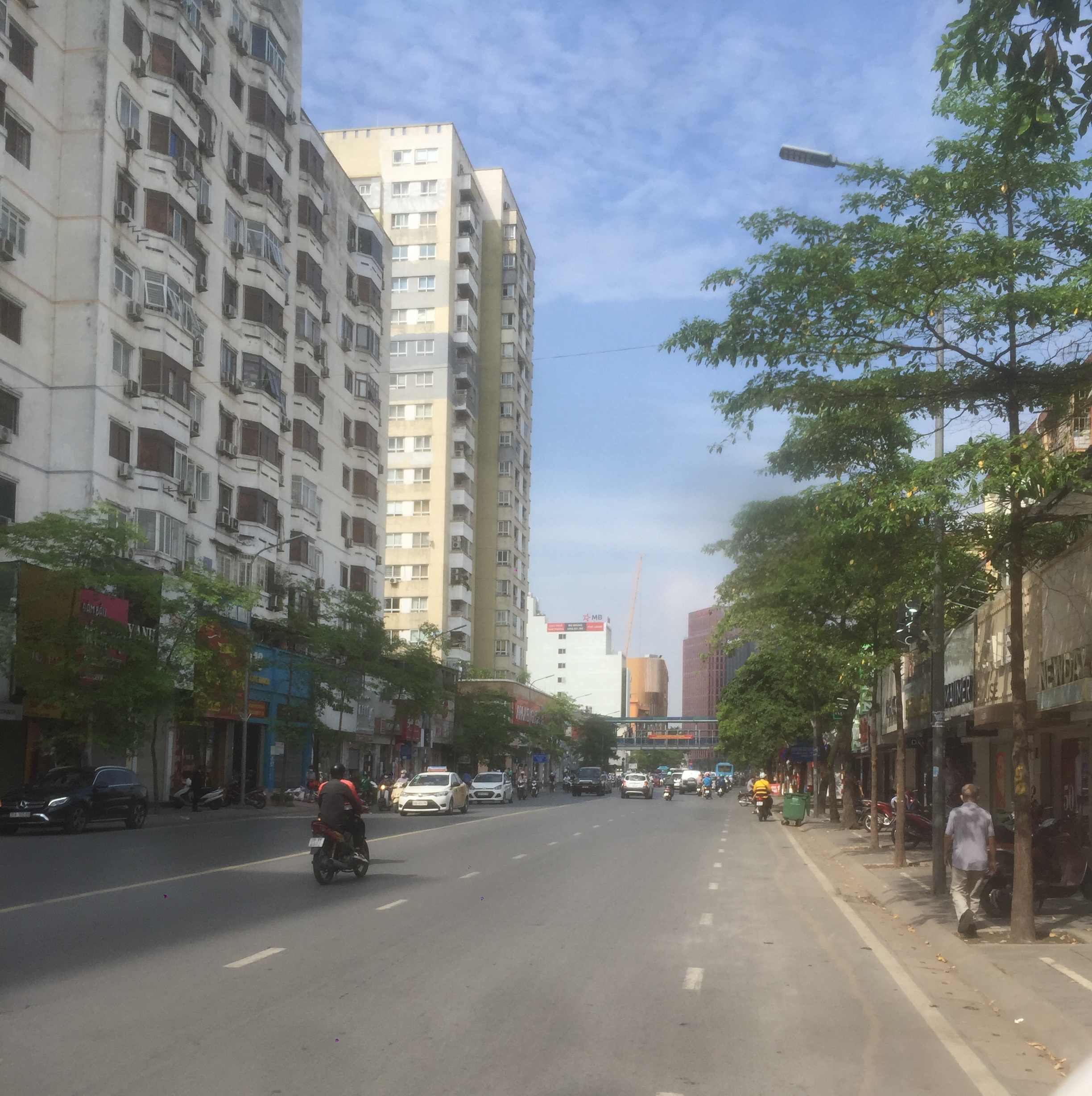
Pham Ngoc Thach Street

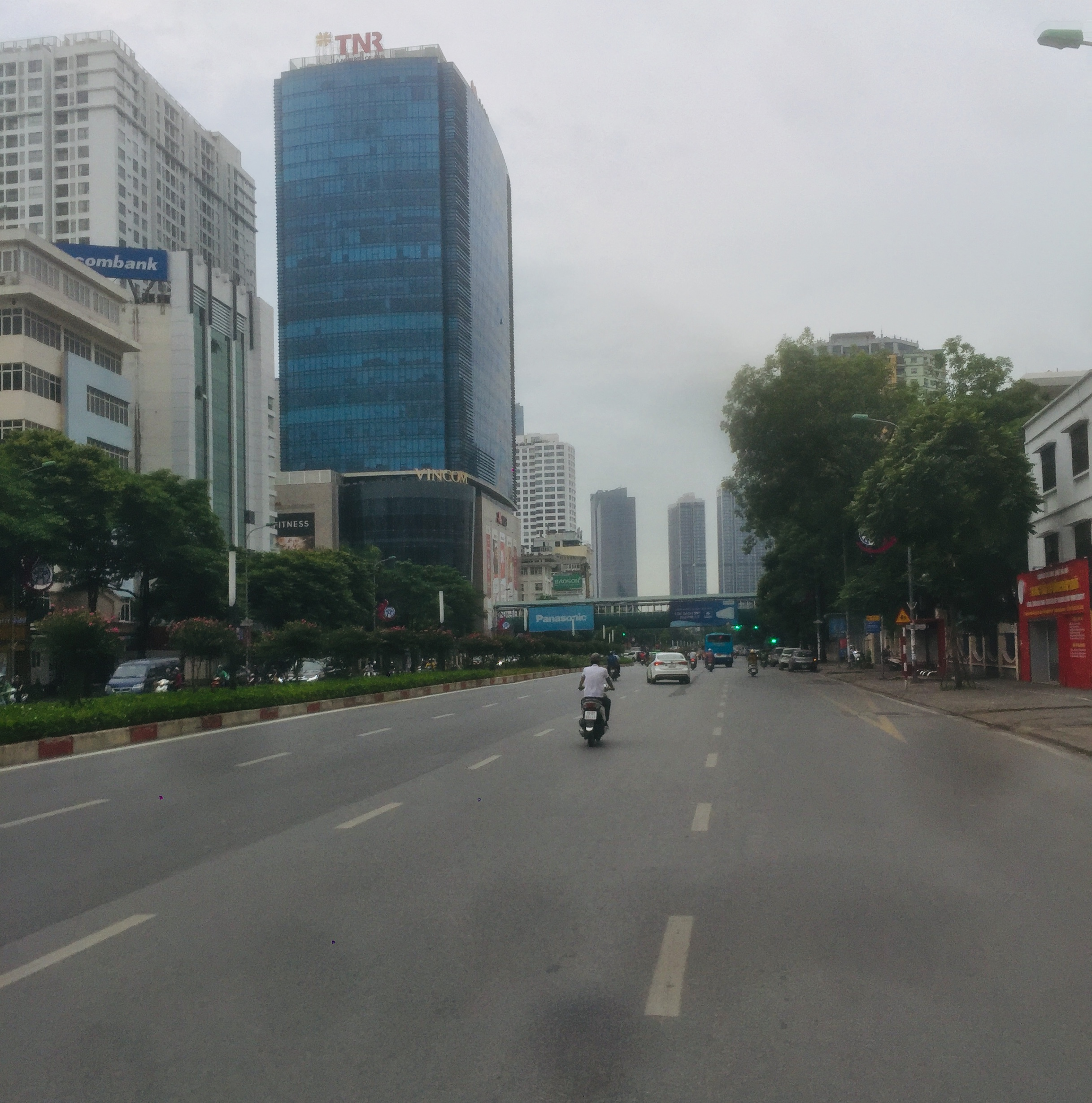
Nguyen Chi Thanh Street

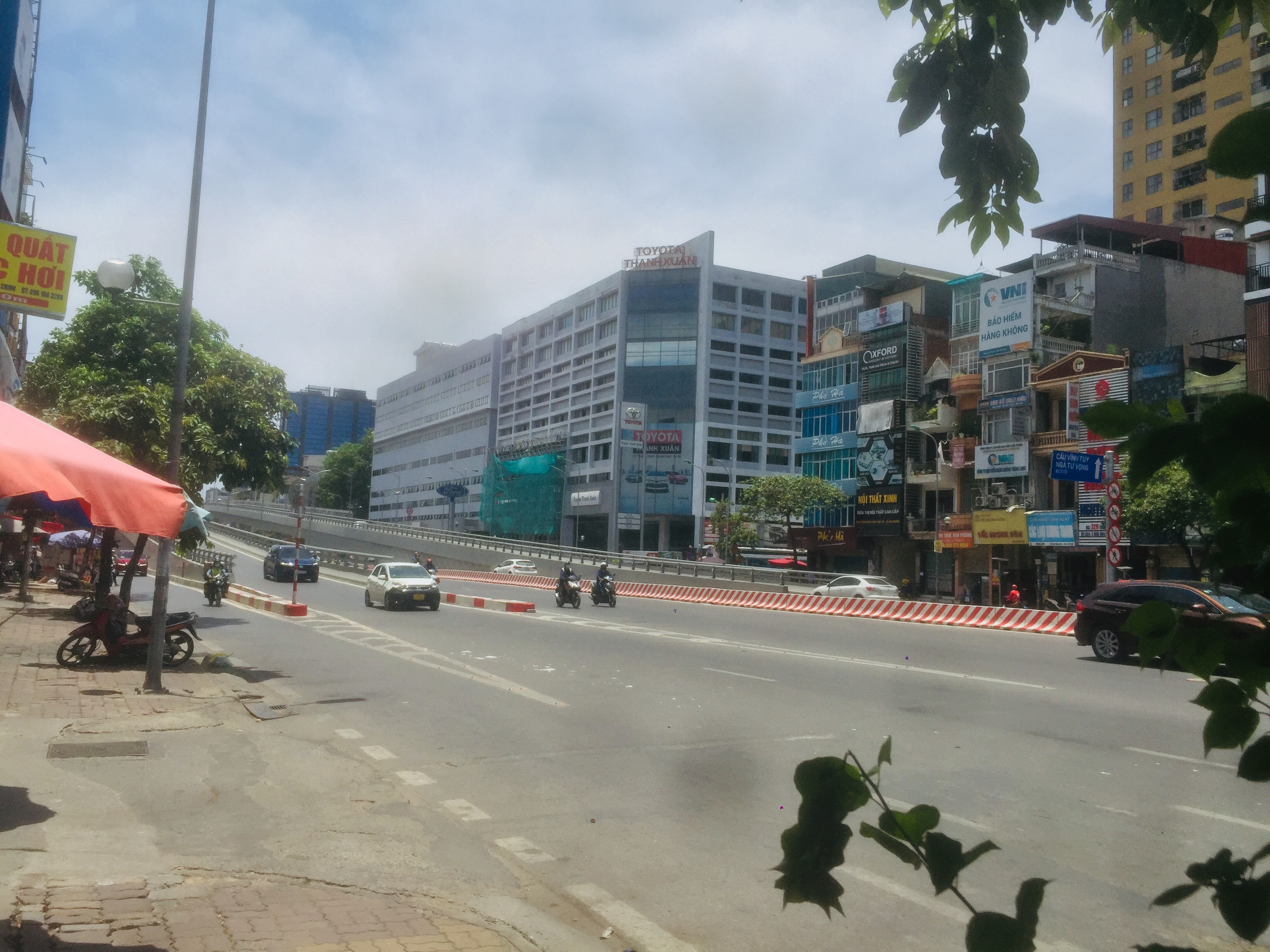
Truong Chinh Street

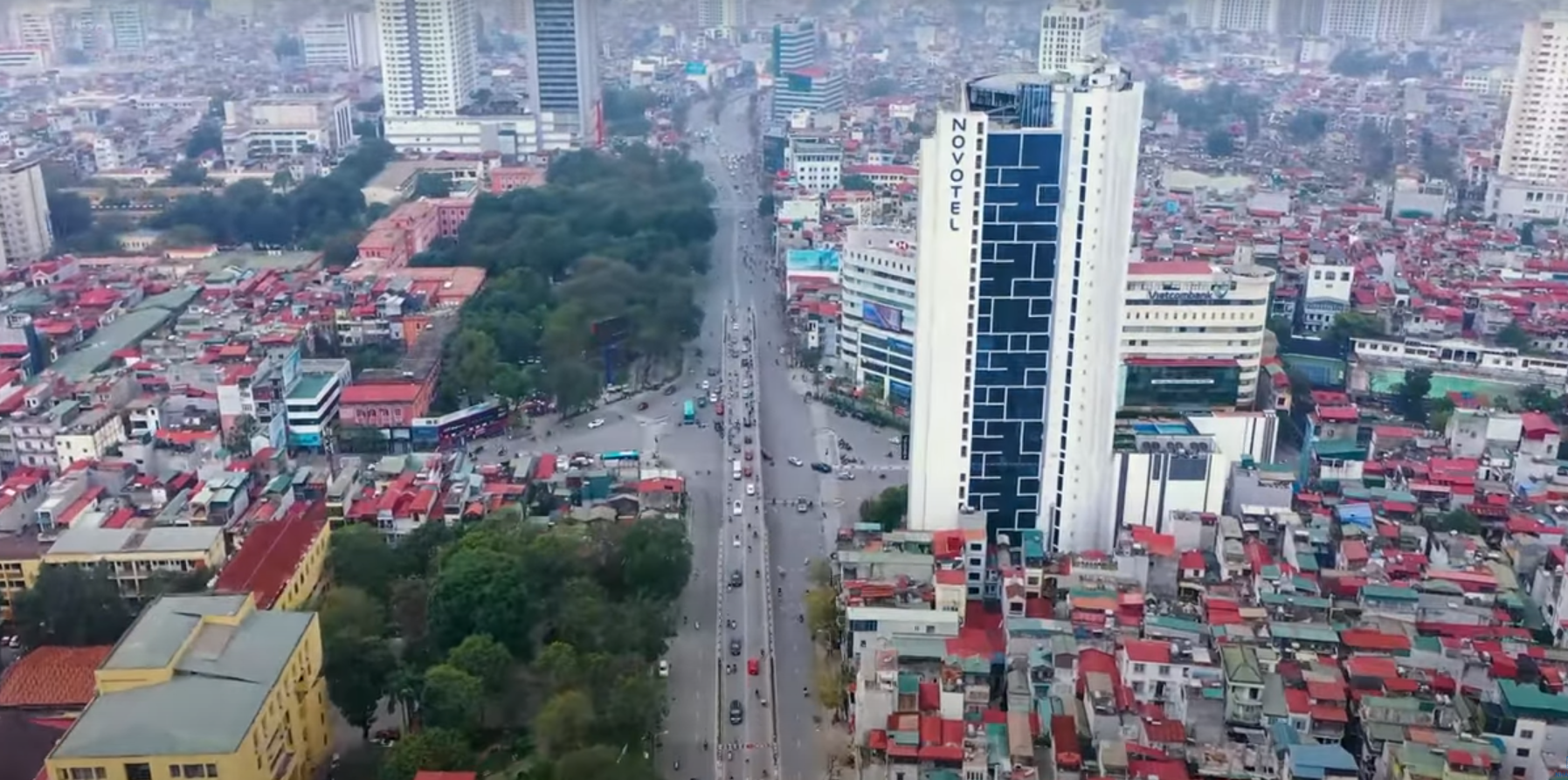
Tay Son Street

== Landmarks ==
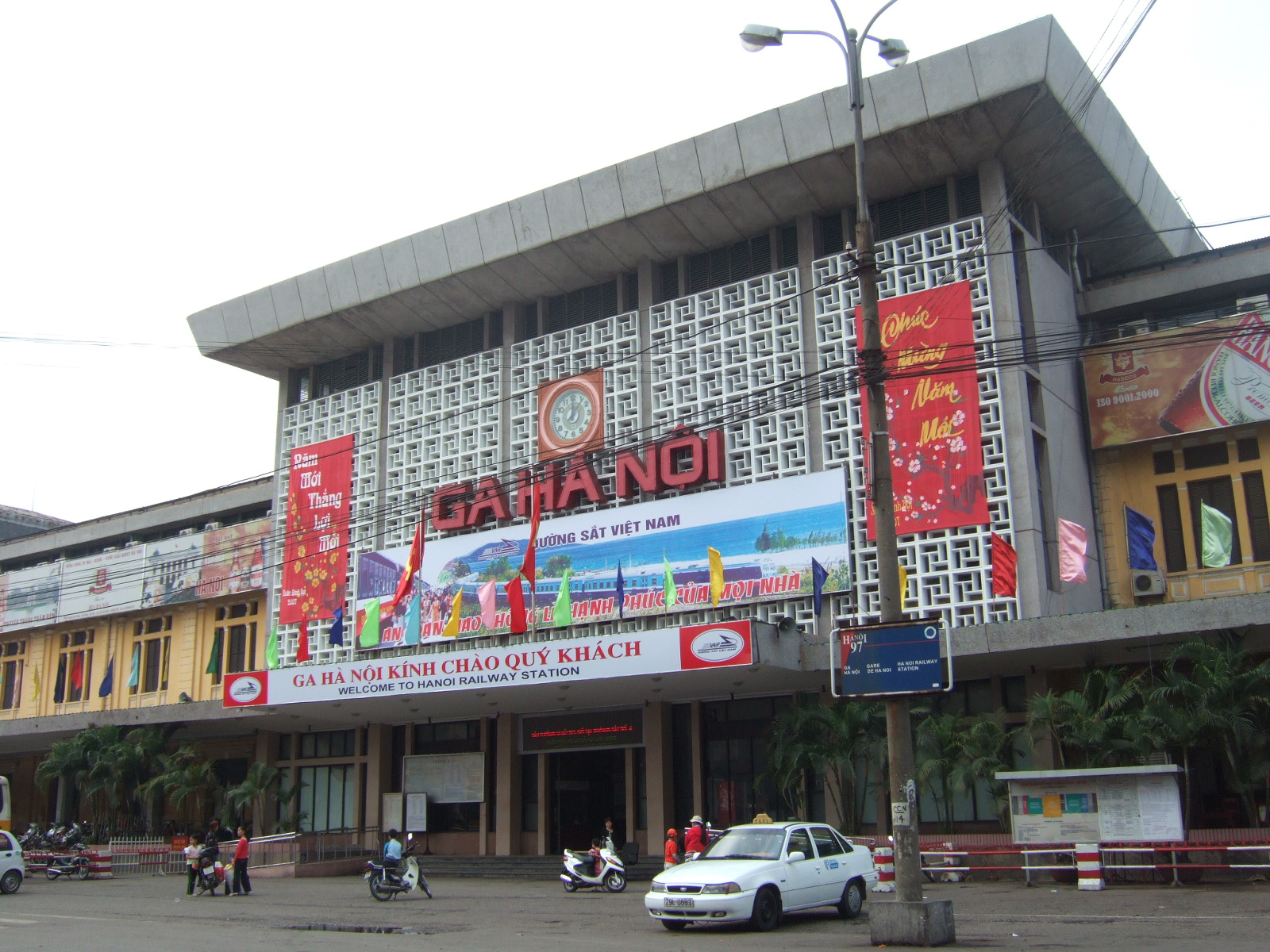
Hanoi station

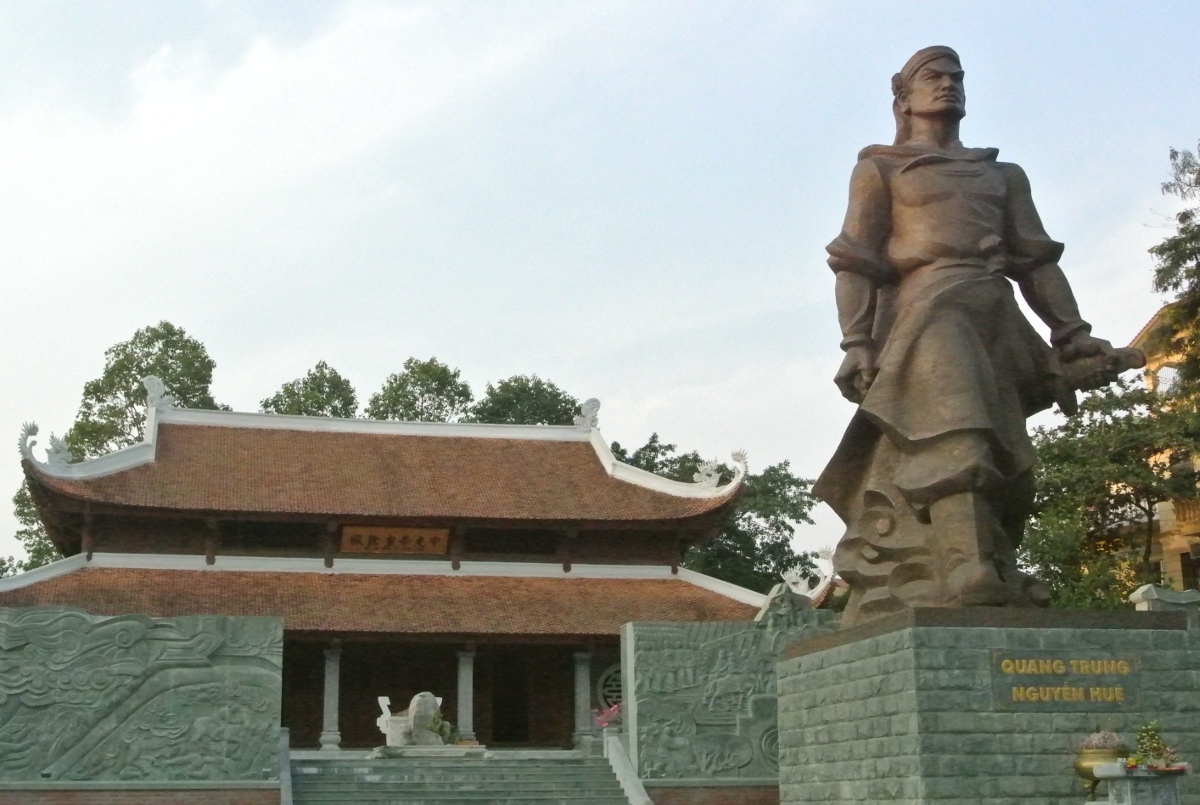
Nguyen Hue statue at Dong Da Mound

- Hanoi station
- Temple of Literature
- Đống Đa Mound
- Boc Pagoda
- Phuc Khanh Pagoda
- Láng Pagoda
- Thong Nhat Park (Lenin Park)
- Hoang Cao Khai's tomb

== Education ==
=== Colleges and universities ===
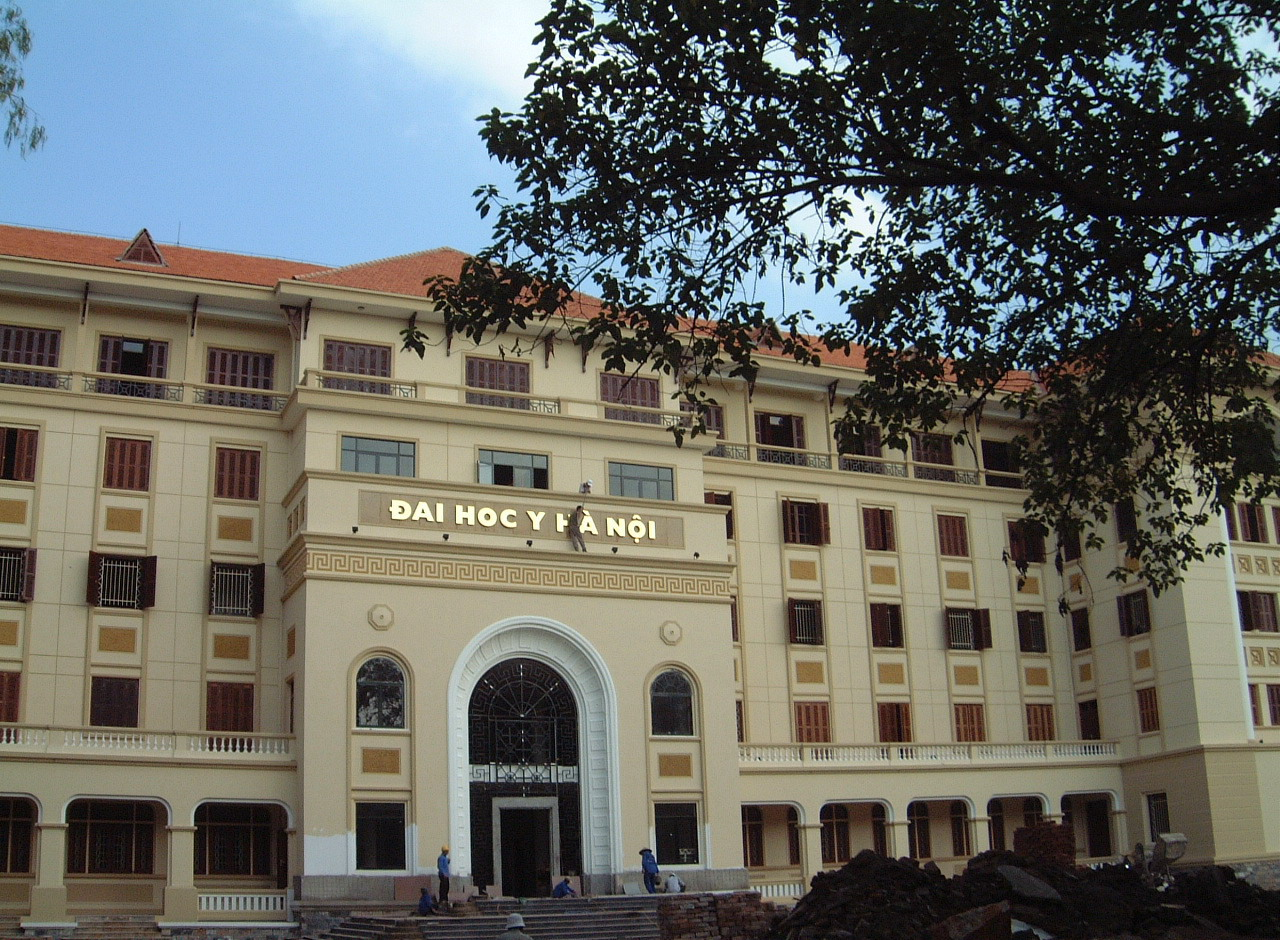
Hanoi Medical University

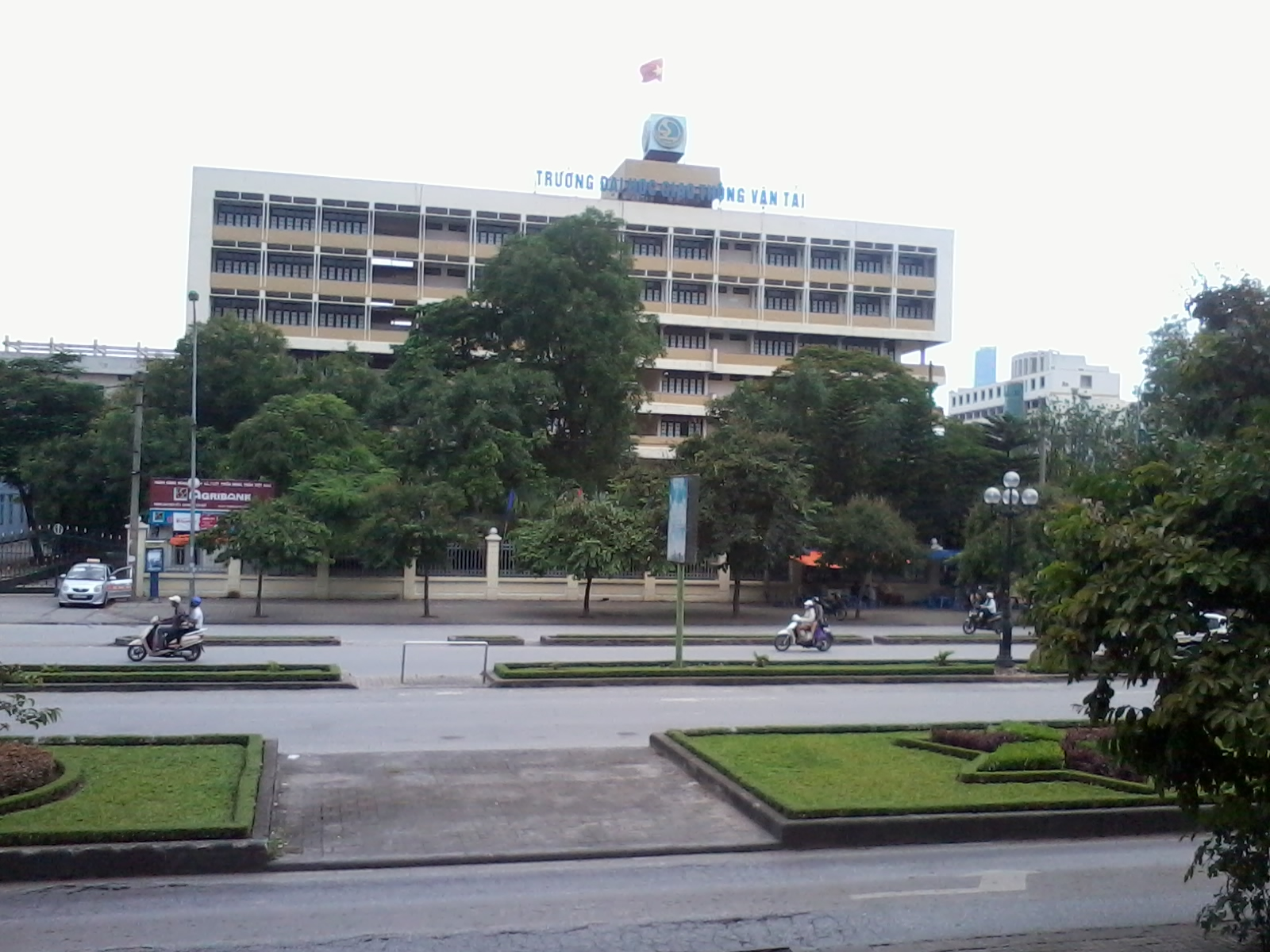
University of Transport and Communications

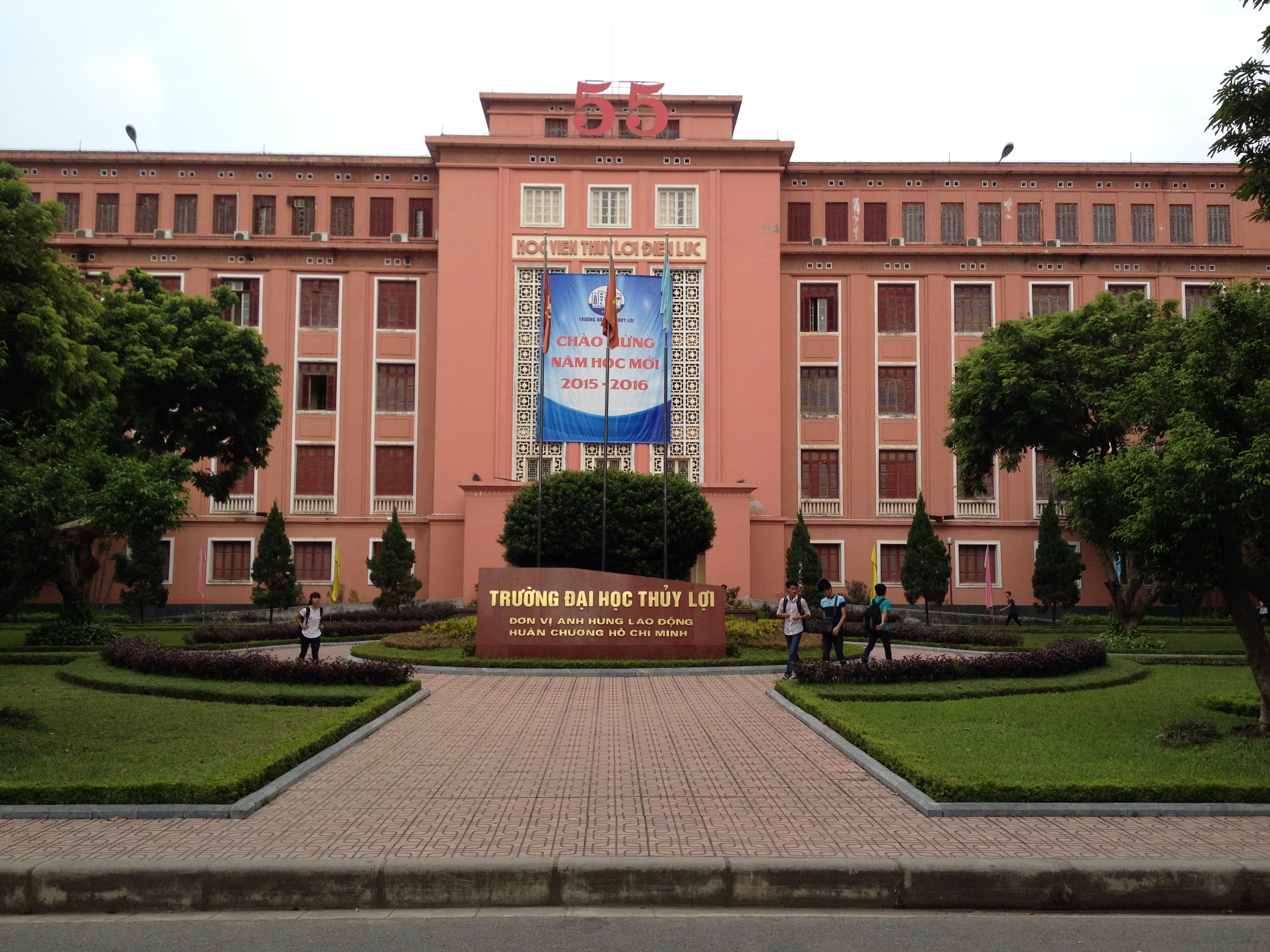
Thuyloi University

- University of Transport and Communications
- Vietnam Trade Union University
- Hanoi Law University
- Foreign Trade University
- Thuyloi University
- Hanoi Medical University
- Diplomatic Academy of Vietnam
- Banking Academy of Vietnam
- Hanoi University of Industrial Fine Arts
- Hanoi University of Culture
- Vietnam National Academy of Music
- National Academy of Public Administration (Vietnam)
- Vietnam Women's Academy
- Vietnam Youth Academy

== Health care and other facilities ==
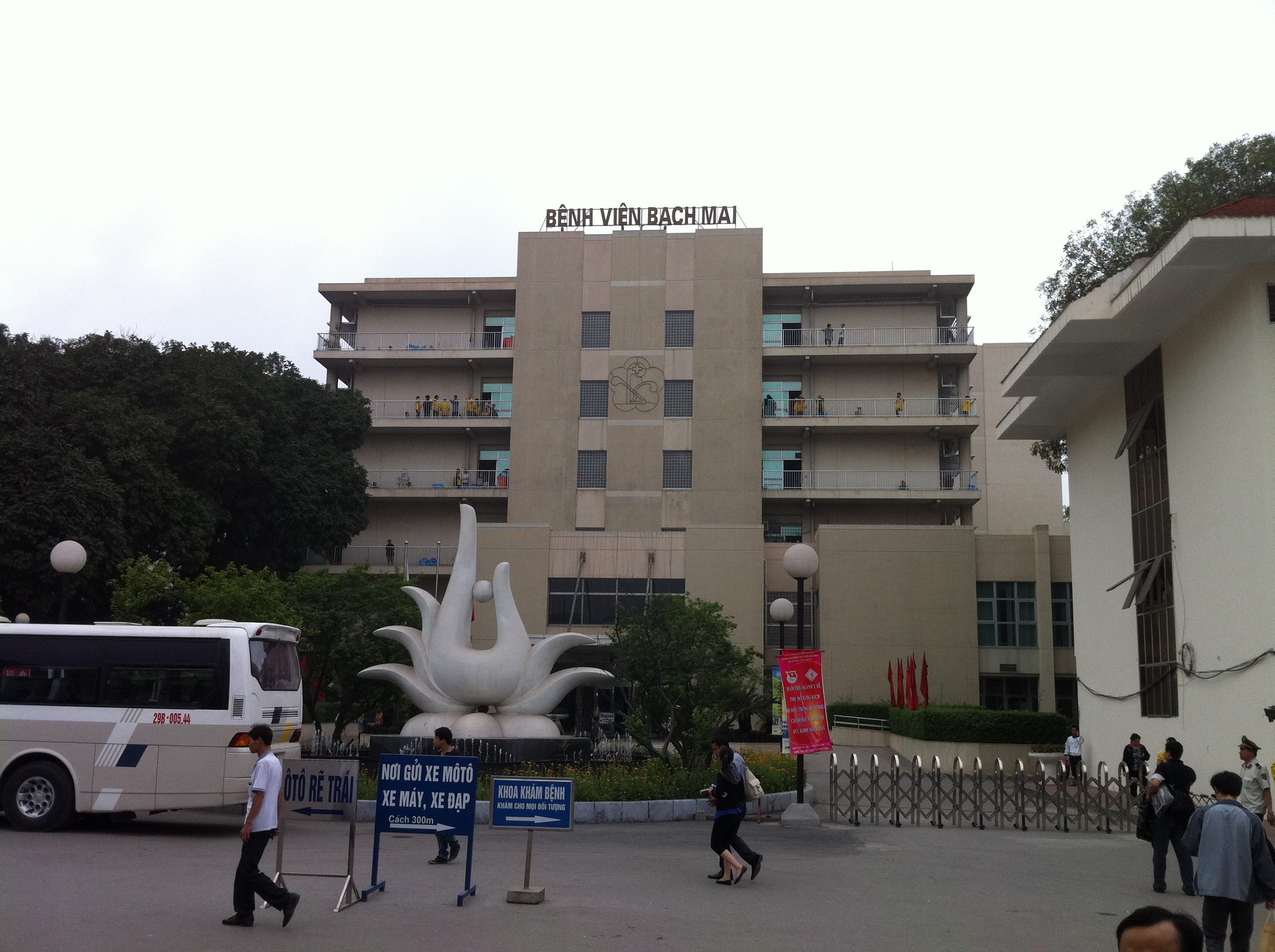
Bạch Mai Hospital

Some medical facilities in Dong Da:

- Bạch Mai Hospital
- Vietnam National Hospital of Acupuncture
- Hôpital Français de Hanoi
- Vietnam National Hospital of Pediatrics
- Hanoi Medical University Hospital
- National Otorhinorarynology Hospital of Vietnam
- National Hospital of Endocrinology
- National Hospital of Dermatology and Venereology

== Sports ==
Hàng Đẫy Stadium, also known as Hanoi Stadium, is situated in Dong Da district. The stadium holds 22,500 spectators, currently used mostly for football matches. Since the 2009 season, all four of the football clubs in Hanoi – Hanoi FC, Thể Công, Hòa Phát Hà Nội, and Hà Nội ACB – have chosen the stadium as their home ground.

== Shopping ==
Đặng Văn Ngữ Street

Đông Các Street

Đông Tác SecondHand Market

Chùa Bộc Street

Chùa Láng Street

== See also ==
- Đống Đa Mound
- Temple of Literature
