= Từ Đạo Hạnh =

- 徐道行
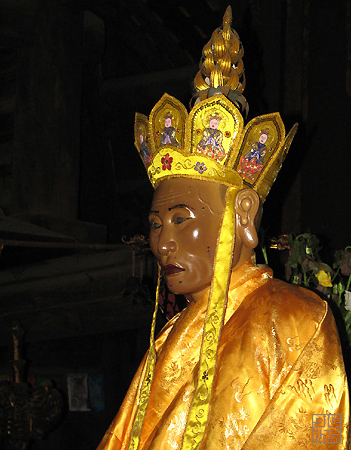
- Statue of Từ Đạo Hạnh at Thầy Temple
- Title: Thiền sư (Zen Master)

Personal life
- Born: Từ Lộ; 1072 Thăng Long, Đại Việt
- Died: 1116 (aged 43–44) Sài Sơn, Quốc Oai, Đại Việt
- Parents: Từ Vinh (father); Tăng Thị Loan (mother)
- Other name: Đức Thánh Láng
- Occupation: Zen monk, mystic

Religious life
- Religion: Buddhism
- School: Mahayana, Thiền
- Lineage: Vinitaruci school
- Dharma names: Từ Đạo Hạnh
- Ordination: Unknown

Senior posting
- Based in: Thầy Temple, Hanoi

Từ Đạo Hạnh (Chinese: 徐道行; 1072 – 1116), commonly called Đức Thánh Láng (德聖𣼽), was a Vietnamese Zen master of the Lý dynasty. His life is recorded in many legendary and mythical stories. Before the legend of Liễu Hạnh spread, he was regarded as one of the most famous Vietnamese saints, counted among the Four Immortals.

The most famous legend about him is that he shed his body and reincarnated as the son of Sùng Hiền hầu, named Lý Dương Hoán, who later became Lý Thần Tông. Because of this legend and the mystical folklore surrounding him, he was long considered one of the Vietnamese Four Immortals until the cult of Liễu Hạnh emerged.

He is venerated at Thiên Phúc Temple (now in Sài Sơn commune, Quốc Oai District, Hà Nội), popularly known as Thầy Temple and Láng Temple, as well as Nền Temple in Hanoi. The annual Thầy Temple Festival is held on the 3rd day of the 3rd lunar month, believed to be the date of his passing.

== Biography ==
According to legend, his name was Lộ (路), son of the official Từ Vinh and Lady Tăng Thị Loan. After his father was killed by a sorcerer named Đại Điên, Từ Lộ intended to travel to India to learn magic to avenge him, but midway he turned back and chose Sài Sơn mountain to cultivate. He devoted himself to reciting the Great Compassion Dharani of Avalokiteśvara until he attained spiritual response. A deity identifying himself as Trấn Thiên Vương appeared and became his servant. Later, with a magic staff, he killed Đại Điên.

Đại Điên reincarnated as a prodigious boy known as Giác Hoàng. King Lý Nhân Tông adopted him but later, during a grand ritual, the child fell ill and died, blocked by Từ Đạo Hạnh’s talisman. For this, Từ Đạo Hạnh was summoned to Hưng Thánh tower. He then promised Sùng Hiền hầu, the king’s brother, that he would be reborn as his son in repayment if informed before the birth.

He was also famed for magical feats with his companions Nguyễn Minh Không and Giác Hải. A prophecy foretold he would be reborn as a tiger in the next life, a fate later associated with Lý Thần Tông’s mysterious illness.

== Shedding the body ==
Legend says that before dying, Từ Đạo Hạnh foretold his rebirth as the son of Sùng Hiền hầu. After his death on the 7th day of the 3rd lunar month, 1116, he reincarnated as Lý Dương Hoán, who later ascended the throne as Lý Thần Tông.

Later, Lý Thần Tông suffered a strange disease, growing tiger-like hair and roaring like a tiger. Only the monk Nguyễn Minh Không cured him.

In Hanoi, Láng Temple (Chiêu Thiền Tự) was built during the reign of Lý Anh Tông to honor both Từ Đạo Hạnh and Lý Thần Tông. Nền Temple was also constructed on his former residence.

== Works ==
- Giáo trò
- Hữu không (in Thơ văn Lý Trần, vol. I, Social Sciences Publishing, 1977)
- Kệ thị tịch
- Thất châu
- Vấn Kiều Trí Huyền

== Four Immortals ==
The Four Immortals (四不死) are the quartet of immortal saints in Vietnamese belief: Tản Viên Sơn Thánh, Phù Đổng Thiên Vương, Chử Đồng Tử, and Liễu Hạnh. Before the rise of Liễu Hạnh, Từ Đạo Hạnh was sometimes counted among them. He became the archetype of the Thánh Tổ—monk-saints worshiped as protective deities in Vietnamese Buddhism.

== Temples and Shrines ==
Numerous temples in Hanoi and surrounding provinces are dedicated to Từ Đạo Hạnh, including Thầy Temple, Láng Temple, Nền Temple, Lý Triều Quốc Sư Temple, Trăm Gian Temple, and others. Many preserve legends tied to his life, reincarnation, and miracles.

== System of Related Temples and Shrines ==
No.	Monument Name	Other Names	Worshipped Figures	Address	Notes
1	Thầy Temple	Thiên Phúc Tự, Hương Hải Am, Chùa Cả	Lý Thần Tông, Từ Đạo Hạnh, his parents	Sài Sơn, Quốc Oai, Hanoi	Main worship site
2	Thầy Temple	Đỉnh Sơn Cổ Tự	Từ Đạo Hạnh, his parents, Giác Hải, Nguyễn Minh Không	Sài Sơn, Quốc Oai, Hanoi	
3	Thầy Temple	Một Mái Temple (Bối Am Temple)	Từ Đạo Hạnh	Sài Sơn, Quốc Oai, Hanoi	
4	Long Đẩu Temple		Từ Đạo Hạnh	Sài Sơn, Quốc Oai, Hanoi	
5	Quán Thánh Temple		Từ Đạo Hạnh		
6	Hoa Phát Temple		Từ Đạo Hạnh		
7	Láng Temple	Chiêu Thiền Tự	Từ Đạo Hạnh, Lý Thần Tông	Láng Thượng, Đống Đa, Hanoi	Main worship site built by the Lý dynasty to honor Lý Thần Tông
8	Nền Temple	Đản Cơ Tự	Từ Vinh (father of the saint)		
9	Hoa Lăng Temple	Ba Lăng Tự	Tăng Thị Loan (mother of the saint)	No. 2, alley 51, lane 58 Nguyễn Khánh Toàn, Cầu Giấy, Hanoi	
10	Thưa Temple	Cổ Sơn Tự	Từ Nương (sister of Từ Đạo Hạnh)	Láng	
11	Lý Triều Quốc Sư Temple		Nguyễn Minh Không, Từ Đạo Hạnh, Giác Hải	Hoàn Kiếm, Hanoi	
12	Thượng Đình Communal House		Đô Sát Từ Vinh	Thượng Đình, Thanh Xuân, Hanoi	Where the body of Từ Vinh drifted along the Tô Lịch River and locals buried him. Later he was enshrined as a village deity.
13	Tam Huyền Temple	Sùng Phúc Tự	Đô Sát Từ Vinh	Thượng Đình, Thanh Xuân, Hanoi	
14	Đồng Bụt Temple	Thiền Sư Tự	Từ Đạo Hạnh	Ngọc Liệp, Quốc Oai, Hanoi	
15	Tổng La Phù Temple	Thiên Hương Tự	Từ Đạo Hạnh, Nguyễn Minh Không, Giác Hải	La Phù, Hoài Đức, Hanoi	
16	Múa Temple	Thiên Vũ Tự	Từ Đạo Hạnh, Nguyễn Minh Không, Giác Hải	Dương Nội, Hà Đông, Hanoi	Where Từ Đạo Hạnh transformed into a tiger to frighten Nguyễn Minh Không
17	Vằn Temple	Thiên Văn Tự	Từ Đạo Hạnh, Nguyễn Minh Không, Giác Hải	An Khánh, Hoài Đức, Hanoi	Where Từ Đạo Hạnh discarded a tiger skin
18	Bi Temple	Đại Bi Tự	Từ Đạo Hạnh	Nam Giang, Nam Trực, Nam Định	After his father was killed by Đại Điên, Từ Đạo Hạnh brought his mother to live here.
19	Phả Lại Temple	Chúc Thánh Tự	Từ Đạo Hạnh, Nguyễn Minh Không, Giác Hải	Đức Long, Quế Võ, Bắc Ninh	
20	Múa Temple	Phượng Vũ Tự	Từ Đạo Hạnh, Lý Thần Tông, Đô Sát Từ Vinh	Minh Khai, Vũ Thư, Thái Bình	Where Từ Đạo Hạnh subdued a water monster for the people
21	Cả Temple	Trung Hưng Tự	Từ Đạo Hạnh	La Phù, Hoài Đức, Hanoi	
22	Ngãi Cầu Temple	Phổ Quang Tự	Từ Đạo Hạnh	An Khánh, Hoài Đức, Hanoi	
23	Miếu Vườn Nở Shrine		Từ Đạo Hạnh	Đồng Bụt, Quốc Oai, Hanoi	Where Lady Tăng Thị Loan dreamed of a lotus before conceiving the saint
24	Linh Tiên Quán Daoist Temple		Lý Triều Thánh Tổ	Đức Thượng, Hoài Đức, Hanoi	Altar of Thánh Tổ on the left of the main hall
25	Lủ Temple	Kim Phúc Tự, Diên Phúc Tự, Kim Giang Temple		122 Kim Giang, Đại Kim, Hanoi	
26	Kim Giang Communal House		Từ Vinh, Mạo Hoa Giáp	Thượng Đình, Hanoi	
27	Ông Temple	Bản Tịch Tự	Từ Đạo Hạnh, Lý Thần Tông	Bình Lương village, Tân Quang, Văn Lâm, Hưng Yên	
28	Xuân Quan Temple	Huệ Trạch Tự	Pháp Thông Vương Phật	Xuân Quan village, Trí Quả, Thuận Thành, Bắc Ninh	Female disciple of Từ Đạo Hạnh
29	Trăm Gian Temple	Vĩnh Khánh Tự, An Ninh Tự	Toàn Nương (Phạm Thị Toàn)	Nam Sách, Hải Dương	Female disciple of Từ Đạo Hạnh

== See also ==
- Lý Nhân Tông
- Lý Thần Tông
- Nguyễn Minh Không
