= Đống Đa Mound =

Historic burial mound in Hanoi, Vietnam

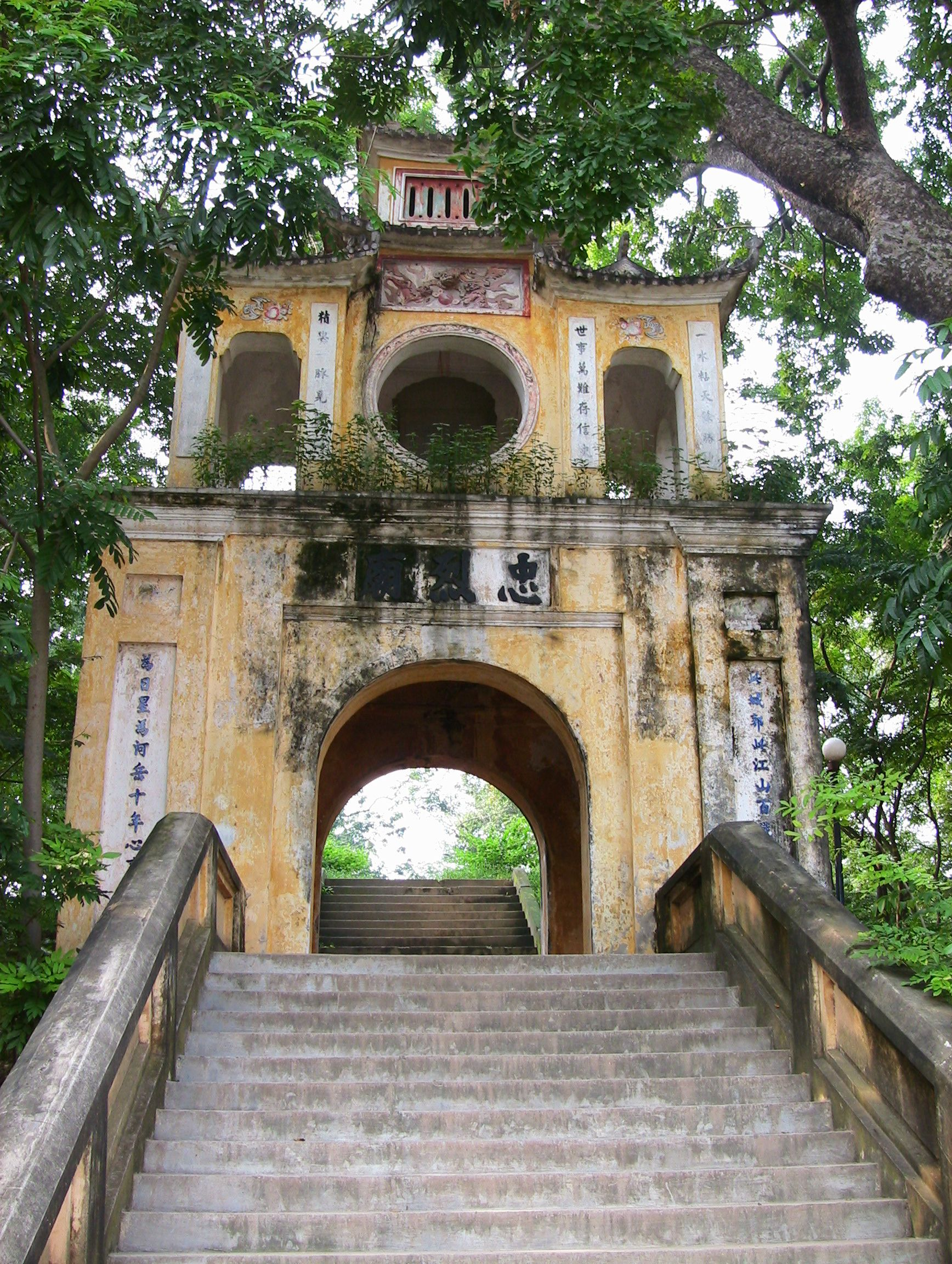
- The entrance of Đống Đa Mound

Highest point
- Elevation: 13 m (43 ft)
- Coordinates: 21°0′43.13″N 105°49′28.024″E

Geography
- Location: Đống Đa District, Hanoi, Vietnam

Đống Đa Mound (Vietnamese: Gò Đống Đa) or Đống Đa Hill is a historic tumulus-like mound in the Đống Đa Park (Công viên Đống Đa), in the Đống Đa District, Hanoi, Vietnam.

== Background ==
Đống Đa Mound is said to be the place where the Battle of Ngọc Hồi-Đống Đa between Tây-Sơn and the Manchu Qing army ended.

Having lost, Sầm Nghi Đống (Chinese: 岑宜棟) fled and refused to fall into the hands of the Tây-Sơn by hanging himself on Ốc (Loa Sơn) hill. After the war, in order to promote diplomatic relations with the Qing, Sầm Nghi Đống was given a state burial and resident Han Chinese were allowed to build a temple on today's Đào Duy Từ street.

After the battle, King Quang Trung ordered the bodies of the enemies to be collected and put into 12 large burial mounds. These 12 hills were spread from Thịnh Quang to Nam Đồng villages. As they became overgrown with banyan trees the landscape came to be called Đống Đa, literally Heap of Banyan trees.

In 1851, during construction and clearance work for new roads and the Nam Đồng markets, more remains were found and gathered into a big burial next to Ốc hill. This mound gradually expanded and merged with Ốc hill. As it became overgrown it eventually came to be named Đống Đa Mound.

During the French occupation, the French army dug out the twelve hills leaving only Ốc mound untouched. Therefore, the current Đống Đa Mound became the remaining 13th mound.

In 1989, to commemorate the 200th anniversary of the victory the Đống Đa Park was established.

== Location ==
Đống Đa Mound is located within the Đống Đa Park. On top of Đống Đa Mound is a temple gate which has on its top 3 Han Chinese words Trung Liệt miếu (Trung Liệt shrine). There was supposed to be a temple which doesn’t exist anymore. From the foot of the mount leads a paved way to the statue of King Quang Trung-Nguyễn Huệ with two relievos and a museum.

== Đống Đa Festival ==
Around 1851, the inhabitants of Nam Đồng and Thịnh Quang villages built a pagoda, Đồng Quang Pagoda, in front of the mound. From then on, the Đồng Quang Pagoda organized an annual religious ceremony to commemorate the Đống Đa Battle on the 5th day of the Lunar New Year. People would gather and many activities would take place like a play of the battle, and the triumphant march into Thăng Long Citadel.
