= Thầy Temple =

Buddhist temple in the province of Greater Hanoi, Vietnam

- Thiên Phúc Tự (Chữ Hán: 天福寺)
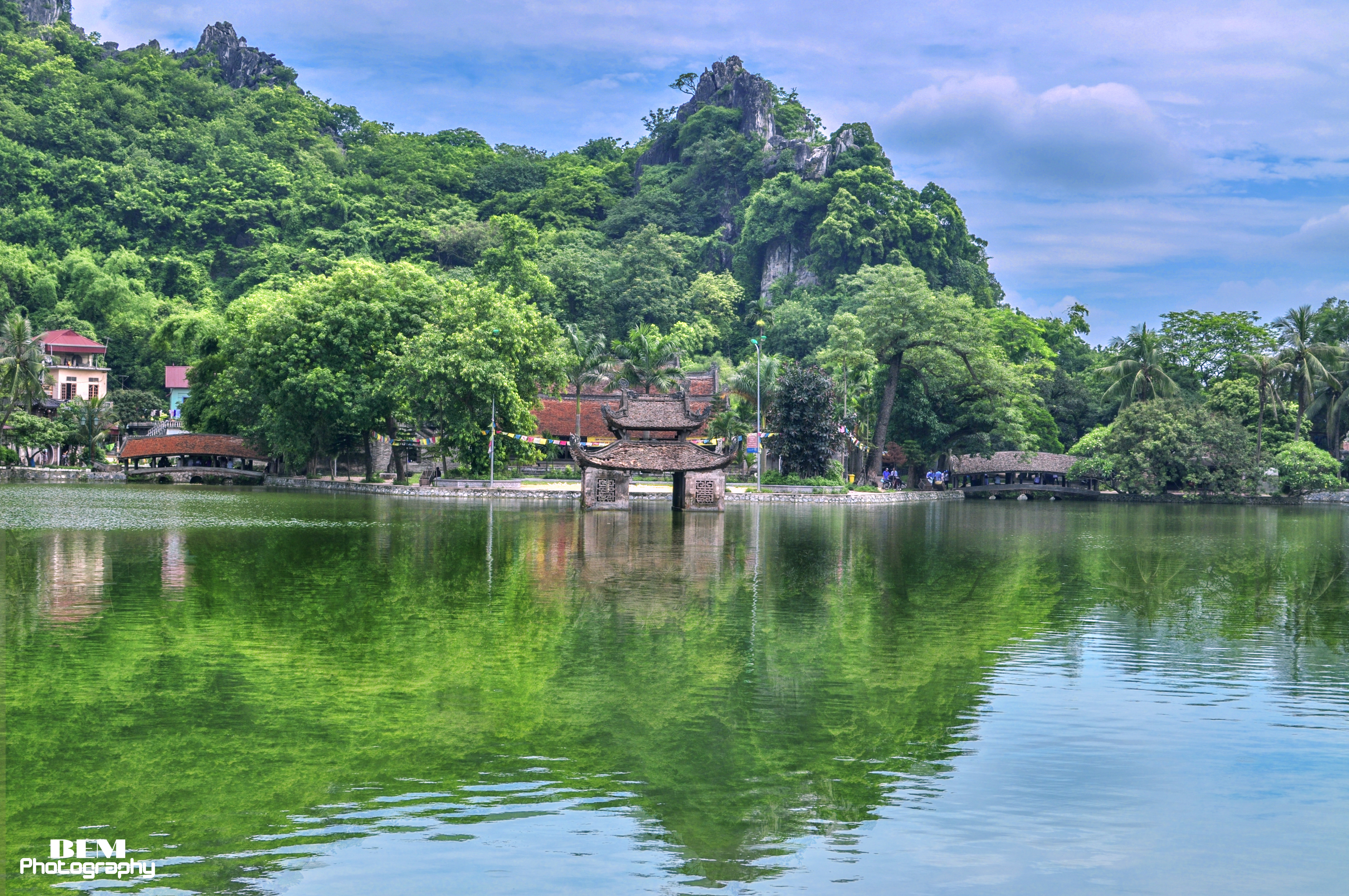
- Panoramic lake at Thầy Temple

- Location of Thầy Temple in Hanoi

Religion
- Affiliation: Buddhism
- Province: Hanoi
- Deity: Gautama Buddha with 18 arhats, Emperor Lý Nhân Tông and Zen master Từ Đạo Hạnh

Location
- Location: Sài Sơn, Quốc Oai
- Country: Vietnam
- Coordinates: 21.022267°N 105.645625°E

Architecture
- Completed: 11th century

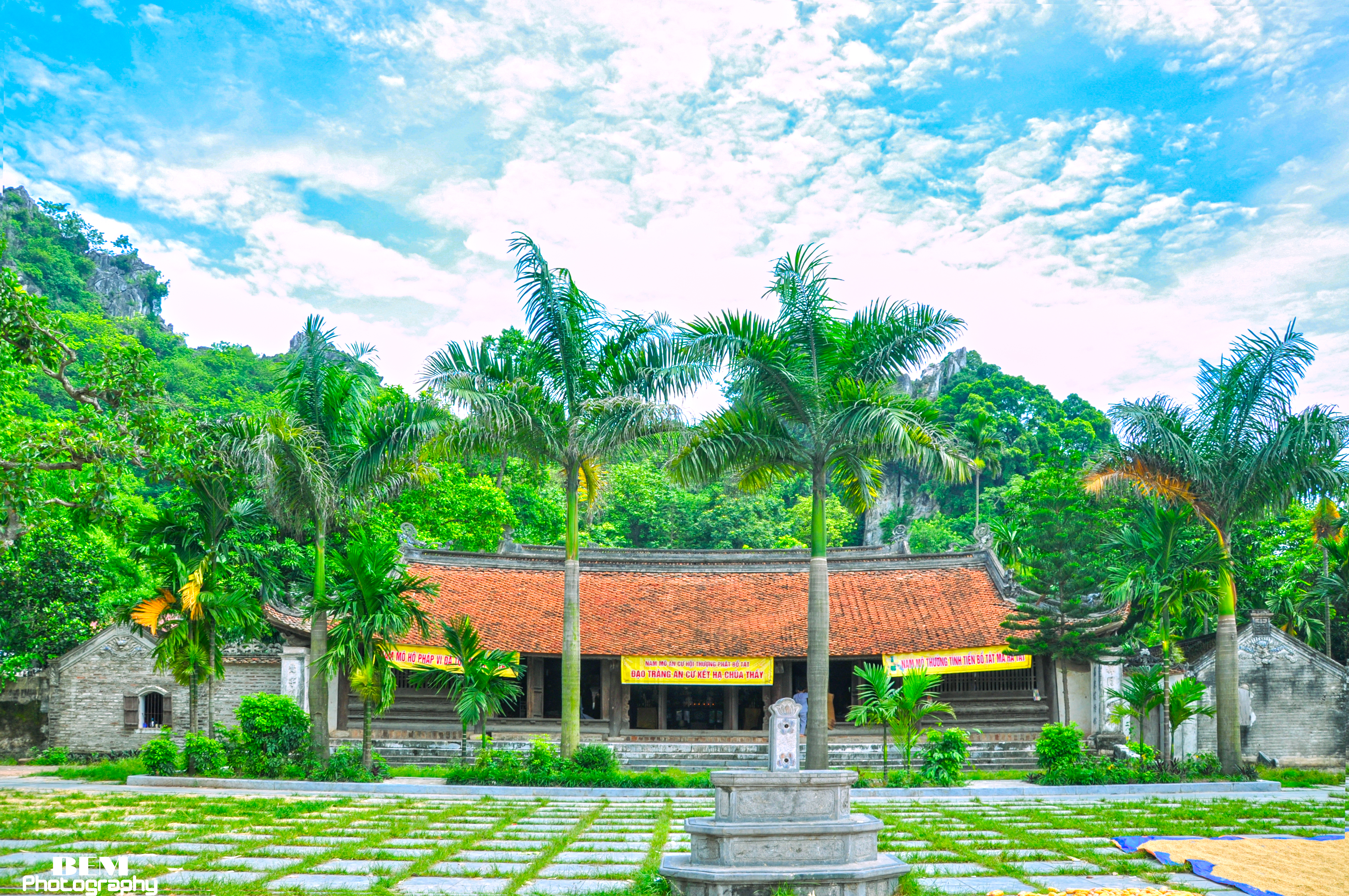
The main hall of Thầy Temple

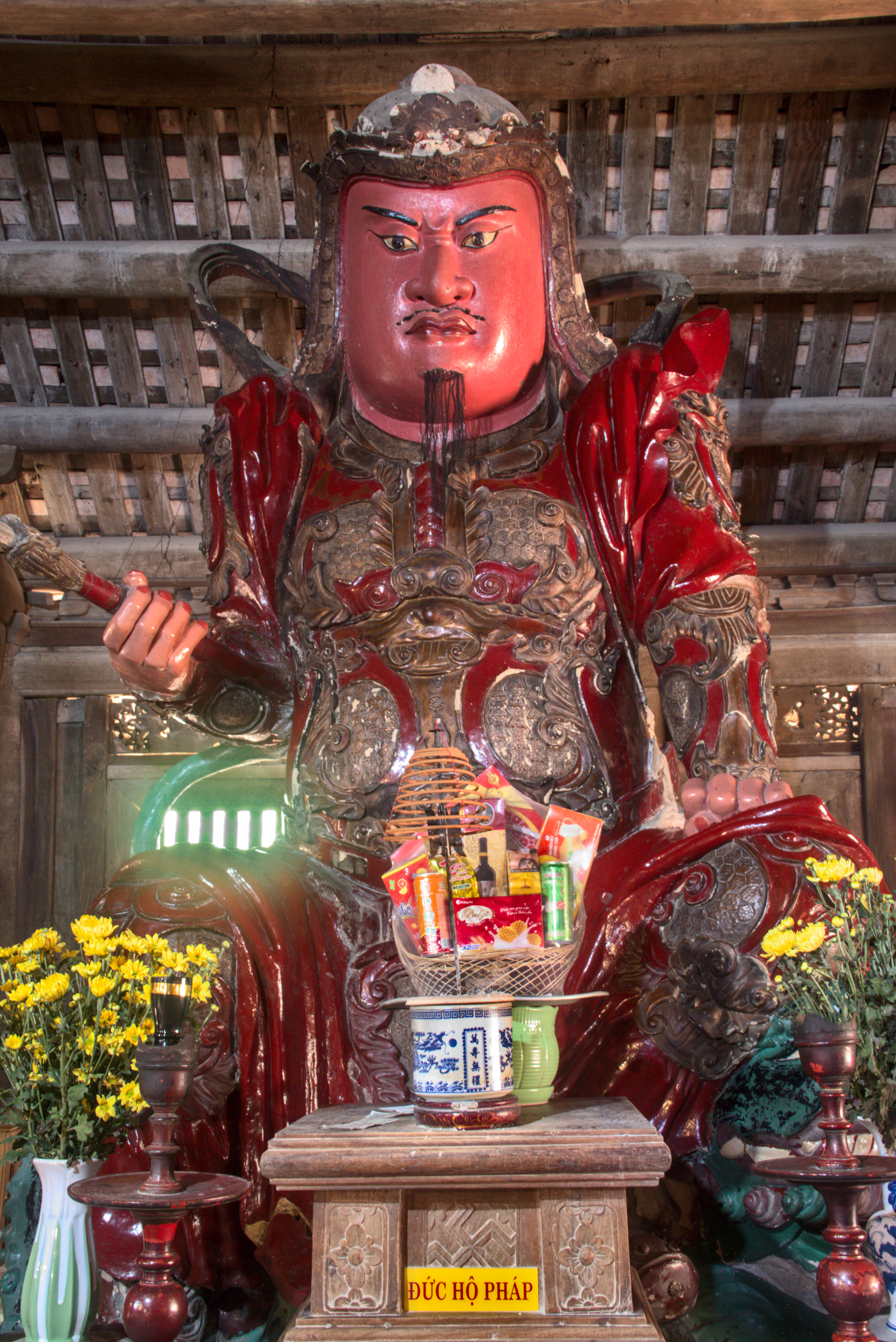
Statue of a Trừng Ác dharmapala inside the temple

Thầy Temple (Vietnamese: Chùa Thầy or Master's Temple) is a Buddhist temple in Quốc Oai Commune (formerly Hà Tây Province, now part of Hanoi), Vietnam. The temple is also known as Thiên Phúc Tự ("Temple of Heavenly Blessings"). The temple was established in the 11th century during the reign of Emperor Lý Nhân Tông of the Lý dynasty. It is dedicated to Zen master Từ Đạo Hạnh (1072–1116). It is one of the oldest Buddhist temples in Vietnam. It is well maintained by the monks.

The temple is a center of pilgrimage during Tết.

== Geography ==
The temple is located in Sài Sơn village, 30 kilometres (19 mi) from Hanoi. It sits on the banks of an artificial lake, at the foot of the Sài Sơn Mountain, near Thăng Long Boulevard.

== History ==
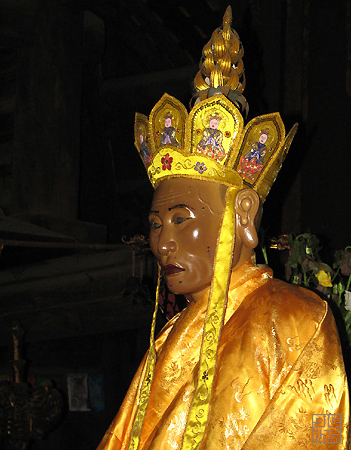
Từ Đạo Hạnh, the monk

Từ Đạo Hạnh (also known as Minh Không) was a famous monk. He was the chief monk at the temple, a choreographer of traditional water puppetry, an inventor, and also a medical man and mystic in his village. The mystic acts associated with the monk include him burning his finger to usher in rain and curing local people of disease by blessing them, in addition to performing many other miracles.

He presented water puppetry (which is unique to Vietnam) at the small lake pavilion which he built in the middle of the lake, in front of the main hall. According to the local belief he had incarnated thrice, once as Buddha in the form of Sakhyamuni, then as the son of King Lý Nhân Tông who later became the King Lý Thần Tông and then as a monk who saved the King Thần Tông also. He created his own brand of Từ Đạo Hạnh cult.

== Features ==
The temple is divided into three parts. The entrance hall is the prayer hall. The middle chamber has images of Buddhas surrounded by demons, made of lacquer and garbed in red-coloured attire. The back chamber has statues of the monk.

The temple has been refurbished many times. The temple has three dedications: to Emperor Lý Thần Tông (1127 to 1138), to Gautama Buddha and his eighteen arhats and to the Buddhist monk and Thiền master Từ Đạo Hạnh. It is built in a typical Vietnamese architectural style. The main prayer hall of the temple has nearly 100 colourful images of different period. At the entrance to the shrine there are two large clay mixed papier-mâché images of the 7th century, each weighing about a ton; these are considered the largest such images in Vietnam.

The main hall contains the temple's oldest image, dating from the temple's foundation: a triptych of Buddha and disciples dating from the 16th century on a high pedestal. There is a 13th-century statue of a bodhisattva seated on a lotus throne, which is a wooden statue draped in yellow. It was made in the likeness of the master Đạo Hạnh in a pensive mood. The statues of Từ Đạo Hạnh and his reincarnation in the form of Lý Thánh Tông are located in the hall next to each other.

Within the same temple complex there is a small shrine referred to as the "old temple" (Vietnamese: chùa cũ). It was founded by Emperor Lý Thái Tổ in 1132 and has been renovated several times.

There are two arched bridges connecting to the temple. Built in 1602, they are named Sun and Moon. One of these bridges leads to a small island, home to a small Taoist temple representing the elements of earth, air, and water. The second bridge leads to a limestone hill. Đạo Hạnh, during the last stage of his life, had walked up to this place and disappeared in a cave. This cave is located in the middle of roots of banyans and is hemmed between a small temple built in honour of the monk's parents and a small temple. Both these are religious places from where there are lovely vistas of the entire valley. There is also a limestone grotto known as the hang Cắc Cớ, "the Mischievous".

== Festival ==
A colourful festival, known as the Thầy temple festival, is held in honour of the monk Từ Đạo Hạnh. It is held from the 5th to the 7th day of the third lunar month. During the festival puppet groups present water puppetry stage shows at the open air theater in the lake. A pageant of tableaux are also taken out on the occasion. Participants in the festivities come from four villages. The sandalwood statue of the master, located in the temple, is moved with intertwined strings during the puppet festival.

During other festivals held here, poems written by Từ Đạo Hạnh and Emperor Lý Nhân Tông are recited.

== Bibliography ==
- Dodd, Jan; Lewis, Mark (2003). Rough Guide to Vietnam. Rough Guides. ISBN 978-1-84353-095-4.
- Hoskin, John; Howland, Carol (2006). Vietnam. New Holland Publishers. ISBN 978-1-84537-551-5.
- Fodor's See It Vietnam, 3rd Edition. Fodor's Travel Publications. 4 September 2012. ISBN 978-1-4000-0365-5.
- Drummond, Lisa; Thomas, Mandy (5 June 2003). Consuming Urban Culture in Contemporary Vietnam. Taylor & Francis. ISBN 978-0-203-98794-0.
- Joliat, Bernard; Vian, Sonia (2003). Vietnam, Laos, Cambodia. JPM Publications. ISBN 978-2-88452-266-3.
- Rutherford, Scott (1 December 2002). Vietnam. Langenscheidt Publishing Group. ISBN 978-981-234-984-2.
