= Cen Yidong =

- Native chief of Tianzhou; Magistrate of Tianzhou

Native chief of Tianzhou
- Reign: 1746 – 1789
- Predecessor: Cen Yingqi
- Successor: Cen Yu
- Born: ? Tianzhou, Guangxi, Qing China (present day Tianyang County)
- Died: 1789; Đống Đa, Đại Việt
Names
- Cen Yidong
Regnal name
- Magistrate of Tianzhou (田州知府)

Cen Yidong (Chinese: 岑宜棟; pinyin: Cén Yídòng, Vietnamese: Sầm Nghi Đống, ? – January 30, 1789) was a Zhuang official of Qing dynasty. He was the hereditary tǔsī (native chief) of Tianzhou (present day Tianyang County of Guangxi).

Cen succeeded his grandfather Cen Yingqi (岑應祺) in 1746. He was granted the position "Magistrate of Tianzhou" (田州知府) by Qing dynasty. During his term, he built several schools in Tianzhou. His son Cen Zhao (岑照) cheated in imperial examination, and was executed in 1783.

Cen led 2000 soldiers to take part in the Battle of Ngọc Hồi-Đống Đa. He was ordered to guard Đống Đa Fort. On January 30, 1789 (Lunar calendar January 5 of Kỷ Dậu), his army was besieged by a Tây Sơn army under general Đặng Tiến Đông. Cen committed suicide by hanging. 2000 soldiers also died in the battle.

Cen was buried in Đống Đa Mound together with his soldiers. His son Cen Yu (岑煜) succeeded him.

To maintain a healthy relationship with Qing China, Vietnamese rulers allowed the Chinese immigrants to establish a shrine dedicated to Cen at Sầm Công street (now Đào Duy Từ Street, Hanoi). The shrine was sarcastically described in a famous poem of Hồ Xuân Hương.

Ghé mắt trông ngang thấy bảng treo.
Kìa đền Thái thú đứng cheo leo.
Ví đây đổi phận làm trai được.
Thì sự anh hùng há bấy nhiêu!

Turning the eyes around and seeing the signboard.
Oh that's the Magistrate shrine stands so arduously.
If I could change my fate and become a man.
My achievements could have been not so trivial like him!

Government offices
Preceded by Cen Yingqi	Native chief of Tianzhou; 1746─1789	Succeeded by Cen Yu
