= Foreign Trade University =

Public university of Vietnam

- Trường Đại học Ngoại thương
- Former name: University of Foreign Affairs - Foreign Trade
- Type: Public
- Established: 1960
- President: Bùi Anh Tuấn
- Vice-president: Phạm Thu Hương, Đào Ngọc Tiến
- Academic staff: 554
- Administrative staff: 252
- Students: 14,000
- Postgraduates: 1,000
- Location: Hanoi, Vietnam; 21.023°N 105.805°E
- Campus: Hanoi, Ho Chi Minh City, Quang Ninh
- Colours: Red & white
- Website: www.ftu.edu.vn

Foreign Trade University (FTU; Vietnamese: Trường Đại học Ngoại thương) is a public university established in 1960, located in Hanoi, Vietnam, with satellite campuses in Ho Chi Minh City and Quảng Ninh.

FTU is regarded as one of the most prestigious universities in Vietnam, offering a wide range of business courses - from economics, business administration, and finance to economic law and business languages. The annual admission to FTU is the most competitive in Vietnam and applicants are required to have very high test scores. The core major of the university is International Business Economics, which attracts the most elite students in the country.

FTU offers both undergraduate and graduate programs for both local and foreign students. These courses are taught in Vietnamese, English, Japanese, Chinese and French.

== President Board ==
- President: Assoc.Prof.Dr Bui Anh Tuan
- Chairman of University Council: Assoc.Prof.Dr Le Thi Thu Thuy
- Vice President: Assoc.Prof.Dr Pham Thu Huong
- Vice President: Assoc.Prof.Dr Dao Ngoc Tien

== Academic faculties and departments ==
- School of Economics and International Business
- Faculty of International Economics
- Faculty of Law
- Faculty of Business Administration
- Faculty of Banking & Finance
- Faculty of Business English
- Faculty of Japanese Language
- Faculty of Chinese Language
- Faculty of French Language
- Faculty of English for Specific Purposes
- Faculty of Political Sciences
- Faculty of Basic Science
- Department of Vietnamese Language
- Department of Russian Language

== Courses and programs ==
=== Degree programs ===
==== Bachelor programs ====
- Bachelor of International Business Economics (Advanced Program, taught in English, with Colorado State University, USA)
- Bachelor of International Business Economics (High Quality program, taught in English)
- Bachelor of International Business Economics
- Bachelor of International Trade
- Bachelor of International Business
- Bachelor of International Business Management (Advanced Program, taught in English, with California State University, USA)
- Bachelor of International Business Management (High Quality program, taught in English)
- Bachelor of International Business Management
- Bachelor of Accounting
- Bachelor of Banking and International Finance (High Quality program, taught in English)
- Bachelor of International Finance
- Bachelor of Financial Analysis and Investment Management
- Bachelor of Banking
- Bachelor of International Economics (High Quality program, taught in English)
- Bachelor of International Economics
- Bachelor of Economics (French Program, with University of Nice Sophia Antipolis, France)
- Bachelor of International Business Law (LLB)
- Bachelor of International Trade Law (LLB)
- Bachelor of Business English
- Bachelor of Business Japanese
- Bachelor of Business Chinese
- Bachelor of Business French
- Bachelor of Business Studies (English Program, with University of Bedfordshire, UK)
- Bachelor of Financial Management & Services (English Program, with Niels Brock Copenhagen Business College, Denmark)
- Bachelor's degree in International Finance Services/Finance/Economics (English Program, with London Metropolitan University, UK)

==== Master programs ====
- Master of International Economics
- Master of Business Administration
- Master of International Business
- Master of Banking and Finance
- Master of International Business (English Program, with La Trobe University, Australia)
- Master of International Trade Law and Policy (English Program, with World Trade Institute, Switzerland)
- Master of Europe-Asia Economic Relations (French Program, with University of Rennes, France)
- Master of Project for Innovation and Enterprise Project Management (English/French Program, with Nantes University, France)
- Master of Business Administration in Finance (English Program, with University of Stirling, UK)
- Master of Science in finance (English Program, with University of Rennes 1, France)
- Vietnam Executive Master of Business Administration (English Program, with University of Hawai'i)

==== Doctoral programs ====
- Doctor of World Economy and International Economic Relations
- Doctor of Business Administration

== International cooperation ==
Foreign Trade University provides students with exchange programs with partner universities all over the world as a Non-degree international students.

Area	Country	School
America	Canada	University of Victoria, The Peter B. Gustavon School of Business
America	US	Millikin University
America	US	Niagara University
America	US	University of South Carolina
Asia	Indonesia	Ubaya University (Universitas Surabaya)
Asia	Japan	Aichi University
Asia	Japan	Akita International University
Asia	Japan	Aomori Chuo Gakuin University
Asia	Japan	Doshisha Women's College of Liberal Arts
Asia	Japan	Fukui Prefectural University
Asia	Japan	Fukuyama University
Asia	Japan	Hiroshima University of Economics
Asia	Japan	Hitotsubashi University
Asia	Japan	J. F. Oberlin University
Asia	Japan	Kagoshima University
Asia	Japan	Kanazawa University
Asia	Japan	Kanda University of International Studies
Asia	Japan	Kansai University
Asia	Japan	Keio University
Asia	Japan	Kibi International University
Asia	Japan	Kobe University
Asia	Japan	Kumamoto University
Asia	Japan	Kwansei Gakuin University
Asia	Japan	Kyorin University
Asia	Japan	Meiji University
Asia	Japan	Meiji University (School of Information and Communication)
Asia	Japan	Meiji University (School of Political Science and Economics)
Asia	Japan	Mie University
Asia	Japan	Momoyama Gakuin University
Asia	Japan	Mukogawa Women's University
Asia	Japan	Musashino University
Asia	Japan	Nagasaki University of Foreign Studies
Asia	Japan	Nagoya University (NUPACE)
Asia	Japan	Nagoya City University
Asia	Japan	Nara Women's University
Asia	Japan	Onomichi City University
Asia	Japan	Osaka International University
Asia	Japan	Osaka University of Economics
Asia	Japan	Otemon Gakuin University
Asia	Japan	Rikkyo University
Asia	Japan	Sophia University
Asia	Japan	Tohoku University (Graduate School of Economics and Management)
Asia	Japan	Tohoku University (IPLA program)
Asia	Japan	Tokyo Keizai University
Asia	Japan	University of Fukui
Asia	Japan	University of Marketing and Distribution Sciences
Asia	Japan	Waseda University
Asia	Japan	Yokohama National University
Asia	Korea	Chosun University
Asia	Korea	Chung-Ang University
Asia	Korea	Dankook University
Asia	Korea	Dongseo University
Asia	Korea	Ewha Womans University
Asia	Korea	Hallym University
Asia	Korea	Handong Global University
Asia	Korea	Hannam University
Asia	Korea	Kangwon National University
Asia	Korea	Kongju National University
Asia	Korea	Kyung Hee University
Asia	Korea	Pukyong National University
Asia	Korea	Seoul National University
Asia	Korea	SolBridge International School of Business, Woosong University
Asia	Korea	Sookmyung Women's University
Asia	Korea	University of Seoul
Asia	Korea	Woosong University (Solbridge International Business School)
Asia	Korea	Yonsei University (Mirae Campus)
Asia	Mongolia	University of Finance and Economics
Asia	Singapore	Nanyang Polytechnic
Asia	China	Kunming University of Science and Technology
Asia	China	Hunan Normal University
Asia	Taiwan	Chien-hsin University of Science and Technology (UCH)
Asia	Taiwan	Mingchuan University
Asia	Taiwan	Nanhua University
Asia	Taiwan	National Yunlin University of Science and Technology
Asia	Taiwan	Vanung University, Taiwan
Asia	Thailand	Thammasat Business School - Thammasat University
Europe	Belgium	Hasselt University
Europe	Finland	Oulu University of Applied Sciences
Europe	Finland	Seinajoki University of Applied Sciences
Europe	France	Aix-Marseille University
Europe	France	IDRAC International School of Management
Europe	France	IPAG Business School
Europe	France	ISC Paris Business School
Europe	France	Sciences Po
Europe	France	Université Polytechinique Hauts de France
Europe	Germany	Friedrich- Alexander-Universitat Erlangen-Nurnberg (FAU), School of Business & Economics
Europe	Germany	Goethe University Frankfurt am Main, Faculty of Economics and Business Administration
Europe	Germany	Hochschule Trier, Trier University of Applied Sciences, Germany
Europe	Germany	Mannheim University
Europe	Germany	NEU-ULM University of Applied Sciences
Europe	Germany	Osnabrück University of Applied Sciences
Europe	Germany	Paderborn University
Europe	Germany	University of Augsburg
Europe	Germany	WHU-OTTO BEISHEIM School of Management
Europe	Italy	LUISS University
Europe	Norway	BI Norwegian School of Management
Europe	Russia	Far Eastern State Technical University
Europe	Russia	Khabarvork State Academy of Economics and law
Europe	Russia	National Research University Higher School of Economics
Europe	Russia	Vladivostok State University of Economics and Service
Europe	Spain	University of Barcelona
Europe	Sweden	University of Gothenburg
Europe	Sweden	Uppsala University - Department of Business Studies
Europe	Switzerland	Business School Lausanne
Europe	Switzerland	The University of Applied Sciences and Arts Northwestern Switzerland
Australia	Australia	LaTrobe University
