= Thuyloi University =

Public university in Hanoi, Vietnam

Coordinates: 21.007381°N 105.824519°E

Thuy Loi University (Vietnamese language: Đại học Thủy lợi) is a public university in Hanoi, Vietnam. It was established in 1959 as the Electricity Water Resources Academy, spun off from the Hanoi University of Technology.

Thuy Loi University has three campuses: the main campus in Hanoi, with a large campus in Ho Chi Minh City and one in Phan Rang–Tháp Chàm, Ninh Thuận Province. The university offers undergraduate and postgraduate programs in water resources management, dam construction, irrigation, flood control, environmental management, civil construction, and hydroelectricity.
