= Chiêu Thiền Pagoda =

Buddhist temple in Hanoi, Vietnam

- Chiêu Thiền tự 昭禪寺
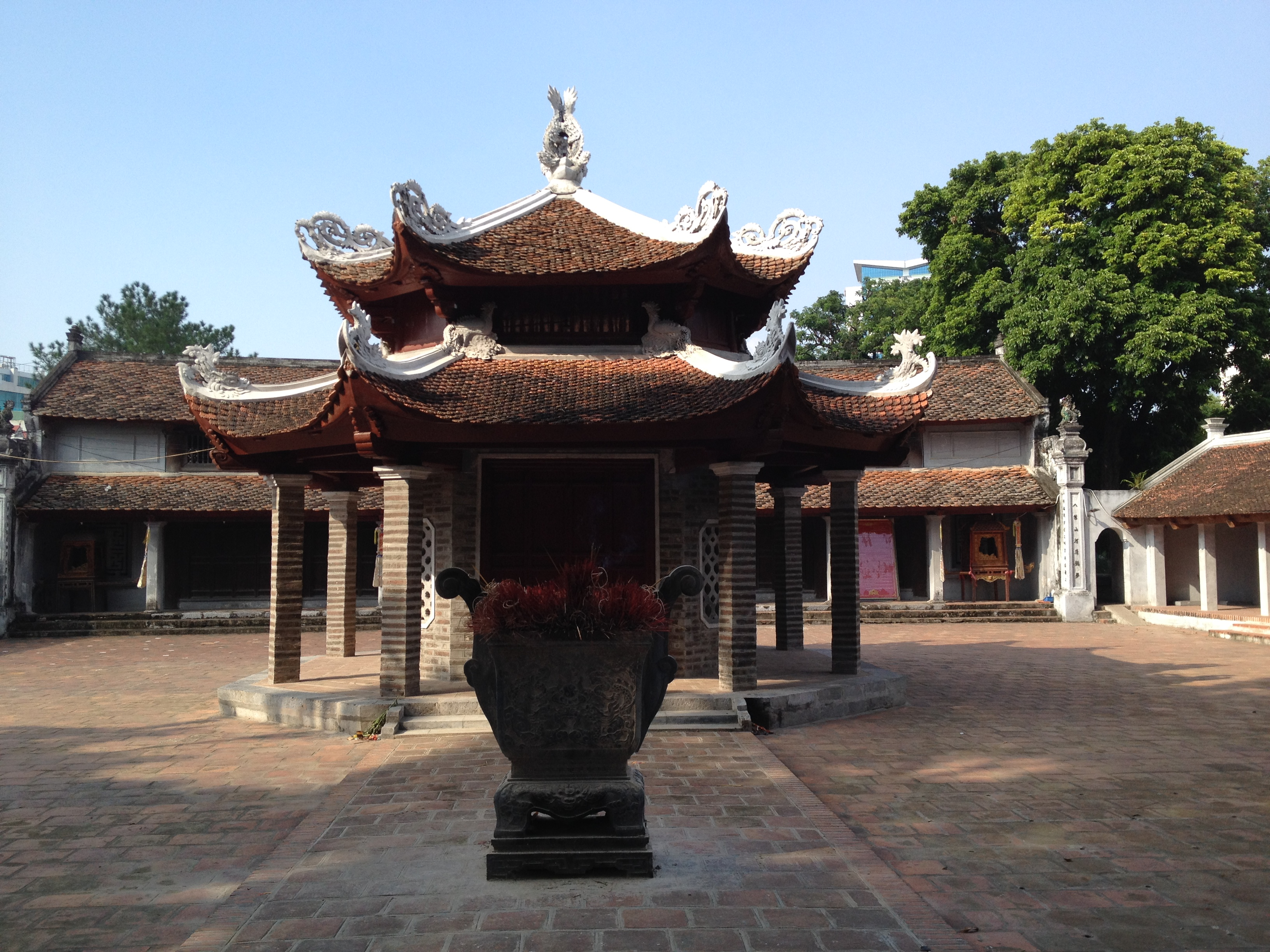
- The octagon house at the main hall.

Religion
- Affiliation: Buddhism

Location
- Location: No.116, Chùa Láng Street, (Note: Phố Chùa Láng.) Láng Ward, Hanoi

Architecture
- Completed: 12th century (by legend); 17th century (by records)

Chiêu Thiền Pagoda (Vietnamese: Chiêu Thiền tự, Hán Nôm: 昭禪寺) is a Buddhist temple in Kẻ Láng Village, (Note: Or K'lang in Middle-age Annamese language.) now Láng Ward of the capital Hanoi, Vietnam.

== History ==
Chiêu Thiền Pagoda is known in French as Pagode des Dames (meaning "Temple of the Ladies"). It worships Buddhist monk Từ Đạo Hạnh and was said that built by emperors Lý Anh Tông or Lý Thần Tông.

The space of Chiêu Thiền Pagoda (now Chùa Láng Street) was ever home to the first feature film of Vietnamese cinema Kim Vân Kiều, which was shot in 1923. In addition, this architectural work has also appeared in a number of short documentaries by French filmmakers.

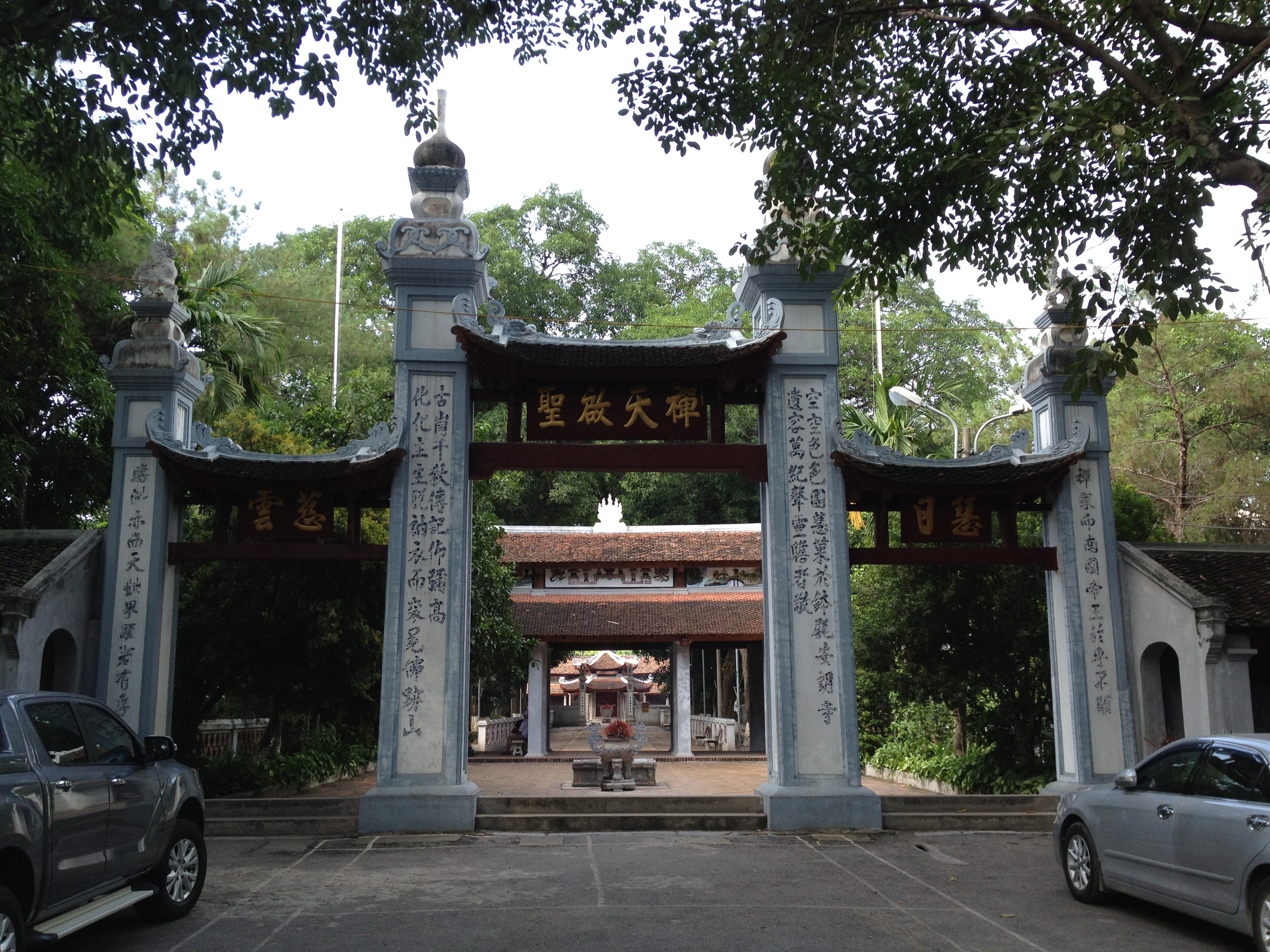
Tri-gateway...

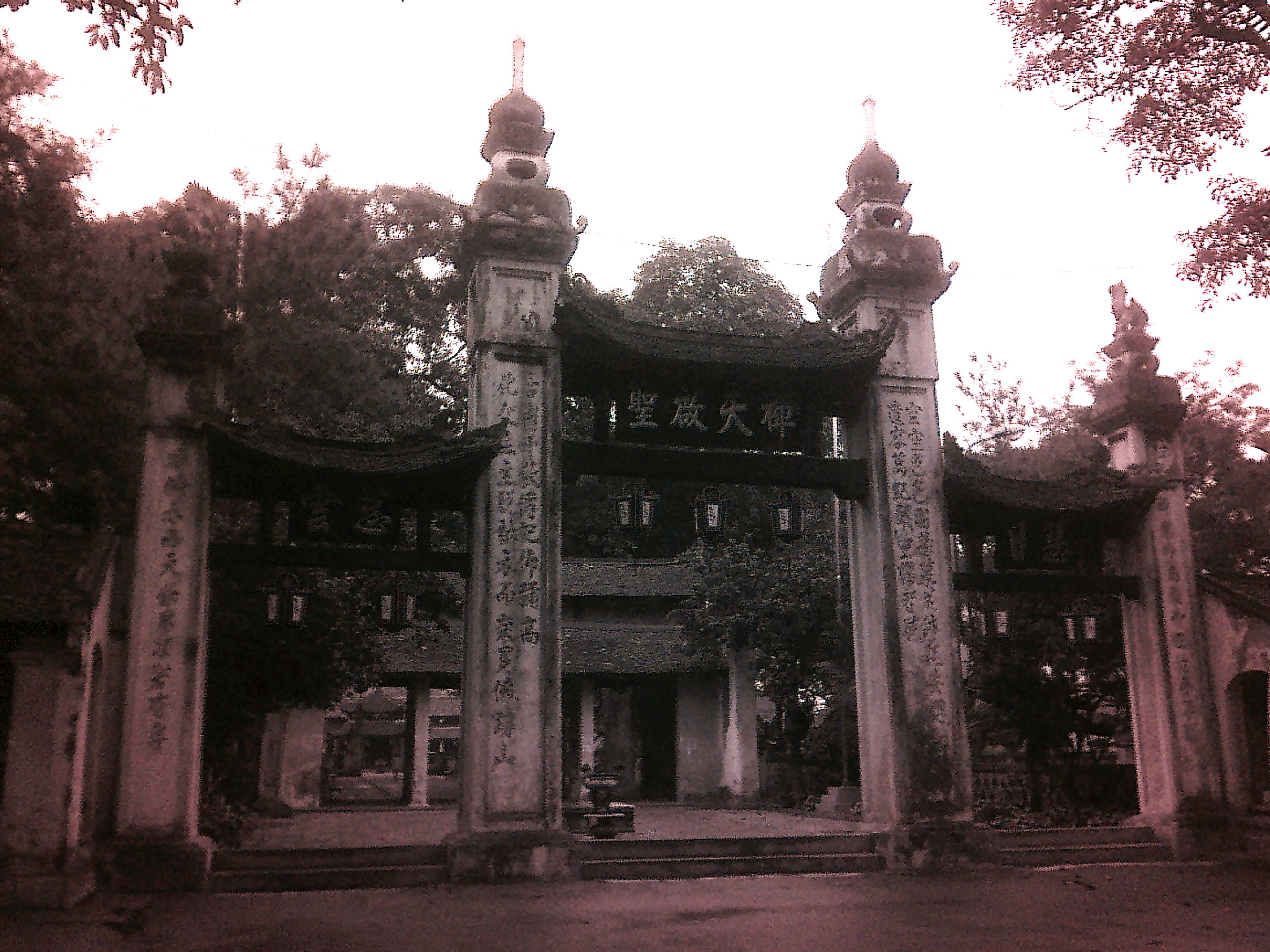
... of Chiêu Thiền Pagoda

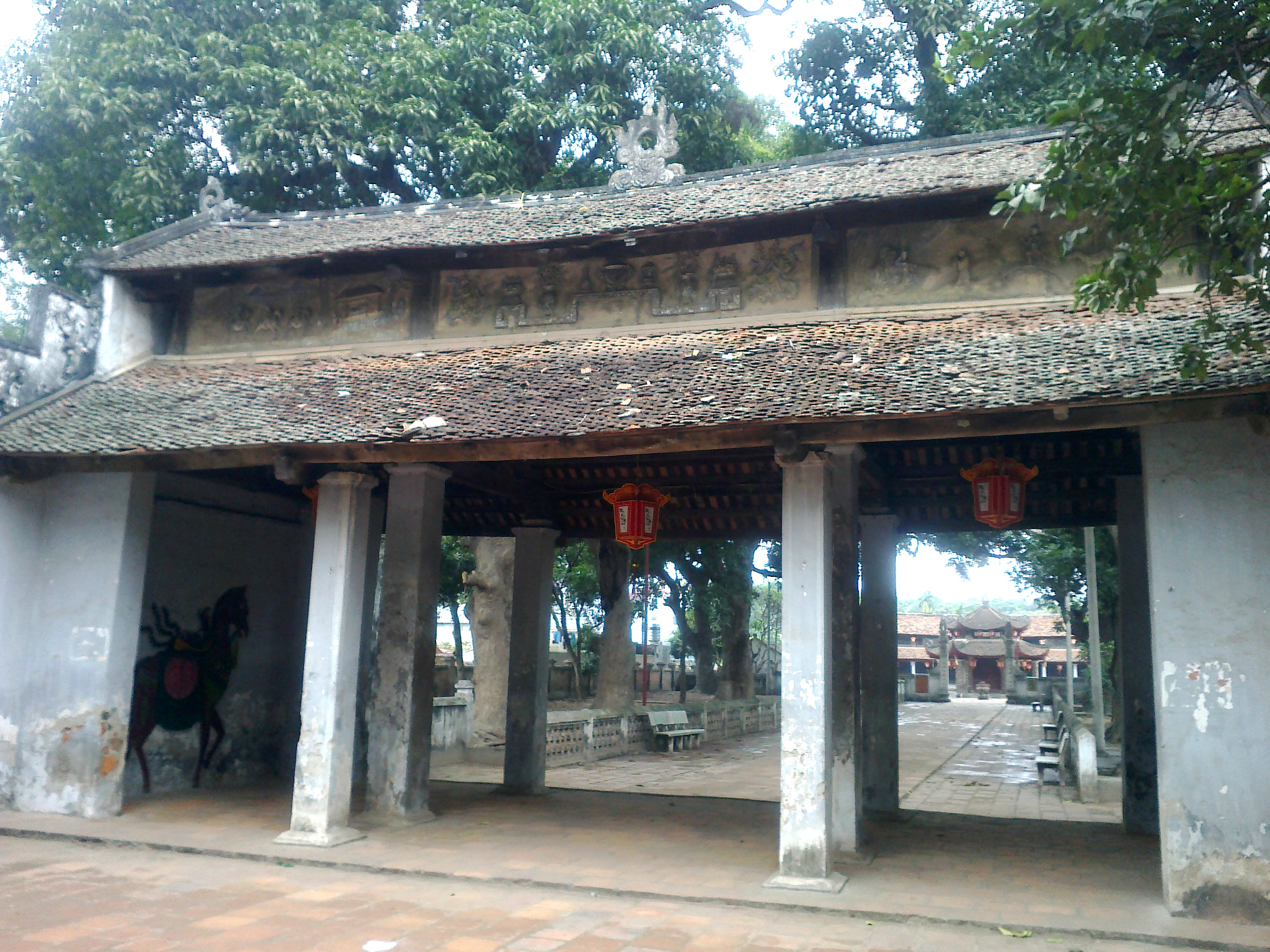
The second gate

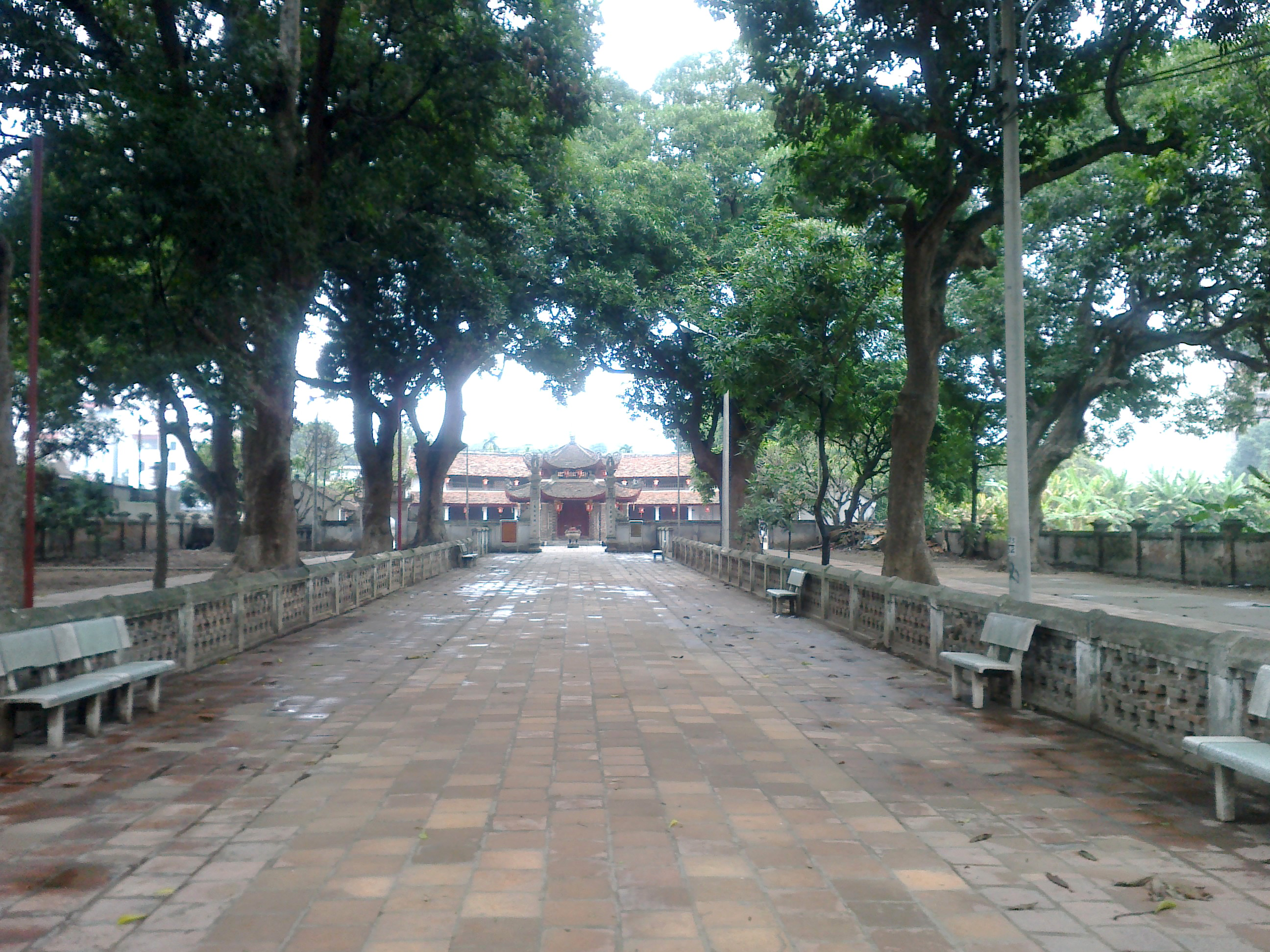
The entrance path and the third gate

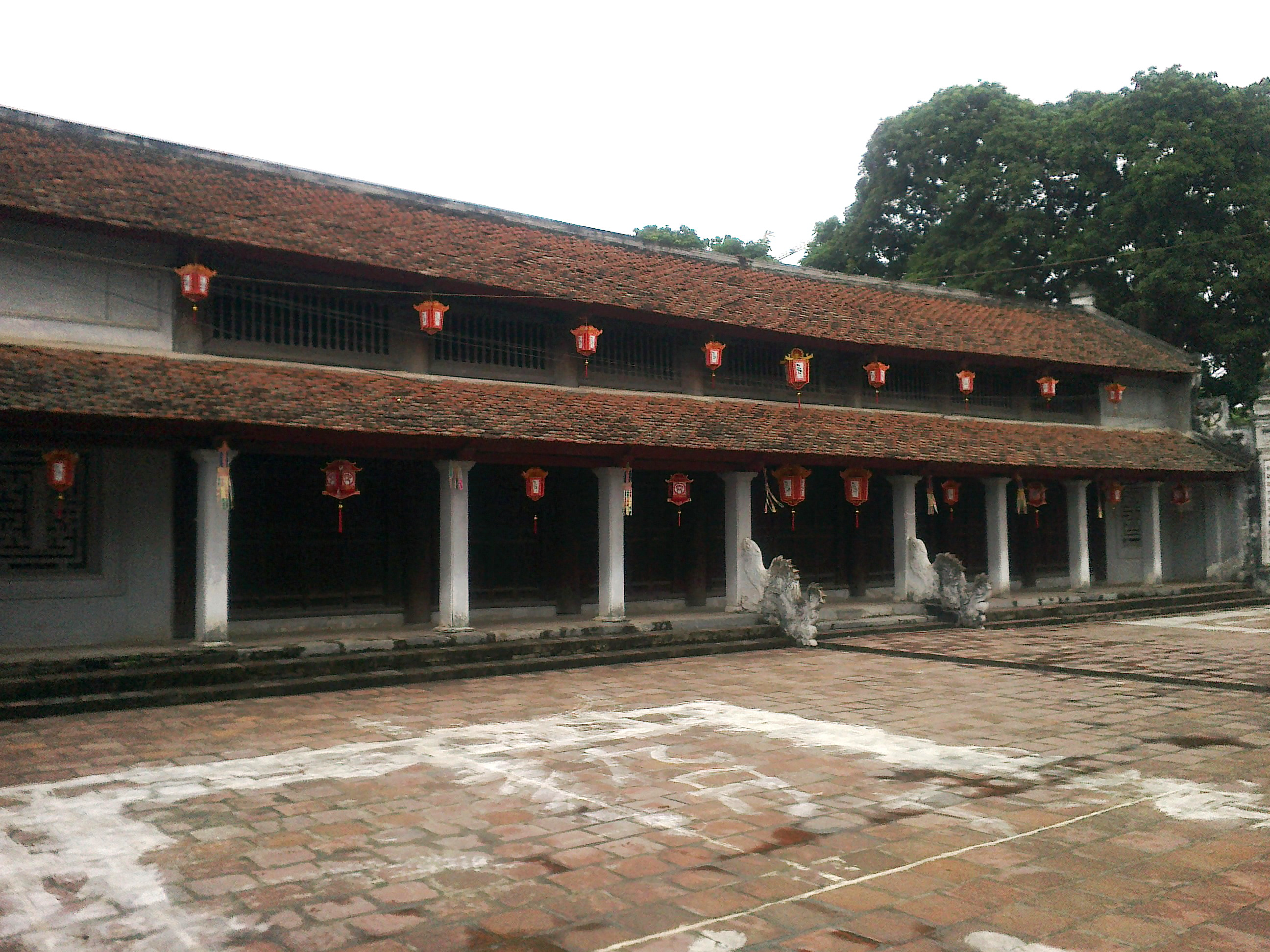
The main hall

== See also ==
- Láng
