= National Assembly Building of Vietnam =

Government building in Hanoi

National Assembly House
- Nhà Quốc hội
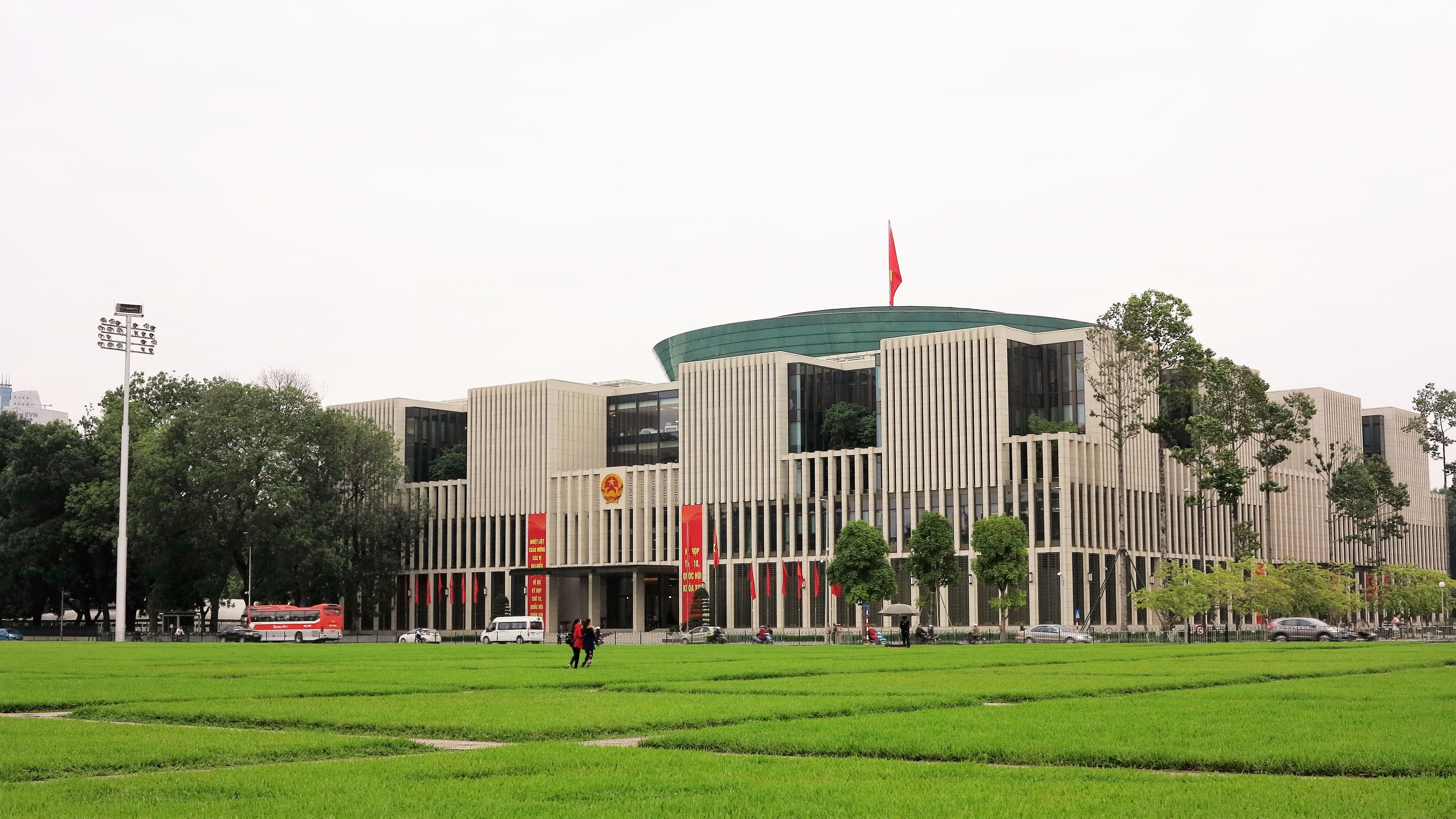
- The front of the building

General information
- Architectural style: Modern
- Location: 1, Độc Lập Road, Ba Đình Ward, Hanoi, Vietnam
- Coordinates: 21°02′14″N 105°50′15″E
- Construction started: October 12, 2009
- Completed: October 20, 2014; 12 years ago
- Cost: 6,838 billion VND
- Client: Ministry of Construction
- Owner: National Assembly of Vietnam

Height
- Height: 39 m (128 ft)

Technical details
- Size: 102 m × 102 m (335 ft × 335 ft)
- Floor count: 7 (5 stories, 2 underground)
- Floor area: 63,240 m^{2} (680,700 sq ft)
- Lifts/elevators: 12

Design and construction
- Architects: Meinhard Von Gerkan, Nikolaus Goetze, Dirk Heller and Joern Ortmann
- Architecture firm: gmp International GmbH
- Engineer: Inros Lackner AG
- Main contractor: Sông Đà Construction Corporation
- Awards: 2014 Vietnam's National Architecture Award

Other information
- Parking: 550 spaces

The National Assembly Building of Vietnam (Vietnamese: Tòa nhà Quốc hội Việt Nam), officially the National Assembly House (Nhà Quốc hội) and also known as the New Ba Đình Hall (Hội trường Ba Đình mới), is a public building located on Ba Đình Square across from the Ho Chi Minh Mausoleum in Hanoi, Vietnam. Construction started on October 12, 2009, and finished on October 20, 2014. The building is the meeting place of the National Assembly of Vietnam, and hosts major conferences held by the Communist Party of Vietnam.

This building is the largest office complex built in Vietnam after the reunification of the country. The Building covers an area of 63,000 square meters, and is 39 meters in height. The building can accommodate up to 80 meetings and has capacity for more than 2,500 people.

The old Ba Đình Hall was demolished in 2008 to make room for the new National Assembly House. Archaeological remains of the old imperial city of Hanoi, Thăng Long, were found on the site, causing construction of the building to be delayed.

The proposed project took 15 years (1999–2014) from the initial concept to the inauguration. The project attracted attention and debates in the country's mass media concerning the construction site and conservation of Ba Đình Hall. The project led to the largest archaeological excavations in Vietnam at the site of Imperial Citadel of Thăng Long. The German architecture design consultant company, gmp International GmbH, was awarded the Vietnam's National Architecture Award by the Vietnam Architect Society in 2014.

== Background ==
Ideas for a new National Assembly building were floated around since the Democratic Republic of Vietnam (North Vietnam) established control of Hanoi following the 1954 Geneva Accords. In March 1960, the government sent a hundred experts, officials and workers to Beijing for nine months in order to learn more about design and construction, procure materials, and study the Ten Great Buildings of Beijing which had just opened the previous year, especially the Great Hall of the People.

Meanwhile, experts from China collaborated with Vietnamese architects Nguyễn Hữu Tiềm, Hoàng Như Tiếp, Ngô Huy Quỳnh and others to design a new legislative building on the site of the colonial-era Hoàng Hoa Thám horse racetrack. With the expectation that this land (now Quần Ngựa Sports Palace) would be devoted to the new National Assembly building, the joint Sino-Vietnamese team submitted their completed plans to the Ministry of Construction. They then reported to then-President Hồ Chí Minh and other state leaders. Hồ Chí Minh was concerned that the country was too poor for a new legislative building and instead proposed a temporary structure to be used by the National Assembly until reunification, after which a grander, more beautiful legislative building would be built. Upon the return of the experts to China, the Vietnamese leaders announced their agreement with the idea but the domestic and international situation of the country meant that construction was not feasible.

The destruction caused by Operation Rolling Thunder meant that the plans for the new assembly building were cancelled. Nguyễn Cao Luyện and a number of other architects were commissioned to build Ba Đình Hall, which was completed in 1963. Because it was only meant as a temporary structure, it was modest in size.

After reunification and the Đổi Mới reforms, Prime Minister Võ Văn Kiệt proposed building a new legislative hall on a grander scale to represent Vietnam's new era of development. Around 1998–1999, the government ordered the Ministry of Construction to prepare and build a large and modern construction center. The Ministry proposed the site of 18 Hoàng Diệu Street as it was an expansive, undeveloped piece of land with only Ba Đình Hall having been built there. When the issue was brought to the National Assembly, it was suggested that a new legislative building should be built, because other countries had dedicated structures for their legislatures while the National Assembly of Vietnam had still continued to convene in the "temporary" Ba Dinh Hall This led to the idea of making a new National Assembly House attached to the New Ba Dinh Hall as the National Conference Center.

== Development ==
=== Initial stages ===
==== 2002–2007 ====
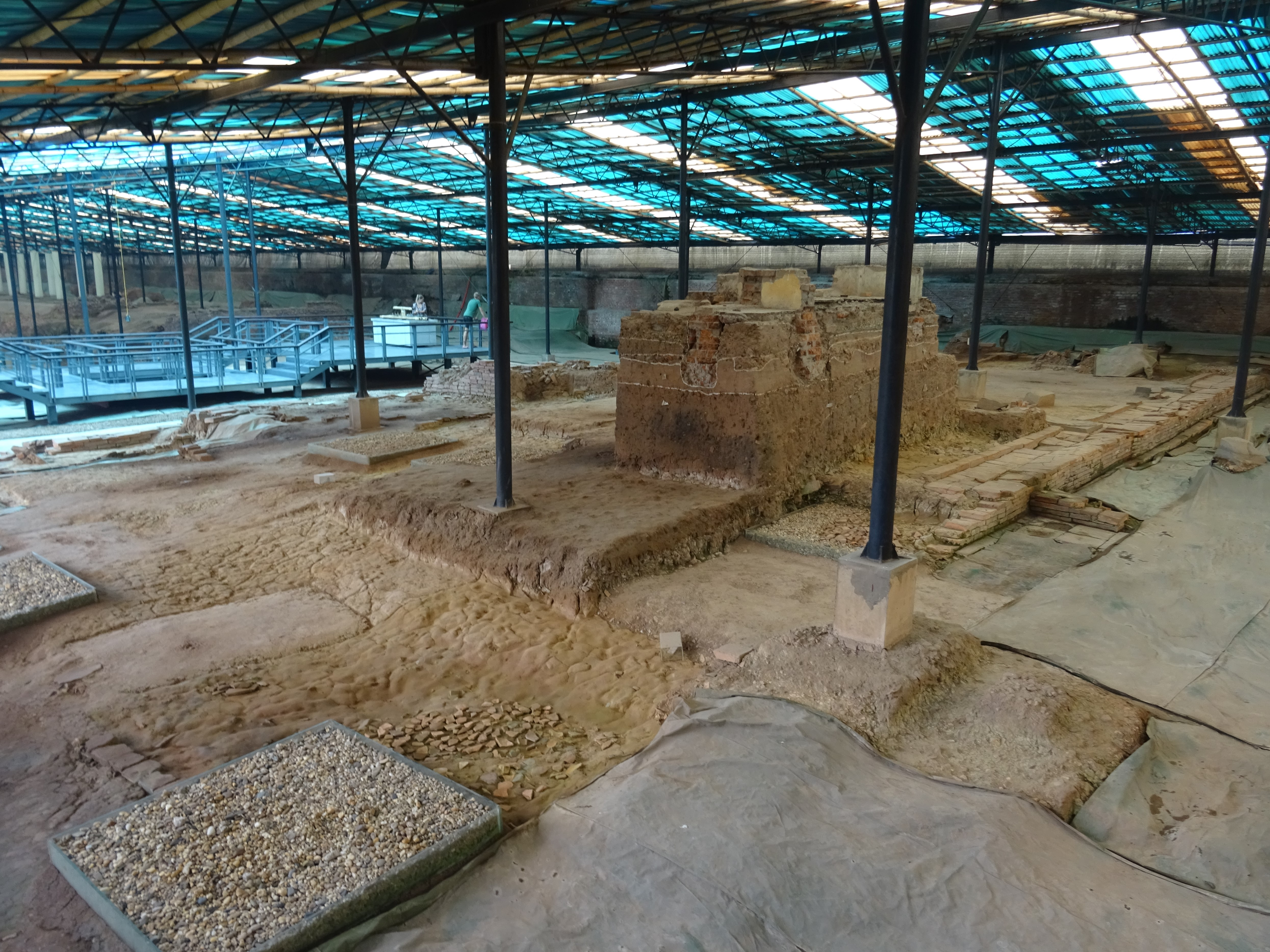
18 Hoàng Diệu, the largest and most valuable archaeological site in Vietnam

In October 2002, the government established the Steering Committee for Construction of the National Assembly House and Ba Dinh Hall (new) initiated by then-Deputy Prime Minister Nguyễn Tấn Dũng. The Prime Minister at the time, Phan Văn Khải, approved the project feasibility report. At the end of 2002, the chosen plan was to build the new National Assembly House to the right of Ba Đình Hall, on 18 Hoang Dieu Street with access to Hoàng Văn Thụ Street and Independence Street. Under this plan, Ba Đình Hall would be preserved.

In 2003, when surveying the construction site of the National Assembly at 18 Hoang Dieu, the land was cleared to prepare for construction and Vietnam Institute of Archaeology conducted archaeological excavations in accordance with the law on cultural heritage. The 2003 archaeological announcement conference drew the attention of public opinion and scientific researchers around the archaeological site at the very site of the intention to build a new Parliament building. This is the largest excavation of the archaeological history 6 was announced, with an area of 14.000m^{2}. Excavation of this area lasted 1 year with 14 excavations, found millions of extremely valuable antiques and relics. This site is located in the right place for the construction of the National Assembly building as planned.

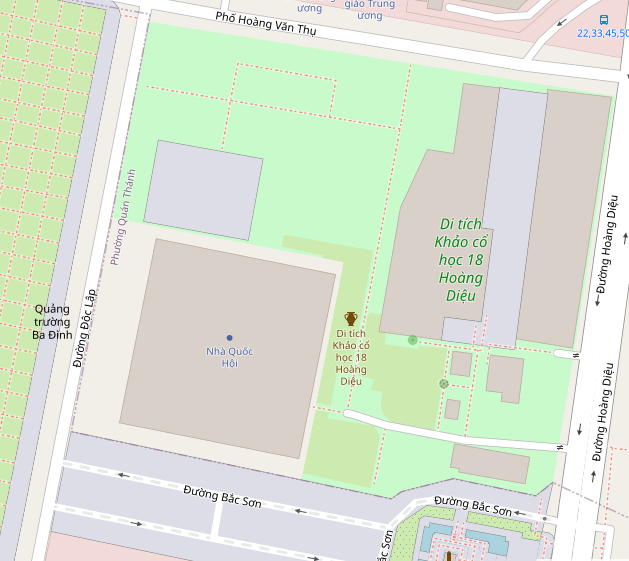
Location of the National Assembly House and 18 Hoàng Diệu. The original design of the National Assembly House was located near Hoàng Văn Thụ Street and included the area of the entire archaeological site.

On the morning of September 26, 2003, an extraordinary workshop was held at the National Center for Social Sciences and Humanities in Hanoi to discuss the significance and propose solutions for conserving and promoting the historical value of the National Assembly building site and the Ba Dinh area. For the first time, a palace from the Ly–Tran dynasties and an Imperial Citadel from the Ly dynasty were discovered in an almost intact state. This discovery became the most controversial topic of the workshop: one side advocated preserving the archaeological site and halting construction plans, while the other supported retaining only select areas and continuing with the development of the National Assembly building.

In addition to the academic debate, there was also intense discussion among National Assembly members, government officials, Party leaders at the time, and retired leaders. On 25 September 2003, the Standing Committee of the National Assembly reviewed the design proposal for the National Assembly House and the new Ba Dinh Hall. However, the meeting failed to reach a conclusion due to issues arising from an ongoing archaeological excavation at the proposed construction site. The decision on whether to proceed with building the National Assembly House on the planned land was ultimately referred to the CPV Politburo.

Then-Construction Minister Nguyễn Hồng Quân was also concerned about the monuments. The ministry proposed that an alternative location should be found for the assembly hall, but many former and current officials opposed this plan, as they felt that it should be located within the administrative center of Ba Đình. Another factor that complicated matters was the need for a large building to host the APEC Vietnam 2006 conference. The Politburo decided to suspend the project in October 2003, instead focusing on excavating the Imperial Citadel of Thăng Long and building the Vietnam National Convention Center.

When the time came to restart the project, several alternative sites were proposed, including 37 Hùng Vương Street, the Vietnam Military History Museum; the former location of Cột Cờ Stadium (behind the Ministry of Defence on Nguyễn Tri Phương Street); the area to the left of Ba Đình Hall (behind General Võ Nguyên Giáp's residence and the Ministry of Foreign Affairs); and various other locations. However, none of these options received support.

==== 2007–2009 ====
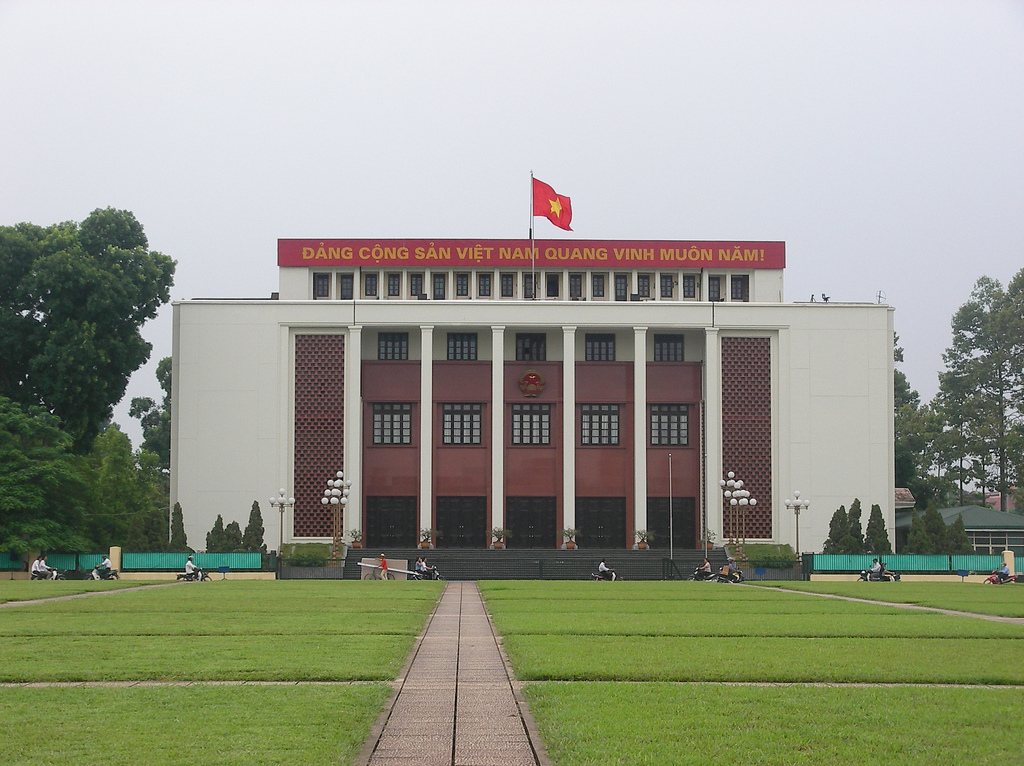
The facade of Ba Đình Hall, which was torn down in 2008 to make room for the new assembly hall

In April 2007, the National Assembly issued a resolution choosing Lot D in Ba Đình as the location of the new hall. Domestic and international consultants would be recruited to plan and design the building. Despite its historical status, Ba Đình Hall was planned to be demolished.

The demolition plan was quite controversial among the public and the press. Most notably, Võ Văn Kiệt wrote to Thanh Niên and Võ Nguyên Giáp wrote to Đại Đoàn Kết for the preservation of the historical hall, carefully scrutinize the plan, and find an alternative site for the new building. Both also sent letters to national leaders for the same purpose.

In July 2007, the Government established the Steering Committee for the construction of the National Assembly House headed by standing Deputy Prime Minister Nguyễn Sinh Hùng. Nguyen Sinh Hung decided that the organization and dismantlement of Ba Dinh Hall and the architectural works in the campus of Ba Dinh Hall should be completed in November 2007.

In May 2008, the Prime Minister issued Document No. 734 / TTg-KTN approving the selection of an architectural plan for the National Assembly House, and started the process of appointing a contractor for the design and construction of the project.

Between 2008 and 2009, the renowned firms gmp International GmbH - Inros Lackner AG conducted the adjustment and completion of the detailed design of the National Assembly project to carry out construction.

=== Design options ===
==== Competition ====
Due to the large size and complexity of the project, Prime Minister Võ Văn Kiệt requested that a competition be held to choose the architectural plans. 25 contest plans from 22 design organizations in 12 countries were submitted to a judging committee consisting of leading Vietnamese experts and four foreign members nominated by the International Architects Association. Plan No. 17 from the German firm gmp International GmbH won the first prize. Experts in the field of architecture said that the contest was held unprofessionally, not following the standards of international competition for works of the caliber of the National Assembly, leading to quantity and quality. The projects participating in the contest are unsatisfactory.

From 2 to 15 September 15, 2007, the Vietnam National Convention Center hosted an exhibition of plans for the new hall to solicit opinions from residents and experts in the field of design and architecture to study and choose the most optimal design option. The exhibition displayed 17 potential options. Deputy Minister of Construction Trần Ngọc Chính, who served as the chairman of the selection council, said that out of those options, one would be used while the other four would get consolation prizes. After being displayed for a period of two weeks to get people's opinions, the Selection Council held a seminar of the Vietnam Architects Association and other professional associations to provide additional suggestions for the selected judgment. The results were submitted to the government for final decision.

Debate over the architectural options continued to take place in the media. Many people felt, especially Vietnamese architects, that none of the 17 options were optimal and met the requirements. However, option L787 dominated the vote among exhibition attendees and won the contract.

==== Selected design ====
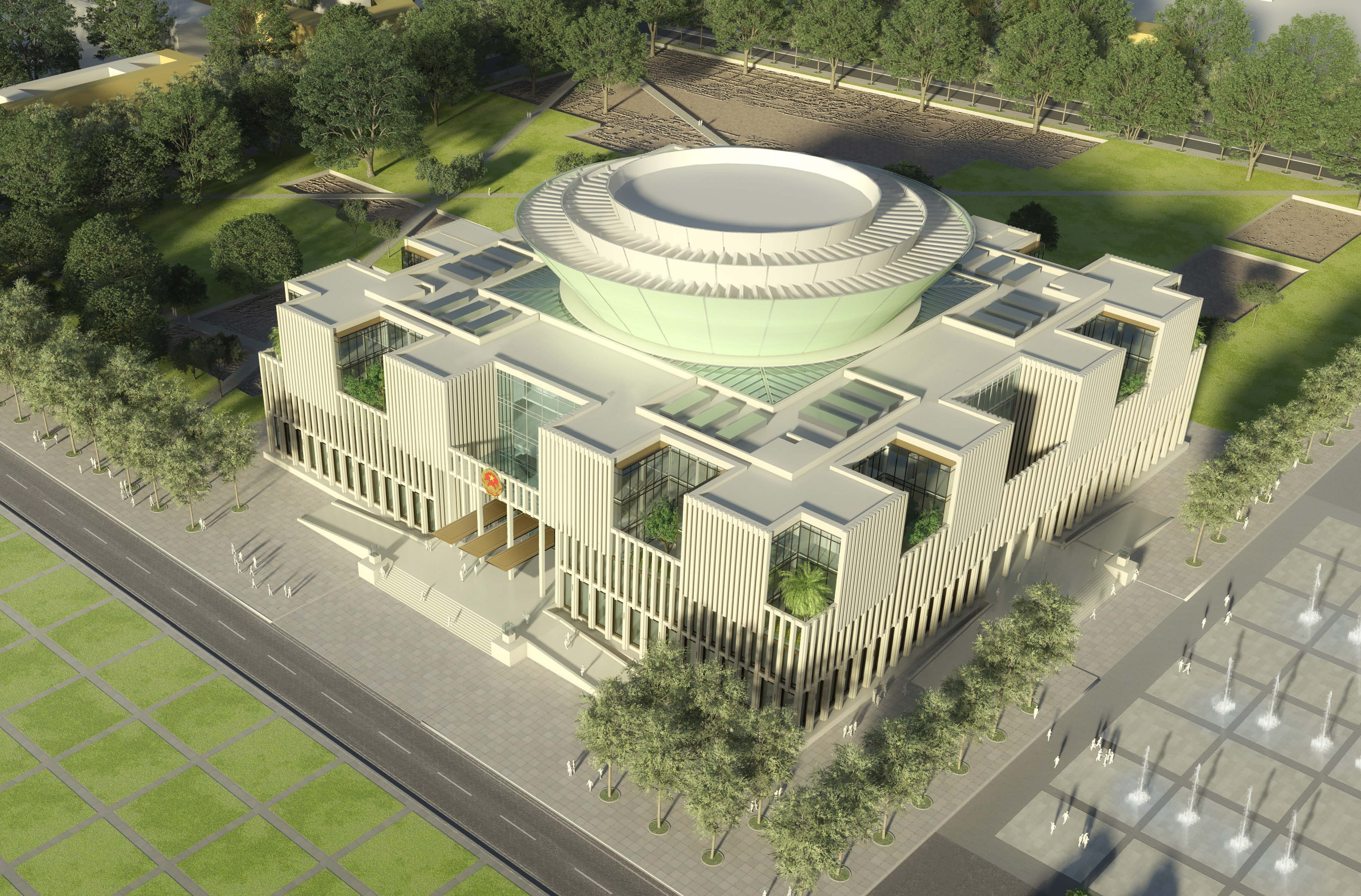
New Assembly House mockup after the area was adjusted to 102m square

In 2008, the winning proposal from gmp International GmbH was submitted to the Assembly. Minister of Construction Nguyễn Hồng Quân said "[this plan] has reached a high level of consensus from the Council of Architects with over 30 members, the Prime Minister agrees, and the people gave it the highest amount of votes in the three regional exhibitions". Although the majority of members of the Standing Committee of the National Assembly agreed with the architectural plan, some still wanted various changes in the design's details.

At last, the architectural plan of the National Assembly House was selected as the one to win the National Assembly House Architectural Design Competition (2007) with some upgrades and adjustments such as: narrowing the size to 102m × 102m, ensuring the reverse position is not more than 20m to the East of Ba Dinh Hall campus, the maximum construction density at Lot D is 40% combined with the construction of auxiliary works for relic conservation at 18 Hoang Dieu. The Ministry of Construction appointed A-winning design consultant, Gmp International GmbH and Inros Lackner AG (Federal Republic of Germany) to set up "Construction investment project and construction design of National Assembly House".

Architect Dirk Heller representing the group of authors of architectural design projects said that "the most difficult thing is that everyone wants to talk in, want to put that in the building" and when the authors have to put in design changes a lot, "developing and adopting a new one, another is a process".

=== Construction ===
On 12 October 2009, Prime Minister Nguyễn Tấn Dũng announced the commencement of construction. The government initially planned to complete it in 2010, by the Millennial Anniversary of Hanoi. However, due to the prolonged modification of the architectural plan, the project was expected to be completed and put into use in the third quarter of 2012 when construction started.

The investor of the project is the Ministry of Construction. Joint venture gmp International GmbH - Inros Lackner AG (Federal Republic of Germany) as the main consultant. The sub-consultants are Vietnam Construction Consulting Corporation (VNCC) and Vietnam Construction Design and Investment Consulting Joint Stock Company (CDC). The lead of the project is architect Nikolaus Goetze (director of gmp International GmbH) and engineer Otmar Haas (project manager Inros Lackner AG). Main contractors include:

- Song Da Corporation: Basement, foundation, whole body and finishing works
- Hanoi Construction Corporation (HANCORP) and Construction and Infrastructure Development Corporation (LICOGI): construction pile
- Consultant and Inspection Joint Stock Company of Construction Technology and Equipment (CONINCO): construction supervision

The project employed a total of 65 contractors and was completed after 2.5 million working days for technicians, skilled workers and workers. Many construction technologies used in the project were unprecedented in civil construction works in the country such as a crane with a lifting capacity of 1250 tons which installed 8 steel columns that support the entire main meeting room. Each steel column has a special structure that is 15m high and weighs 77 tons.

The National Assembly building is designed as a "smart building", so it uses many state-of-the-art technologies and equipment imported from abroad. Energy saving, using solar energy, saving water, and other factors were considered in the building's design. Various fire protection systems were installed, such as a smoke escape system, intelligent heat, when the central control system receives an emergency signal such as a fire, the entire door will automatically open, the smoke-blocking system will drop. Smoke curtain system with very large size 5m × 6m made of special materials, able to prevent smoke, fire but still ensure for people to run out. Part of the glass installed outside the building has a color that matches the landscape and serves as a one-way mirror. For the first time in Vietnam, each glass plate was processed individually, clearly shown at the bottom of the main meeting room, covered with herringbone-style glass with many curved radii.

The National Assembly House's de jure inauguration ceremony was not held but the House was officially put into use directly from October 20, 2014, at the Opening Ceremony of the 8th Session of the 13th National Assembly of Vietnam.

== Architecture ==
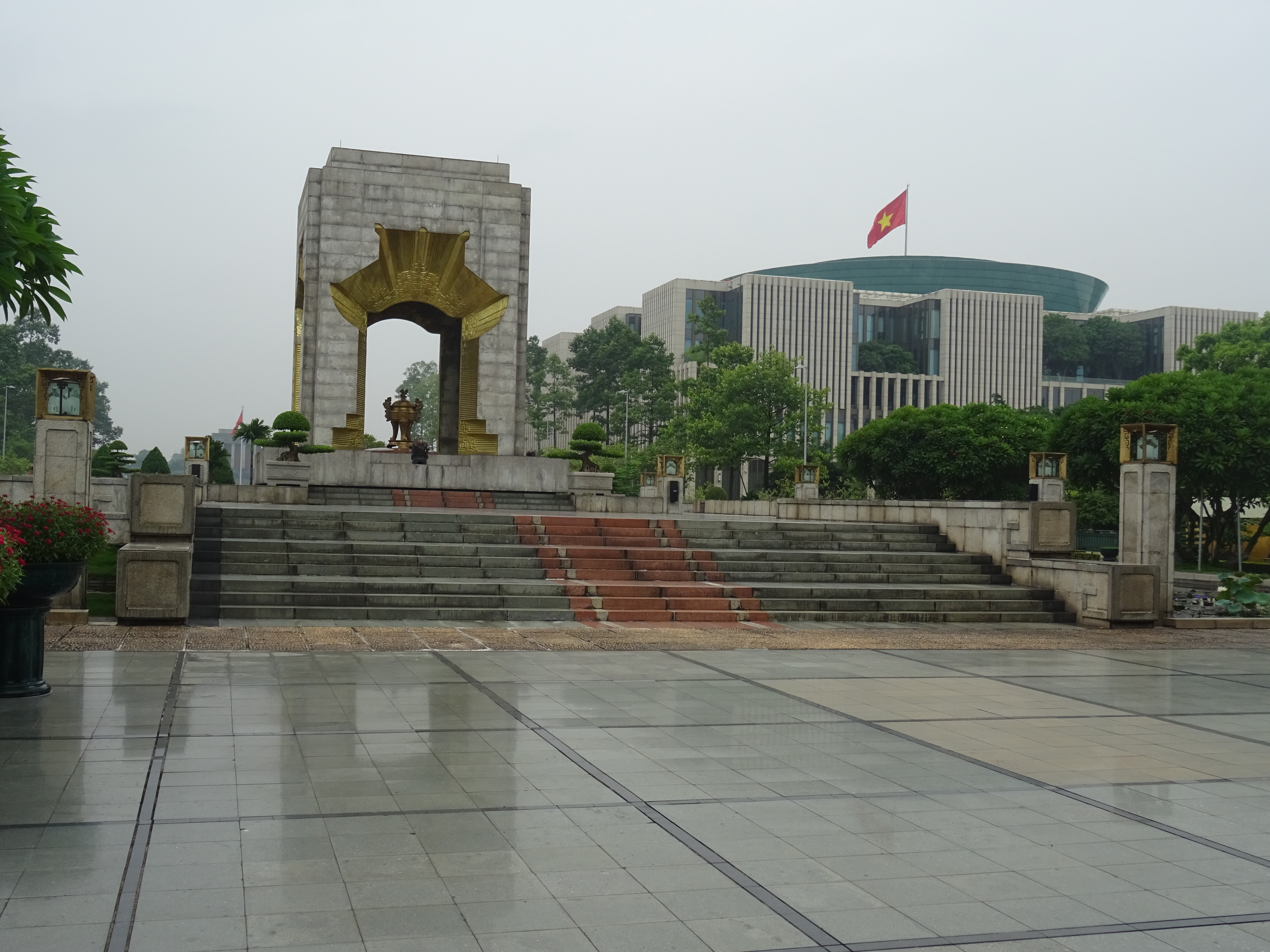
National Assembly House as seen from Bắc Sơn Monument

The total ground for the construction of the National Assembly House in Ba Dinh political center (about 22 ha) was bounded as follows:

- North side on Hoàng Văn Thụ Street
- South side on Lot E of Điện Biên Phủ Street
- East side on Hoàng Diệu Street, abutting the Imperial Citadel of Thăng Long
- West side on Independence Street and Ba Đình Square

The hall is located on the corner of Independence and Bắc Sơn streets. Bắc Sơn Street is designed to be in front of the Square and Bắc Sơn Monument.

=== Symbolism ===
The building's stylized symbol is used on the official logo of the National Assembly.

The National Assembly House is in the shape of a cube. The square ground symbolizes the "earth" and "mother" while the circular main meeting room in the middle represents "heaven" and "father". These two architectural blocks can also be seen as the image of bánh chưng and bánh giầy.

The National Assembly meeting room in the middle that extends from the bottom to the roof is placed on eight circular columns surrounding the main hall. The wall is tilted outward like a crown. The building is covered with transparent glass to represent the highest power agency of the state but also the elected body, to be closer to the people, and at the same time expressing the meaning of publicity and transparency of the Assembly.

=== Space usage ===
The building consists of five stories and two underground floors containing 540 rooms, with a total height of 39 metres (128 ft) and floor area of 63,240 square metres (680,700 sq ft). The building has two main blocks: the meeting room in the middle of the circle and the block surrounding the square. The National Assembly House has a total of more than 80 large and small meeting rooms, including two large halls and two main meeting rooms: the National Assembly Meeting Room (named Diên Hồng after the Diên Hồng Conference) and meeting rooms of the Standing Committee. National Assembly (named Tan Trao after the National Congress of Tan Trao), naming was proposed by delegate Duong Trung Quoc.

There are two entrances to the building, one main hall facing the west, Independence Street (on the side of Ba Dinh Square) and a hall facing Bac Son Street with a large yard for outdoor ceremonies. Next, at the bottom of the conference room is the Hall as an open space. The hall has a welcoming function as well as a space for high-level ceremonies. From the hall to the building, the two sides are two systems of 12 escalators running from the first floor to the third floor. The other floors must use elevators including 10 lifts and 2 lifts for disabled people. Corridor of the same design floors. The glass roof forms a sky well, taking in natural light around the central meeting room.

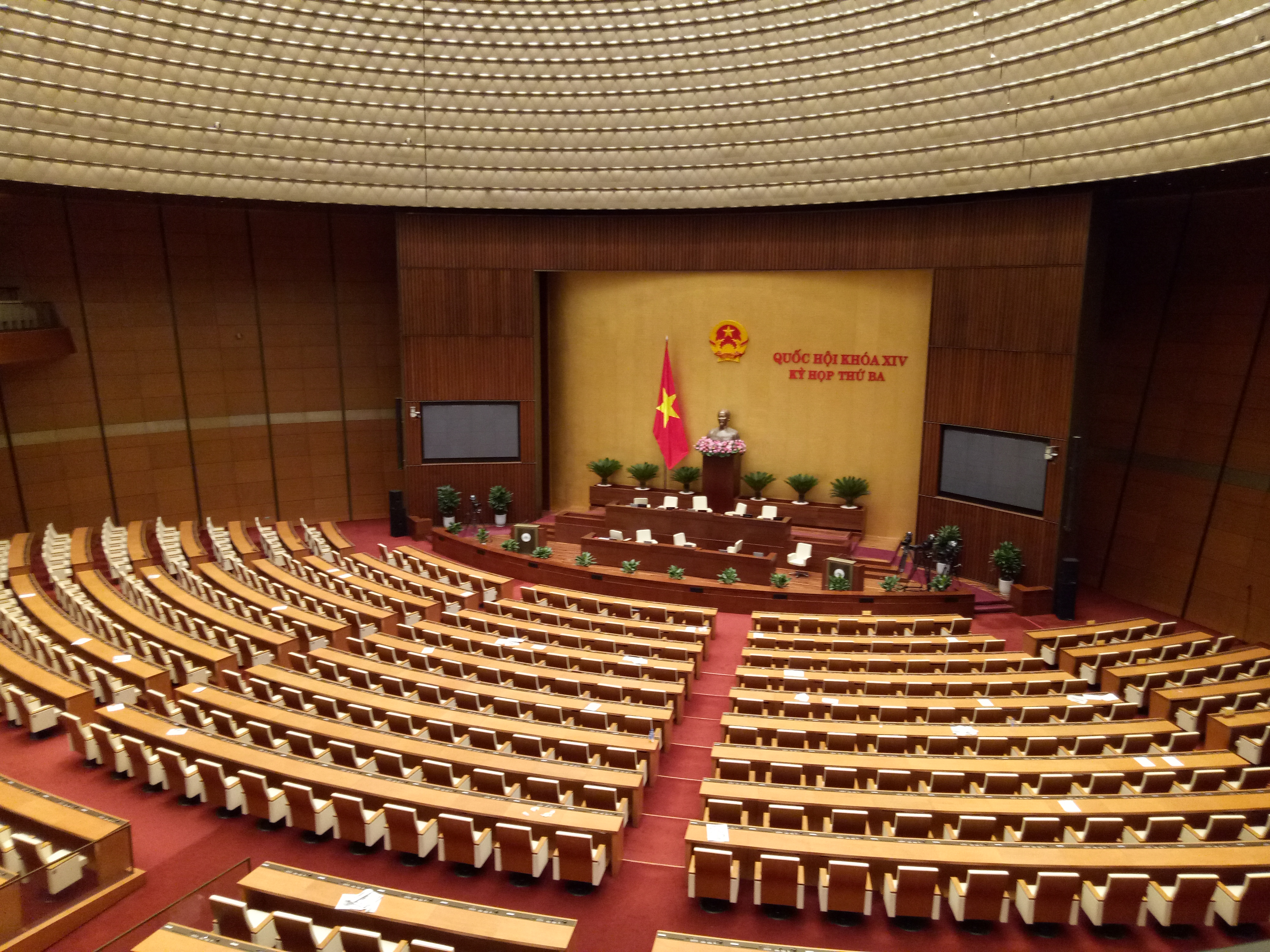
The Diên Hồng Hall - the major meeting hall of the building

==== Diên Hồng Hall ====
Diên Hồng Hall or Diên Hồng Room consists of an elevated room placed in the middle of the building with a circular floor and walls tilting outward. The floor has a diameter of 44m, the ceiling 54m, and the roof 60m.

The hall is supported by 8 concrete columns, of which the volume of hardened steel is about 640 tons. Each column is 15 m long and weighs 80 tons each. When building the column, a crane with a lifting capacity of 1,250 tons was used. The 8-column I-shaped steel column system also functions to reduce the impact of the earthquake.

There are 604 seats in the hall for the members of the National Assembly as well as 339 seats for the press, and other guests and attendees. The conference room table is arranged in an arc shape, in the direction of the central stage. The Presidency area is arranged with two rows of tables, each row of 5 seats, the middle seat of the Chairman of the National Assembly is placed higher. The two sides are the area for standing members of the National Assembly and government members.

==== Tân Trào Room ====
The Tan Trao room serves as the meeting place of the Standing Committee of the National Assembly and is located on the second floor in the east wing. It is 6m high and has an area of 600 m^{2}. The room features a 6-screen system for delegates to easily observe assembly sessions. All electronic equipment, sound and light systems are located and imported from abroad.

==== Press room ====
According to the original design and concept, the press room was to be located on the B1 floor of the National Assembly with about 300 seats. This design is judged by the media and reporters to be too narrow compared to the need for use. Even group meeting rooms do not have enough seats for reporters to follow the sessions. The number of domestic journalists and some foreign news agencies and news agencies registered to work is up to 500 people. The Office of the National Assembly proposed a plan to divide into two press centers, one in the press conference room on the B1 floor of the new National Assembly building; the other is in the Office of the National Assembly, at 37 Hung Vuong.

Right on the first day of working at the new National Assembly House, reporters of the newspapers got together sign a petition to the Office of the National Assembly, requesting more conditions for the press in the process, especially delegate access during breaks.

==== Other dimensions ====
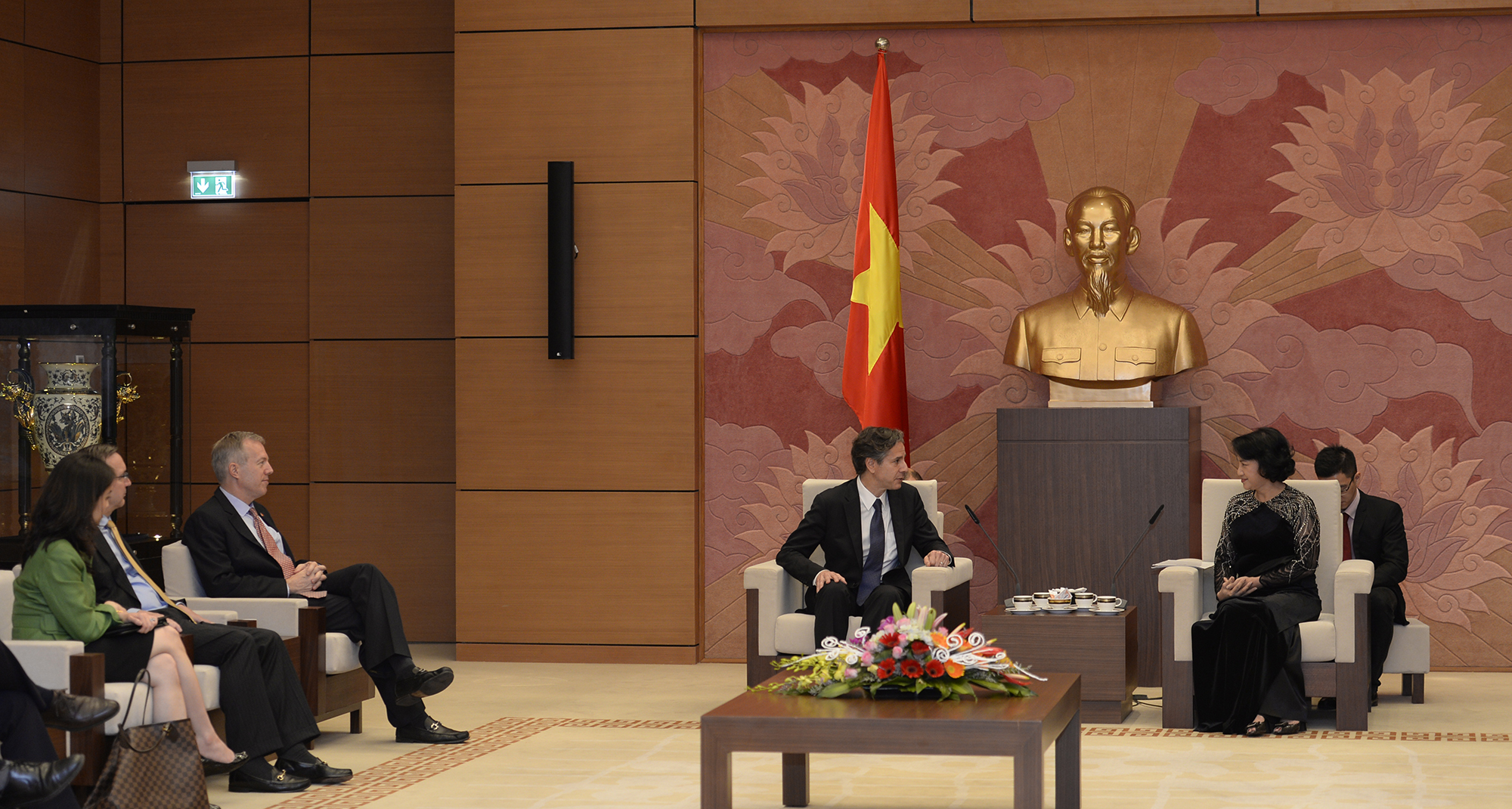
International Receiving Room

Other spaces in the building include:

- Working area of senior leaders of the National Assembly (5th floor, east)
- Working area, meeting of Ethnic Council and 9 Committees and assisting cases
- Office of the National Assembly leader
- Reception hall (Reception hall, international living room, conference room, reception room, domestic people) (1st floor)
- Traditional Chamber of Parliament (1st floor)

Library of Congress has the capacity to serve 200 readers. The reading room has an area of 500 m^{2}, is designed according to open reading room standards, with wifi coverage. The reading room is divided into 5 functional areas such as: National Assembly deputies area, press area, computer area, Readers study area, reading area, general study.

Banquet room (1st floor, north) can hold a buffet for 800–1000 guests, which can be divided into 3 separate rooms. A small banquet room for about 20 guests and a system of service rooms. The kitchen system of the National Assembly's kitchen can ensure the capacity to serve more than 1,000 meals.

In the basement, there is an exhibition area equivalent to an archeological museum called The Archaeological Discoveries under the National Assembly House on a total area of nearly 3,700 square meters.

==== Side works ====
The building has an underground parking area of 3 basements with a capacity of 550 cars with an area of over 17,000 m^{2}.

A tunnel connects the National Assembly House and the Headquarters of the Ministry of Foreign Affairs (1 Tôn Thất Đàm street) 60m long, with two separate pedestrian and car sections.

=== Furniture ===
Dien Hong Room consists of 2 floors, the front has 2 large screens of 100 inch size. Room using 1,200 m2 wooden wall; about 4,100 m2 metal ceiling. On the meeting table of delegates is attached modern electronic submersible joystick, which clearly states the functions of each key such as: speaking, voting, agreeing, disagreeing, with language keys, score card slot list and headphones. The entire wooden table top of the meeting room is manufactured in Vietnam. Tầng 1 của phòng họp được lắp đặt 604 ghế ngồi họp của đại biểu. The chairs, variants of the Sensó RT, are exclusively designed by Figueras International Seating Company for the National Assembly House and manufactured in Spain. Cream-colored leather seats, which can be rotated 360 °, although the seat is fixed to the floor, but can still move forward and back. The seat will automatically move back to its original position when there are no more occupants at the end of each session. The second floor was installed 339 Sensó model seats for the press and attendees. All seats are fitted with modern communication equipment.

The building has more than 700 sets of wooden doors, partitions using aluminum frames, soundproof glass walls, plasterwork and wood cladding. All stone walling works were made abroad and are hung on bearing racks. In addition, about 8,000 sets of tables, chairs, furniture were produced and installed for work rooms and meeting rooms. The toilet system uses domestic ceramic equipment manufactured by Viglacera.

The lighting system of this project has about 21,000 interior lighting sets with incident lighting and escape directions, and lighting control systems. The working environment is designed to be light and ensures a reasonable view, taking interior light down from the roof and from the recesses. Nowhere in the National Assembly House is directly exposed to sunlight, even in the West, thanks to the combination of the sunshade system, the design of solid aluminum trim (outside the aluminum and glass frame) and Automatic vertical system. The building has two sets of very large crystal chandeliers: one hanging from the ceiling of the Diên Hồng room weighs about 6 tons, the other in the Great Hall weighs about 4.5 tons, both fully built from Italy.

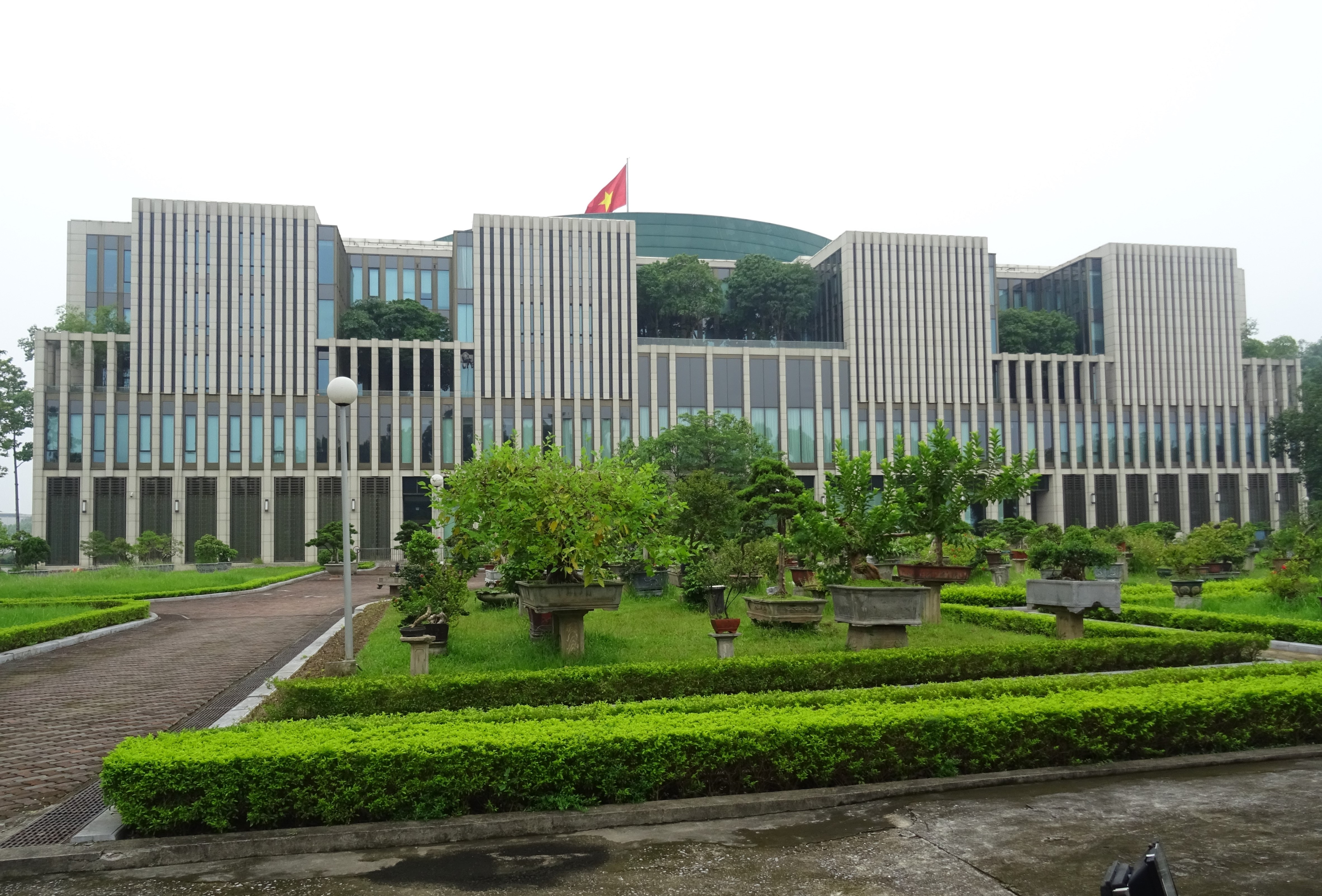
Exterior decoration with outdoor bonsai and roof gardens

=== Exterior ===
The building facade materials are bright beige natural stone, copper-colored glass and metal, as well as wood materials. The glass installed outside the building is in harmony with the landscape but still ensures that from the outside (when the interior lighting is turned on) does not reveal the details.

A copy of the emblem of Vietnam hangs in the middle of the building's facade, made of pure copper, weighing 2.5 tons domestically. The lobby outside the building and Bắc Sơn Square are paved with hundreds of thousands of tons of anti-slip granite mined in Bình Định. The high-rise outdoor area of the building has 14 hanging gardens interspersed with offices, forming patches on the cube, planted with palm trees, bamboo, and sesame buds.

View of the building's facade with decorations promoting the 2026 Vietnamese legislative election.

=== Systems engineering ===
The building integrates equipment such as generators, lighting systems, fire protection systems, self systems automated façade, safety door system.

Audio, video and television equipment systems from VNPT and VTC have been installed. Electronic and sound systems are connected to the switching matrix system with terminals to ensure harmonious integration with interior architecture, high redundancy and stable operation. This system can accommodate 80 independent meetings, conferences with over 2500 delegates at the same time in the building.

The water supply system serving the building is equivalent to a water plant, and the power and control system is the same size as a factory, all located in the basement. There are over one thousand kilometers of electrical cable used in the building. The cable line connecting the LAN in the building is also 360 km long.

The building has 128 sets of CCTV; access, access and door control systems (servers, workstations, monitors, control cabinets and actuators).

==== Energy efficiency ====
In 2018, the National Assembly House was awarded the 5-star Green Energy Certificate by the People's Committee of Hanoi. The National Assembly building uses the intelligent building management system BMS (Building Management System) to control and operate the air-conditioning system, lighting system, security system, fire alarm, elevator system, system exhaust fan. Glass used in the building is boxed glass with a vacuum layer in between, preventing up to 72% of UV rays passing through. The transparent wall of the building uses energy-saving glass, has sound and heat insulation. Some surround glass positions can be opened.

The entire building space uses Toshiba's VRV intelligent air-conditioning system, which features air-conditioning systems with variable solvent flow through frequency regulation. Energy efficiency is high, with the SMMS (super modular mutil system) heat pump system achieving an energy efficiency ratio (EER) of 4.1 with a power level of 14 kW and potentially reduced power consumption. consumption of the system to 50%. The solar heat pump system is also used to provide hot water for daily life with the advantage of not depending on the weather, operating at night, unlike hot water with solar energy.

== Archeological findings ==
=== 18 Hoàng Diệu ===
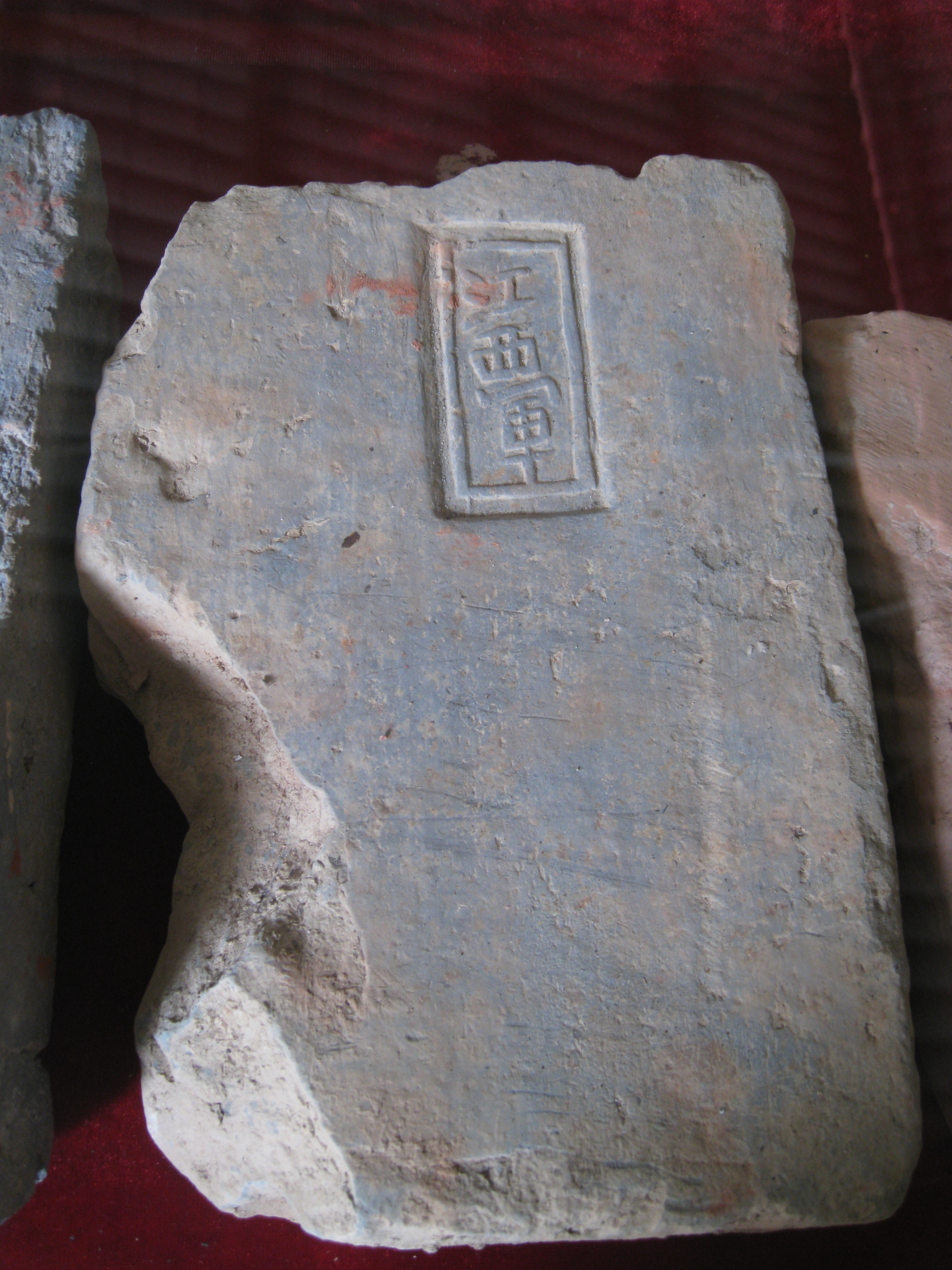
Jiangxi excavated in the ancient capital Hoa Lu (illustration)

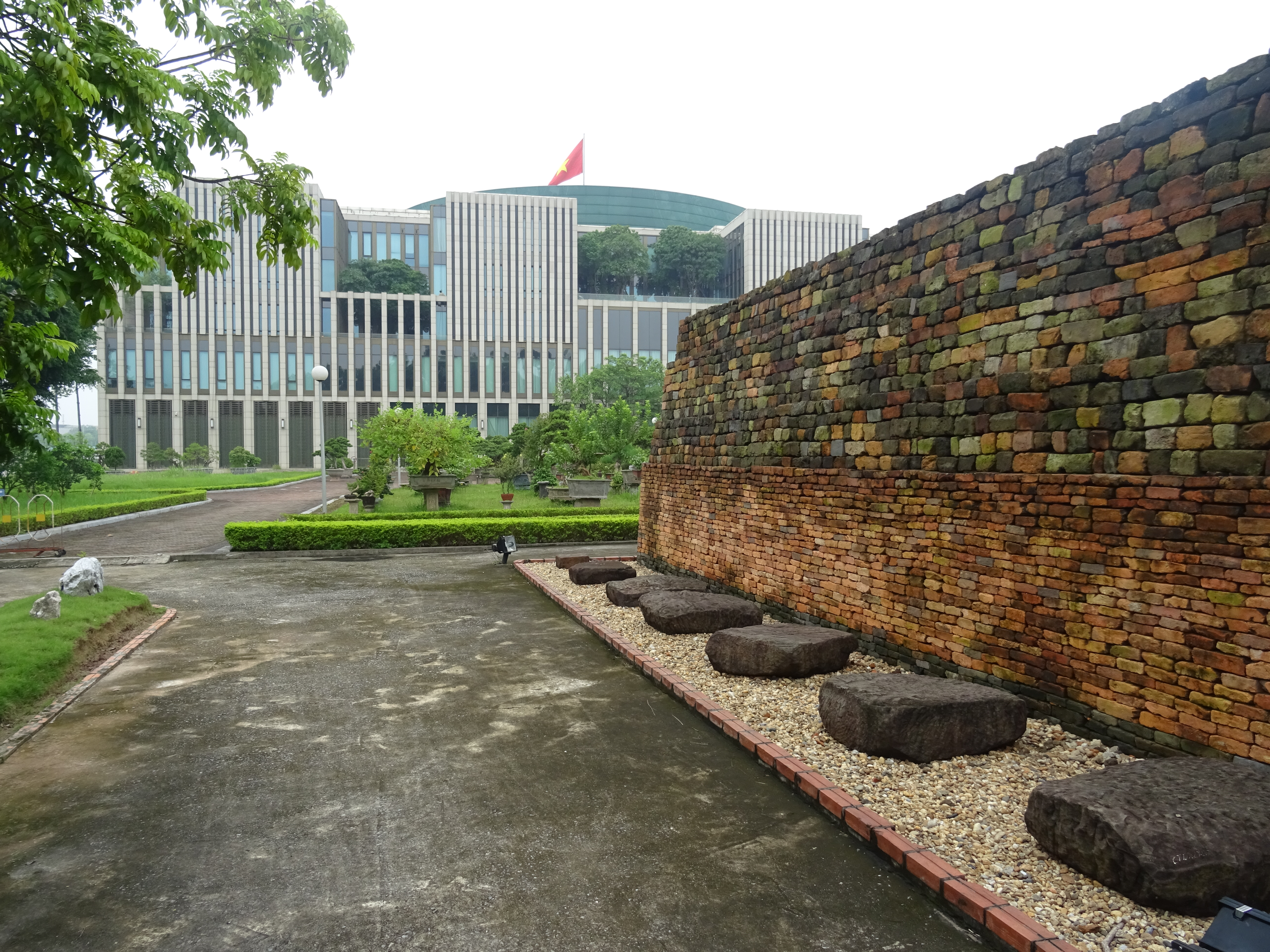
The pillar legs and the wall are assembled from ancient bricks unearthed at 18 Hoàng Diệu

In December 2002, to prepare the ground for the construction of the National Housei, Vietnam Institute of Archaeology conducted an archaeological excavation at 18 Hoang Dieu, which was the residence of the officer (Vietnam People's Army). Due to pressure from the construction of the National Assembly, archaeologists determined only the initial excavated area was 2000m² out of the total 48,000m² of the site, the excavated area area from 50m² to 100m² wide. However, after several months of excavation, tens of thousands of artifacts of bricks, tiles, wood, pottery, and porcelain have been revealed. They are ancient architecture from the Le, Tran, and Ly dynasties, and even traces of Dai La citadel in the Tang dynasty; This caused a big surprise to archaeologists. The vestiges of corridors, gravel pillars with pillar footstones with the distance of over 5.75m suggest extremely large-scale architectural works. The Relic Advisory Council established by the Minister of Culture and Information proposed to keep the relics and expand the excavation scope.

The archaeological excavation at 18 Hoang Dieu has become the largest archaeological excavation in Vietnam ever. Archaeological excavation site 18 Hoang Dieu is divided into 4 zones by the Archaeological Institute, named A, B, C, D.

In the excavation areas, many types of architectural relics and relics have been discovered, overlapping for 1300 years: starting from the La Dynasty (7th – 9th century), through the Dinh - Pre-Le dynasties (10th century), Ly (1009–1225), Tran (1226–1400), Ho (1400–1407), Le s (1428–1527), Mac (1527– 1592), Le Trung Hung (1592–1789) and Nguyen (1802 –1945). The bottom layer is the architectural system of the Pre-Thang Long period, also known as the period of Annam Province or Đại La, clearly shown through the system of wooden pillars, architectural foundations, drainage sewers, water wells and relics such as "Jiangxi Quan" bricks, the head of the tile is decorated with the image of a beast, a clown face and many objects. Ceramics dating from the 7th - 9th centuries. Brick with the word "Jiangxi Quan" is the earliest type of brick printed with Chinese characters discovered by archaeologists.

On the architecture class of Dai La period, there are some places with cultural traces of the Dinh - Tien Le dynasty, but with dense density still the architecture of Ly - Tran dynasty (11th – 13th centuries), clearly manifest through the Architectural ground system with gravel foundation pillars to support column footing, brick foundation layers, lotus stone foot, brick yard, drainage sewer, especially types of decorative relics named architectural roofs large and sophisticatedly decorated. The system of pillar foundations is square, arranged in horizontal rows, vertical rows with fairly standard distance, large size and the position of each pillar foundation is the position of a wooden column. Typically, traces of the palace architecture of a giant scale such as 13-room architecture (revealed 9 rooms) in the north of zone A or 13-room architecture in the middle of zone B, architecture of 9 rooms holes D4 – D5. The distance between the female pillars is very large, about 6m, indicating that the buildings are very large, possibly at least 67m long. Many structures have porch columns buried deep underground, to reinforce the sustainability of the project. Column burial technique and anti-settlement reinforcement are the characteristics reflecting the high construction level and very standard of the Ly period.

At the top is the architectural layer of the Le dynasty (15th - 18th century) with traces of the architectural foundations built of mallet brick, a system of wells, especially the serpentine tiles, the dragon-decorated glaciers. 5 specialized nails for roofing on the roof of the king's palace and various kinds of porcelain used exclusively for the king. Some locations have cultural vestiges of the Nguyen Dynasty (nineteenth - twentieth centuries) but are not clear.

Archaeologists have found unique monuments and artifacts associated with the state monarch of Vietnam and royal life but still controversial about name as well as function: altar, piece of wood engraved with the word "Fate Chi Bao"...

In the world, there are very few capitals of countries where the ground still preserves a collection of relics bearing a long history and overlapping cultural layers. This is a prominent feature of the 18 Hoang Dieu archaeological site. In 2010, the Central Citadel of Thang Long - Hanoi, including the central axis and archaeological site of 18 Hoang Dieu, was enrolled in the UNESCO World Heritage List.

In 2015, the management board of the investment project to build the National Assembly House and Ba Dinh Hall (new) handed over the archaeological site of 18 Hoang Dieu to the Thang Long Heritage Conservation Center - Hanoi. construction of technical infrastructure works and landscape of archaeological area 18 Hoang Dieu. All archaeological relics in this area have been preserved with sand, kept archaeological remains in the ground and prepared for visitors' service.

=== Archaeological discoveries under the National Assembly House ===
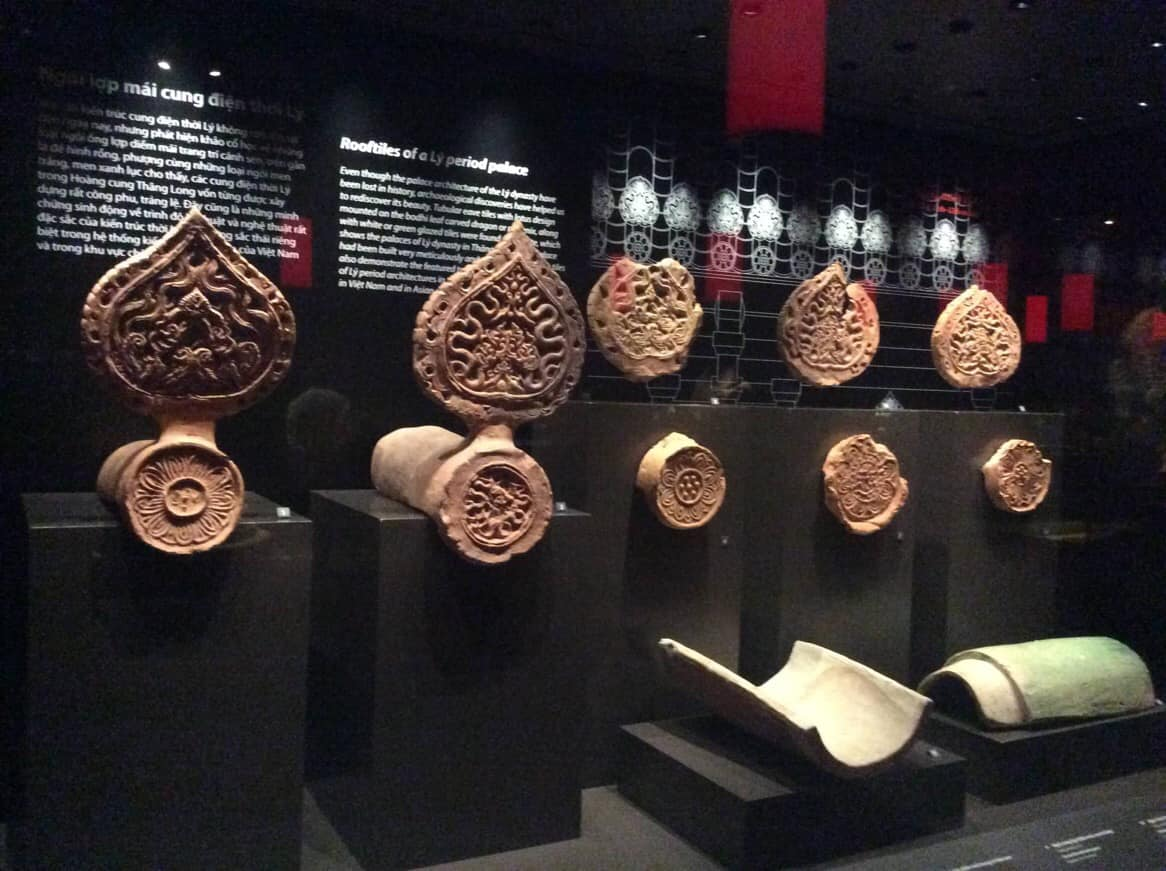
The roof tiles of the Lý dynasty palace are displayed in the basement of the National Assembly's House

The project of displaying relics and relics in the basement of the National Assembly House was officially started at the end of 2011 and completed, opened in May 2016. The Prime Minister assigned Vietnam Academy of Social Sciences, directly, the Citadel Research Center (transformed into the Imperial City Research Institute in 2017) organizes the project implementation. The exhibition area is considered the first archaeological museum in Vietnam.

The exhibition area is 7 to 13 m deep, with a total area of about 3,700 m^{2} with more than 400 relics and nearly 10 relics, selected among tens of thousands of relics and 140 monuments from the foundation of the National Assembly House was discovered by archaeologists during excavations in the area during 2008–2009. The display is located in 2 basements, shown in slices of archaeological strata, the deeper it is, the older it is. The lower floor, close to the ground, is the place to introduce the relics and artifacts of the pre-Thang Long period, that is the artifacts dating from the 7th to the 10th century. living in the imperial palace of Thang Long capital from the Ly, Tran, and Le dynasties from the 11th to the 18th centuries.

Here used the methods of displaying the most modern, most advanced museums with the latest techniques. For example, exhibiting artifacts in a glass cabinet combined with artifacts or negative artifacts on the floor that viewers can walk on a glass floor with large space, creating the feeling of walking on real excavation holes, along with large artifacts placed right on the floor, no glass case. The use of light (LED) in the display was very lively. The exhibition was introduced to the construction technique of "sound column" for viewers and demonstrated the architectural plan through a system of 42 light pillars simulating 42 wooden columns of an architectural Ly palace. The show begins by shining light on the pillar foundation system, highlighting the patterns on the base legs, showing the shape of the platform, then showing the sprouting vermilion poles. Such a light cycle takes about 5 minutes. In addition, 3D movies are shown on black walls to create effects such as animations of Truc Lam a painting, 3D movies show birds jumping in cages combined with the sound of birds singing. (illustration of the food canister for birds in the Palace) ...

Displaying in the basement of the National Assembly has reached international standards that few museums in Vietnam do. Modern interactive devices such as 48 and 90 inch touch screens with large interactive floors provide space for information extraction and for children to freely interact, participate in games that combine archeology. However, the exhibition area has not yet had a specific plan for people to see widely, currently only experts, work-related departments at the National Assembly House such as: National Assembly deputies, International delegations or guests traveling in groups with pre-registration at the Office of the National Assembly or the Citadel Research Institute can visit.

== Contemporary art exhibition ==
In 2018, President of the National Assembly Nguyễn Thị Kim Ngân decided to implement a contemporary art space, with 15 artists creating an exhibition modeled around "dialogue with cultural and artistic heritage". More than 500m in length of the three sections of the National Assembly's tunnel (small tunnel, large tunnel and garage tunnel) are covered with large-sized installion art. The works with a variety of materials have completely transformed the passageway of the National Assembly into a space for contemporary art. This contemporary art space was voted by the Ministry of Culture, Sports and Tourism Ministry of Culture, Sports and Tourism as one of the top 10 cultural, sports and tourism events of Vietnam in 2018.

The project's art curator is visual artist Nguyen The Son. 15 artists (Le Dang Ninh, Nguyen Oanh Phi Phi, Nguyen Khac Quang, Nguyen The Son, Nguyen Xuan Lam, Pham Khac Quang, Phan Hai Bang, Tran Cong Dung, Tran Hau Yen The, Trieu Khac Tien, Trieu Minh Hai, Trinh Minh Tien, Vu Kim Thu, Vu Xuan Dong, Vuong Van Thao) together with more than 100 technical assistants and skilled craftsmen in 10 workshops scattered throughout Hanoi, Thai Binh and Hue have worked continuously. in 3 months to get 35 completely new works. The project includes works ranging from open graphics to multimedia installations, silk video art, relief photography, interactive bronze carving installations, motion soldering installations. This contemporary art space connects to the two basement spaces of the Archaeological Museum of Thang Long and Tien Thang Long, creating a connecting interaction from ancient to contemporary spaces, giving viewers a special experience.

This is the first space in Vietnam to have a diverse art collection of different types and materials designed specifically for specialized spaces, which can be considered an important contemporary art museum in Vietnam.

== See also ==
- Vietnam National Convention Center
- Imperial Citadel of Thăng Long
