= Vietnam Academy of Social Sciences =

Vietnamese governmental department

Vietnam Academy of Social Sciences (VASS) Viện Hàn lâm Khoa học xã hội Việt Nam
- Abbreviation: VASS
- Formation: 2 December 1953; 72 years ago
- Headquarters: VASS
- Location: 1 Lieu Giai str., Ba Đình district, Hanoi, Vietnam
- Official language: Vietnamese
- Chairman: Phan Chí Hiếu
- Website: vass.gov.vn

Vietnam Academy of Social Sciences (VASS) is a department of the Vietnamese government responsible for studying key social science issues in the Socialist Republic of Vietnam.

== Leaders ==
- Trần Huy Liệu: 1953–1959
- Nguyễn Khánh Toàn: 1967–1982
- Đào Văn Tập: 1982–1985
- Phạm Như Cương: 1985–1990
- Đặng Xuân Kỳ: 1990–1991
- Nguyễn Duy Quý: 1991–1993, 1993–2003
- Đỗ Hoài Nam: 2003–2008, 2008–2011
- Nguyễn Xuân Thắng: 2011–2013, 2013–2016
- Nguyễn Quang Thuấn: 2016–2019
- Bùi Nhật Quang: 2019–2022
- Đặng Xuân Thanh: 2022–2023
- Phan Chí Hiếu: 2023–present

== Structure ==
1. Institute of Anthropology
2. Institute of Family and Gender Studies
3. Institute of Archaeology
4. Institute for Royal Citadel Studies – Viện NC Kinh thành
5. Southern Institute of Sustainable Development
6. Institute for Sustainable Development of the Central Region (Viện Khoa học xã hội vùng Trung Bộ)
7. Institute for Sustainable Development of the Central Highland- Viện Khoa học xã hội vùng Tây Nguyên
8. Institute of World Economics and Politics
9. Vietnam Institute of Economics
10. Institute of State and Law
11. Institute for Human Studies
12. Institute of European Studides
13. Institute of African and Middle East Studies
14. Vietnam Institute of American Studies
15. Viện Nghiên cứu Đông Bắc Á
16. Institute for Southeast Asian Studies
17. Institute of Indian and Southwest Asian Studies
18. Institute of Hán-Nôm Studies (Viện nghiên cứu Hán Nôm)
19. Institute of Environment and Sustainable Development
20. Institute for Religious Studies
21. Institute for Chinese Studies
22. Institute of Culture Studies
23. Institute of Linguistics
24. Institute of History
25. Institute of Psychology
26. Institute of Social Sciences Information
27. Institute of Philosophy
28. Viện Từ điển học và Bách khoa thư Việt Nam
29. Institute of Literature
30. Institute of Sociology
31. Centre for Analysis and Forecasting
32. Vietnam Museum of Ethnology
33. Vietnam Social Science Review
34. Social Sciences Publishing House
35. Encyclopedia Publishing House
36. Graduate Academy of Social Sciences
37. Centre for Sustainable Development Policy Studies
