= Vietnam Institute of Archaeology =

Vietnamese archaeological institute

Coordinates: 21°01′06″N 105°51′18″E

The Vietnam Institute of Archaeology (Vietnamese: Viện khảo cổ học) is an important archaeological institution in Vietnam. It is based in Hanoi. The institute has been responsible for the coordination of many notable archaeological finds in the country.
