= Hanoi =

Capital and centrally-governed city of Vietnam

- Capital Centrally-governed city
- Hà Nội City; Thành phố Hà Nội
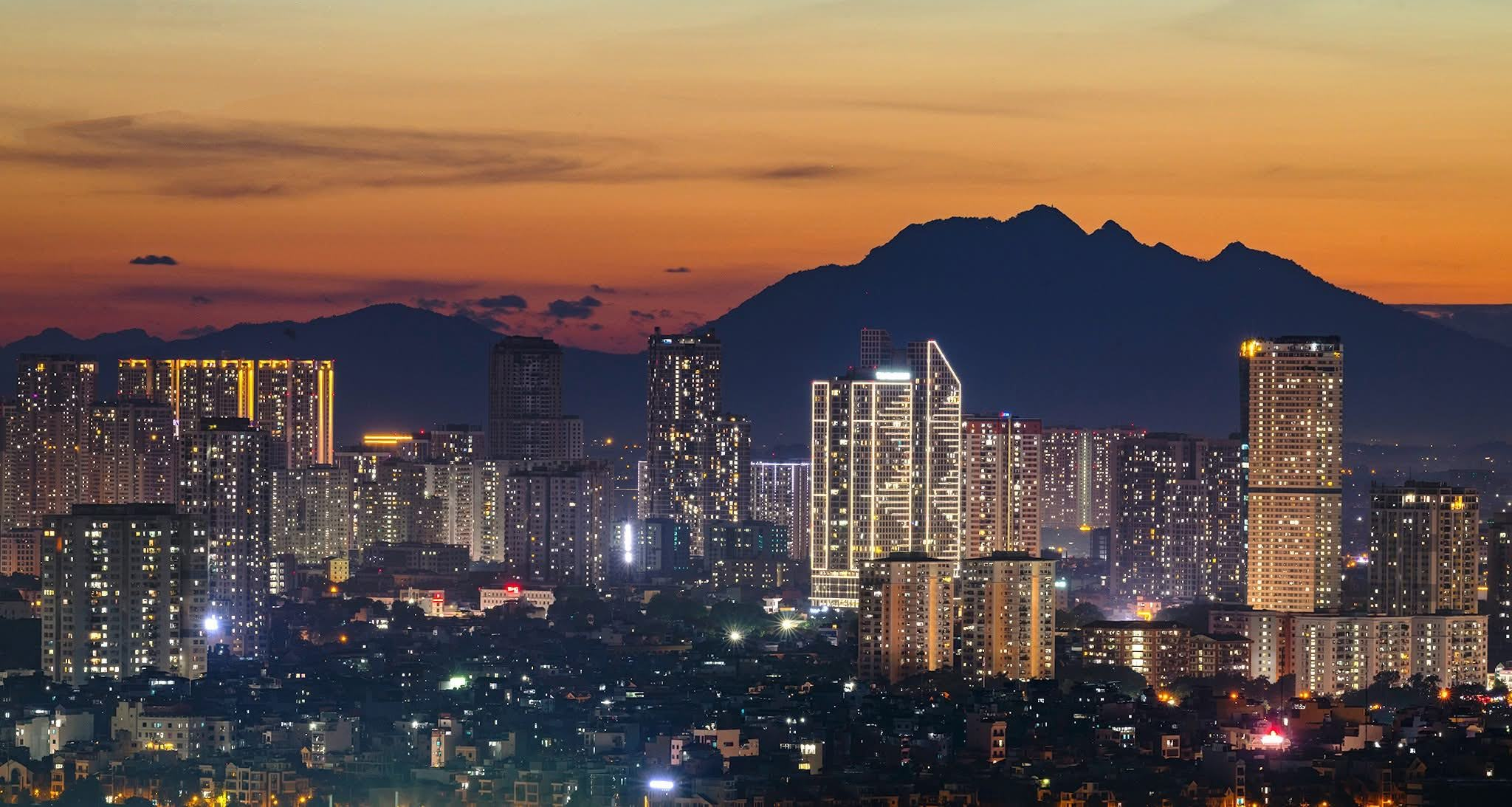
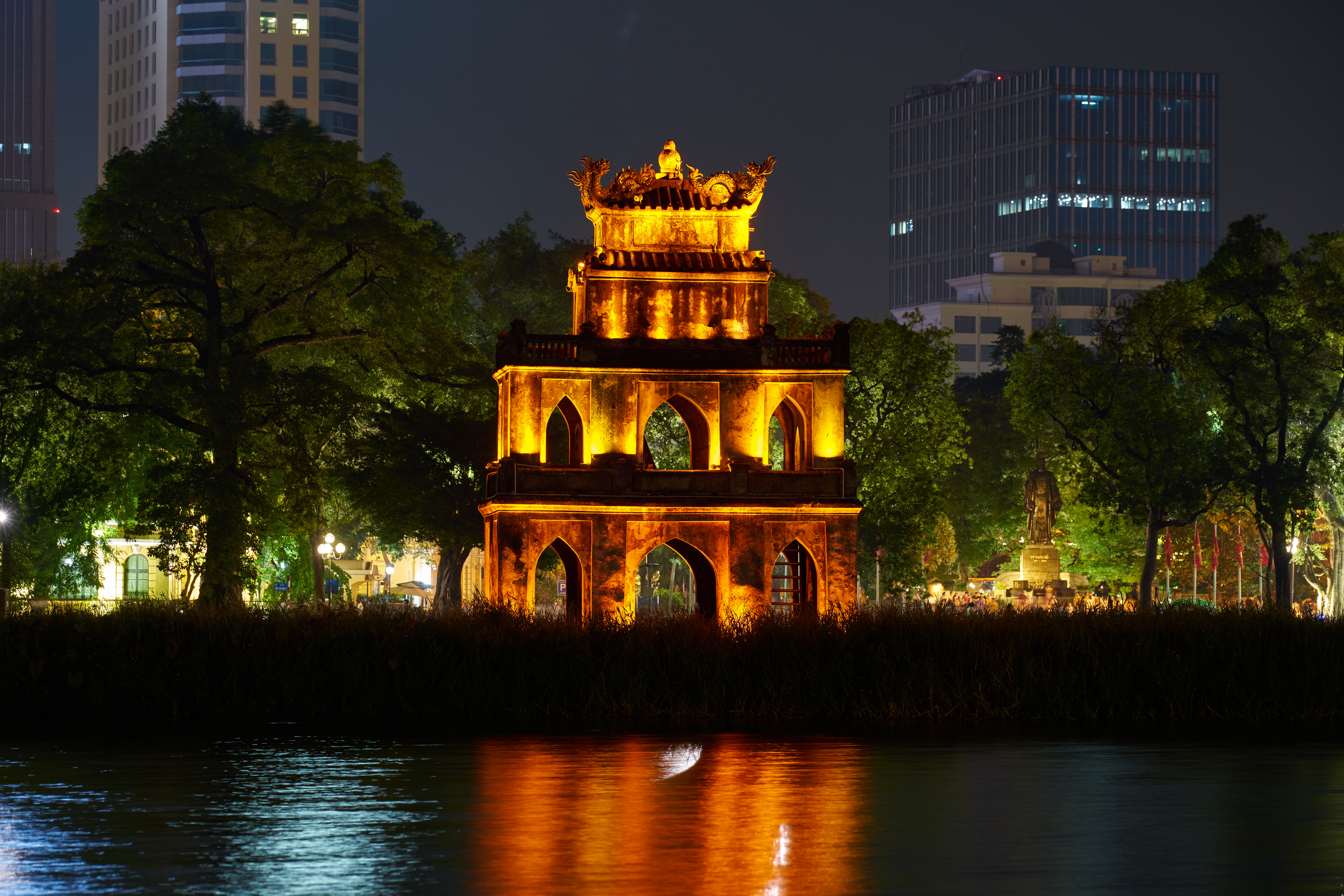
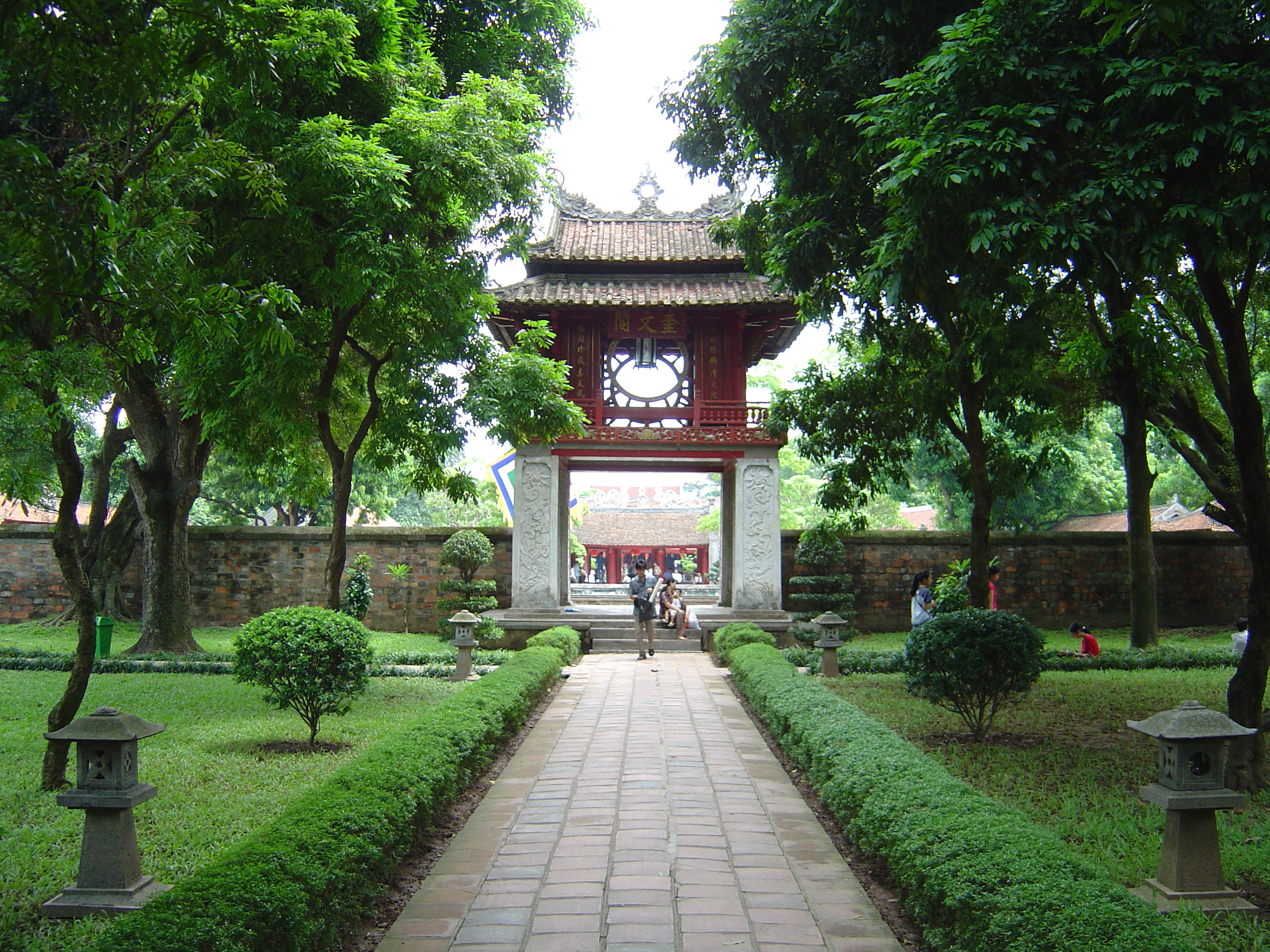
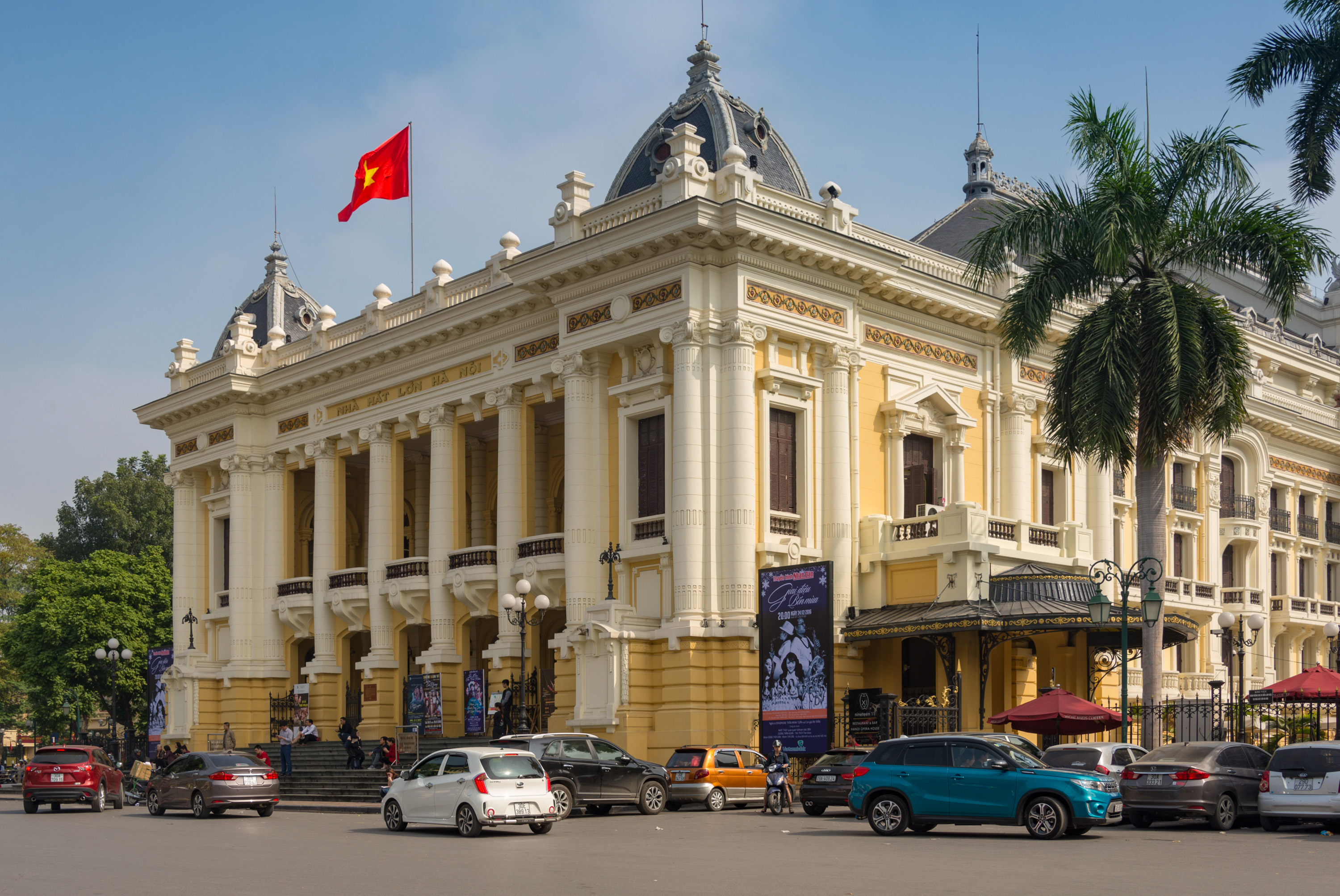
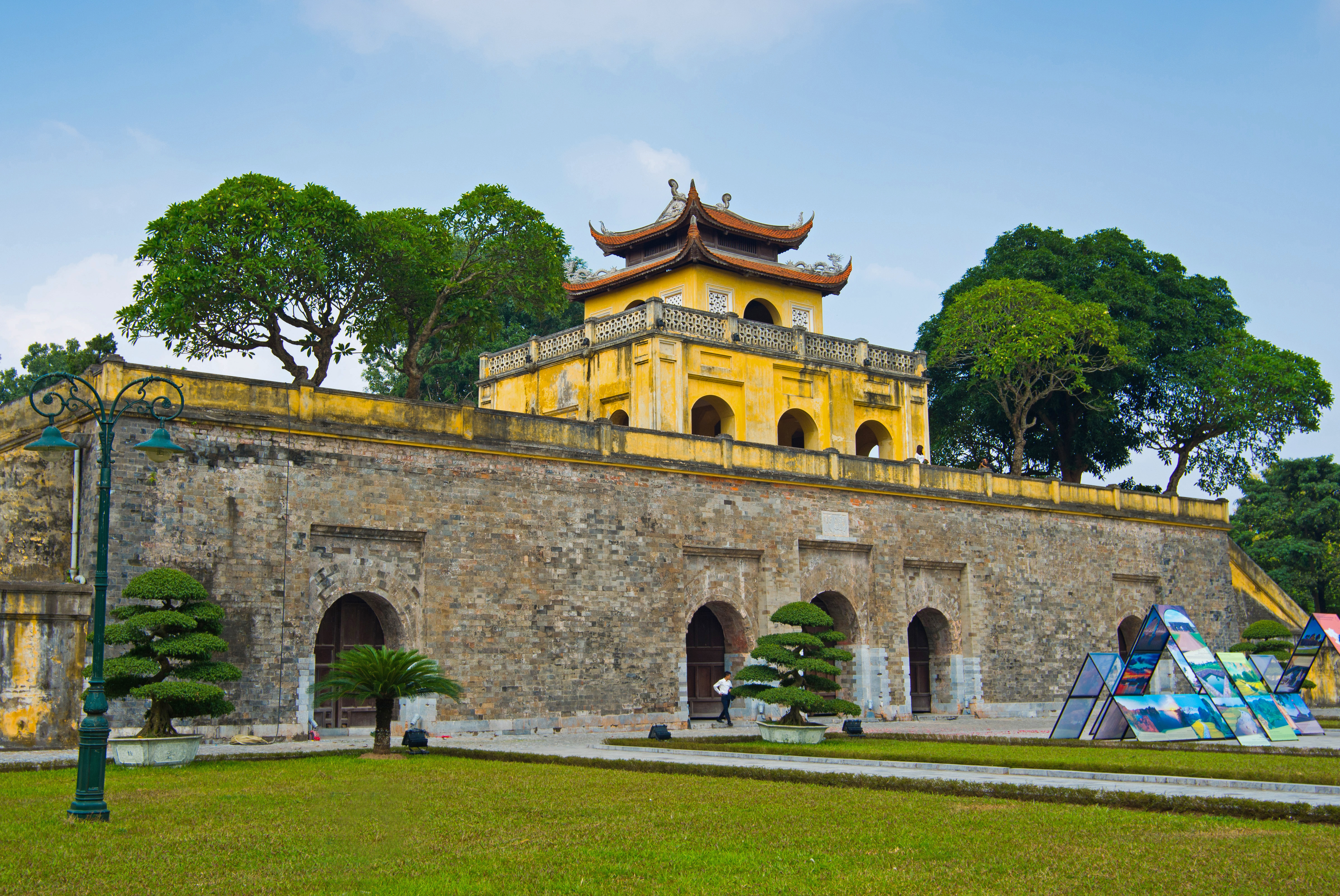
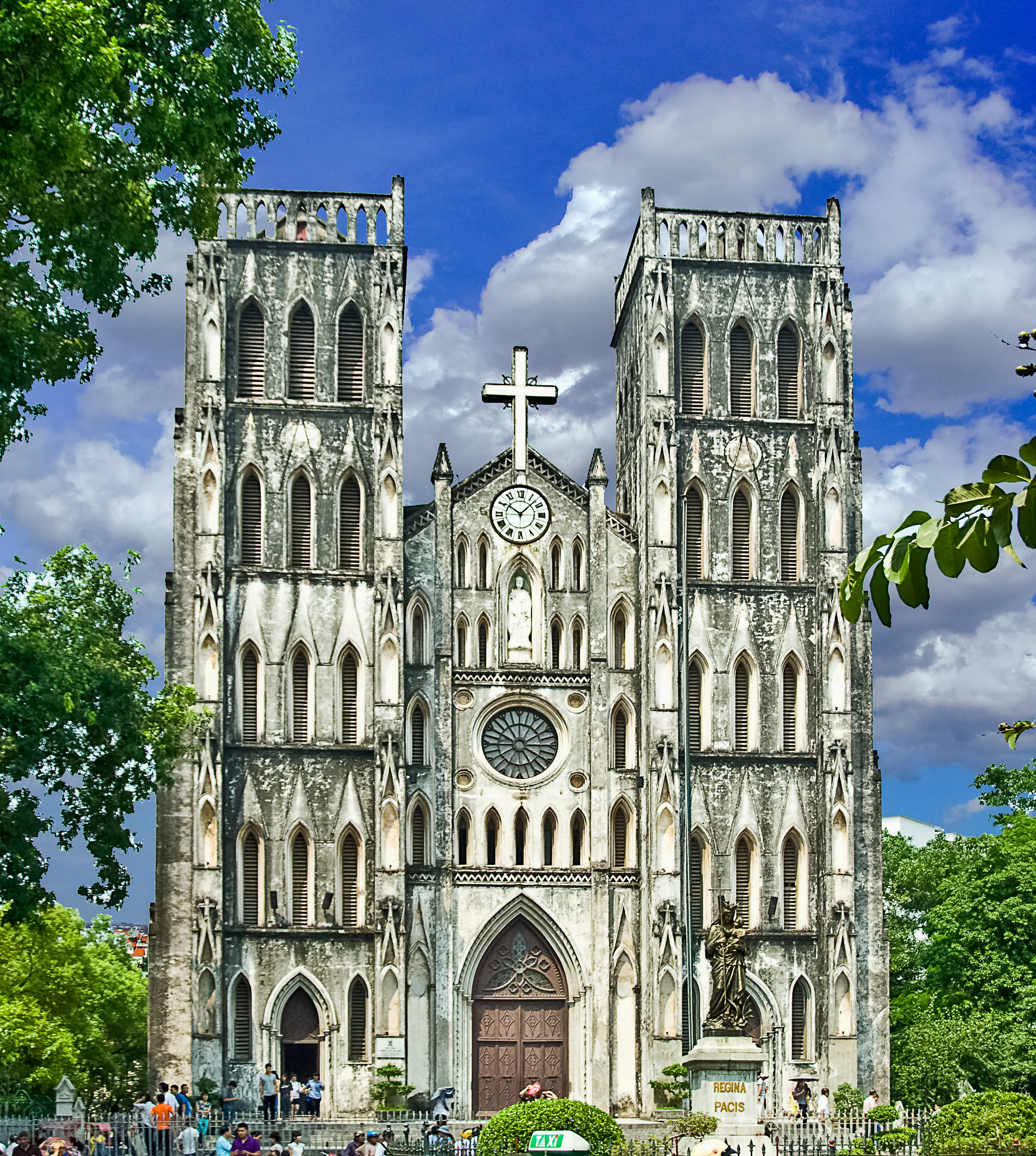
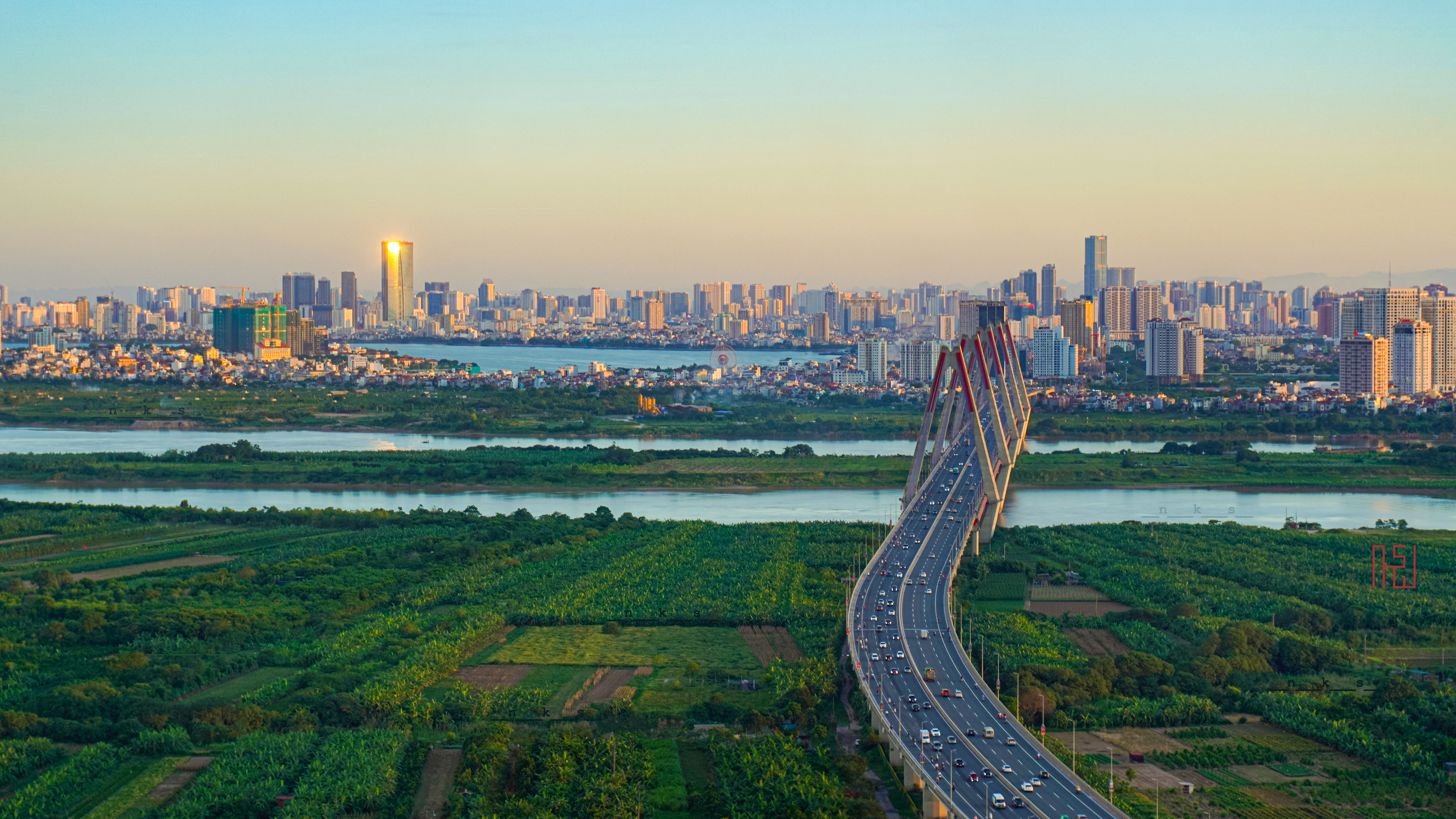
- Hanoi skyline at night with Ba Vì mountain range Turtle Tower Temple of Literature Hanoi Opera House Imperial Citadel Ho Chi Minh Mausoleum St. Joseph's Cathedral Hanoi skyline with Nhật Tân Bridge

- Seal
- Nicknames: City of soaring dragon (Thành phố rồng bay); Thousand-year-long capital of civilisation (Thủ đô nghìn năm văn hiến)
- Interactive map of Hanoi
- Location in Vietnam Location in Asia
- Coordinates: 21.00°N 105.85°E
- Country: Vietnam
- Region: Red River Delta
- Capital establishment: 1010
- French occupation: 20 November 1873
- Colonial liberation: 10 October 1954
- Subdivisions (list): 51 wards; 75 communes

Government
  - Body: Hanoi People's Council
  - Secretary of the Party Committee: Nguyễn Duy Ngọc
  - Chairwoman of People's Council: Phùng Thị Hồng Hà
  - Chairman of People's Committee: Vũ Đại Thắng
  - Chairman of Fatherland Front: Bùi Huyền Mai

Area
  - Total: 3,359.84 km^{2} (1,297.24 sq mi)
  - Urban: 319.56 km^{2} (123.38 sq mi)
  - Metro: 24,314.7 km^{2} (9,388.0 sq mi)
- Highest elevation: 1,296 m (4,252 ft)
- Lowest elevation: 0 m (0 ft)

Population (2025)
  - Total: 8,855,946
  - Rank: 2nd
  - Density: 2,635.82/km^{2} (6,826.75/sq mi)
  - Metro: 19,795,805
- Demonym: Hanoian

Ethnic groups
  - Viet (Note: Also called Kinh people): 98.66%
  - Mường: 0.77%
  - Tày: 0.24%
  - Thái: 0.09%
  - Nùng: 0.08%
  - Others: 0.16%

GDP (Nominal, 2023)
  - Metro: US$97.2 billion
  - Per capita: US$4,900
- Time zone: UTC+07:00 (ICT)
- Postal code: 10xxx–14xxx
- Area codes: 24
- ISO 3166 code: VN-HN
- License plate: 29–33, 40
- HDI (2023): ▲0.845 (1st)
- Website: hanoi.gov.vn

Hanoi (/hæˈnɔɪ/ ha-NOY; Vietnamese: Hà Nội, pronounced [haː˨˩ noj˧˨ʔ]) is the capital and second-most populous centrally-governed city of Vietnam. It covers an area of 3,358.6 km^{2} (1,296.8 mi^{2}), and as of 2026 has a population of 8.7 million. Hanoi had the second-highest gross regional domestic product of all Vietnamese provinces and centrally-governed cities at US$48 billion in 2023, behind Ho Chi Minh City. It hosts 83 foreign embassies, the headquarters of the Vietnam People's Army (VPA), its Vietnam National University system, and other governmental organizations. Hanoi had 18.7 million domestic and international visitors in 2022. It hosts the Imperial Citadel of Thăng Long, Ho Chi Minh Mausoleum, Hoàn Kiếm Lake, West Lake, and Ba Vì National Park near the outskirts of the municipality. Hanoi's urban area has architectural styles, including pre-colonial Vietnamese architecture, French colonial architecture, brutalist apartments and disorganized alleys and tube houses stemming from the city's growth in the 20th century.

In 1010, under the Lý dynasty, emperor Lý Thái Tổ established the capital of the imperial nation Đại Việt in what would later become central Hanoi, naming the city Thăng Long ([tʰɐŋ loŋ], 'ascending dragon'). In 1428, king Lê Lợi renamed the city to Đông Kinh ([ɗoŋ kīŋ̟], 'eastern capital'), with the city using this name until 1789. In 1802, the Nguyễn dynasty moved the national capital to Huế and the city was renamed Hanoi in 1831. Hanoi served as the capital of French Indochina from 1902 to 1945 and of the French protectorate of Tonkin from 1883 to 1949. After the August Revolution and the fall of the Nguyễn dynasty, the Democratic Republic of Vietnam (DRV) designated Hanoi as the capital of the newly independent country. From 1949 to 1954, Hanoi was part of the State of Vietnam. It was again part of the DRV from 1954 to 1976. In 1976, Hanoi became the capital of the unified Socialist Republic of Vietnam.

== Names ==
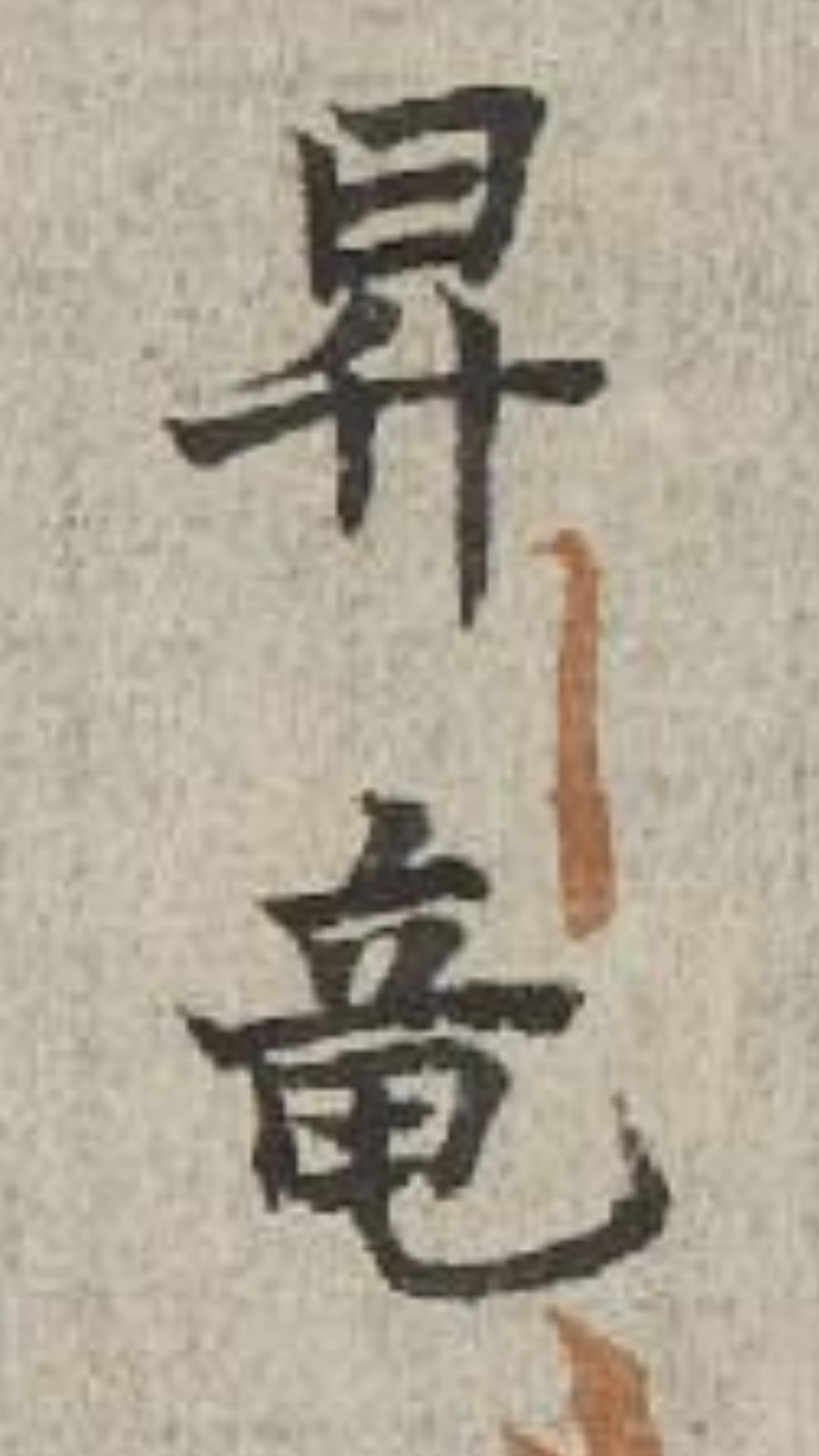
Thăng Long (昇竜)

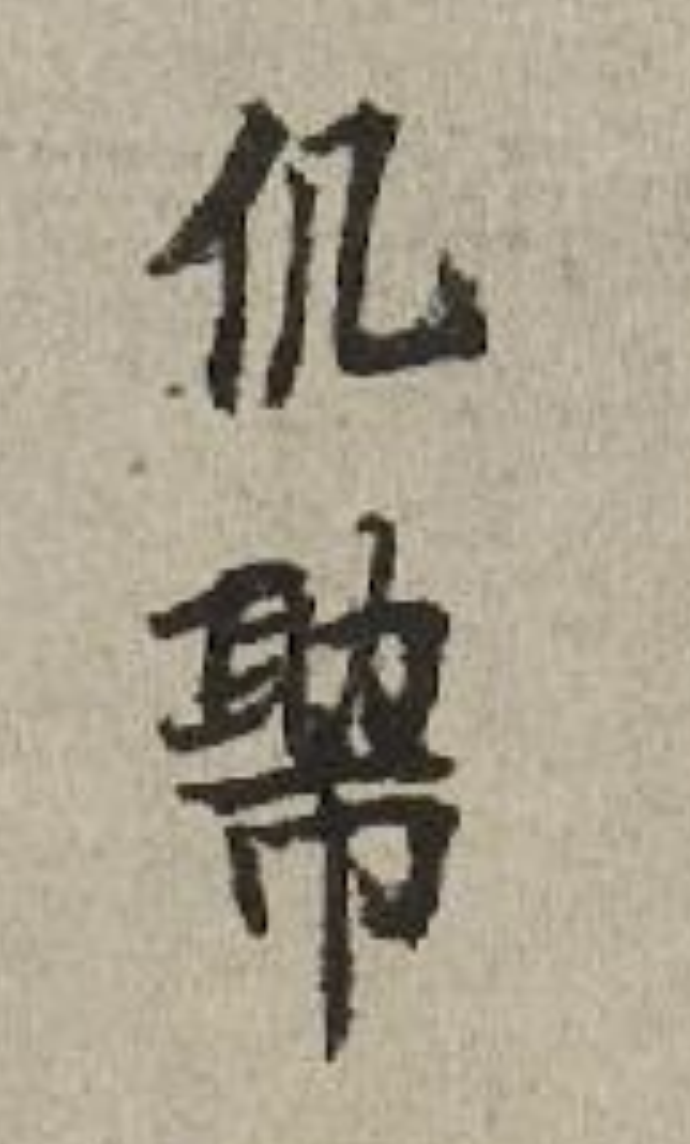
Kẻ Chợ (仉𢄂)

Excerpts from Đại Nam quốc sử diễn ca

Hanoi was first referred to as Long Biên (龍編, p Lóngbiān, lit. 'dragons interweaving'), then Tống Bình (宋平, p Sòngpíng, lit. 'Song pacification') and Long Đỗ (龍肚, lit. 'dragon belly') sometime in 450. Long Biên later gave its name to the Long Biên Bridge, built during French colonial times. By the time of the Tang dynasty, both were used to refer to the city in official and colloquial discourse. Some older names of Hanoi feature long (龍, transl. dragon), linked to the curved formation of the Red River around the city, which was symbolized as a dragon.

In 866, the city was recaptured by Tang General Gao Pian, who renamed it Đại La (大羅, lit. 'big net'). This gave it the nickname La Thành (羅城, p Dàluó, lit. 'La citadel'). When Lý Thái Tổ established the capital in the area in 1010, it was named Thăng Long (昇龍).

Medieval Muslim sources between the 9th and 12th century referred to Hanoi as Luqin (لوكين), a term derived from Longbian (Middle Chinese: Ljowng-pen), and was originally used by Muslim traders to mention the Vietnamese.

== History ==
=== Prehistory ===
Vestiges of human habitation from the Palaeolithic and Mesolithic ages can be found in Hanoi. Between 1971 and 1972, archaeologists in Ba Vì and Đông Anh discovered pebbles with traces of carving and processing by human hands that are relics of Sơn Vi Culture, dating from 10,000 to 20,000 years ago. In 1998–1999, the Museum of Vietnamese History (later is National Museum of Vietnamese History) carried out the archaeological studies in the north of Đồng Mô Lake (Sơn Tây, Hanoi), finding relics and objects belonging to the Sơn Vi culture dating back to the Paleolithic age around 20,000 years ago. During the Holocene transgression, the sea level rose and immersed low-lying areas; geological data show the coastline was inundated and was located near Hanoi. Consequently, from about 10,000 to approximately 4,000 years ago, Hanoi in general was completely underwater. It is believed that the region has been continuously inhabited for the last 4,000 years.

=== Cổ Loa and Nanyue ===
In around third century BC, a fortified citadel, later named as Cổ Loa, is constructed in what later is Hanoi, and is the first political center of the Vietnamese civilization pre-Sinitic era, with an outer embankment covering 600 hectares. In 179 BC, the area was annexed by Nanyue. Zhao Tuo subsequently incorporated the regions into his Nanyue domain, and left the indigenous chiefs in control of the population. For the first time, the region formed part of a polity headed by a Chinese ruler.

=== Chinese rule ===
In 111 BC, the Han dynasty conquered Nanyue and ruled it. Han dynasty organized Nanyue into seven commanderies of the south (Lingnan) and included three in Vietnam alone: Giao Chỉ and Cửu Chân, and a newly established Nhật Nam.

In March of 40 AD, Trưng Trắc and Trưng Nhị, daughters of an aristocratic family of Lac ethnicity in Mê Linh district (Hanoi), led the locals to rise up in rebellion against the Han. It began at the Red River Delta, and spread south and north from Jiaozhi, stirring up all three Lạc Việt regions and most of Lingnan, gaining the support of about 65 towns and settlements. Trưng sisters then established their court upriver in Mê Linh. In 42 AD, the Han emperor commissioned general Ma Yuan to suppress the uprising with 32,000 men, including 20,000 regulars and 12,000 regional auxiliaries. The rebellion was defeated in the next year as Ma Yuan captured and decapitated Trưng Trắc and Trưng Nhị, then sent their heads to the Han court in Luoyang.

By the middle of the fifth century, in the center of what later was Hanoi, a fortified settlement was founded by the Chinese Liu Song dynasty as the seat of a new district called Tống Bình (Songping) within Giao Chỉ commandery. The name refers to its pacification by the dynasty. It was elevated to its own commandery at some point between AD 454 and 464. The commandery included the districts of Yihuai (義懷) and Suining (綏寧) in the south of the Red River (later is Từ Liêm and Hoài Đức districts) with a metropolis in what later was inner Hanoi.

By the year 679, the Tang dynasty changed the region's name to Annan (Chinese: 安南; Vietnamese: An Nam; lit. 'pacified south'), with Songping as its capital.

Around 767, Songping's citadel was rebuilt as La Thành (羅城, Luóchéng) by Tang governor Zhang Boyi after he defeated a Javanese raid of the city. The citadel extended from Thu Le to Quan Ngua in what later was Ba Đình district. Over time, in the first half of the ninth century, this fortification was expanded and renamed as Jincheng (Vietnamese: Kim Thành). In 863, Nanzhao and local rebels laid siege of Jincheng and overran local Tang garrisons. In 866, Chinese jiedushi Gao Pian recaptured the city and drove out the Nanzhao and rebels. He renamed the city to Daluocheng (Chinese: 大羅城; Vietnamese: Đại La Thành). He built a wall around the city measuring 6,344 meters, with some sections reaching over eight meters in height. Đại La at the time had approximately 25,000 residents, including foreign communities of Persians, Arabs, Indian, Cham, Javanese, and Nestorian Christians. In 880, the Tang army in Annam mutinied, taking the city of Đại La, and forced the military commissioner Zeng Gun to flee north, ending de facto Chinese control in Northern Vietnam. By tenth century AD, what later was Hanoi was known to the Muslim traders as Luqin.

=== Capital of Đại Việt (1010–1397, 1428–1802) ===
In 1010, Lý Thái Tổ, the first ruler of the Lý dynasty, moved the capital of Đại Việt to the site of the Đại La Citadel. Claiming to have seen a dragon ascending the Red River, he renamed the city Thăng Long (昇龍). Thăng Long remained the capital of Đại Việt until 1397, when it was moved to Thanh Hóa, then known as Tây Đô (西都), the "Western Capital". Thăng Long then became Đông Đô (東都), the "Eastern Capital".

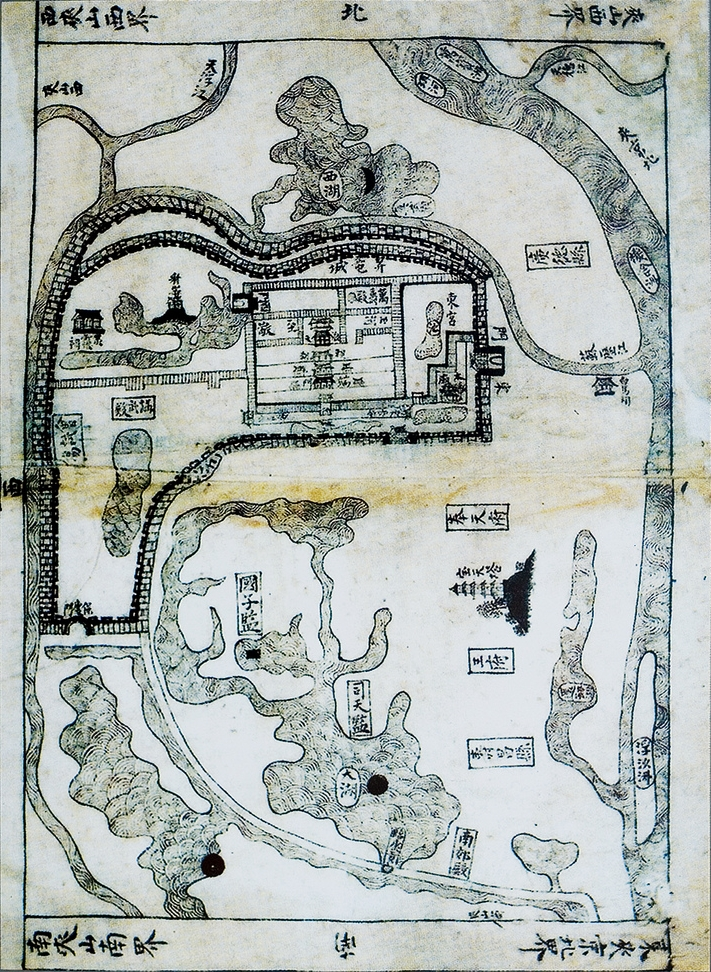
Map of Đông Kinh (Hanoi) in 1490 with Imperial Citadel of Thăng Long located in the north.

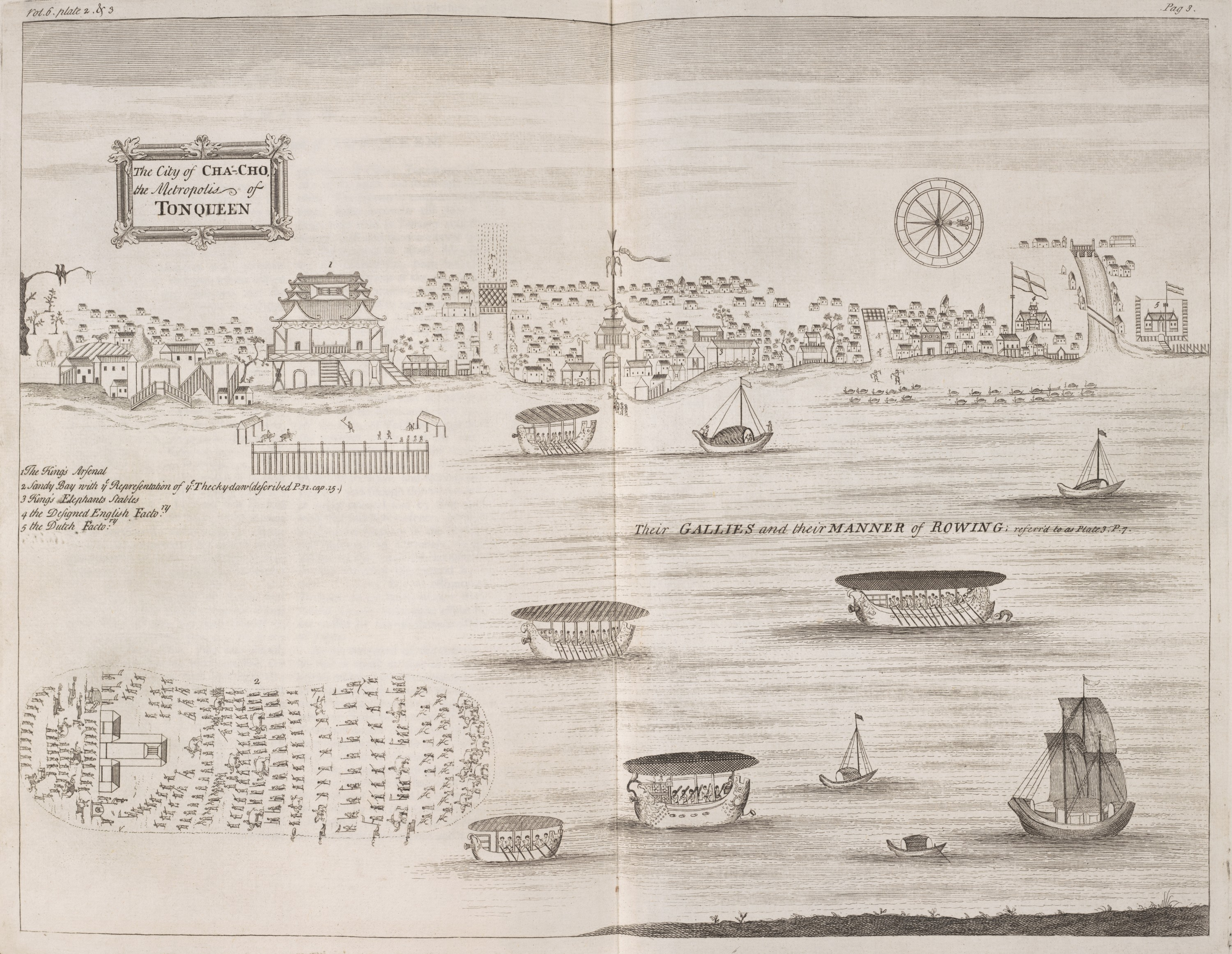
A view of Hanoi from the Red River in 1685, manuscript from Royal Society's archive.

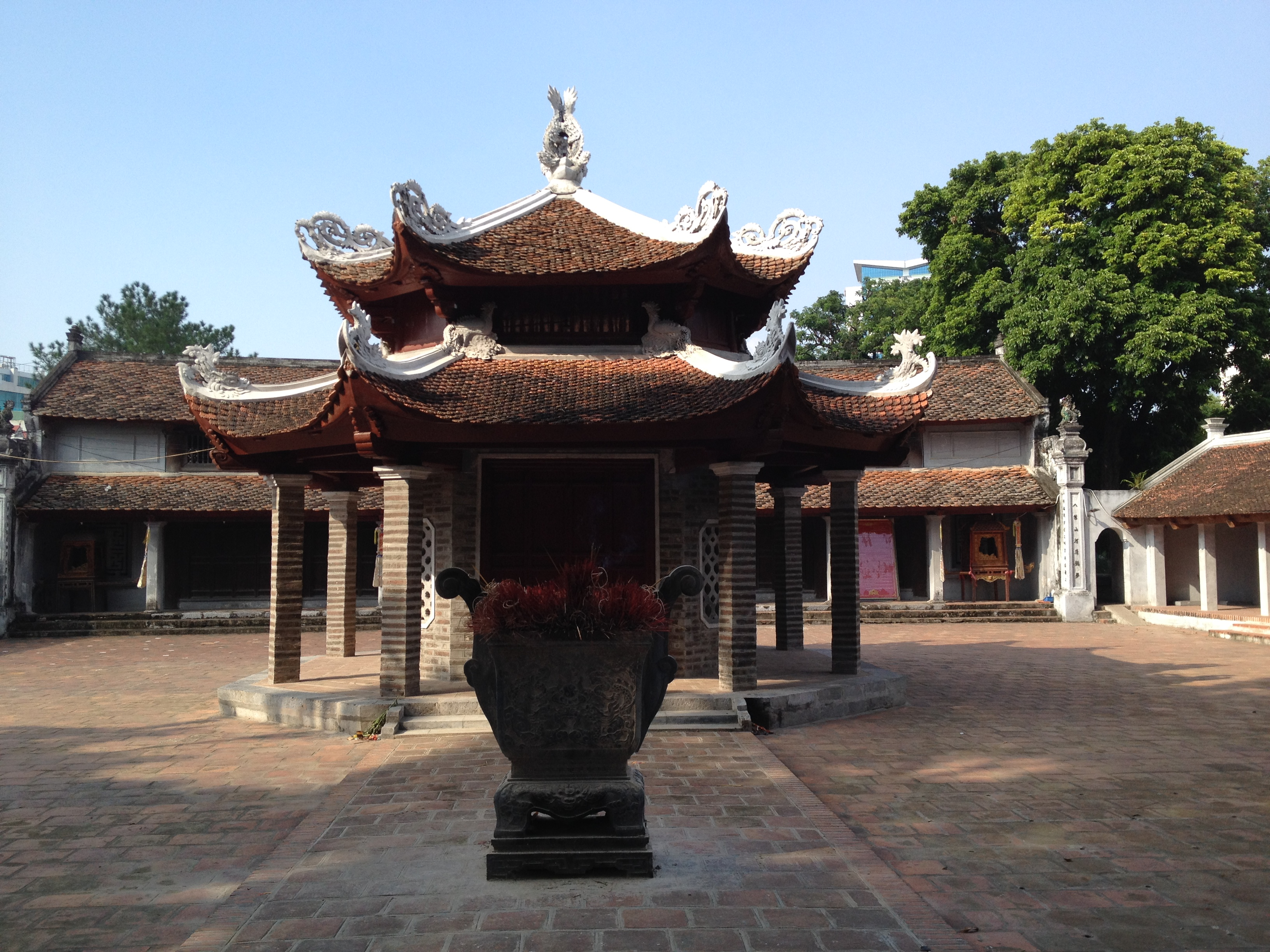
Chiêu Thiền Temple, Láng

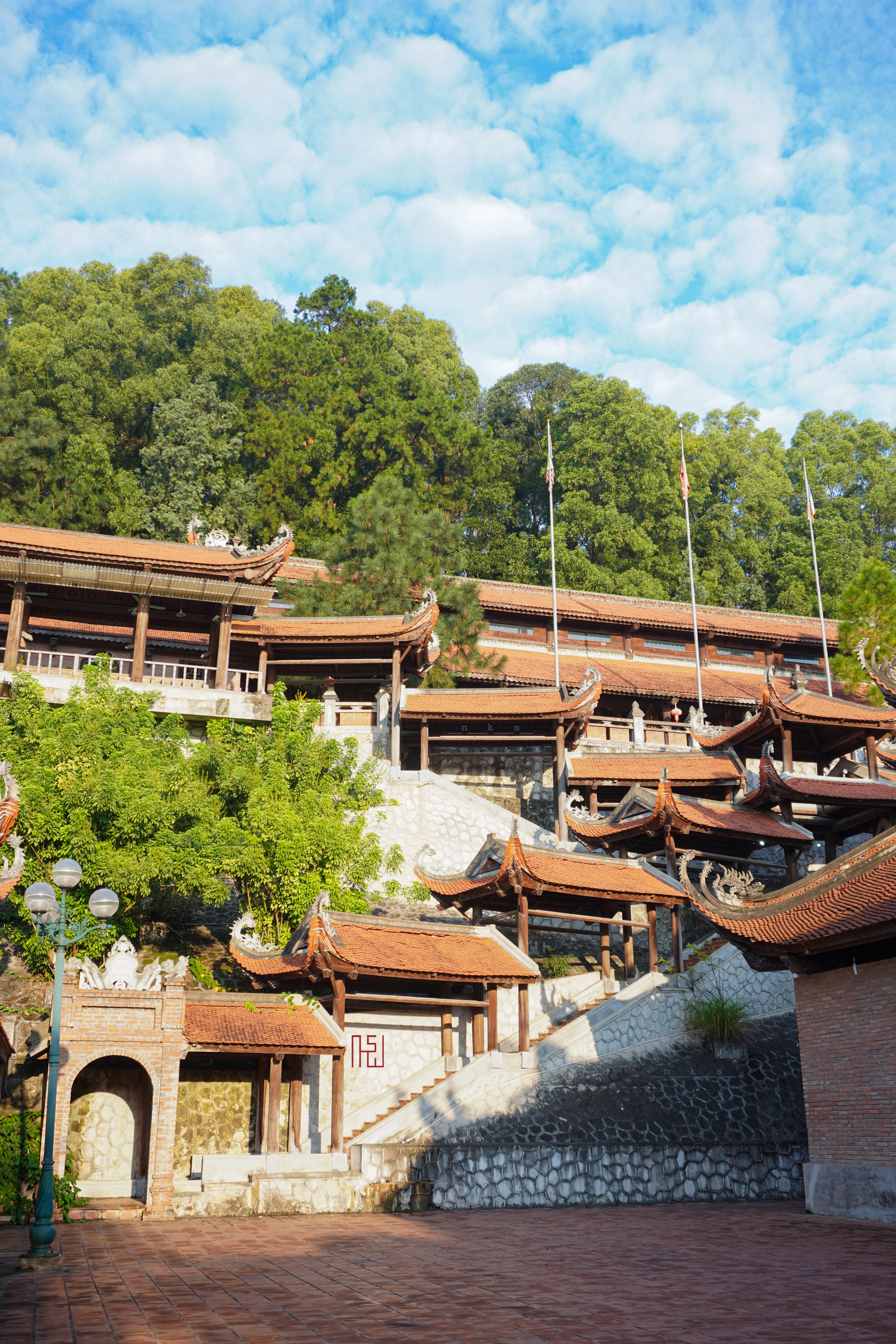
Non Nước Temple, Sóc Sơn

Quán Thánh Temple, West Lake

Confucius Temple, Văn Miếu – Quốc Tử Giám

When the Chinese Ming dynasty invaded and occupied Đại Việt in 1408, they renamed the city as Dongguan (Chinese: 東關; Vietnamese: Đông Quan; lit. 'eastern gate'). In 1428, the Lam Sơn uprising, under the leadership of Lê Lợi, overthrew the Chinese rule. Lê Lợi founded the Lê dynasty and renamed Đông Quan to Đông Kinh (東京), which was the source of Western exonym Tonkin for the whole region of Northern Vietnam. During 17th century, the population of Đông Kinh was estimated by Western diplomats as about 100,000.

=== Nguyễn dynasty and French colonial period ===
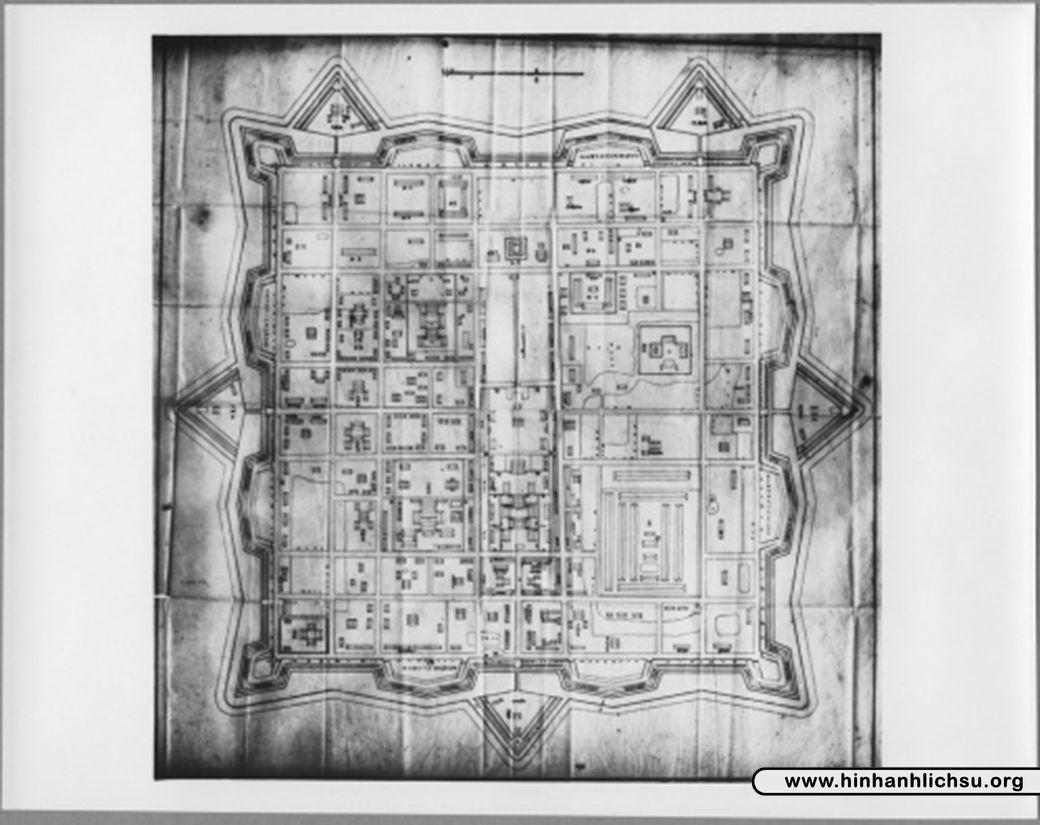
Map of Hà Nội citadel during the Nguyễn dynasty.

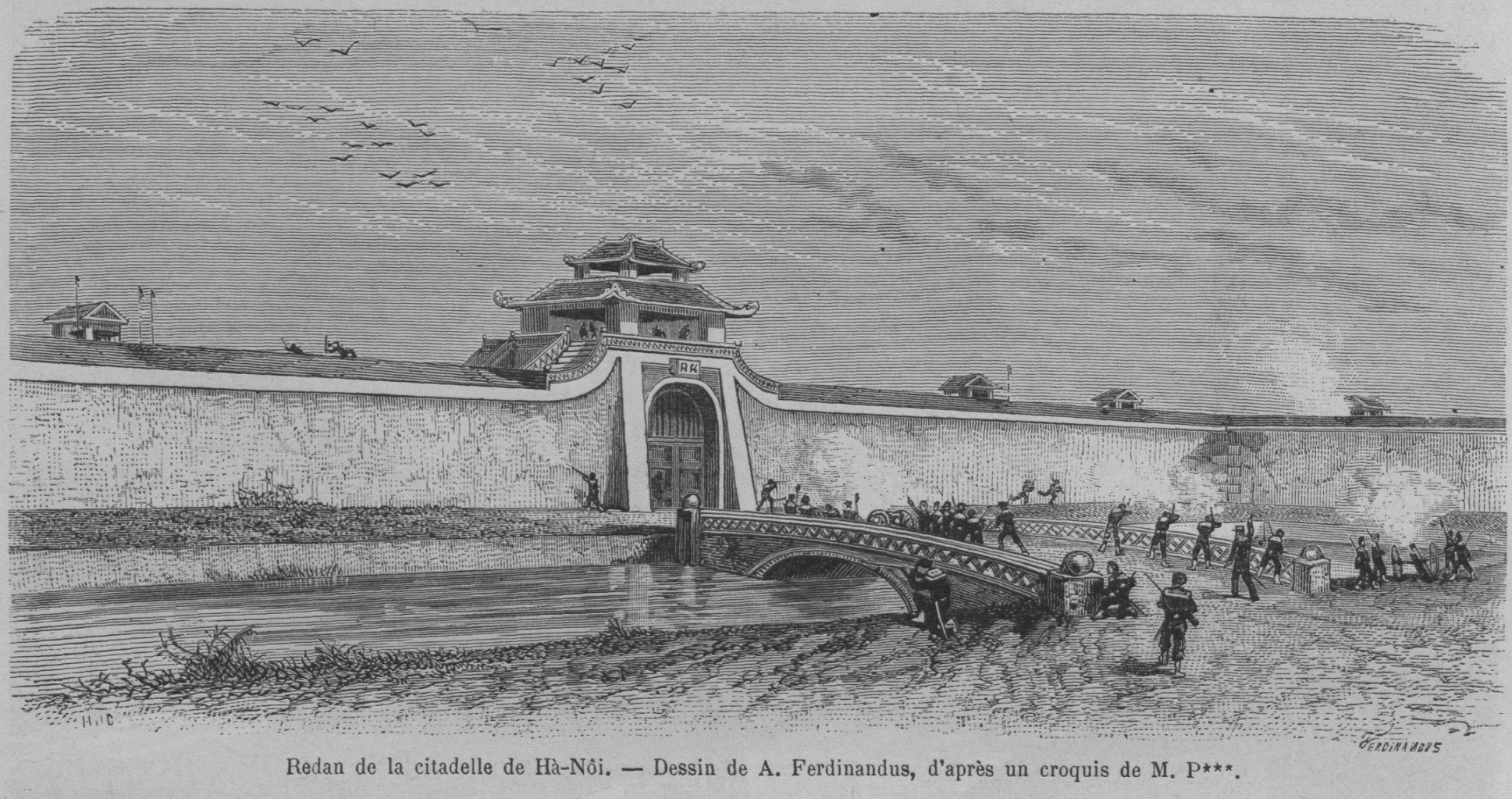
French troops attacking the city's wall on 20 November 1873.

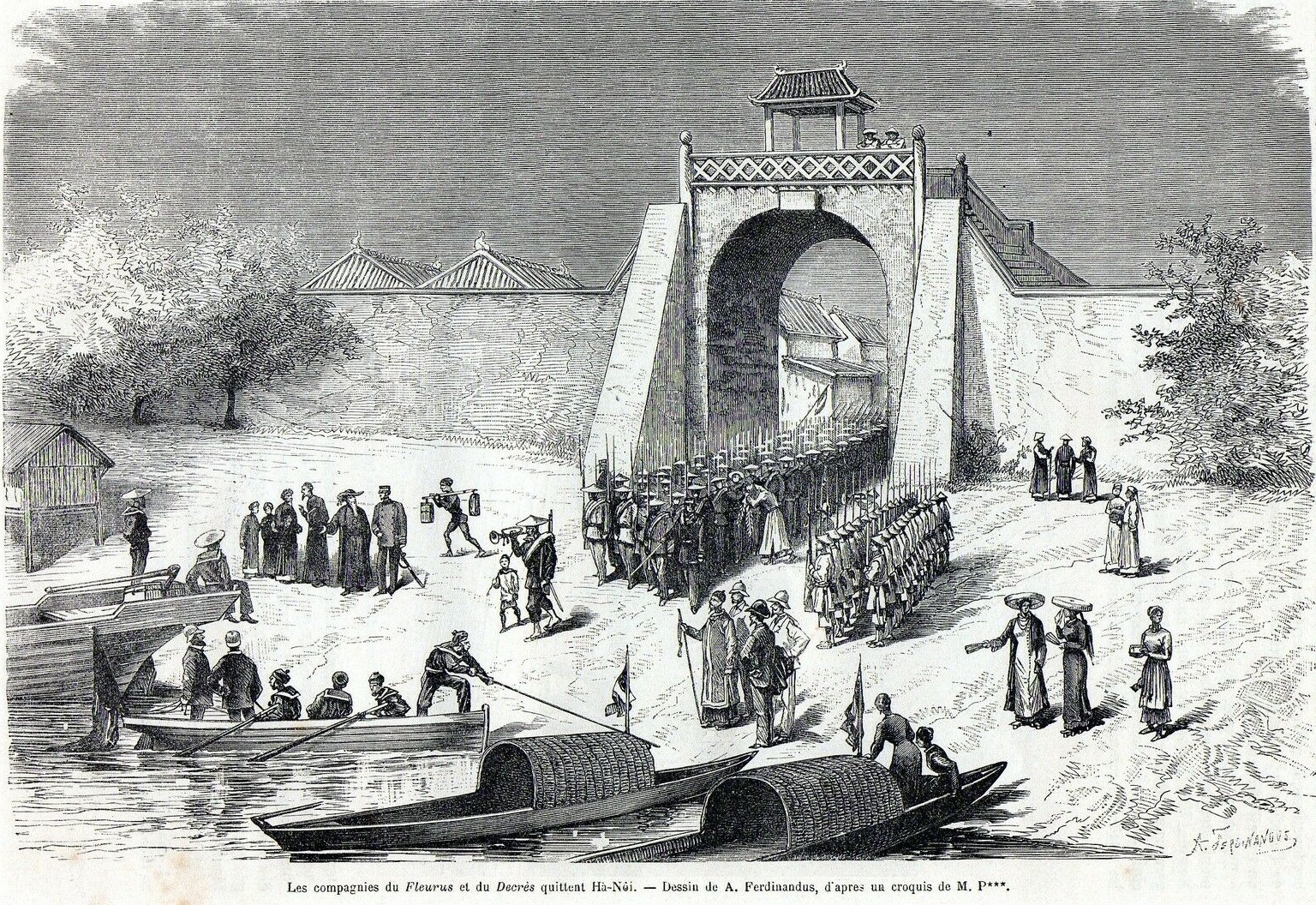
French troops leaving Hanoi in February 1874.

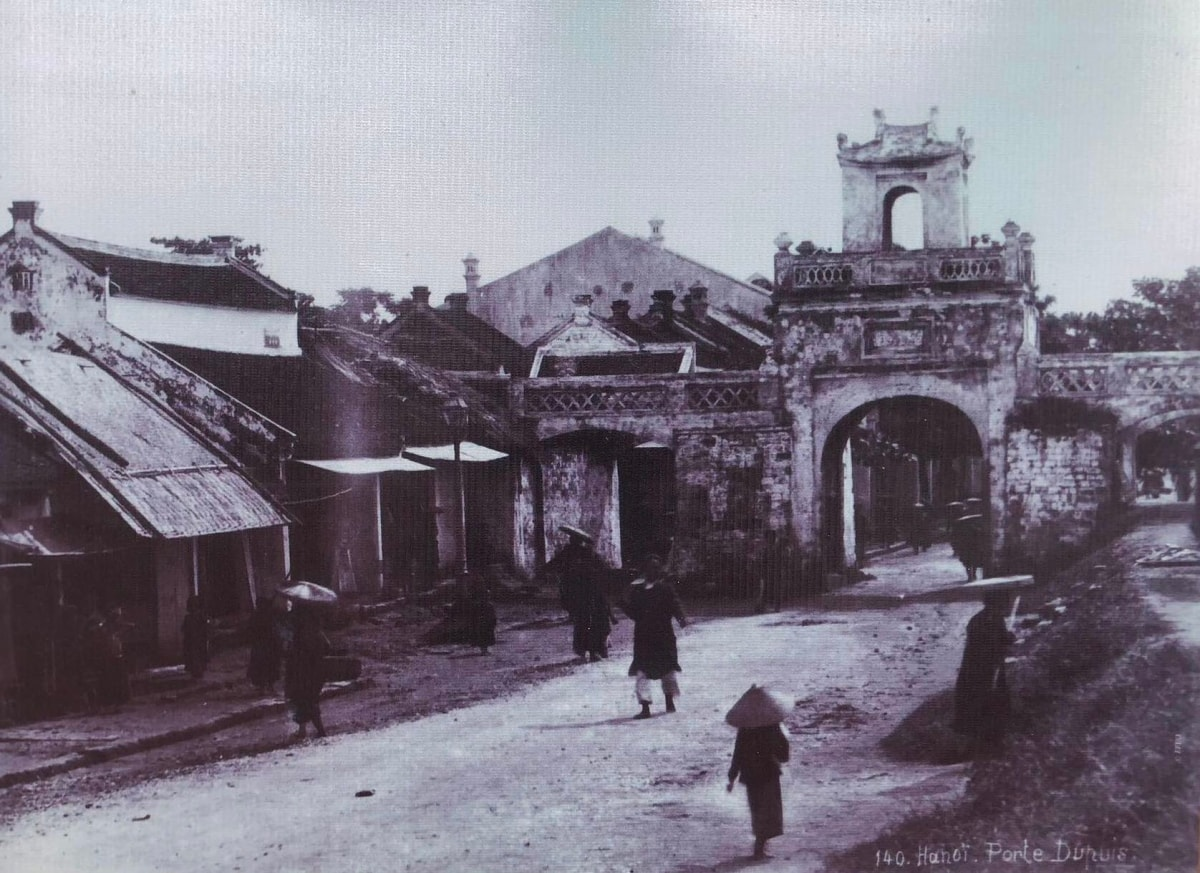
Ô Quan Chưởng or Đông Hà môn (東河門), built in 1749.

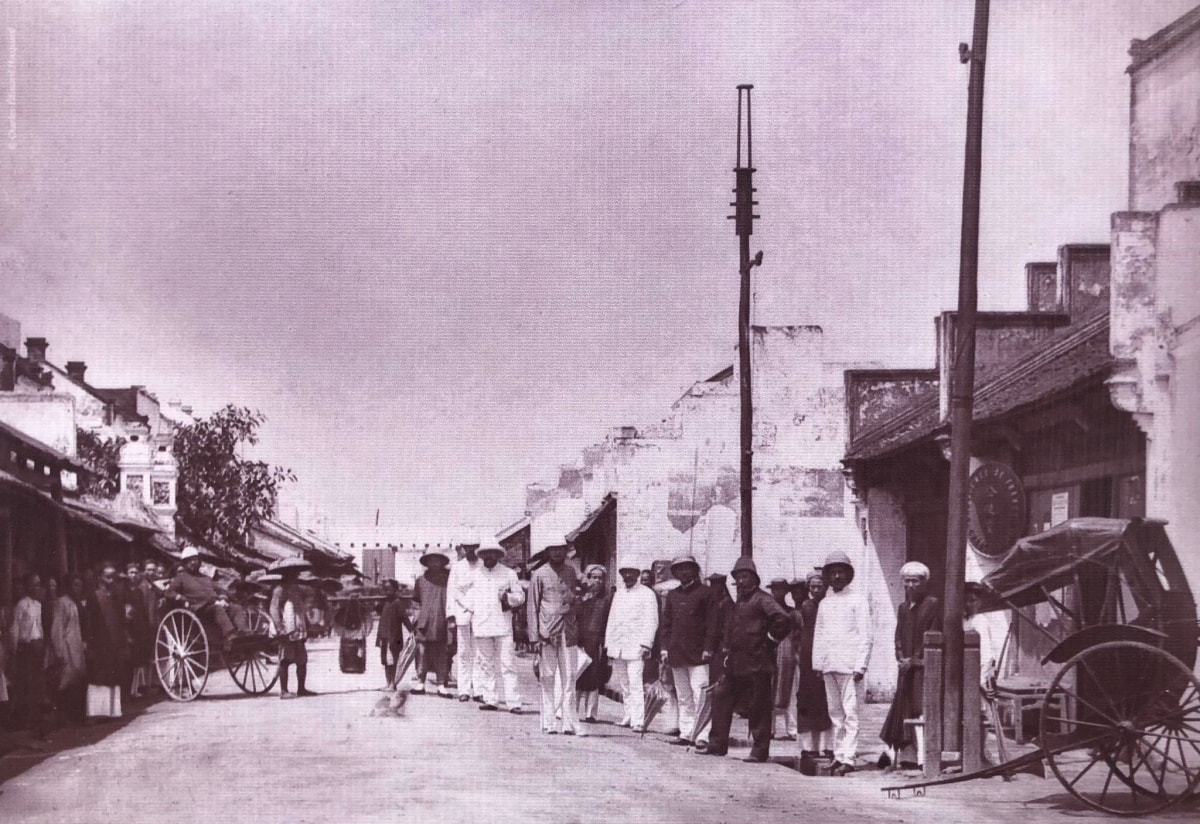
Old street of Hanoi in 1884 (Hàng Gai street).

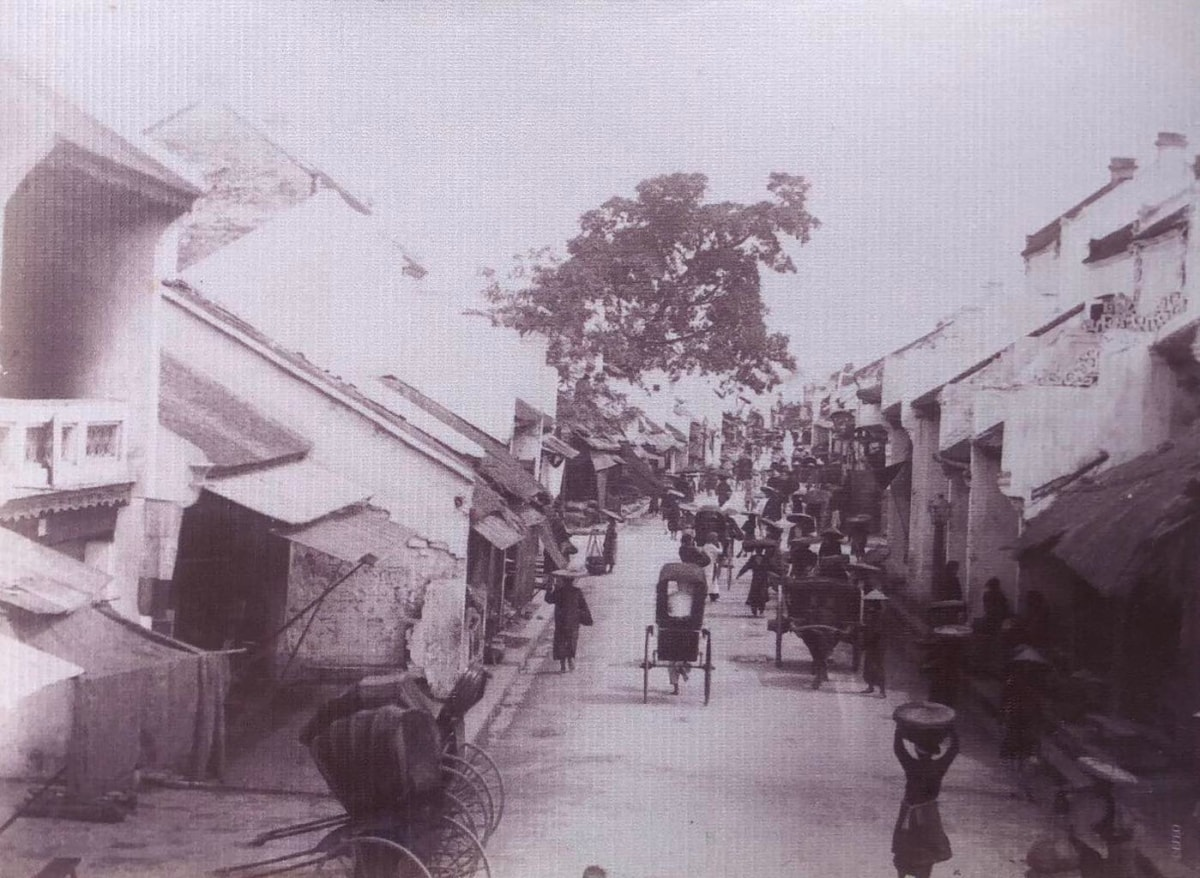
Old street of Hanoi in 1884 (Hàng Bông street).

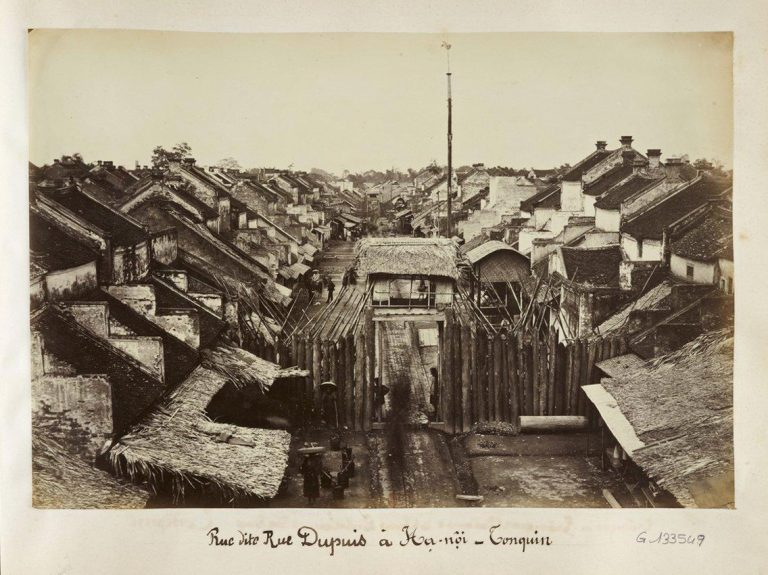
Hanoi street before French colonisation, Hàng Chiếu street in 1870s.

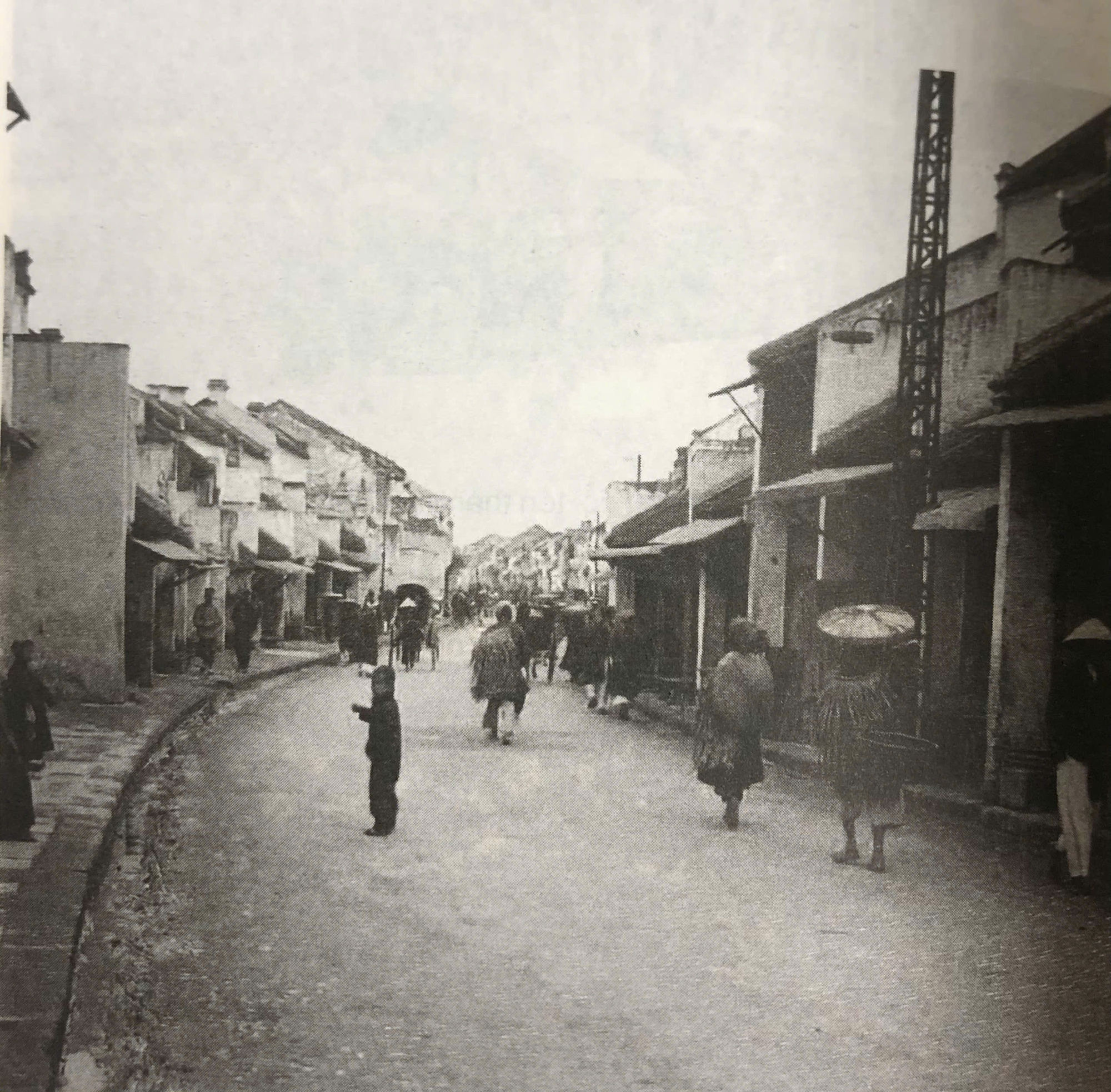
Rue du Point en Bois (later is Cầu Gỗ street).

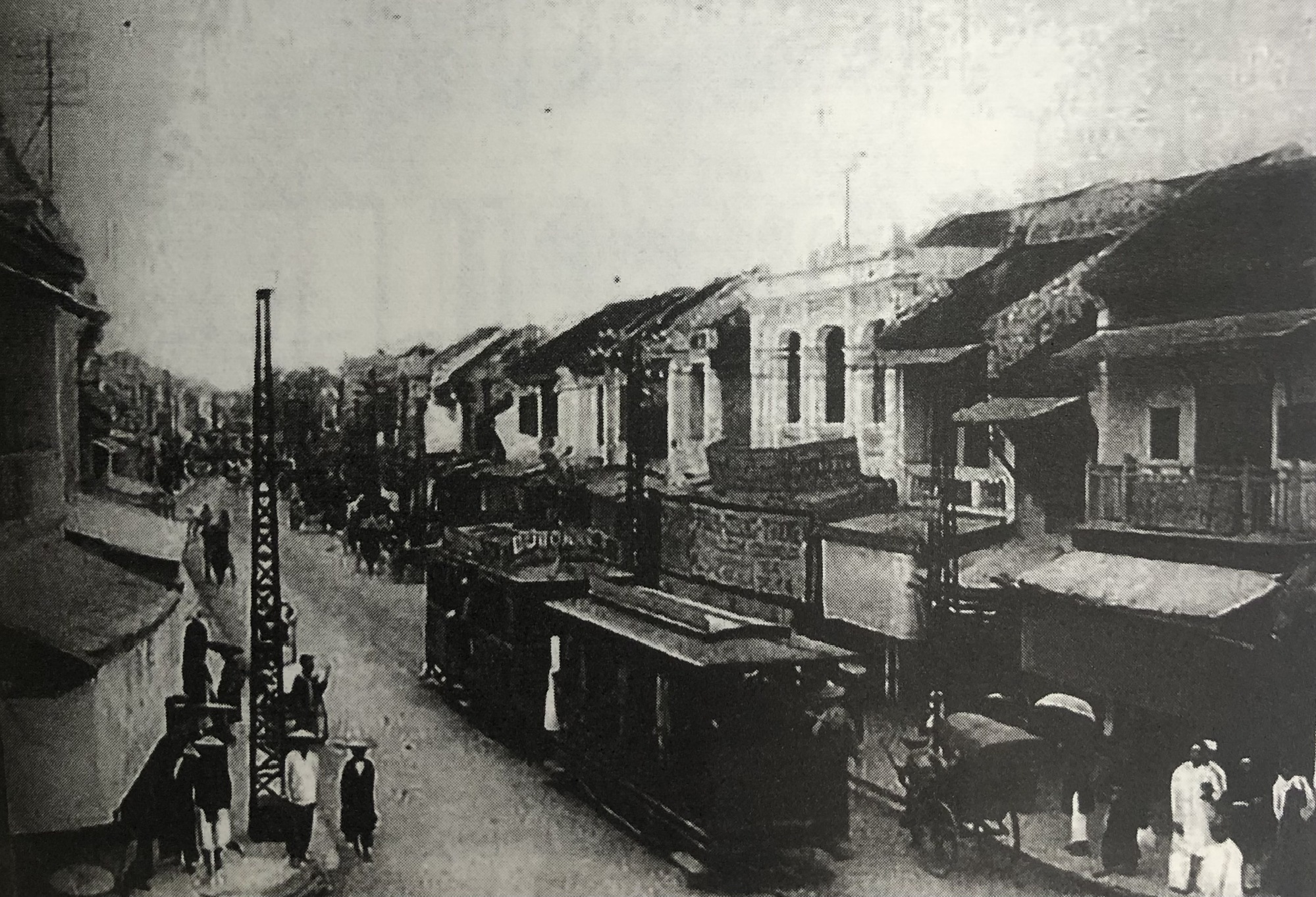
Hàng Đào street and tram railway in 1890s.

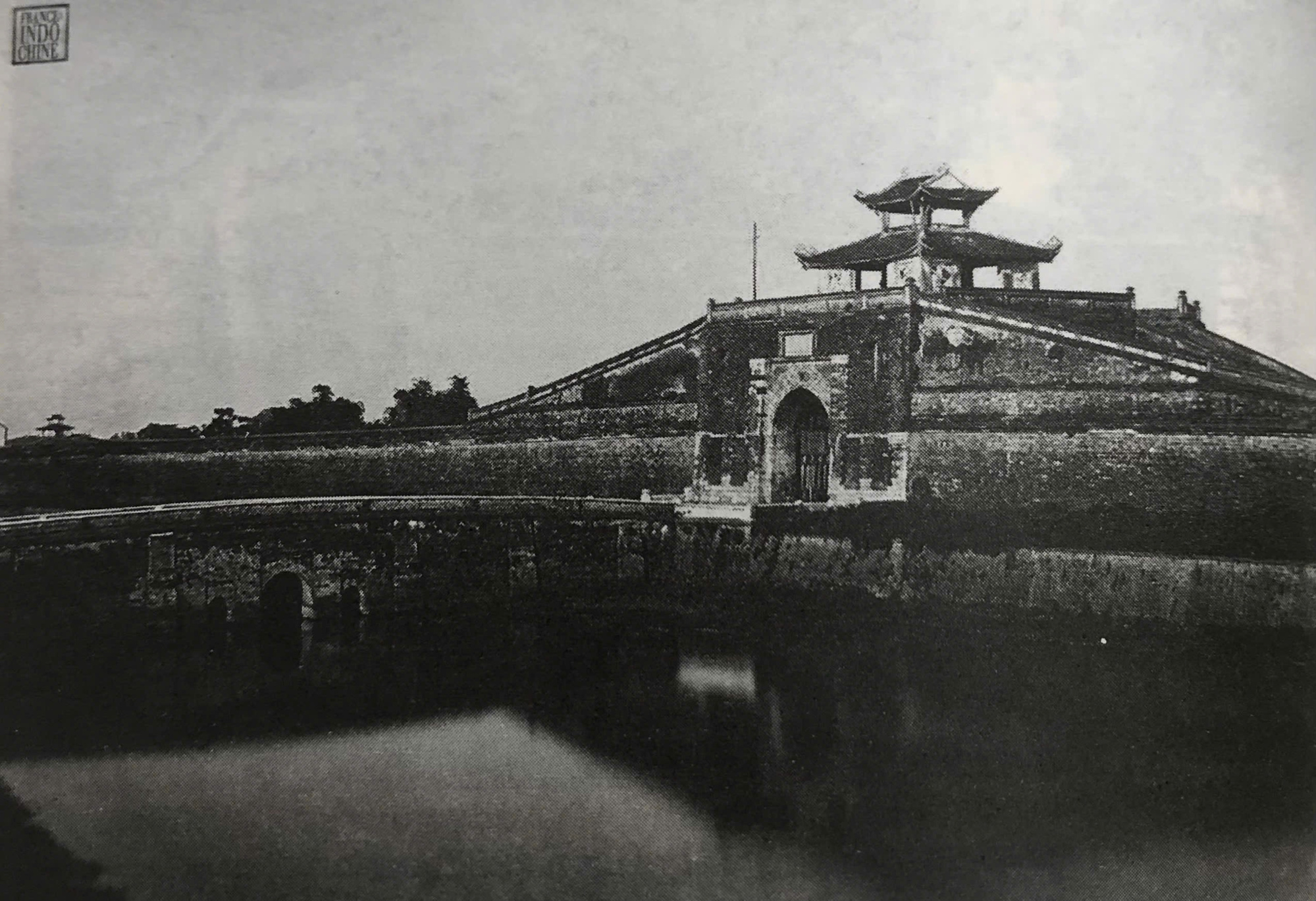
Northern gate of Hanoi citadel.

When the Nguyễn dynasty was established in 1802, Gia Long moved the capital to Huế. Thăng Long was no longer the capital, and its chữ Hán was changed from 昇龍 (lit. 'ascending dragon') to the homophone 昇隆 (lit. 'ascent and prosperity'), to reduce any loyalist sentiment towards the old Lê dynasty. In 1831, the Nguyễn king Minh Mạng renamed it Hà Nội (河內). Hanoi was conquered and occupied by the French military in 1873 and passed to them ten years later. As Hanoi, it was located in the protectorate of Tonkin and became the capital of French Indochina in 1902. Nominally it still belonged to the sovereignty of Vietnam (Nguyễn dynasty) under French protectorate in Tonkin, and since 1888 the city had been a French concession and had directly been ruled by the French like Cochinchina.

=== WWII, First Indochina War, and Vietnam War ===
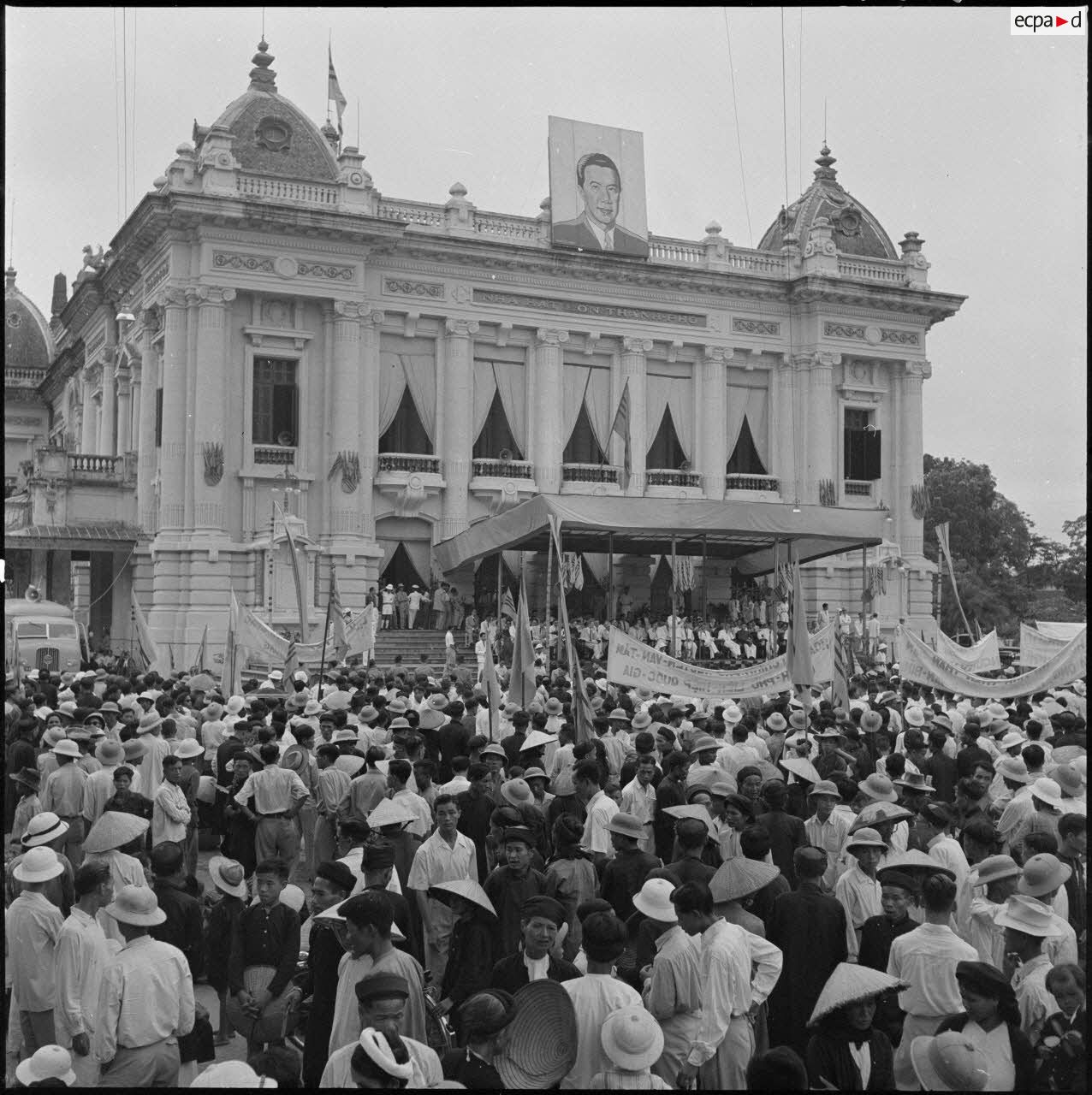
A crowd gathers in Hanoi for the presentation of a new Vietnamese cabinet, July 1952

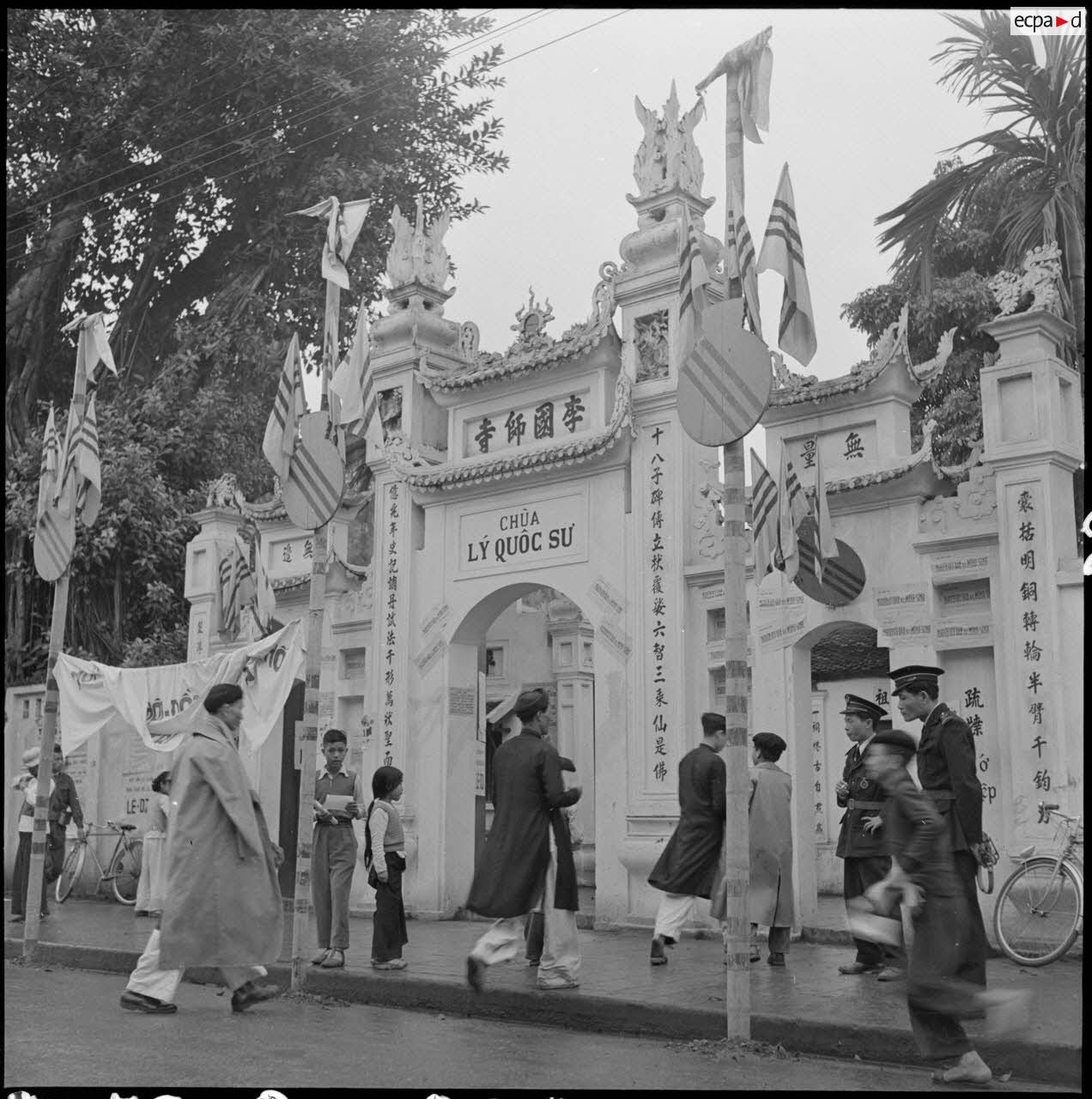
Municipal election in Hanoi, Vietnam, 25 January 1953.

French Indochina including Hanoi was occupied by the Imperial Japanese Armed Forces in September 1940, after the Japanese invasion of French Indochina. Japan overthrew the French rule in Hanoi and formed the Empire of Vietnam in March 1945. After the fall of the Empire of Vietnam, it became the capital of the Democratic Republic of Vietnam (DRV) when Ho Chi Minh proclaimed the independence of Vietnam on 2 September 1945. The French returned and reoccupied the city in February 1947. After France recognized Vietnam's nominal and partial independence with the Élysée Accords on 14 June 1949, Hanoi became under the control of the State of Vietnam from 1949 to 1954, a unified associated state within the French Union. This state gained full independence with the Matignon Accords on 4 June 1954. In January 1953, Hanoi held the free municipal elections of the State of Vietnam. After eight years of fighting between the French and DRV forces, Hanoi became the capital of North Vietnam when this territory became a sovereign country and Vietnam became divided at 17th parallel on 21 July 1954. The army of the French Union withdrew to the South that year and the People's Army of Vietnam of the DRV and International Control Commission occupied the city on 10 October the same year under the terms of the 1954 Geneva Conference.

During the Vietnam War between North and South (1955–1975), North Vietnam (including Hanoi) was attacked by the United States and South Vietnamese Air Forces. Following the end of the war with the fall of Saigon in 1975, Hanoi became the capital of the Socialist Republic of Vietnam when North and South Vietnam were reunited on 2 July 1976.

=== Socialist Republic ===
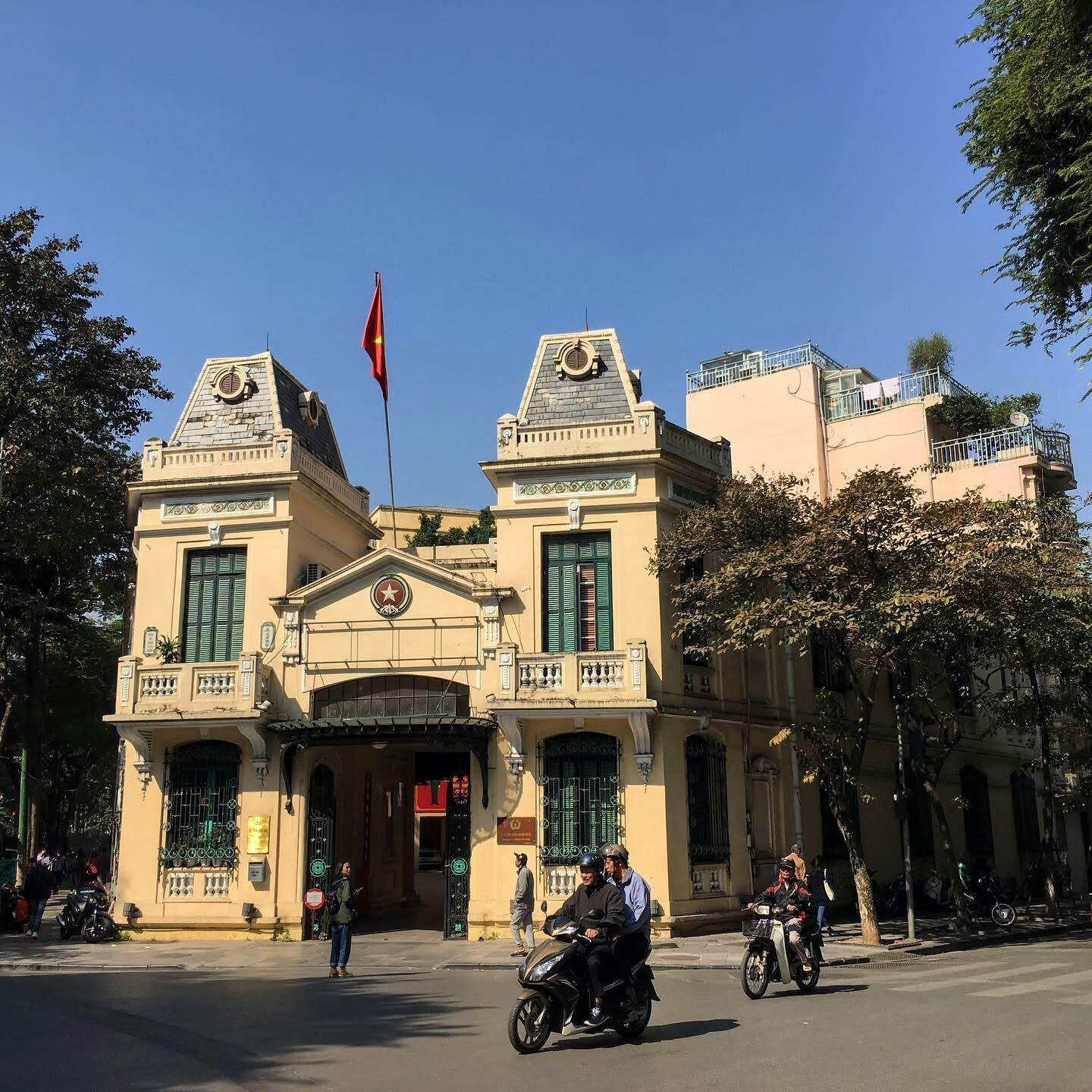
A local police station in a French Colonial building by Hoàn Kiếm lake.

After the Đổi Mới economic policies were approved in 1986, the Communist Party and national and municipal governments hoped to attract international investments for urban development projects in Hanoi. High-rise commercial buildings did not begin to appear until ten years later due to the international investment community being skeptical of the security of their investments in Vietnam. Urban development and rising costs displaced some residential areas in central Hanoi. Following a period of economic stagnation after the 1997 Asian financial crisis, Hanoi resumed its economic growth.

On 29 May 2008, it was decided that Hà Tây Province, Vĩnh Phúc Province's Mê Linh District and four communes in Lương Sơn District, Hòa Bình Province be merged into the metropolitan area of Hanoi from 1 August 2008. Hanoi's total area then increased to 334,470 hectares in 29 subdivisions with the new population being 6,232,940.

Public outcry in opposition to the redevelopment of culturally significant areas in Hanoi persuaded the national government to implement a low-rise policy surrounding Hoàn Kiếm Lake. The Ba Đình District is also protected from commercial redevelopment.

== Environment ==
Hanoi sometimes ranks among the "most polluted cities", with days each year when it is the most air-polluted city in the world. According to the 2018 Global Air Quality Report, Hanoi's fine dust concentration was four times higher than the WHO's recommended limit (40.8 μg/m^{3} compared to the recommended 10 μg/m^{3}). A report by Vietnam's Ministry of Natural Resources and Environment stated that Hanoi is the most air-polluted city in the country. The rivers flowing through Hanoi (Nhuệ River, Tô Lịch River, Kim Ngưu River, Lừ River, and Sét River) and some lakes are polluted, as 78% of Hanoi's wastewater is discharged directly into rivers and lakes without treatment. Each of these rivers receives tens of thousands of cubic meters of wastewater daily.

=== Climate ===
Hanoi, Vietnam

Climate chart (precipitation, max. and min. temperature)
J	F	M	A	M	J	J	A	S	O	N	D
20 20 14	20 22 16	36 26 21	104 29 22	165 33 25	264 35 27	254 34 27	274 33 26	244 32 25	155 30 23	61 27 20	20 21 14
- █ Average max. and min. temperatures in °C
- █ Precipitation totals in mm
- Source: Vietnam Institute for Building Science and Technology
Imperial conversion
J	F	M	A	M	J	J	A	S	O	N	D
0.8 68 58	0.8 71 62	1.4 79 69	4.1 83 71	6.5 91 77	10 95 80	10 93 80	11 92 78	9.6 89 77	6.1 87 73	2.4 80 68	0.8 70 57
- █ Average max. and min. temperatures in °F
- █ Precipitation totals in inches

When using the Köppen climate classification, Hanoi is categorized as having a monsoon-influenced humid subtropical climate (Köppen Cwa) with precipitation like other places in Northern Vietnam. The city experiences the typical climate of Northern Vietnam, with four distinct seasons. Summer, from May to September, is characterized by hot and humid weather with more rainfall, and fewer dry days. Hot, dry conditions caused by westerly winds during summer are rarer. From October to November comprise the fall season, characterized by a decrease in temperature and precipitation, this time in the year mostly are warm and mild. Winters, from December to February, are characterized as being cool by the northeast monsoon, giving Hanoi a dry winter. Spring, from March until the end of April, Hanoi is characterized with some amounts of drizzle and less sunshine due to the activity of the southeast monsoon blowing moisture from the sea inland.

The region has a positive water balance (i.e. the precipitation exceeds the potential evapotranspiration). Hanoi averages 1,612 millimetres (63.5 in) of rainfall per year, the majority falling from May to October. There are an average of 114 days with rain. The average annual temperature is 23.6 °C (74 °F), with a mean relative humidity of more than 80%. The coldest month has a mean temperature of 16.4 °C (61.5 °F) and the hottest month has a mean temperature of 29.2 °C (84.6 °F). The highest recorded temperature was 42.8 °C (109 °F) in May 1926, while the lowest recorded temperature was 2.7 °C (37 °F) on 12 January 1955. During a January 2016 cold wave, snow was seen to appear on the nearby Ba Vì mountain range, where the temperature fell to 0 °C (32 °F) on 24 January 2016.

Climate data for downtown Hanoi (Láng) (1991–2020 normals) located in (Đống Đa district)
Month	Jan	Feb	Mar	Apr	May	Jun	Jul	Aug	Sep	Oct	Nov	Dec	Year
Record high °C (°F)	33.3 (91.9)	35.1 (95.2)	37.4 (99.3)	41.5 (106.7)	42.8 (109.0)	41.8 (107.2)	40.5 (104.9)	40.3 (104.5)	39.0 (102.2)	37.1 (98.8)	36.0 (96.8)	31.9 (89.4)	42.8 (109.0)
Mean daily maximum °C (°F)	20.2 (68.4)	21.7 (71.1)	25.9 (78.6)	28.5 (83.3)	32.8 (91.0)	34.9 (94.8)	33.7 (92.7)	33.2 (91.8)	31.9 (89.4)	30.4 (86.7)	26.7 (80.1)	21.3 (70.3)	28.1 (82.6)
Daily mean °C (°F)	16.4 (61.5)	17.2 (63.0)	20.0 (68.0)	23.9 (75.0)	27.4 (81.3)	28.9 (84.0)	29.2 (84.6)	28.6 (83.5)	27.5 (81.5)	24.9 (76.8)	21.5 (70.7)	18.2 (64.8)	23.6 (74.5)
Mean daily minimum °C (°F)	14.1 (57.4)	16.4 (61.5)	20.5 (68.9)	22.4 (72.3)	25.0 (77.0)	26.6 (79.9)	26.5 (79.7)	25.8 (78.4)	25.0 (77.0)	22.8 (73.0)	20.0 (68.0)	13.8 (56.8)	21.6 (70.9)
Record low °C (°F)	2.7 (36.9)	5.0 (41.0)	7.0 (44.6)	9.8 (49.6)	15.4 (59.7)	20.0 (68.0)	21.0 (69.8)	20.9 (69.6)	16.1 (61.0)	12.0 (53.6)	6.8 (44.2)	5.1 (41.2)	2.7 (36.9)
Average rainfall mm (inches)	19.8 (0.78)	20.2 (0.80)	35.8 (1.41)	103.7 (4.08)	165.3 (6.51)	264.4 (10.41)	253.9 (10.00)	273.7 (10.78)	228.3 (8.99)	155.1 (6.11)	60.7 (2.39)	19.5 (0.77)	1,616.4 (63.64)
Average rainy days	10.3	12.4	15.9	14.1	14.2	14.7	15.7	17.2	13.9	11.2	8.1	5.1	152.8
Average relative humidity (%)	80	84	88	87	83	79	79	82	81	79	77	75	81.2
Mean monthly sunshine hours	74	45	47	90	183	171	196	159	156	143	123	124	1,511
Source 1: World Meteorological Organization and the Vietnam Institute for Building Science and Technology
Source 2: Extremes (Note: All-time record high;Vietnamnet.vn (May record high and January record low only), Vietnamnet.vn (June record high only), nchmf.gov.vn (August record high only), Nchmf.gov.vn, January record high, November record high, April and May record low in The Yearbook of Indochina)

Climate data for Hà Đông District
Month	Jan	Feb	Mar	Apr	May	Jun	Jul	Aug	Sep	Oct	Nov	Dec	Year
Record high °C (°F)	32.4 (90.3)	34.9 (94.8)	38.9 (102.0)	39.9 (103.8)	41.3 (106.3)	42.5 (108.5)	40.0 (104.0)	39.6 (103.3)	37.5 (99.5)	36.5 (97.7)	35.0 (95.0)	30.7 (87.3)	42.5 (108.5)
Mean daily maximum °C (°F)	19.9 (67.8)	20.8 (69.4)	23.3 (73.9)	27.5 (81.5)	31.5 (88.7)	33.4 (92.1)	33.2 (91.8)	32.4 (90.3)	31.3 (88.3)	29.2 (84.6)	25.8 (78.4)	22.1 (71.8)	27.5 (81.5)
Daily mean °C (°F)	16.5 (61.7)	17.8 (64.0)	20.3 (68.5)	24.0 (75.2)	27.1 (80.8)	29.0 (84.2)	29.1 (84.4)	28.4 (83.1)	27.2 (81.0)	24.9 (76.8)	21.6 (70.9)	18.0 (64.4)	23.7 (74.7)
Mean daily minimum °C (°F)	14.3 (57.7)	15.8 (60.4)	18.4 (65.1)	21.7 (71.1)	24.3 (75.7)	26.0 (78.8)	26.3 (79.3)	25.8 (78.4)	24.6 (76.3)	22.7 (72.9)	18.7 (65.7)	15.3 (59.5)	21.1 (70.0)
Record low °C (°F)	5.4 (41.7)	6.1 (43.0)	7.3 (45.1)	13.3 (55.9)	16.5 (61.7)	20.4 (68.7)	22.5 (72.5)	21.9 (71.4)	19.0 (66.2)	12.0 (53.6)	8.4 (47.1)	3.6 (38.5)	3.6 (38.5)
Average rainfall mm (inches)	28.2 (1.11)	26.5 (1.04)	45.0 (1.77)	83.1 (3.27)	189.4 (7.46)	232.5 (9.15)	254.6 (10.02)	293.5 (11.56)	228.8 (9.01)	184.8 (7.28)	87.4 (3.44)	36.9 (1.45)	1,687.6 (66.44)
Average rainy days	9.6	11.7	15.2	13.6	14.5	14.4	15.6	16.3	13.7	10.8	7.6	6.2	149.8
Average relative humidity (%)	83.3	85.3	86.8	88.1	85.5	82.5	82.5	85.7	86.1	82.9	81.2	80.2	84.2
Mean monthly sunshine hours	65.7	49.7	50.1	87.8	170.2	167.1	181.9	167.0	162.4	146.1	133.2	110.3	1,477.8
Source: Vietnam Institute for Building Science and Technology

Climate data for Sơn Tây
Month	Jan	Feb	Mar	Apr	May	Jun	Jul	Aug	Sep	Oct	Nov	Dec	Year
Record high °C (°F)	31.4 (88.5)	34.0 (93.2)	38.0 (100.4)	40.4 (104.7)	40.5 (104.9)	41.6 (106.9)	40.1 (104.2)	39.8 (103.6)	37.6 (99.7)	36.0 (96.8)	34.0 (93.2)	31.2 (88.2)	41.6 (106.9)
Mean daily maximum °C (°F)	19.7 (67.5)	20.7 (69.3)	23.4 (74.1)	27.7 (81.9)	31.8 (89.2)	33.2 (91.8)	33.2 (91.8)	32.5 (90.5)	31.5 (88.7)	29.3 (84.7)	25.8 (78.4)	22.1 (71.8)	27.6 (81.7)
Daily mean °C (°F)	16.3 (61.3)	17.6 (63.7)	20.2 (68.4)	24.0 (75.2)	27.2 (81.0)	28.9 (84.0)	28.9 (84.0)	28.4 (83.1)	27.3 (81.1)	25.0 (77.0)	21.5 (70.7)	17.9 (64.2)	23.6 (74.5)
Mean daily minimum °C (°F)	14.1 (57.4)	15.6 (60.1)	18.2 (64.8)	21.5 (70.7)	24.2 (75.6)	25.9 (78.6)	26.0 (78.8)	25.7 (78.3)	24.7 (76.5)	22.3 (72.1)	18.5 (65.3)	15.3 (59.5)	21.1 (70.0)
Record low °C (°F)	4.6 (40.3)	5.4 (41.7)	4.5 (40.1)	13.0 (55.4)	17.3 (63.1)	20.4 (68.7)	19.5 (67.1)	19.8 (67.6)	17.2 (63.0)	14.4 (57.9)	9.2 (48.6)	5.1 (41.2)	4.5 (40.1)
Average rainfall mm (inches)	25.6 (1.01)	24.6 (0.97)	43.3 (1.70)	96.1 (3.78)	216.6 (8.53)	262.9 (10.35)	311.8 (12.28)	314.6 (12.39)	224.3 (8.83)	158.4 (6.24)	63.0 (2.48)	22.0 (0.87)	1,751.2 (68.94)
Average rainy days	9.7	11.1	14.6	13.5	15.5	15.6	16.9	16.5	13.1	9.7	6.9	6.0	149.1
Average relative humidity (%)	83.8	85.0	86.7	87.2	84.6	82.9	83.6	85.4	84.6	82.4	81.3	80.4	84.0
Mean monthly sunshine hours	65.5	48.8	49.3	91.6	172.4	165.4	181.1	173.4	170.5	151.3	130.5	108.9	1,494.7
Source: Vietnam Institute for Building Science and Technology, Nchmf.gov.vn (August record high)

Climate data for Ba Vì District
Month	Jan	Feb	Mar	Apr	May	Jun	Jul	Aug	Sep	Oct	Nov	Dec	Year
Record high °C (°F)	31.9 (89.4)	34.8 (94.6)	38.9 (102.0)	41.2 (106.2)	41.6 (106.9)	40.8 (105.4)	39.6 (103.3)	39.5 (103.1)	37.3 (99.1)	35.5 (95.9)	35.0 (95.0)	32.4 (90.3)	41.6 (106.9)
Mean daily maximum °C (°F)	19.4 (66.9)	20.7 (69.3)	23.3 (73.9)	27.6 (81.7)	31.5 (88.7)	33.1 (91.6)	32.9 (91.2)	32.4 (90.3)	31.4 (88.5)	29.0 (84.2)	25.5 (77.9)	21.8 (71.2)	27.4 (81.3)
Daily mean °C (°F)	16.0 (60.8)	17.6 (63.7)	20.2 (68.4)	24.0 (75.2)	27.1 (80.8)	28.7 (83.7)	28.7 (83.7)	28.1 (82.6)	27.0 (80.6)	24.5 (76.1)	21.0 (69.8)	17.4 (63.3)	23.4 (74.1)
Mean daily minimum °C (°F)	13.7 (56.7)	15.5 (59.9)	17.9 (64.2)	21.5 (70.7)	24.0 (75.2)	25.6 (78.1)	25.7 (78.3)	25.3 (77.5)	24.2 (75.6)	21.7 (71.1)	17.9 (64.2)	14.4 (57.9)	20.6 (69.1)
Record low °C (°F)	4.0 (39.2)	6.1 (43.0)	7.0 (44.6)	12.4 (54.3)	17.1 (62.8)	20.1 (68.2)	19.9 (67.8)	21.0 (69.8)	17.3 (63.1)	12.8 (55.0)	6.7 (44.1)	2.8 (37.0)	2.8 (37.0)
Average rainfall mm (inches)	27.4 (1.08)	32.8 (1.29)	51.9 (2.04)	97.2 (3.83)	263.4 (10.37)	276.1 (10.87)	328.0 (12.91)	344.9 (13.58)	245.4 (9.66)	189.9 (7.48)	56.2 (2.21)	22.4 (0.88)	1,935.6 (76.20)
Average rainy days	11.0	12.0	15.5	14.6	16.5	16.5	17.4	17.0	13.2	10.6	7.1	5.9	157.6
Average relative humidity (%)	84.7	86.0	86.6	86.8	84.2	82.5	83.7	85.8	84.5	83.0	81.6	81.3	84.3
Mean monthly sunshine hours	63.2	50.3	48.2	78.9	157.0	160.8	173.3	170.9	175.1	151.8	134.4	115.0	1,477.2
Source: Vietnam Institute for Building Science and Technology, Nchmf.gov.vn (August record high)

== Demographics ==
During the French colonial period, as the capital of French Indochina, Hanoi attracted a number of French, Chinese and Vietnamese from the surrounding areas. In the 1940s the population of the city was 132,145. In 1954, the city had 53 thousand inhabitants, covering an area of 152 km^{2}. By 1961, the area of the city had expanded to 584 km^{2}, and the population was 91,000 people. In 1978, National Assembly (Vietnam) decided to expand Hanoi for the second time to 2,136 km^{2}, with a population of 2.5 million people. By 1991, the area of Hanoi continued to change, decreasing to 924 km^{2} (357 sq mi), and the population was still over 2 million people. Hanoi's population reached 2,672,122 people in 1999. After the expansion in August 2008, Hanoi has a population of 6.233 million and is among the 17 capitals with the largest area in the world. According to the 2009 census, Hanoi's population is 6,451,909 people. As of 1 April 2019, Hanoi had a population of 8,053,663, including 3,991,919 males and 4,061,744 females. There are more than 50 ethnic groups in Hanoi, of which the Viet (Kinh) is the largest; according to official Vietnamese figures (2019 census), accounting for 98.66% of the population, followed by Mường at 0.77% and Tày at 0.24%.

In the Old Quarter, where commerce started hundreds of years ago and consisted mostly of family businesses, some of the street-front stores are owned by merchants and retailers from other provinces. The original owner family may have either rented out the store and moved into the adjoining house or moved out of the neighborhood altogether. The pace of change has escalated after the abandonment of central-planning economic policies and relaxing of the district-based household registrar system.

== Economy ==
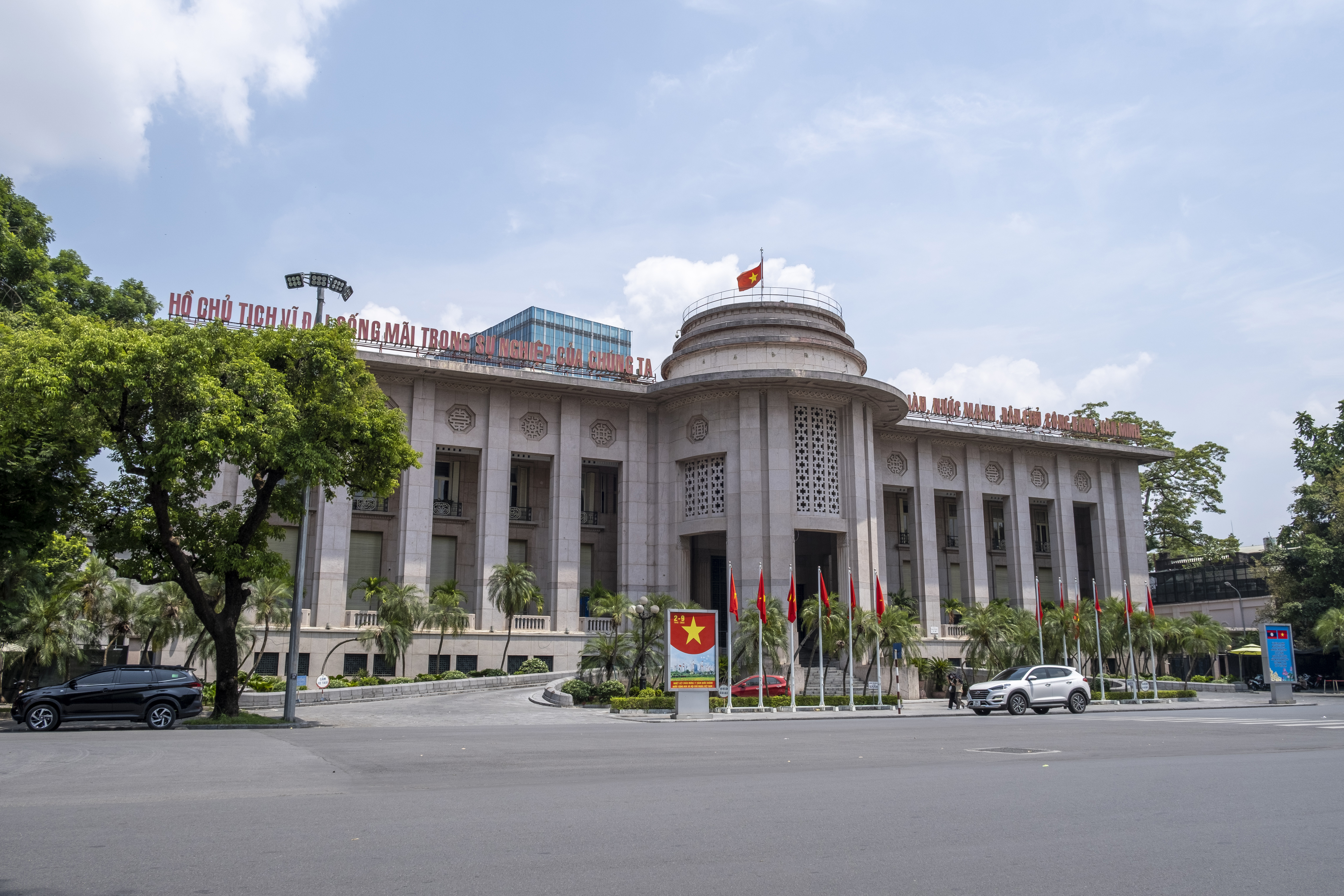
Headquarters of the State Bank of Vietnam.

According to a ranking by PricewaterhouseCoopers, Hanoi and Ho Chi Minh City will be amongst the fastest-growing cities in the world in terms of GDP growth from 2008 to 2025. In the year 2013, Hanoi contributed 12.6% to GDP, exported 7.5% of total exports, contributed 17% to the national budget and attracted 22% investment capital of Vietnam. The city's nominal GDP reached 451,213 billion VND (US$21.48 billion) in 2013, which made per capita GDP stand at 63.3 million VND (US$3,000). Industrial production in the city has an average annual growth of 19.1% from 1991 to 1995, 15.9% from 1996 to 2000, and 18.7% during 2001–2005.

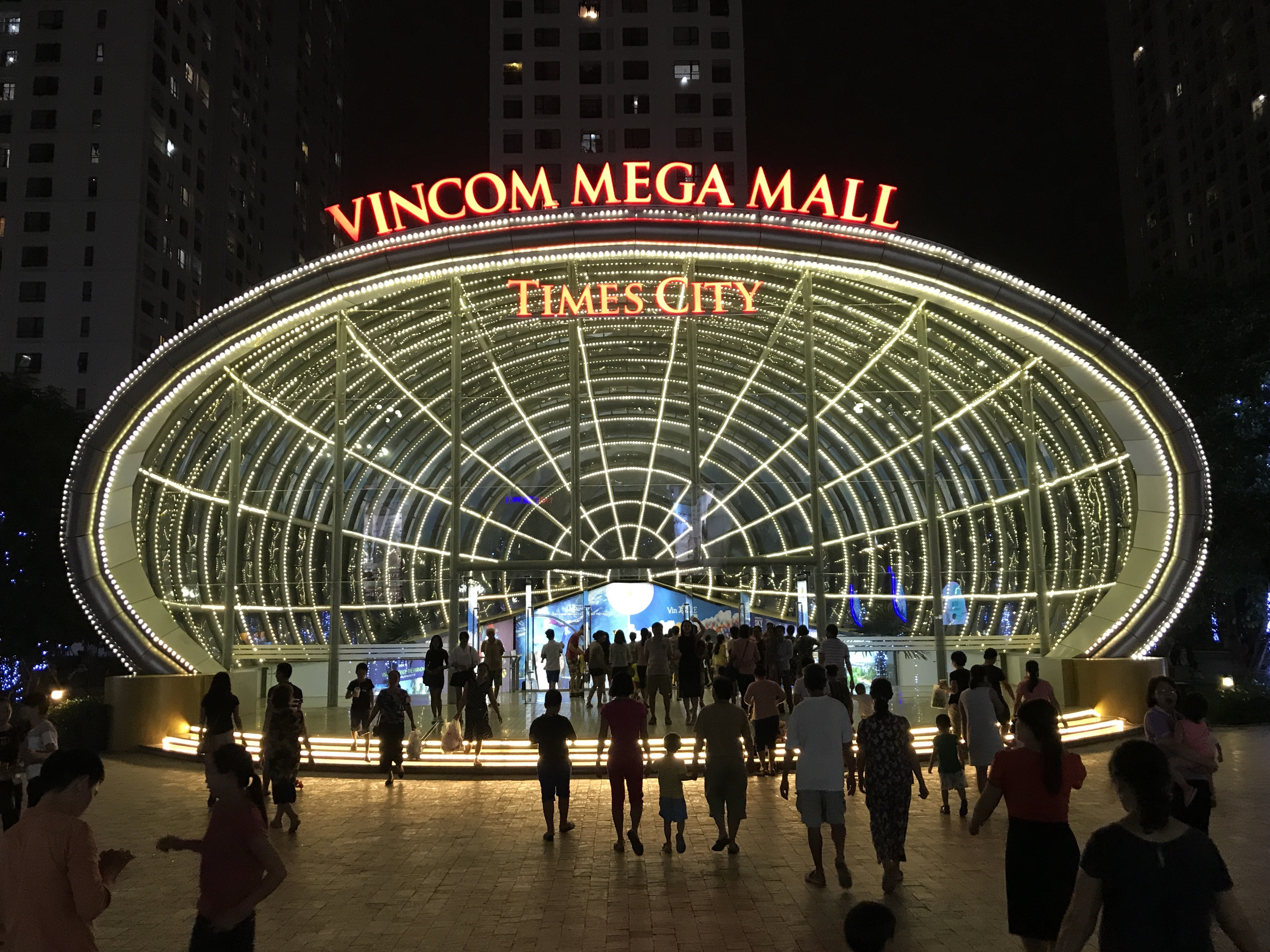
A shopping center in Hanoi owned by Vingroup.

Agriculture has striven to reform itself, introducing new high-yield plant varieties and livestock, and applying more modern farming techniques.

Infrastructure is being upgraded, with new roads and an improved public transportation system. Hanoi has allowed fast-food chains into the city, such as McDonald's, Lotteria, Pizza Hut, KFC, Popeyes, Domino's Pizza, Jolibee and others. Locals in Hanoi perceive the ability to purchase "fast-food" as an indication of luxury and permanent fixtures. City officials are motivated by food safety concerns and their aspirations for a "modern" city to replace the 67 traditional food markets with 1,000 supermarkets by 2025.

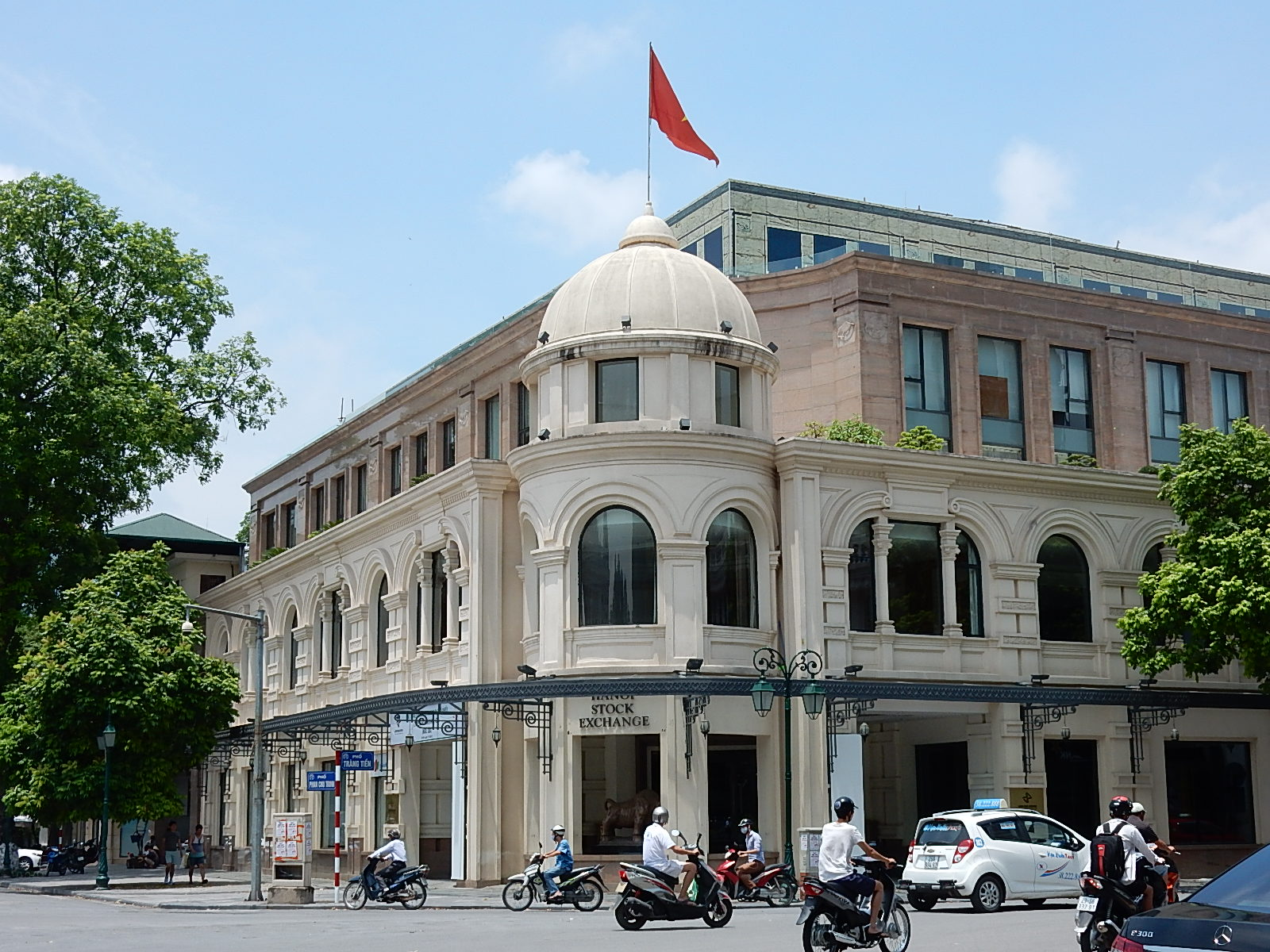
The Hanoi Stock Exchange in downtown Hanoi.

Over three-quarters of the jobs in Hanoi are state-owned. 9% of jobs are provided by collectively owned organizations and 13.3% of jobs are in the private sector. The structure of employment has been changing as state-owned institutions downsize and private enterprises grow. Hanoi has in-migration controls which allow the city to accept only people who add skills to Hanoi's economy. A 2006 census found that 5,600 rural produce vendors exist in Hanoi, with 90% of them coming from surrounding rural areas. These numbers indicate the greater earning potential in urban rather than in rural spaces. The uneducated, rural, and mostly female street vendors are depicted as participants of "microbusiness" and local grassroots economic development by business reports. In July 2008, Hanoi's city government devised a policy to partially ban street vendors and side-walk based commerce on 62 streets due to concerns about public health and "modernizing" the city's image to attract foreigners. Some foreigners believe that the vendors add a traditional and nostalgic aura to the city. The vendors have not able to form effective resistance tactics to the ban and remain embedded in the dominant capitalist framework of Hanoi.

Hanoi is part of the Maritime Silk Road that runs from the Chinese coast through the Strait of Malacca towards the southern tip of India to Mombasa, from there through the Red Sea via the Suez Canal to the Mediterranean, there to the Upper Adriatic region to the northern Italian hub of Trieste with its rail connections to Central Europe and the North Sea.

On Vietnam's Provincial Competitiveness Index 2023, a key tool for evaluating the business environment in Vietnam's provinces, Hanoi received a score of 67.15. This was an improvement from 2022 in which the province received a score of 66.74. In 2023, the province received its highest scores on the 'Labor Policy' and 'Time Costs' criterion and lowest on 'Access To Land' and 'Proactivity'.

== Development ==
=== Infrastructure ===
A development master plan for Hanoi was designed by Ernest Hebrard in 1924, and was partially implemented. The previous relationship between the Soviet Union and Vietnam led to the creation of the first comprehensive plan for Hanoi with the assistance of Soviet planners between 1981 and 1984. It was never realized because it appeared to be incompatible with Hanoi's existing layout.

Two master plans have been created to guide Hanoi's development. The first was the Hanoi Master Plan 1990–2010, approved in April 1992. It was created out of collaboration between planners from Hanoi and the National Institute of Urban and Rural Planning in the Ministry of Construction. The plan's three main objectives were to create housing and a new commercial center in an area known as Nghĩa Đô, expand residential and industrial areas in the Gia Lâm District, and develop the three southern corridors linking Hanoi to Hà Đông and the Thanh Trì District. The result of the land-use pattern was meant to resemble a five cornered star by 2010. In 1998, a revised version of the Hanoi Master plan was approved to be completed in 2020. It addressed the significant increase of population projections within Hanoi. Population densities and high rise buildings in the inner city were planned to be limited to protect the old parts of inner Hanoi. A rail transport system is planned to be built to expand public transport and link the Hanoi to surrounding areas. Projects such as airport upgrading, a golf course, and cultural villages have been approved for development by the government.

In the 1980s, the United Nations Development Programme (UNDP) and the Vietnamese government had designed a project to develop rural infrastructure. The project focused on improving roads, water supply and sanitation, and educational, health and social facilities because economic development in the communes and rural areas surrounding Hanoi is dependent on the infrastructural links between the rural and urban areas, especially for the sale of rural products. The project aimed to use locally available resources and knowledge such as compressed earth construction techniques for building. It was jointly funded by the UNDP, the Vietnamese government, and resources raised by the local communities and governments. In four communes, the local communities contributed 37% of the total budget. Local labor, community support, and joint funding were decided as necessary for the long-term sustainability of the project.

=== Civil society ===
Part of the goals of the Đổi Mới economic reforms was to decentralize governance for purpose of economic improvement. This led to the establishment of the first issue-oriented civic organizations in Hanoi. In the 1990s, Hanoi experienced poverty alleviation as a result of the market reforms and civil society movements. Most of the civic organizations in Hanoi were established after 1995, at a rate slower than in Ho Chi Minh City. Organizations in Hanoi are more "tradition-bound", focused on policy, education, research, professional interests, and appealing to governmental organizations to solve social problems. This marked difference from Ho Chi Minh's civic organizations, which practice more direct intervention to tackle social issues, may be attributed to the different societal identities of North and South Vietnam. Hanoi-based civic organizations use more systematic development and less of a direct intervention approach to deal with issues of rural development, poverty alleviation, and environmental protection. They rely more heavily on full-time staff than volunteers. In Hanoi, 16.7% of civic organizations accept anyone as a registered member and 73.9% claim to have their own budgets, as opposed to 90.9% in Ho Chi Minh City. A majority of the civic organizations in Hanoi find it difficult to work with governmental organizations. Some of the strained relations between non-governmental and governmental organizations results from statism, a bias against non-state organizations on the part of government entities.

== Landmarks ==
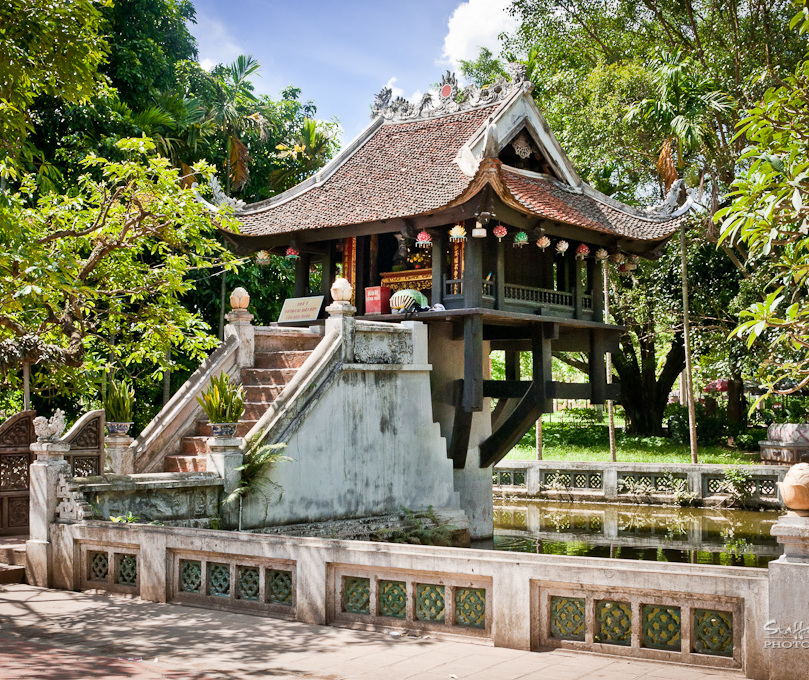
One Pillar Pagoda (Chùa Một Cột).

While some relics have not survived through wars and time, the city still has other cultural and historic monuments. The French took control in 1888 and modeled the city's architecture to their tastes, lending an aesthetic to the city's heritage. The city hosts more cultural sites than any other city in Vietnam, and has more than 1,000 years of history; that of several hundred years had been preserved.

=== Old Quarter ===
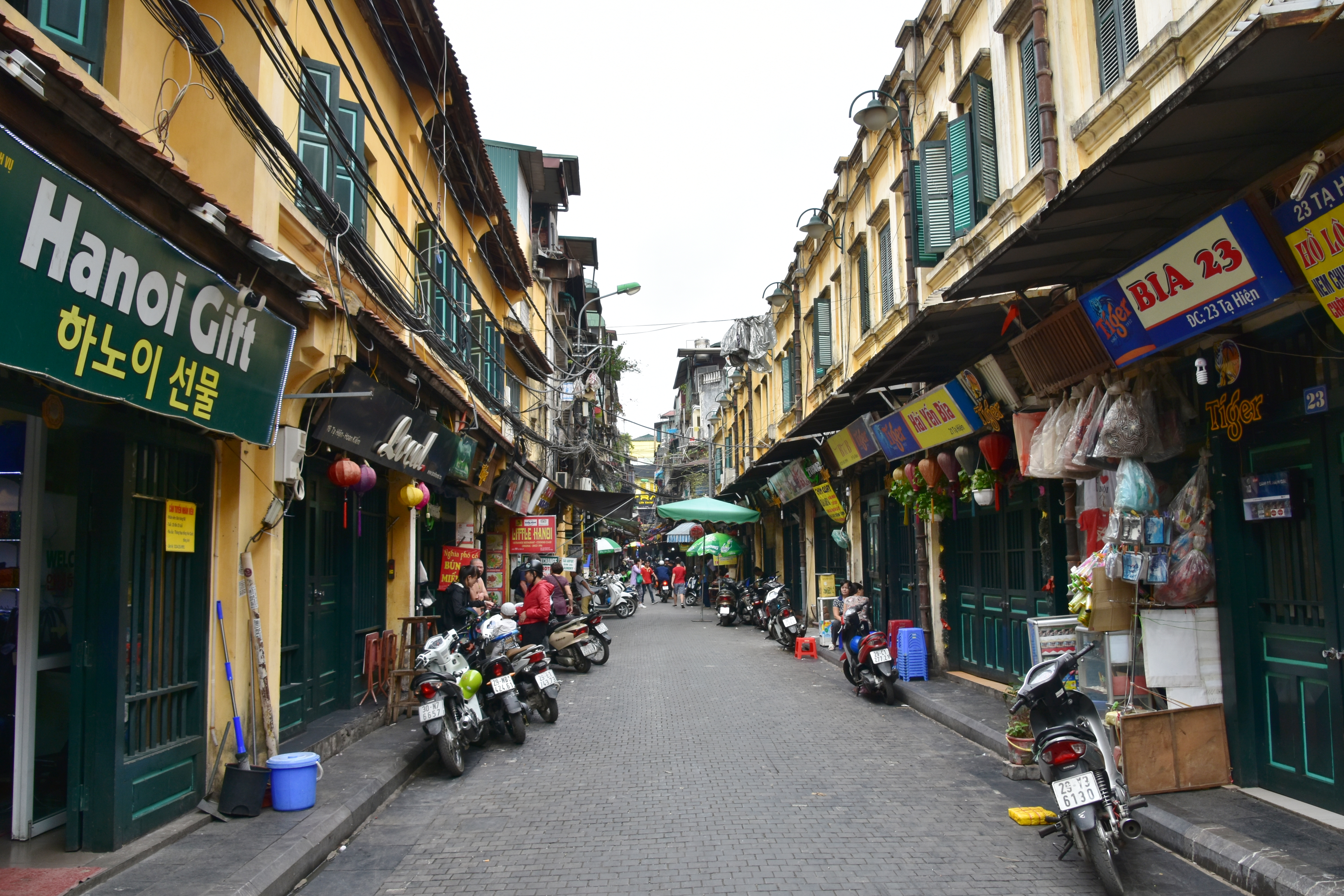
A street in Hanoi's Old Quarter.

The Old Quarter, near Hoàn Kiếm Lake, maintains most of the original street layout and some of the architecture of older Hanoi. At the beginning of the 20th century Hanoi consisted of the "36 streets", the citadel, and some of the newer French buildings south of Hoàn Kiếm lake, most of which later are part of Hoàn Kiếm district. Each street had merchants and households specializing in a particular trade, such as silk, jewelry or bamboo. The street names reflect these specializations, while some of them remain exclusively in their original commerce.

The city's more than six decades of French colonization, and centuries of sociocultural influence from China, have influenced the designs of the old houses in Hanoi. The Franco-Chinese or hybrid architectural styles can be reflected in the front of a house in the co-existence of French-styled columns, Confucian scrolls, the Taoist yin-yang sign, and the Buddhist lotus sculpture.

=== Imperial sites ===
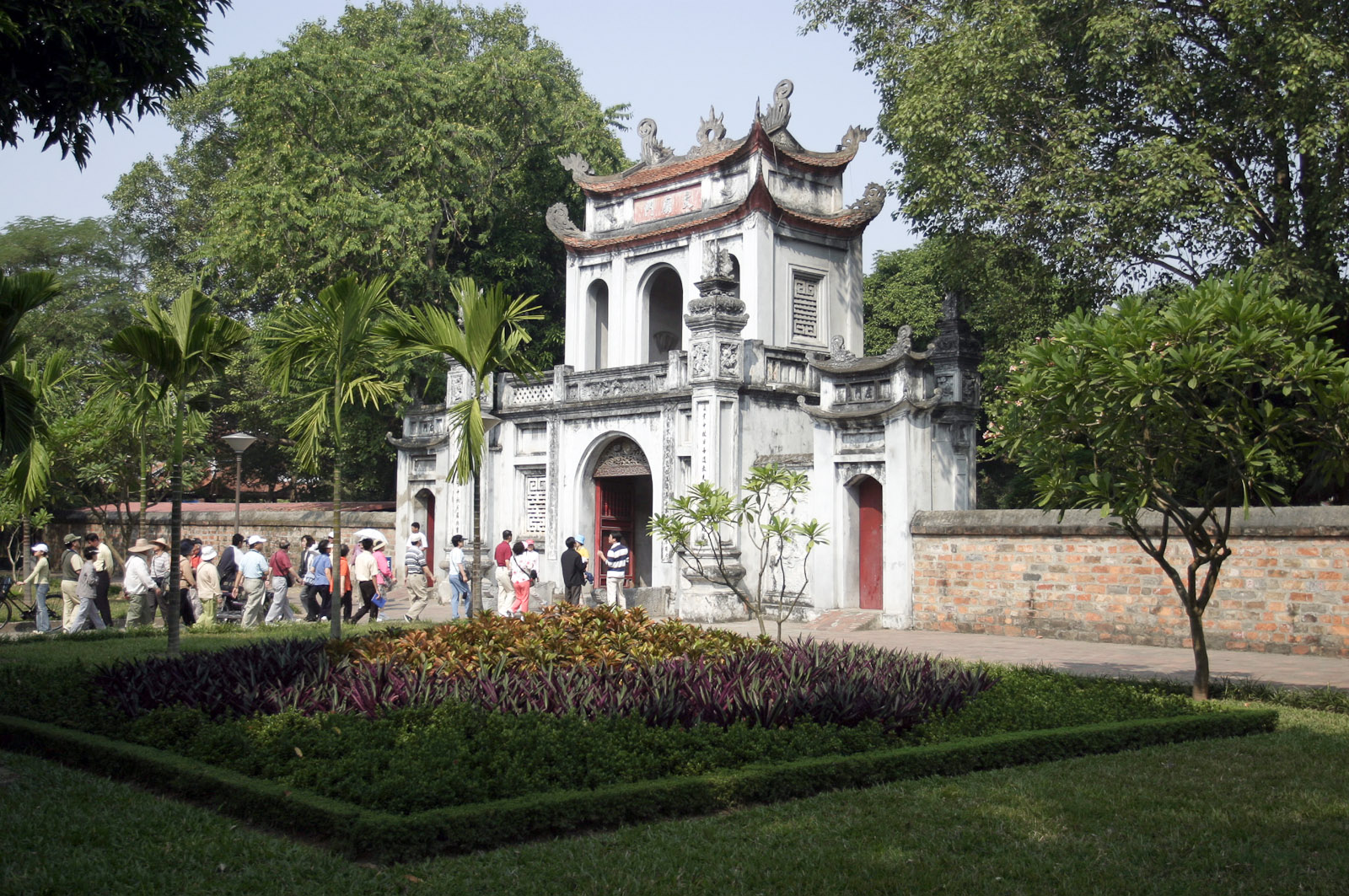
Front gate of the Temple of Literature.

Imperial sites are mostly in Ba Đình District and a bit of Đống Đa District. They are juxtaposed with French colonial architecture (villas, administrative buildings and tree-lined boulevards). Some prominent edifices from feudal time include the Temple of Literature (Văn Miếu), site of the oldest university in Vietnam which was started in 1010, the One Pillar Pagoda (Chùa Một Cột) which was built based on the dream of king Lý Thái Tông (1028–1054) in 1049, and the Flag Tower of Hanoi (Cột cờ Hà Nội). In 2004, a part of the 900-year-old Hanoi Citadel was discovered in central Hanoi, near the site of Ba Đình Square.

=== Colonial sites ===
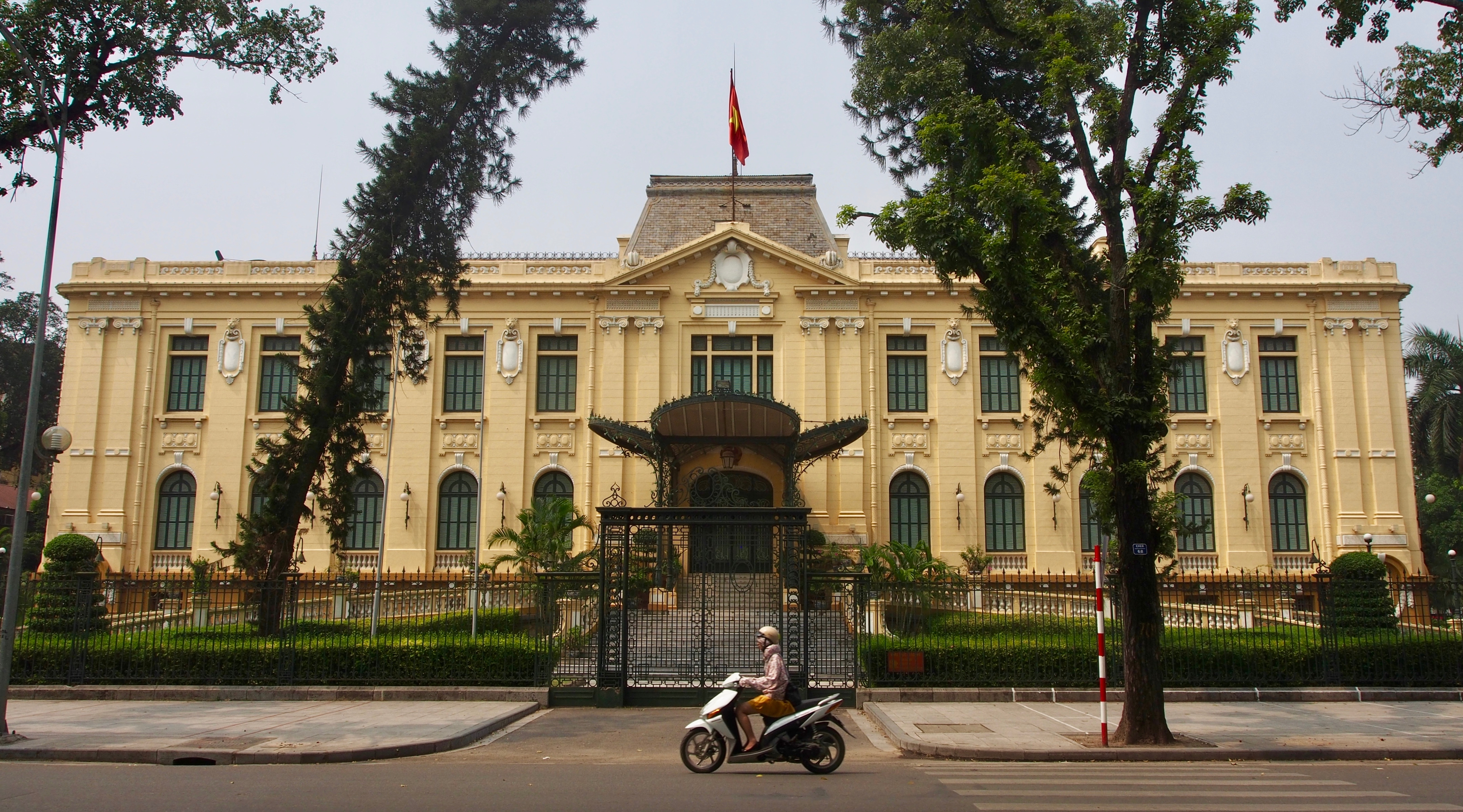
The Tonkin Palace used to host the French Governor of Tonkin.

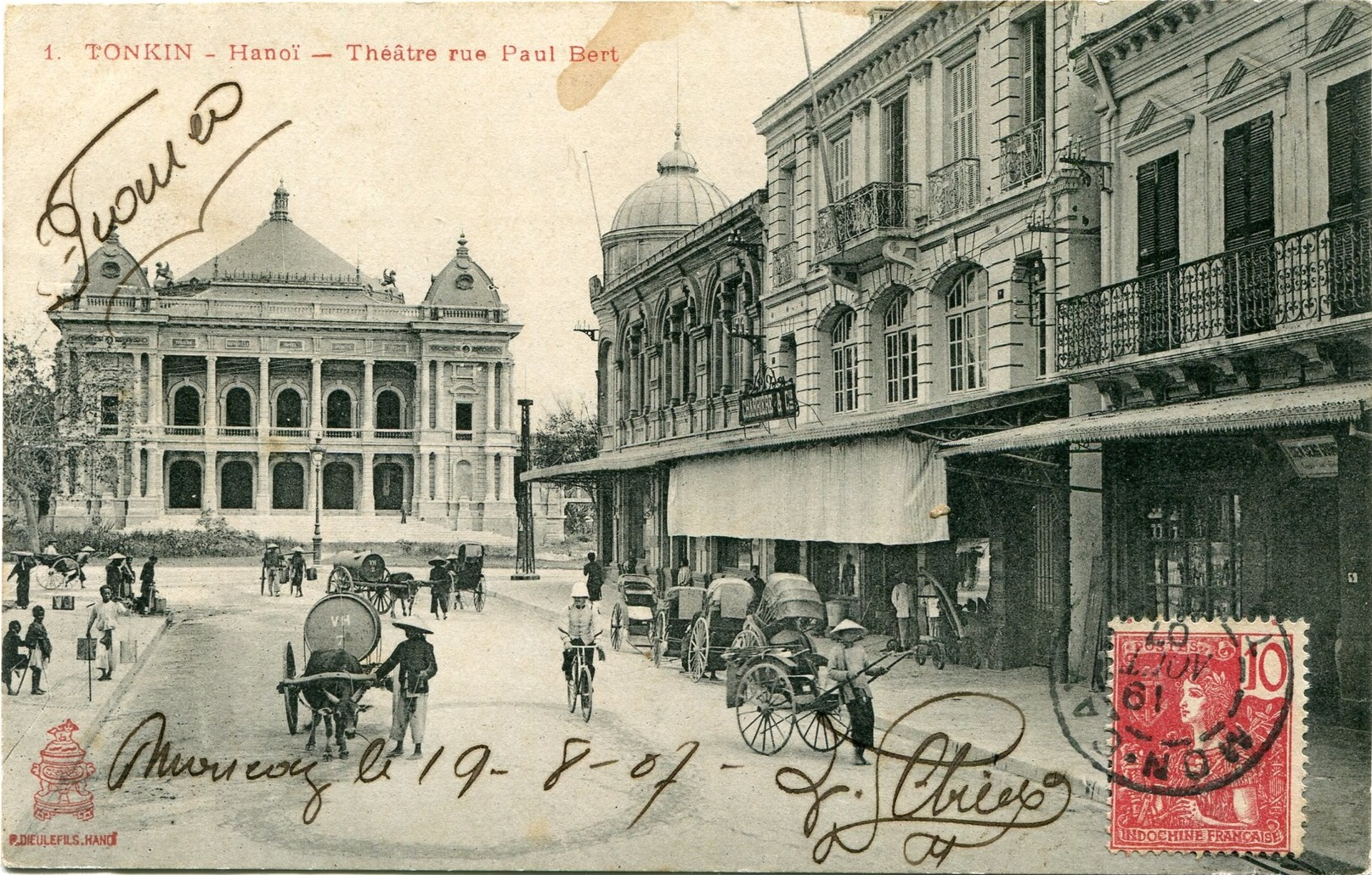
The Hanoi Opera House, taken in the 20th century, from rue Paul Bert.

Hanoi was the capital and the administrative center for French Indochina for most of the colonial period (from 1902 to 1945). The French colonial architectural style became dominant, and examples remained: tree-lined boulevards (such as Phan Dinh Phung street, Hoang Dieu street and Tran Phu street) and villas, mansions, and government buildings. Some colonial structures are an eclectic mixture of French and Vietnamese architectural styles, such as the National Museum of Vietnamese History, the Vietnam National Museum of Fine Arts and the old Indochina Medical College. Gouveneur-Général Paul Doumer (1898–1902) played a role in colonial Hanoi's urban planning.

== Tourism ==
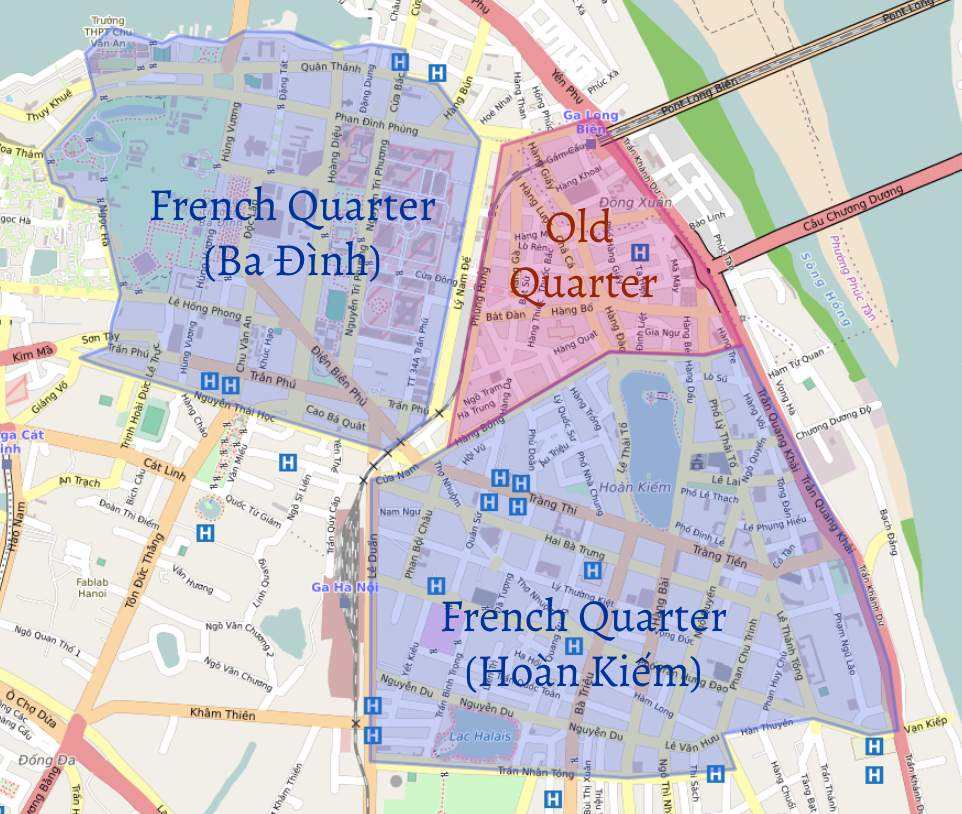
Approximation of Hanoi's Old Quarter and French Quarters.

According to Mastercard's 2019 report, Hanoi is Vietnam's most visited city (15th in Asia Pacific), with 4.8 million overnight international visitors in 2018. Hanoi is sometimes dubbed the "Paris of the East" for its French influences.

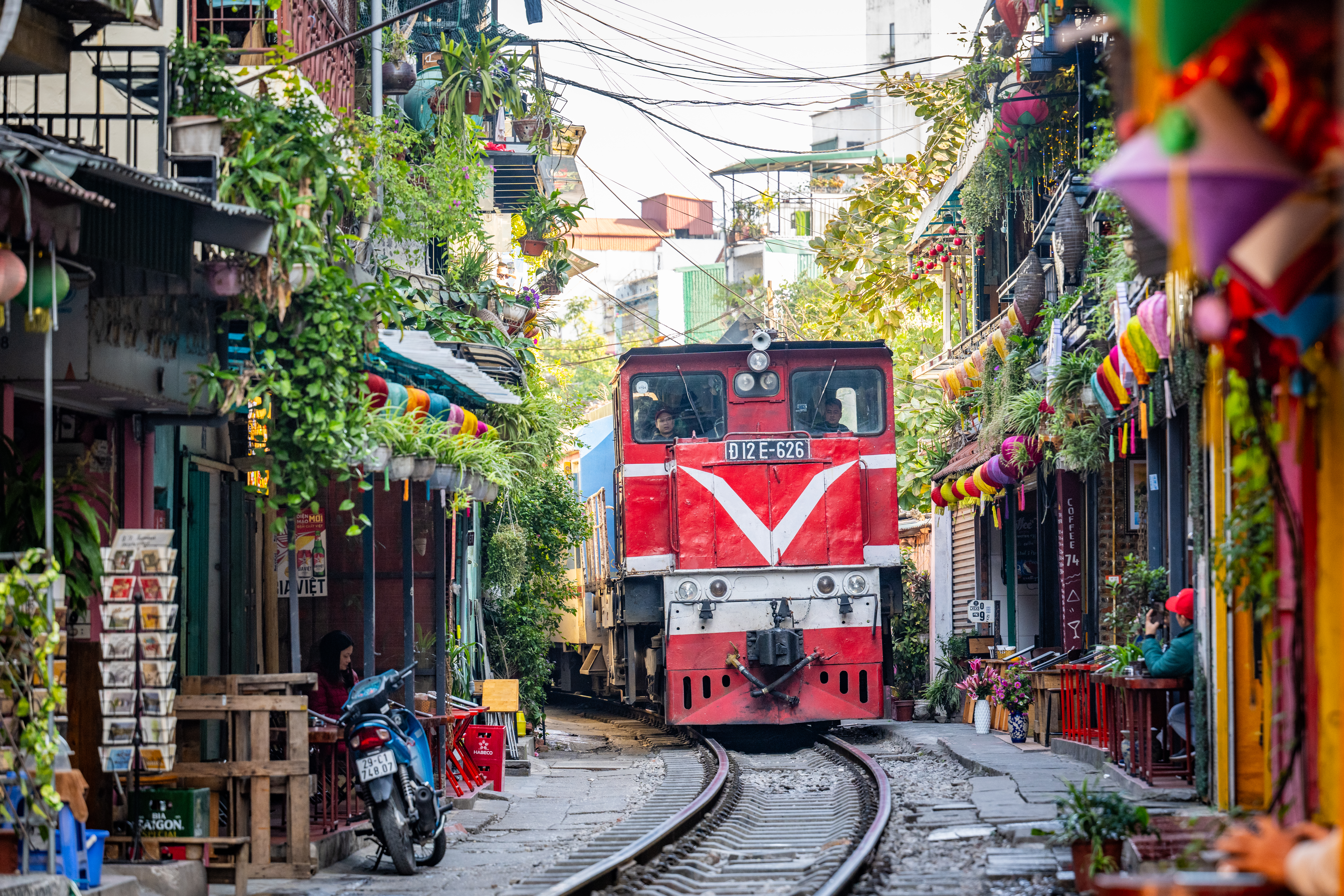
Hanoi Train Street, a tourist destination in Hanoi.

South of Hoàn Kiếm's "French Quarter" has French colonial landmarks, including the Hanoi Opera House, the Sofitel Legend Metropole Hanoi hotel, the National Museum of Vietnamese History (formerly the École française d'Extrême-Orient), and the St. Joseph's Cathedral. Most of the French-Colonial buildings in Hoan Kiem are later used as foreign embassies. Northwest of the historic center, the Vietnam Museum of Ethnology opened in 1997, and consists of two exhibition halls and an Architecture Garden. Since 2014, Hanoi has been voted in the world's top ten destinations by TripAdvisor. It ranked eighth in 2014, fourth in 2015 and eighth in 2016.

== Education ==
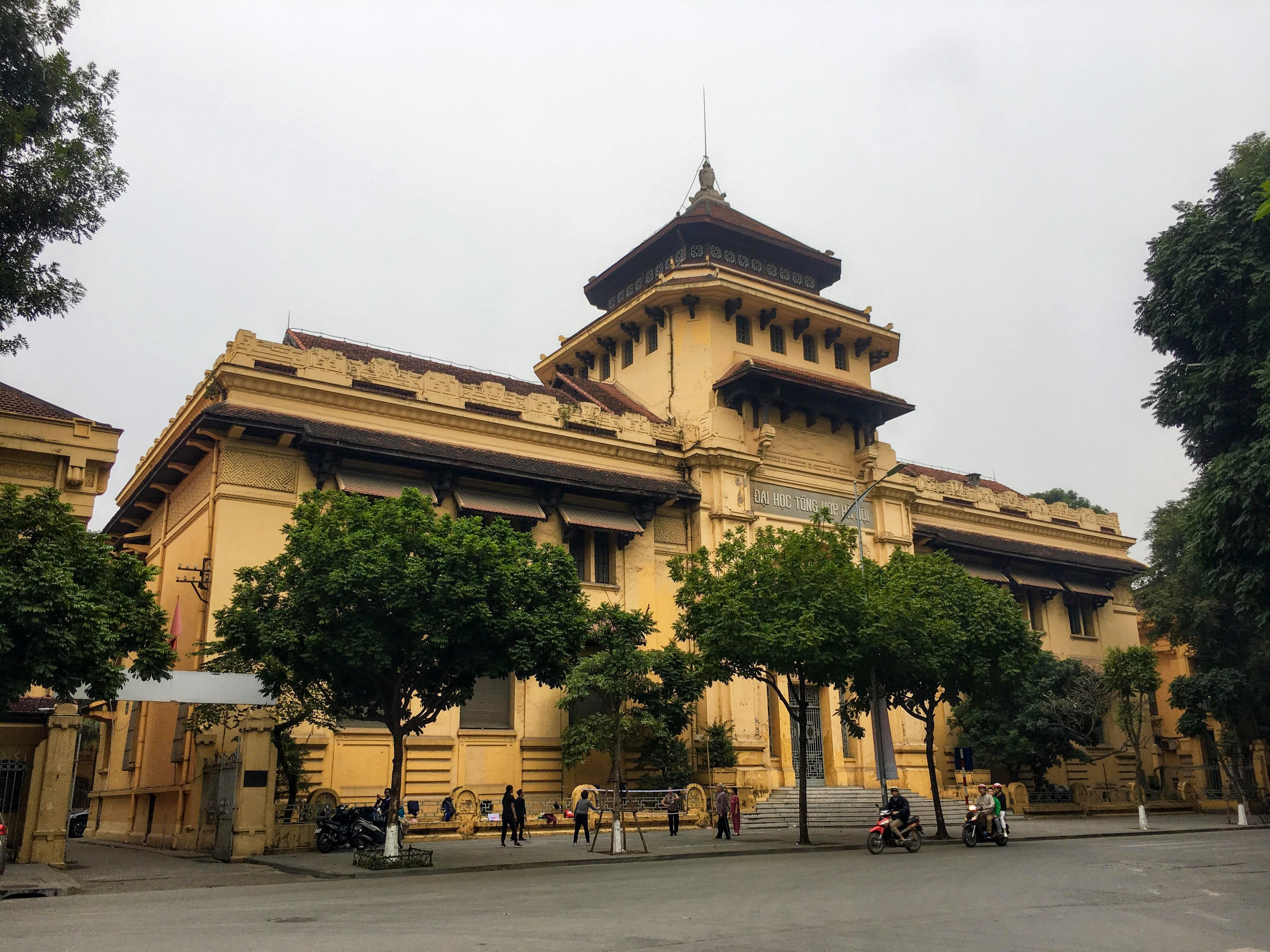
The Hanoi Medical University was established in 1902 during French colonial rule.

After the Communist Party of Vietnam took control of Hanoi in 1954, new universities were built, including the Hanoi University of Science and Technology. ULIS (University of Languages and International Studies) was rated as "one of the top universities in south-east Asia for languages and language studies at the undergraduate level". Other universities that are not part of Vietnam National University or Hanoi University include Hanoi School for Public Health, Hanoi School of Agriculture, Electric Power University and University of Transport and Communications. It is estimated that 62% of the scientists in Vietnam are living and working in Hanoi. The majority of universities in Hanoi are public, while in years a number of private universities have begun operation. Thăng Long University was founded in 1988 by Vietnamese mathematics professors in Hanoi and France.

Education levels are higher within the city of Hanoi in comparison to the suburban areas outside the city. About 33.8% of the labor force in the city has completed secondary school in contrast to 19.4% in the suburbs. 21% of the labor force in the city has completed tertiary education in contrast to 4.1% in the suburbs.

== Transportation ==
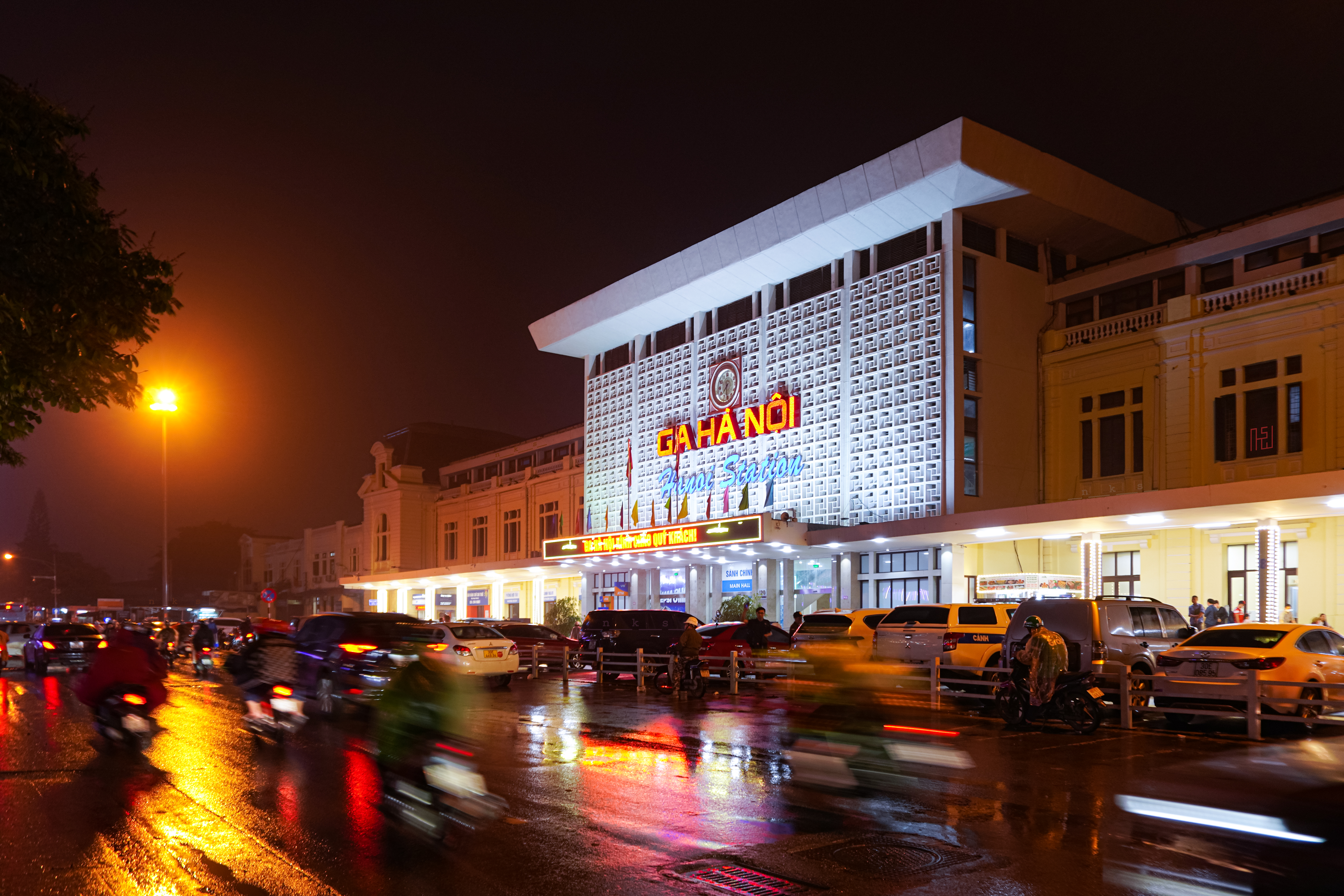
Hanoi railway station.

Hanoi has 1,370 streets and roads with the total length of over 2,300 km (1,429 mi); 573 bridges, of which 483 small to middle bridges, 13 light overpasses for vehicles, 70 pedestrian overpasses and seven main bridges (Chương Dương, Vĩnh Tuy, Thanh Trì, Nhật Tân, Đông Trù, Thăng Long, and Phùng); 115 tunnels, including nine main tunnels, 39 pedestrian tunnels and 67 underpass. In total, the proportion of land for traffic in the city as of 2021 is 10.3%. The city has 63 km (39 mi) of inland waterways, which include Yến stream, Hai stream, Cà Lồ and Đáy river.

Hanoi is the origin or departure point for Vietnam Railways train routes in the country with 6 national railway lines passing through the city with a total length of 162 km (101 mi). The Reunification Express (tàu Thống Nhất) runs from Hanoi to Ho Chi Minh City from Hanoi station (formerly Hang Co station), with stops at cities and provinces along the line. Trains depart Hanoi for Hai Phong and other northern cities. The Reunification Express line was established during the French colonial rule and was completed over a period from 1899 to 1936. The Reunification Express between Hanoi and Ho Chi Minh City covers a distance of 1,726 km (1,072 mi) and takes approximately 33 hours.

In decades, motorbikes have overtaken bicycles as the main form of transportation. The increasing number of cars is the main cause of gridlocks, as roads and infrastructure in older parts of Hanoi were not designed to accommodate them. On 4 July 2017, the Hanoi government voted to ban motorbikes entirely by 2030 to reduce pollution, congestion, and encourage the expansion and use of public transport. The number of vehicles registered in Hanoi as of July 2022 is over 7.6 million, including more than 1 million cars, over 6.4 million motorcycles of and 179,000 electric motorbikes. This figure does not include vehicles of the armed forces, diplomatic missions and other localities' vehicles operating in Hanoi.

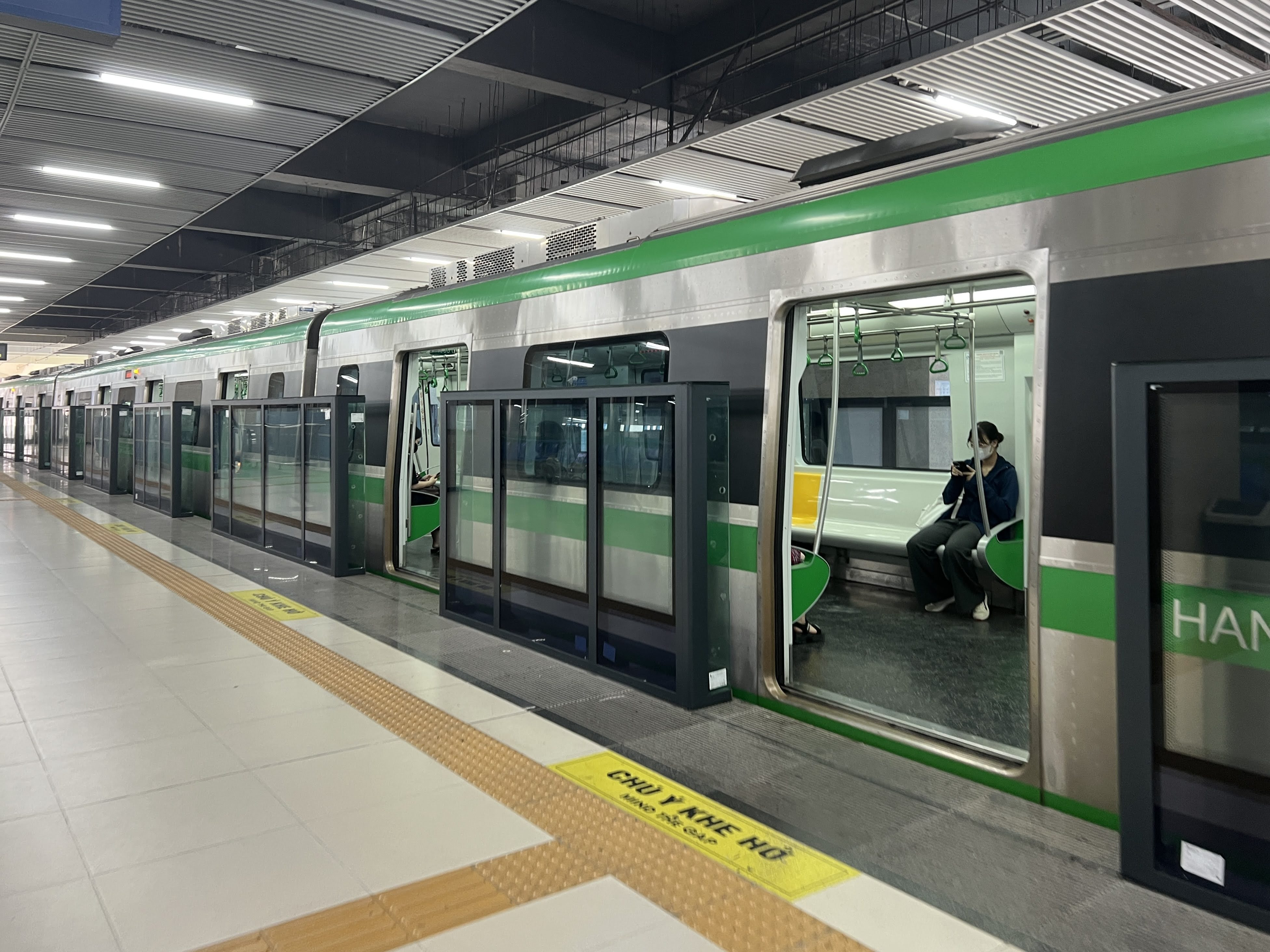
Cat Linh station with train.

People on their own or traveling in a pair who wish to make a fast trip around Hanoi to avoid traffic jams or to travel at an irregular time or by way of an irregular route may use "xe ôm" (literally, "hug bike"). Motorbikes can be rented from agents within the Old Quarter of Hanoi.

There are two metro lines in Hanoi, as part of the master plan for the future Hanoi Metro system. Line 2A opened on 6 November 2021, while Line 3 began operations on 8 August 2024.

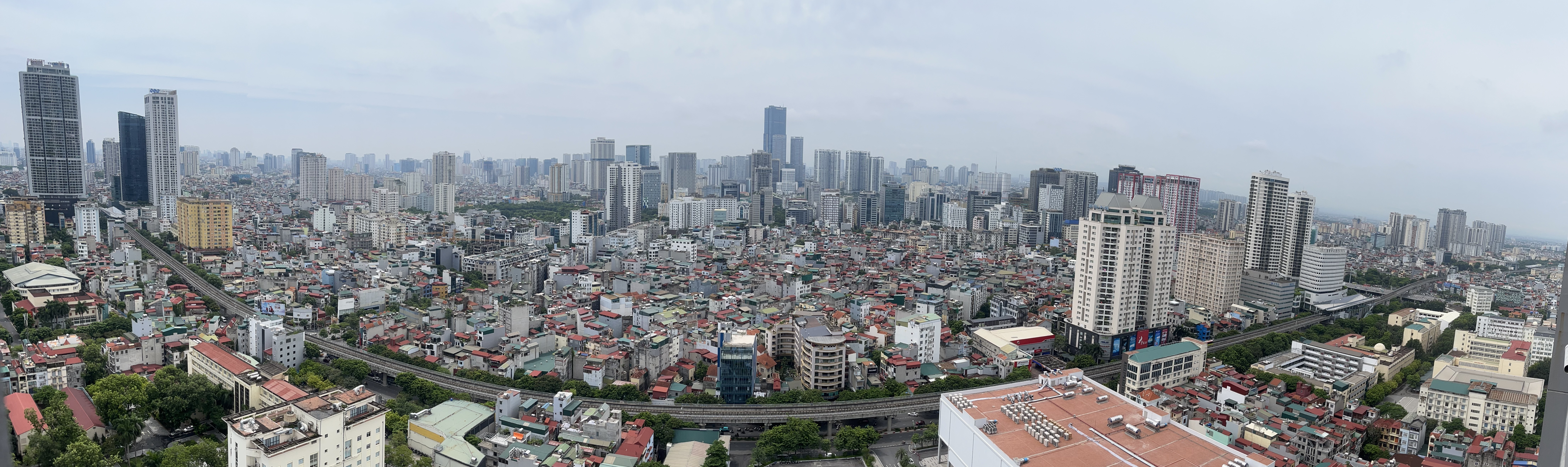
Elevated section of Hanoi Metro Line 3 passing over Xuan Thuy road in 2024.

== Sports ==
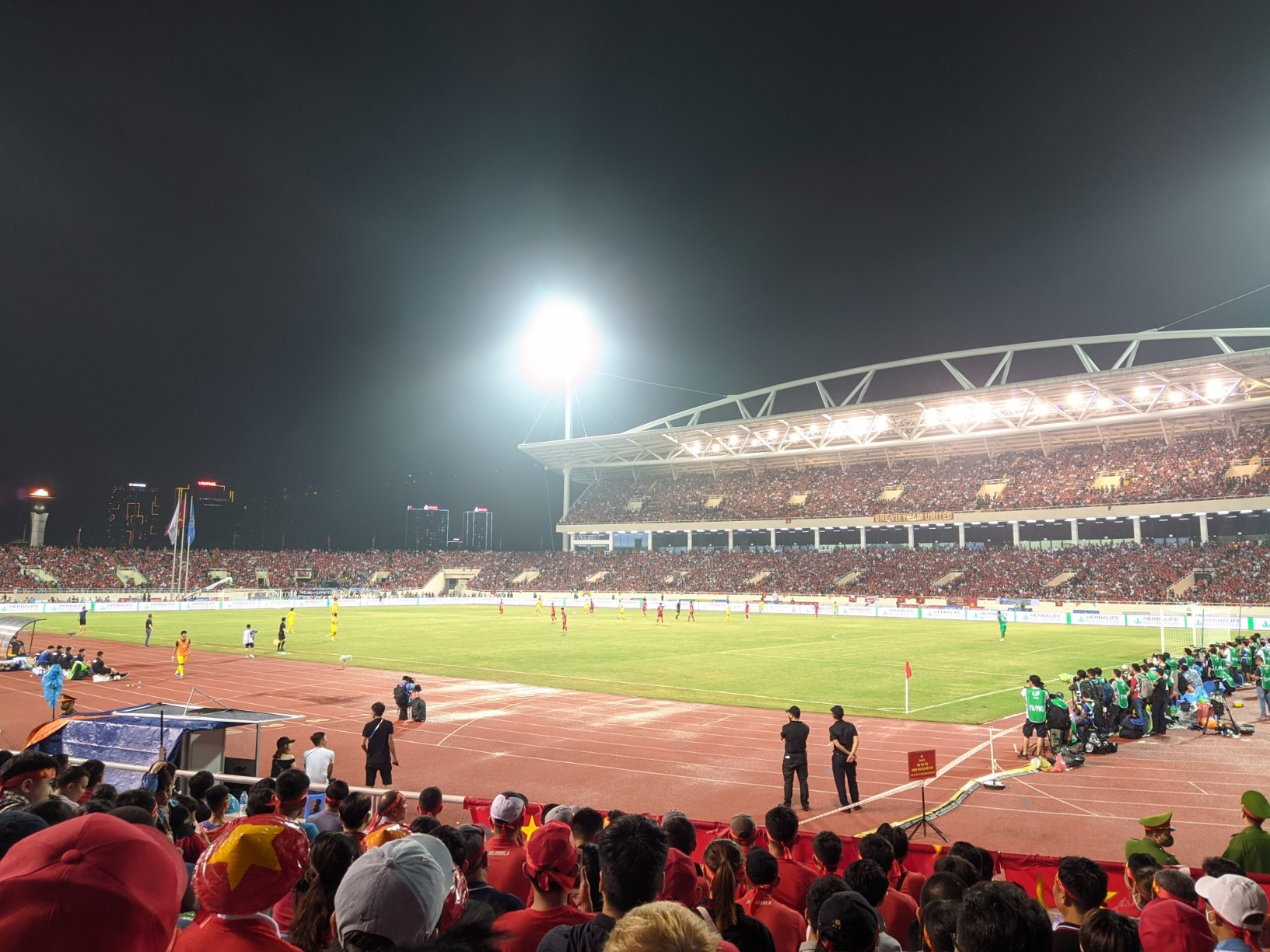
Mỹ Đình National Stadium.

There are gymnasiums and stadiums throughout the city of Hanoi, including Mỹ Đình National Stadium (Lê Đức Thọ Boulevard), Quần Ngựa Sports Palace (Văn Cao Avenue), Hanoi Aquatics Sports Complex, Hanoi Indoor Games Gymnasium, Hàng Đẫy Stadium, Hà Đông Stadium and Thanh Trì Stadium. The third Asian Indoor Games were held in Hanoi in 2009. The others are Hai Bà Trưng Gymnasium, Trịnh Hoài Đức Gymnasium, Vạn Bảo Sports Complex. Some of these venues held events at the 2003 and 2021 SEA Games, both hosted in Hanoi.

On 6 November 2018, it was announced that in 2020, Hanoi would become the host of the first FIA Formula 1 Vietnamese Grand Prix on a street circuit on the outskirts of the city. The race was initially postponed and later cancelled due to the COVID-19 pandemic and the inaugural edition of the event postponed to 2021. The Grand Prix was removed from the 2021 calendar because of the arrest of Hanoi People's Committee chairman Nguyễn Đức Chung on corruption charges unrelated to the Grand Prix. As a result, the race was permanently cancelled.

== UNESCO recognition ==
On 16 July 1999, the United Nations Educational, Scientific and Cultural Organization (UNESCO) presented the title "City for Peace" to Hanoi because the city met the following criteria: exemplary action against exclusion and in support of the dialogue between communities, exemplary urban action, exemplary environmental action, exemplary action to promote culture, exemplary action in the field of education and especially civic education.

== Twin towns – sister cities ==
Hanoi is twinned with:

- Phnom Penh, Cambodia
- Jakarta, Indonesia
- Fukuoka Prefecture, Japan
- Astana, Kazakhstan
- Seoul, South Korea
- Warsaw, Poland
- Moscow, Russia
- Victoria, Seychelles
- Bangkok, Thailand
- Beijing, China
- Hangzhou, China
- Ankara, Turkey
- Minsk, Belarus
- Palermo, Italy
- Pretoria, South Africa

== Gallery ==
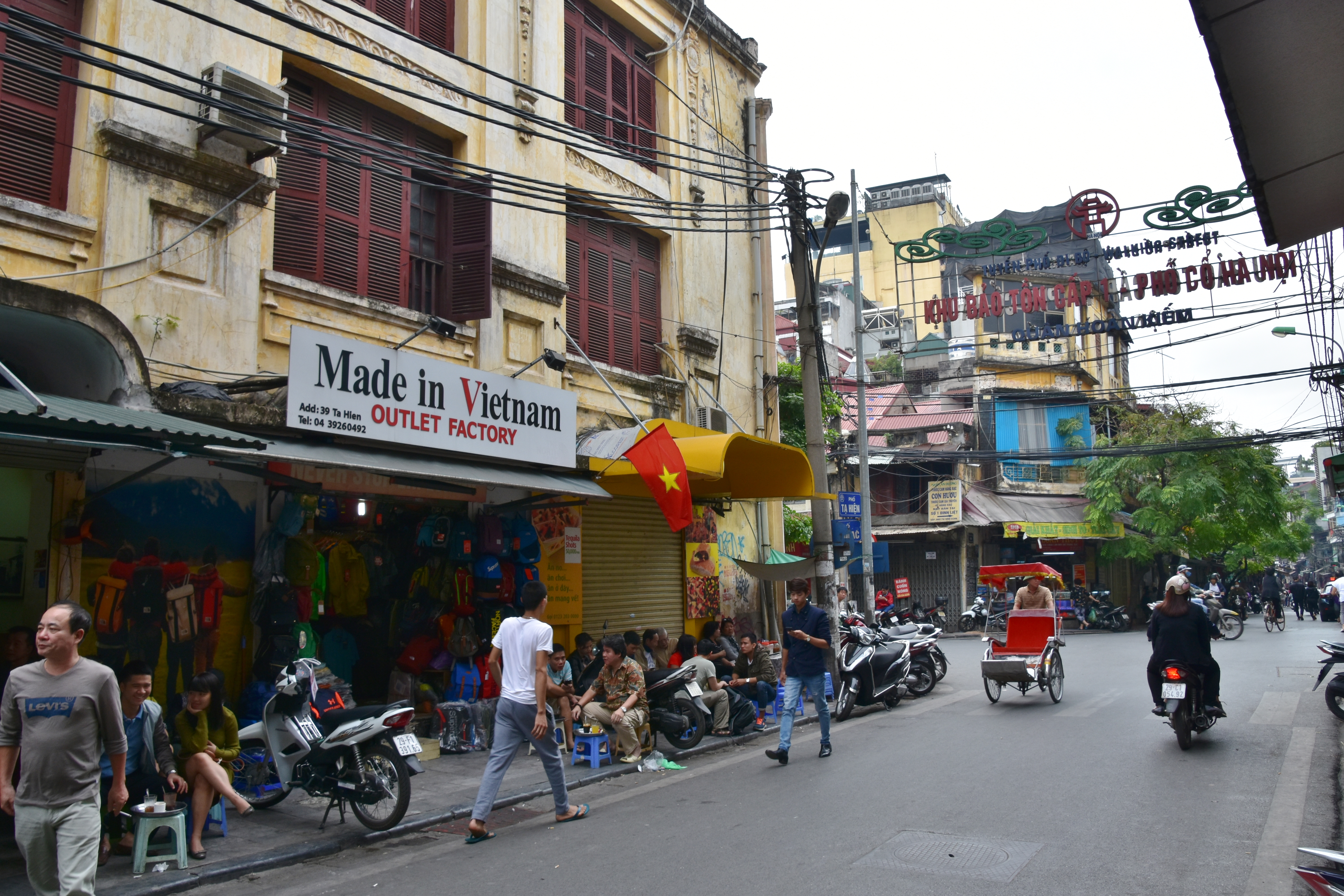
Life on the streets of the Old Quarter.

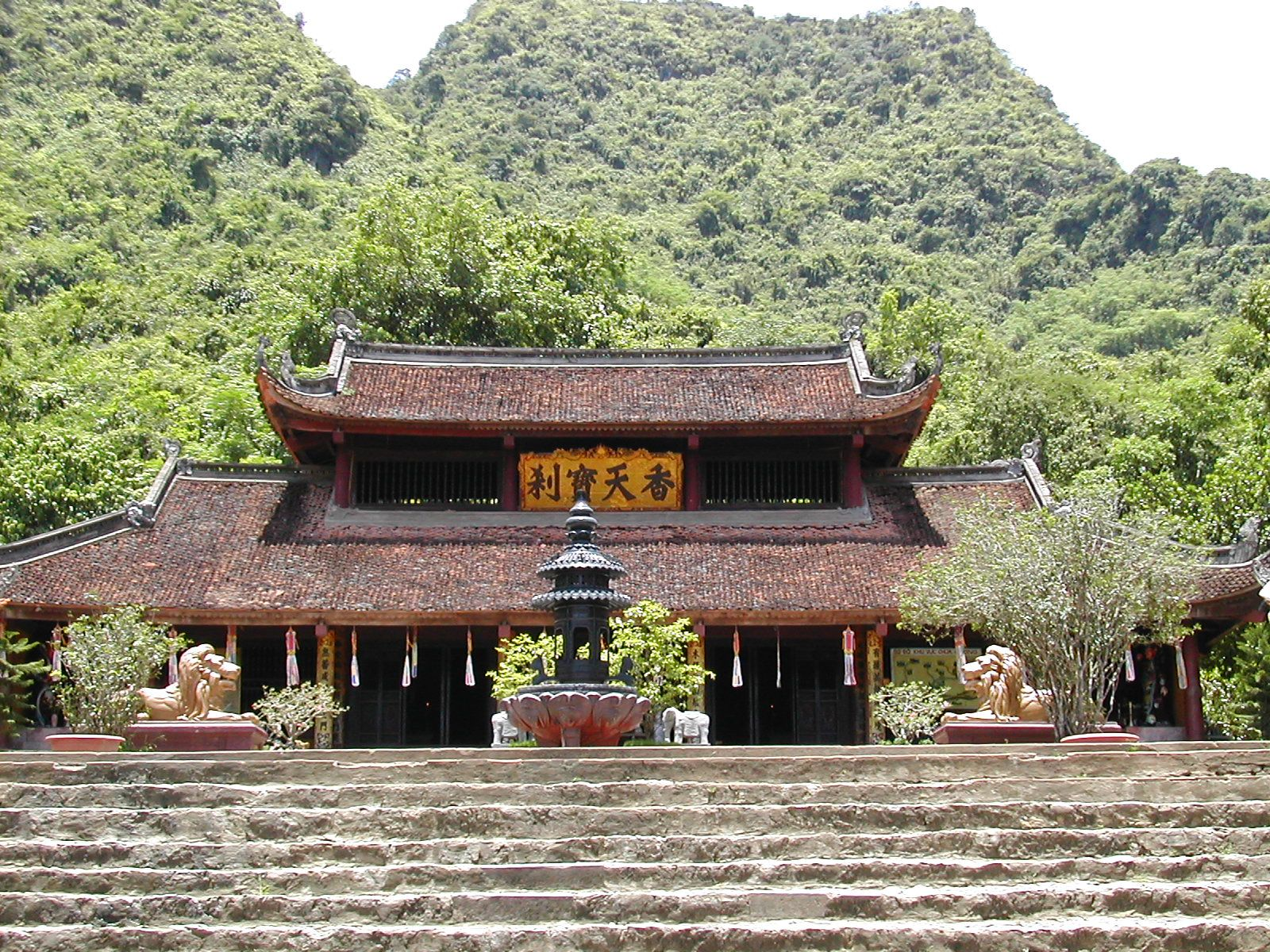
Thiên Trù Pagoda in the Perfume Pagoda complex.

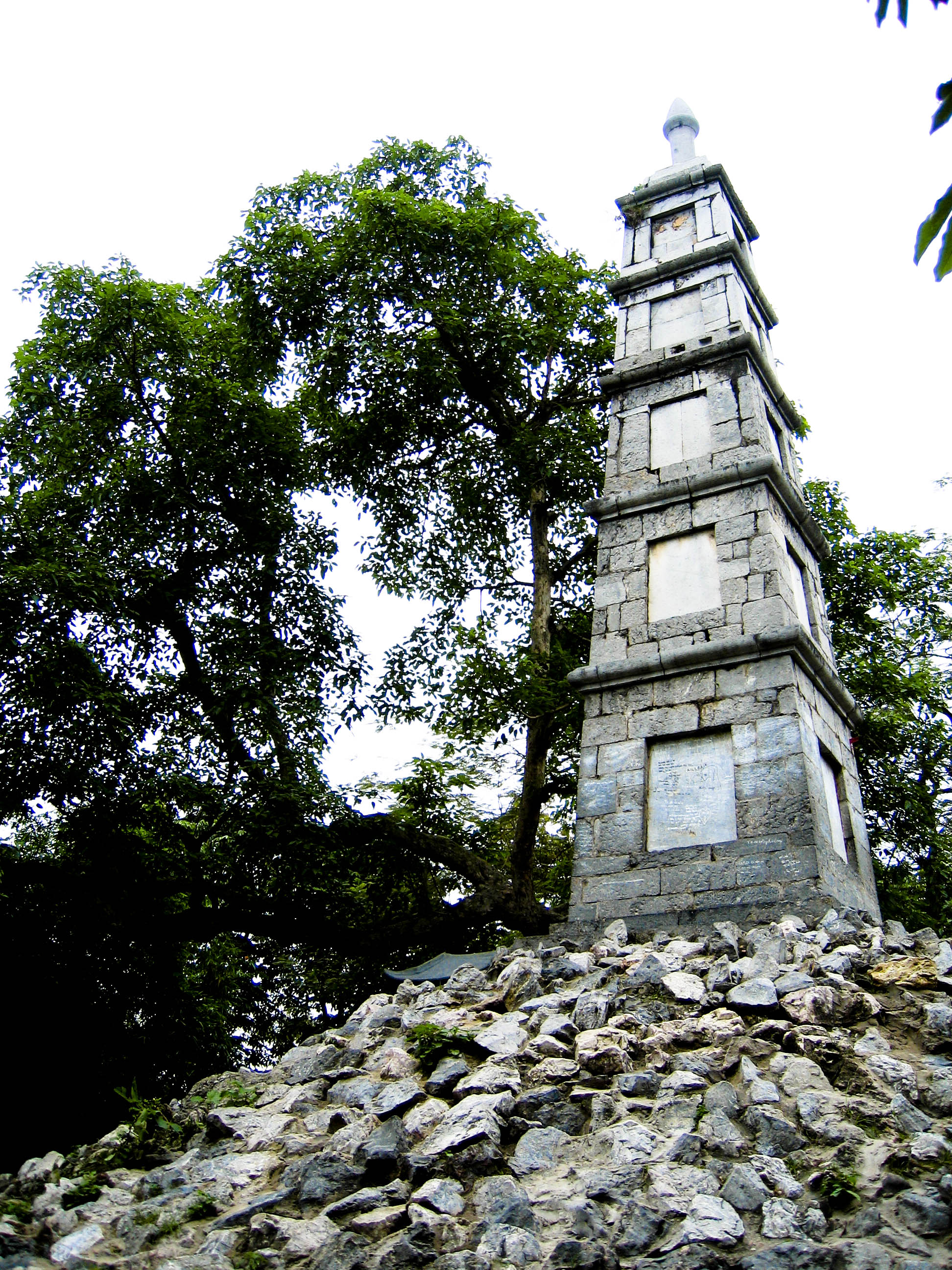
Tháp Bút (Pen Tower) with a phrase "Tả thanh thiên" (meaning "Write on the sky") next to Hoàn Kiếm Lake (2007).

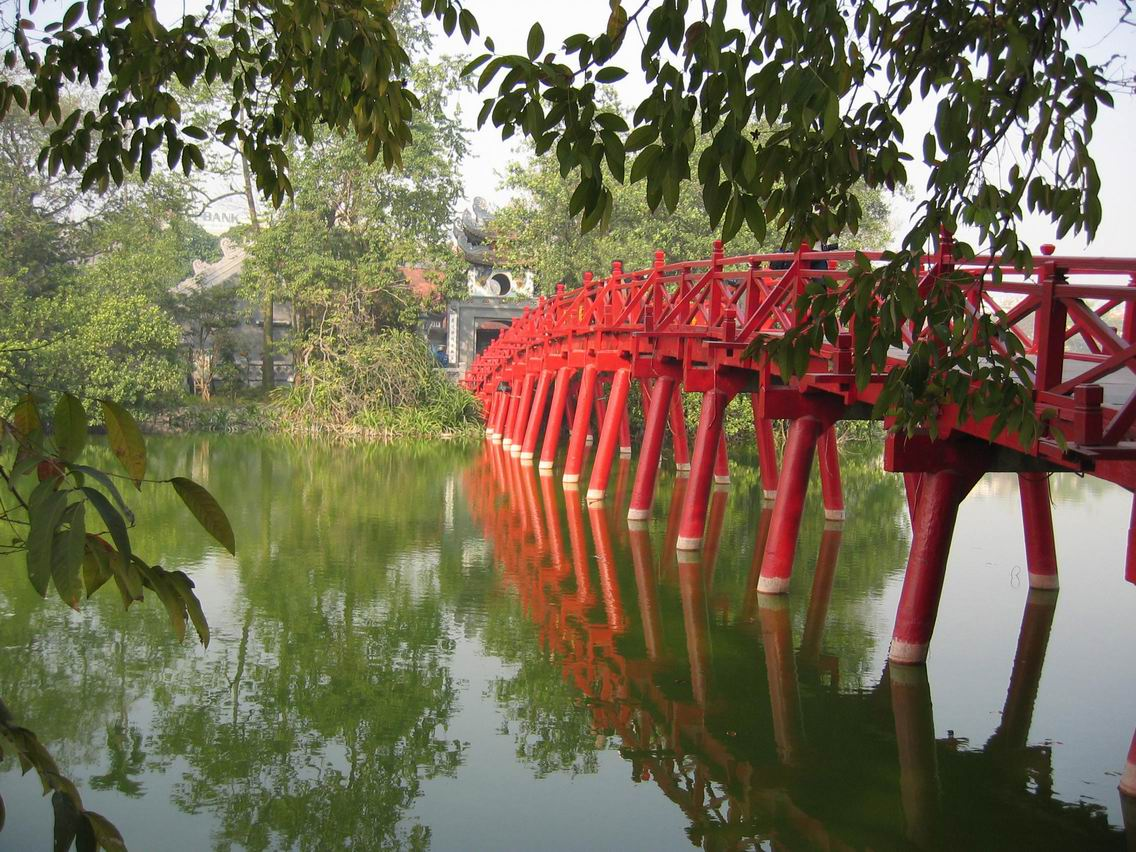
Thê Húc Bridge on Hoàn Kiếm Lake.

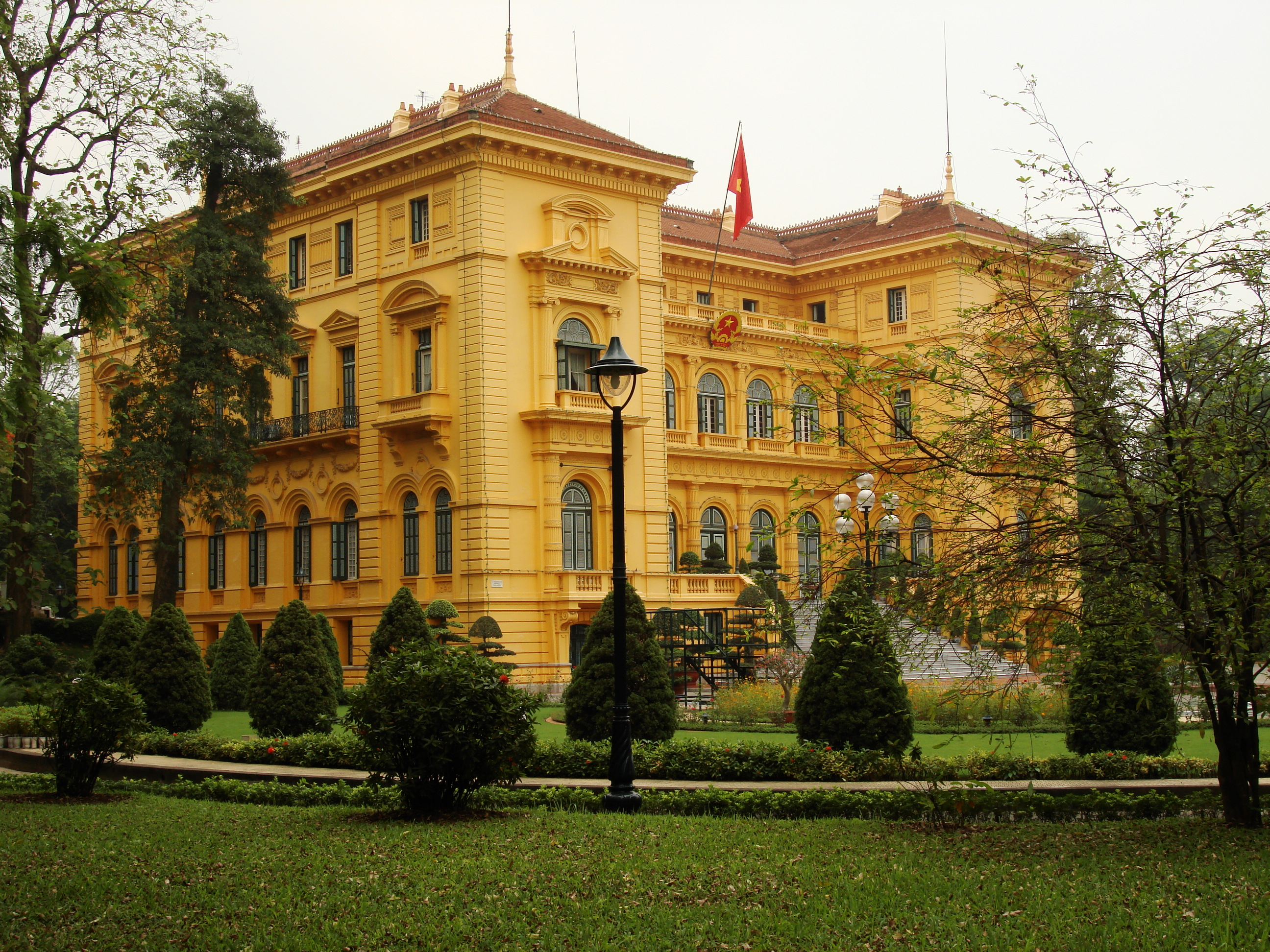
Presidential Palace, Hanoi (formerly Palace of The Governor-General of French Indochina).

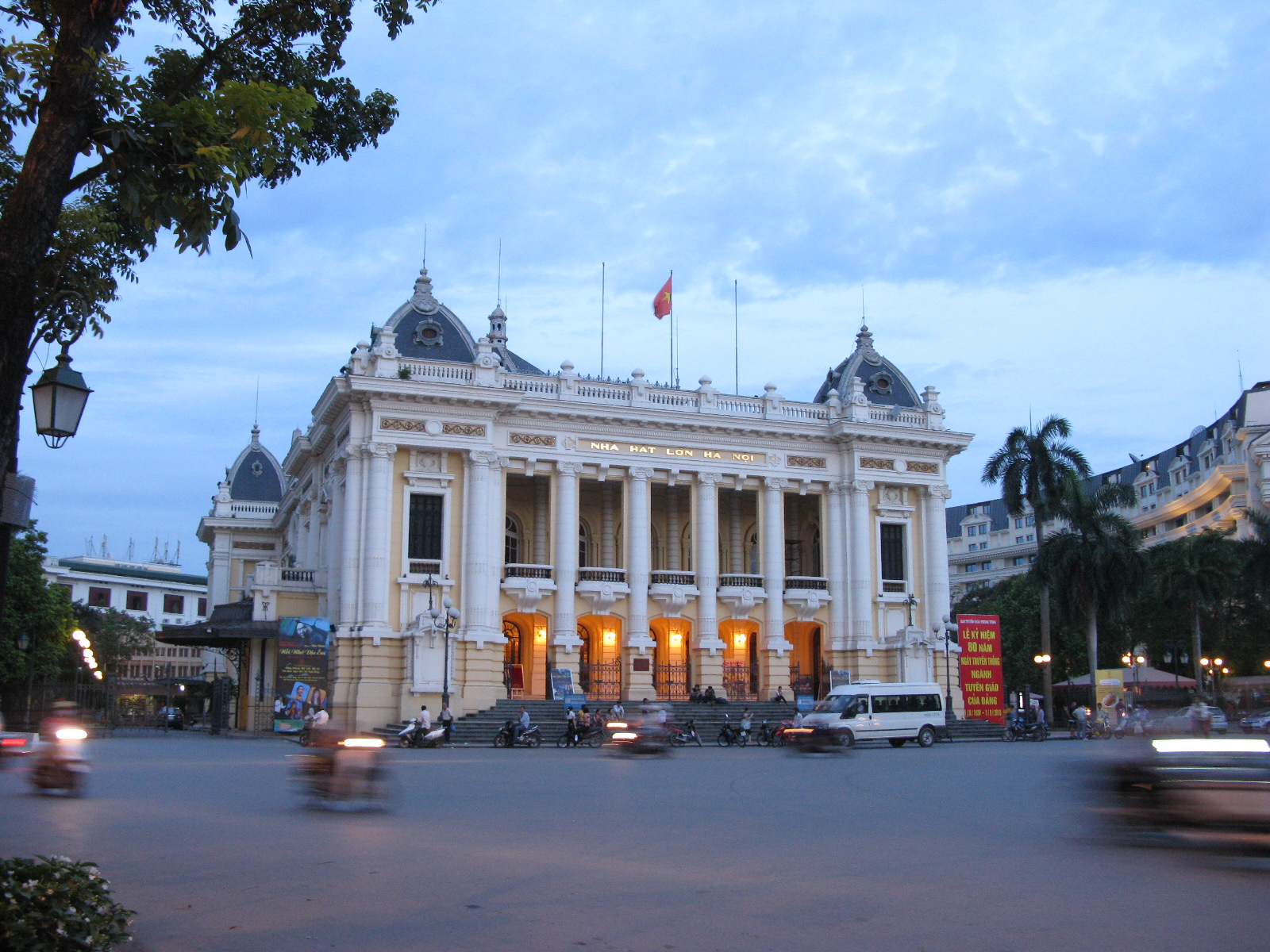
Hanoi Opera House, modelled on the Palais Garnier in Paris.

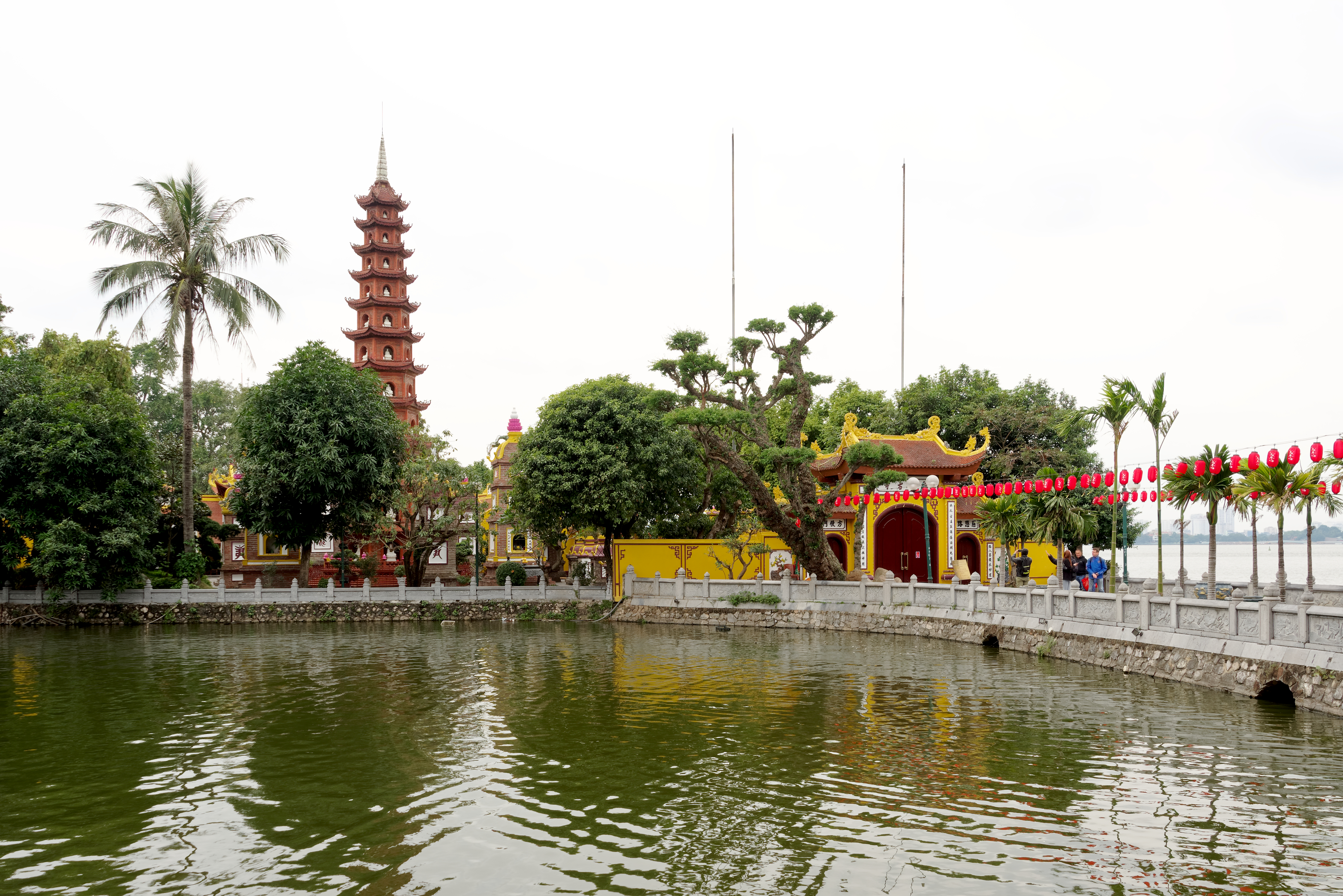
Trấn Quốc Pagoda.

Museum of Vietnamese History in Hanoi, formerly the first École française d'Extrême-Orient.

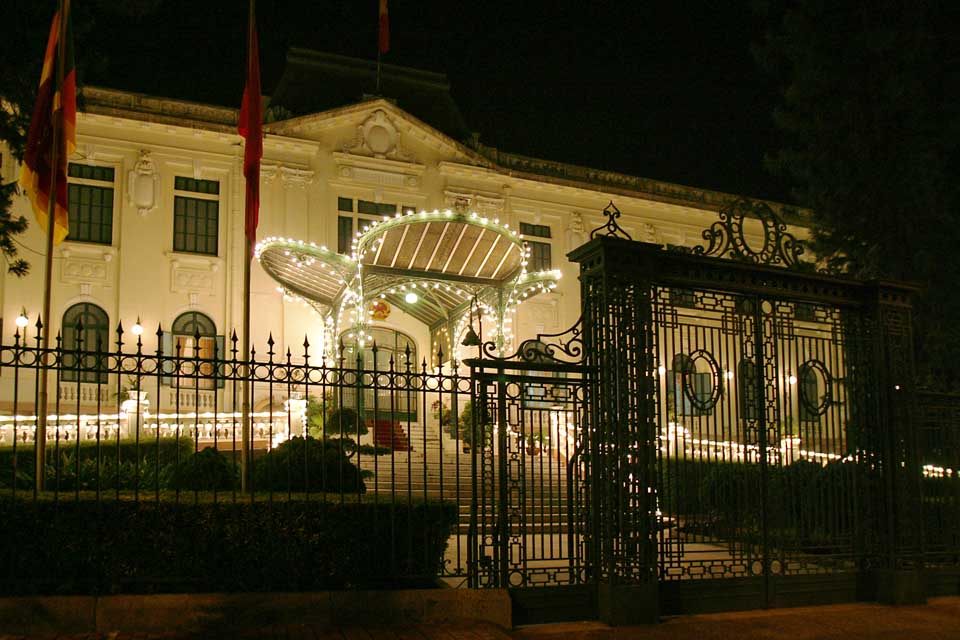
Tonkin Palace serves as State Guest House.

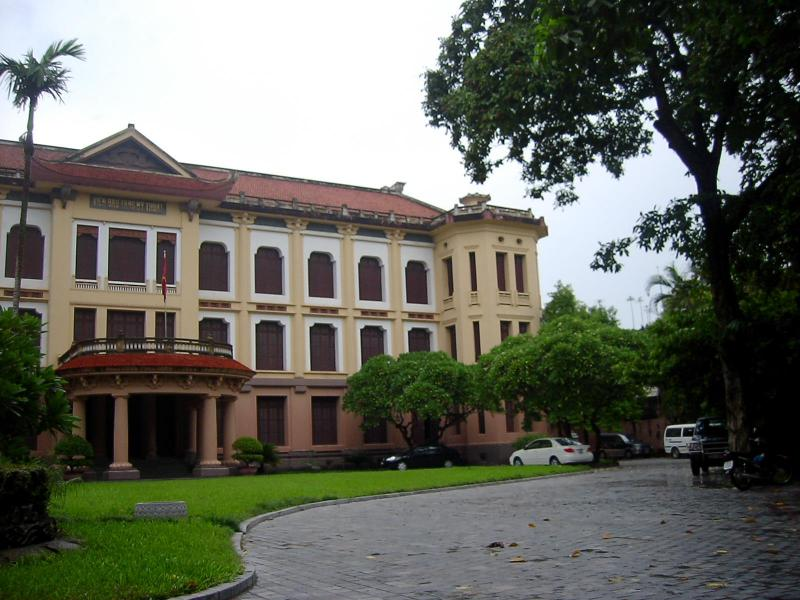
Vietnam National Museum of Fine Arts.

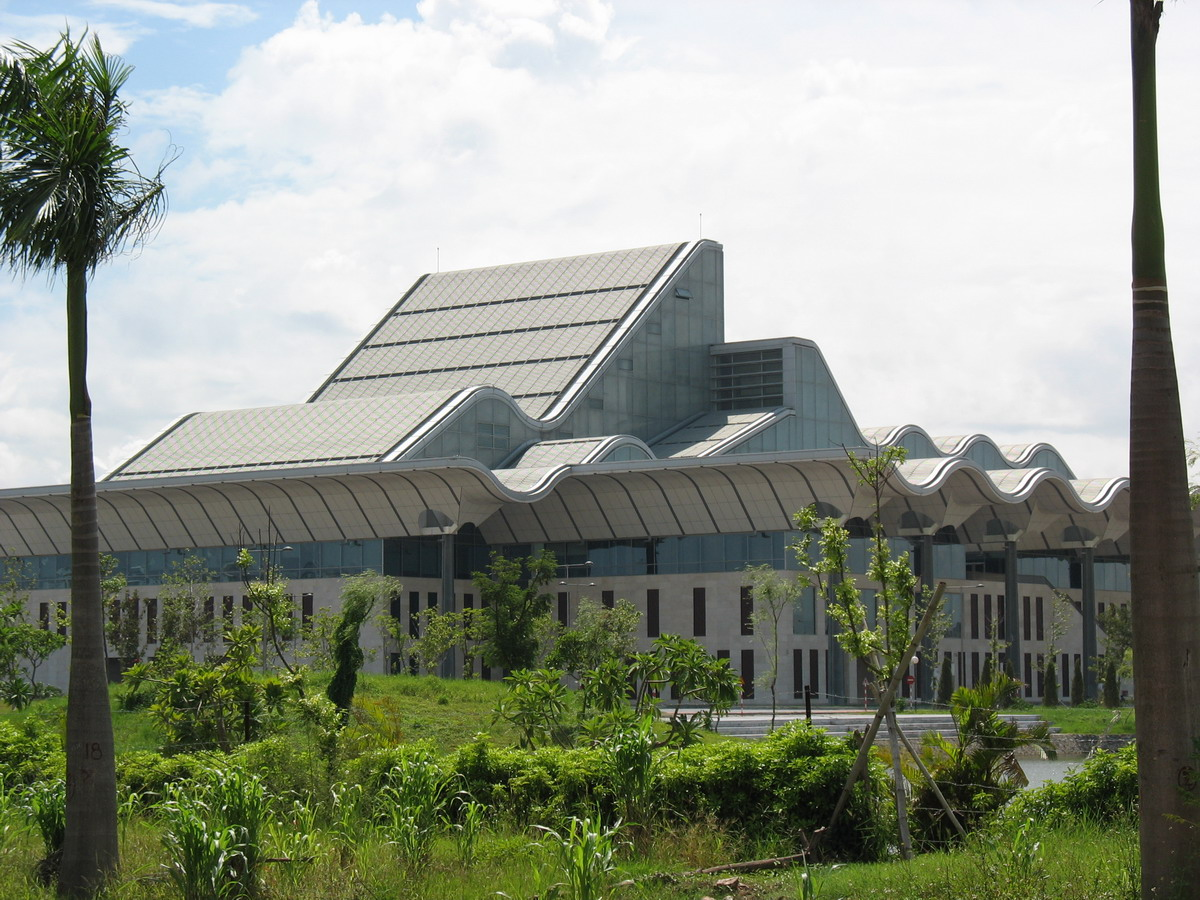
Vietnam National Convention Center.

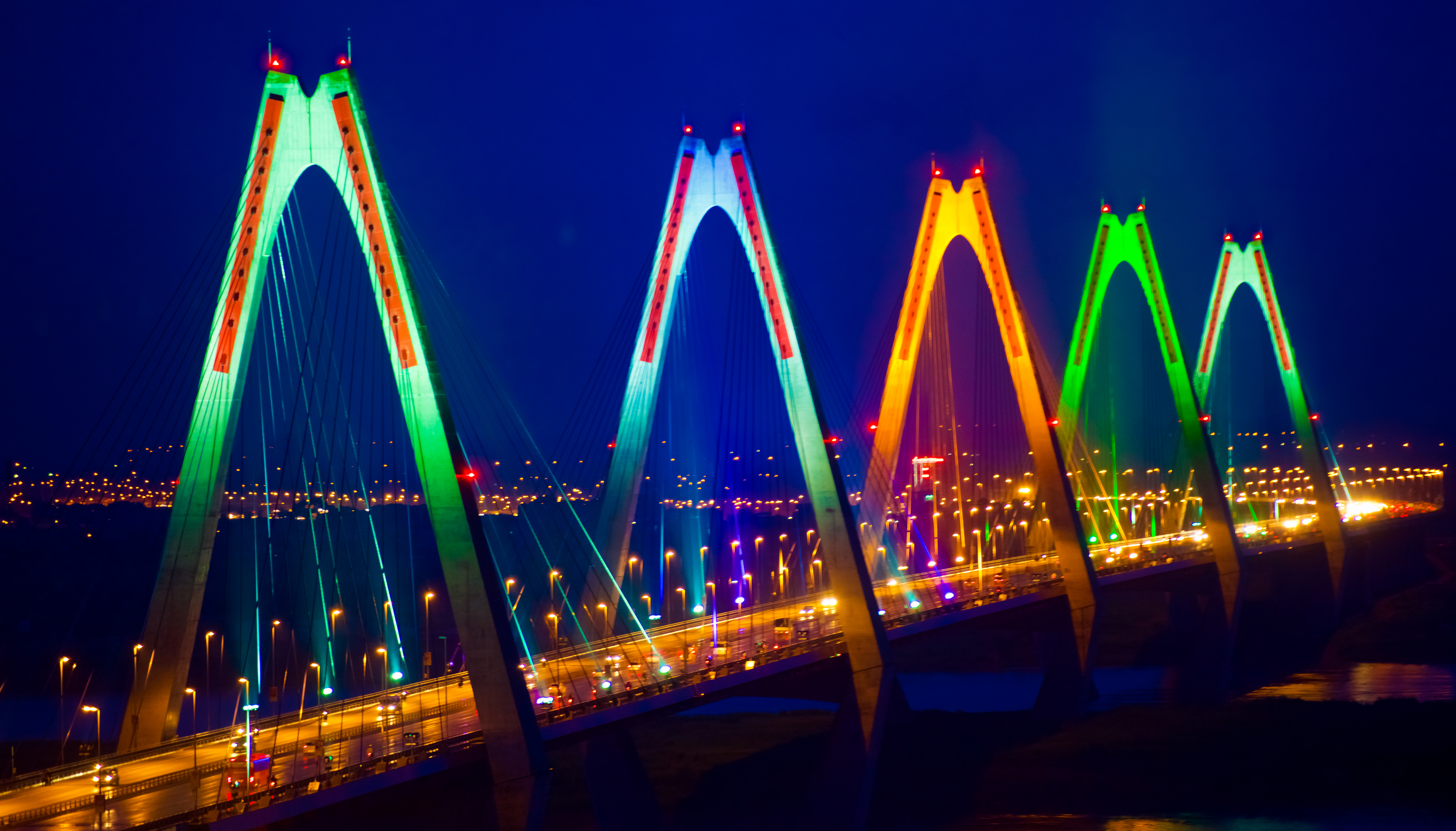
Nhật Tân Bridge.

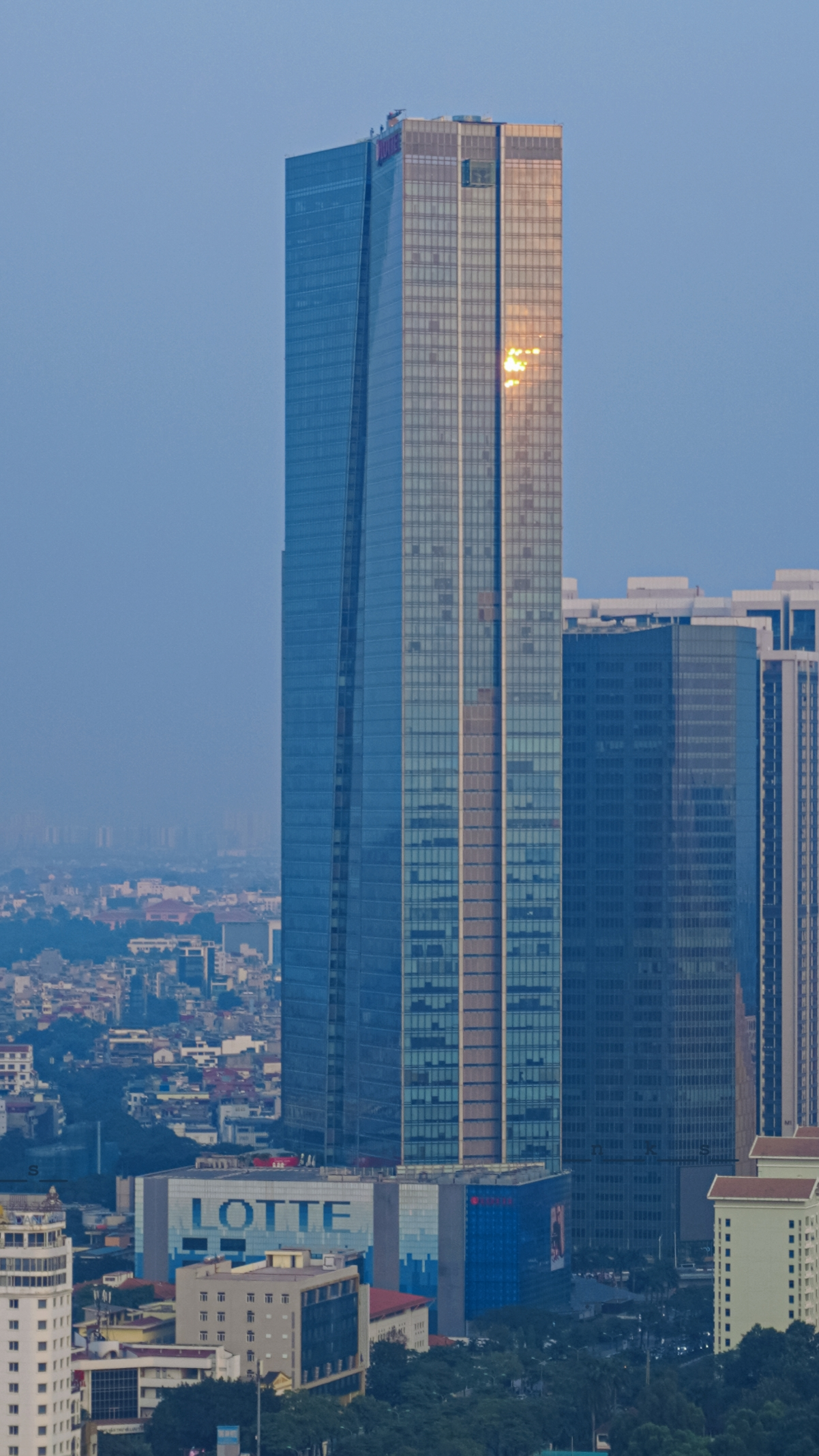
Lotte Center Hanoi in western Ba Đình.

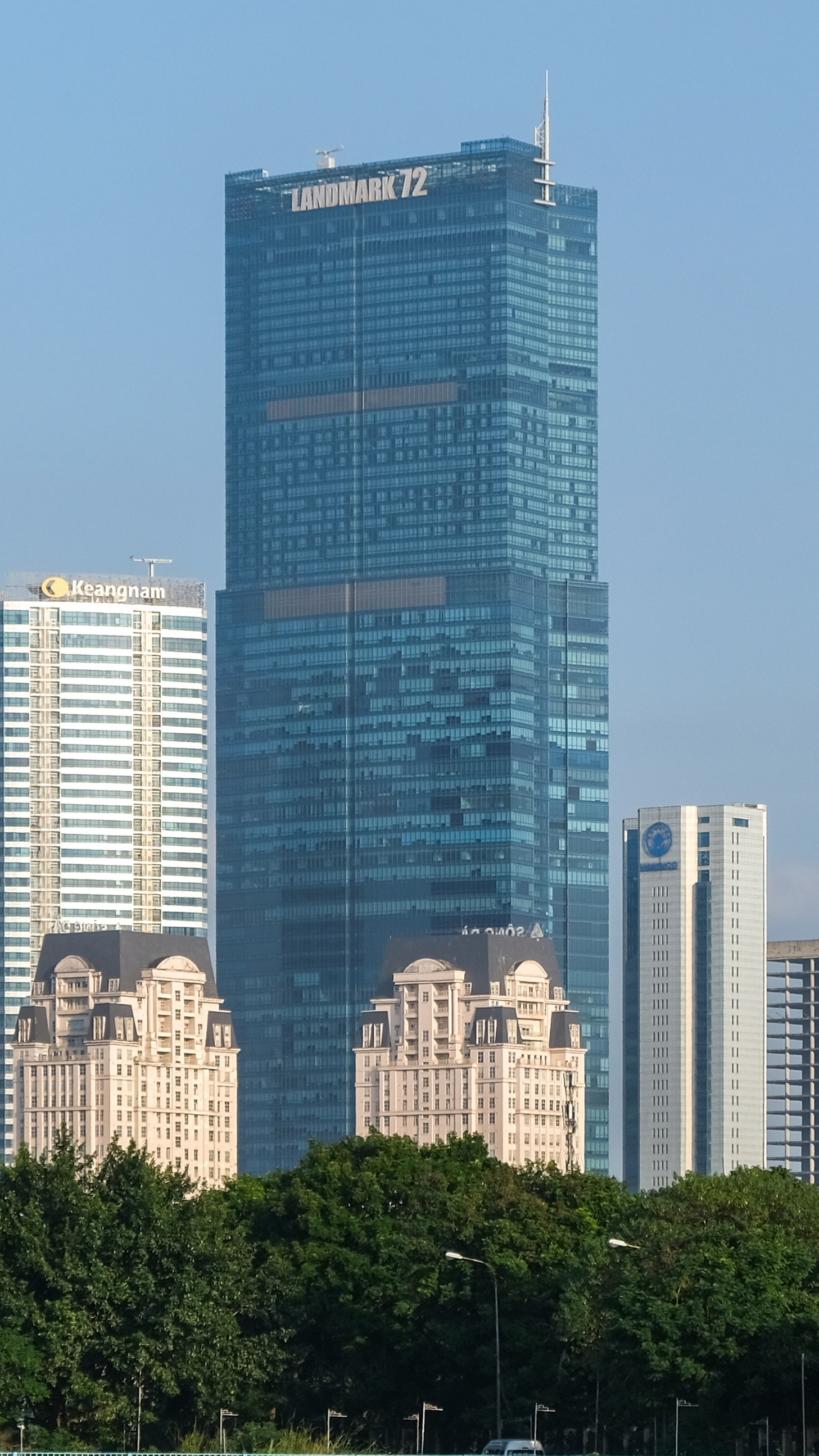
AON Landmark 72 in Nam Từ Liêm.

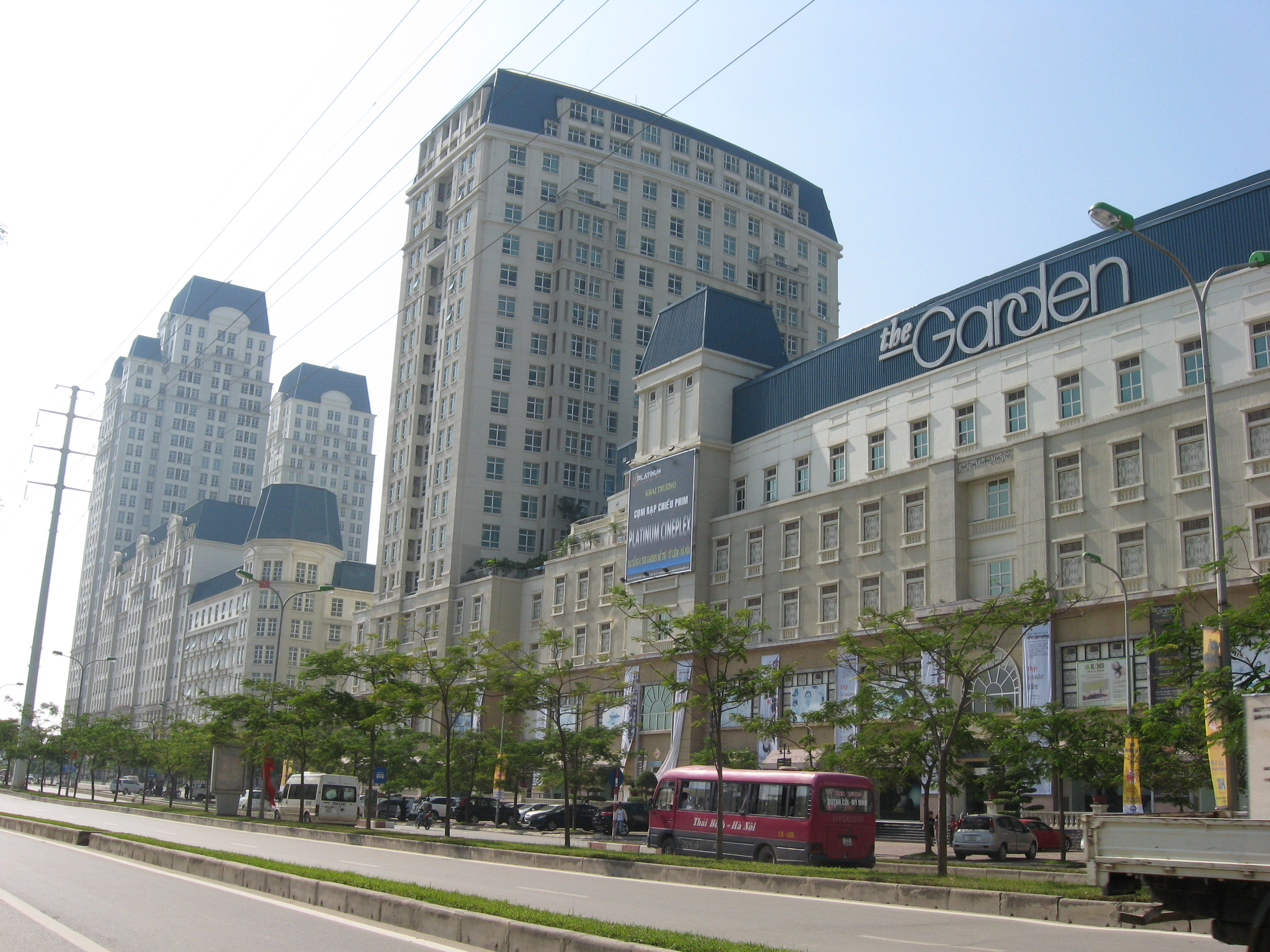
Inspiration of French Colonial architecture in Hanoi's buildings.
