= Ho Chi Minh Mausoleum =

National mausoleum in Hanoi, Vietnam

Coordinates: 21°2′12″N 105°50′5″E

President Ho Chi Minh Mausoleum
- Lăng Chủ tịch Hồ Chí Minh (Vietnamese)
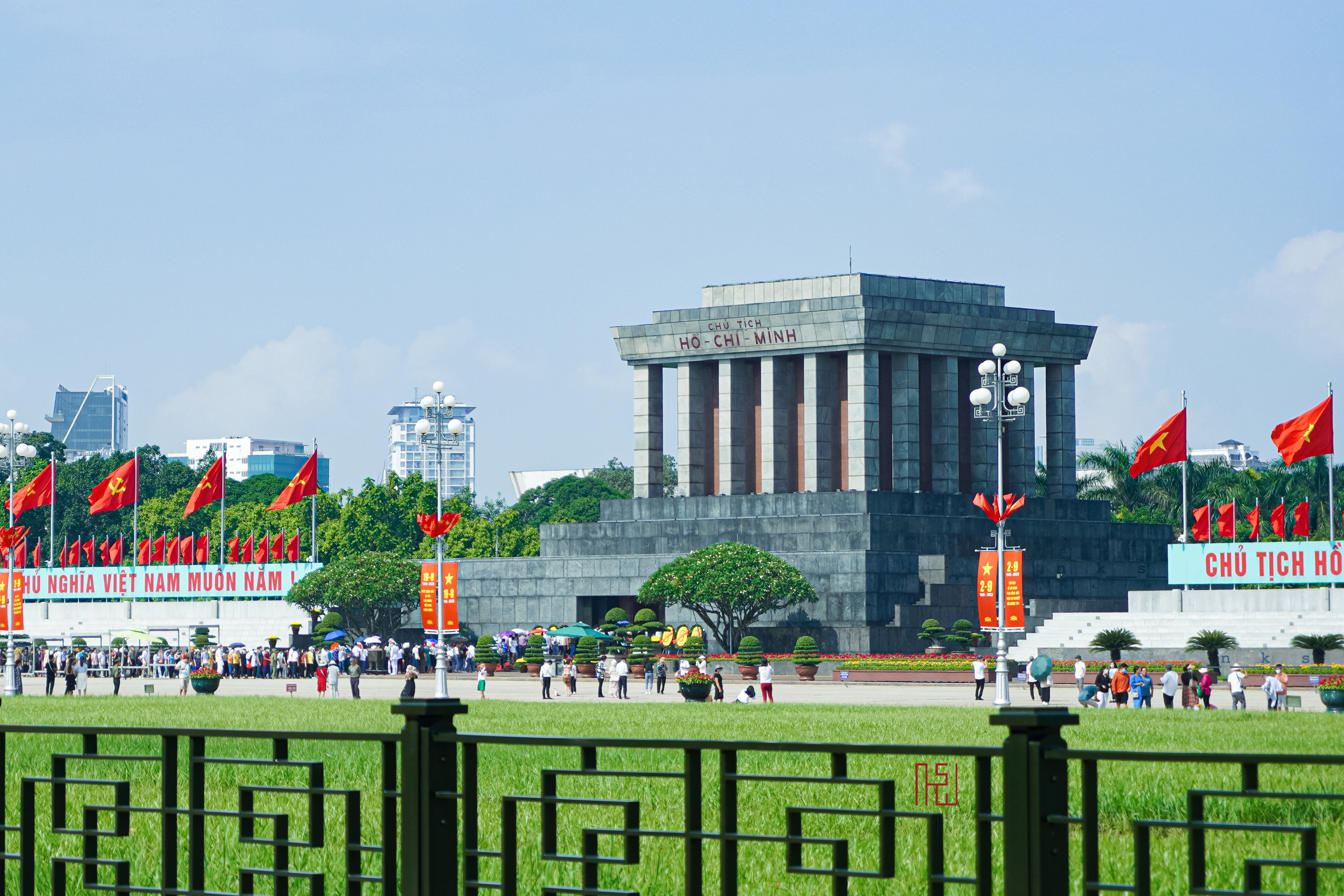
- Interactive map of President Ho Chi Minh Mausoleum
- Location: Ba Đình district, Hanoi, Vietnam

History
- Built: 1973–1975; 51 years ago
- Built for: Ho Chi Minh

Site notes
- Height: 21.6 m (70 ft 10 in)
- Area: 12.000 m^{2} (129.17 sq ft)
- Architect: Garol Isakovich
- Architectural style: Stripped Classicism

The President Ho Chi Minh Mausoleum (Vietnamese: Lăng Chủ tịch Hồ Chí Minh, Lăng Bác) is a mausoleum which serves as the resting place of Vietnamese revolutionary leader and President Ho Chi Minh in Hanoi, Vietnam. It is a large building located in the center of Ba Đình Square, where Ho, Chairman of the Workers' Party of Vietnam from 1951 until his death in 1969, read the Declaration of Independence on September 2, 1945, establishing the Democratic Republic of Vietnam. It is open to the public every morning except Monday and Friday.

== Building ==
Construction work began on September 2, 1973, and the mausoleum was formally inaugurated on August 29, 1975. It was inspired by Lenin's Mausoleum in Moscow but incorporates distinct Vietnamese architectural elements, such as the sloping roof. The exterior is made of grey granite, while the interior is grey, black and red polished stone. The mausoleum's portico has the words "Chủ tịch Hồ-Chí-Minh" (President Ho Chi Minh) inscribed across it. The banner beside says "Nước Cộng Hòa Xã Hội Chủ Nghĩa Việt Nam Muôn Năm" (lit. 'Long live The Socialist Republic of Vietnam').

The structure is 21.6 metres (70 ft 10 in) high and 41.2 m (135 ft 2 in) wide. Flanking the mausoleum are two platforms with seven steps for parade viewing. The plaza in front of the mausoleum is divided into two hundred forty green squares separated by pathways. The gardens surrounding the mausoleum have nearly 250 different species of plants and flowers, all from different regions of Vietnam. Also during parades, the tribune is used as a viewing stage for leaders to watch from similar to the tribune of Lenin's Mausoleum.

The embalmed body of President Ho Chi Minh is preserved in the cooler, central hall of the mausoleum, which is protected by a military honour guard. The body lies in a glass case with dim lights. The mausoleum is generally open to the public.

== Description ==
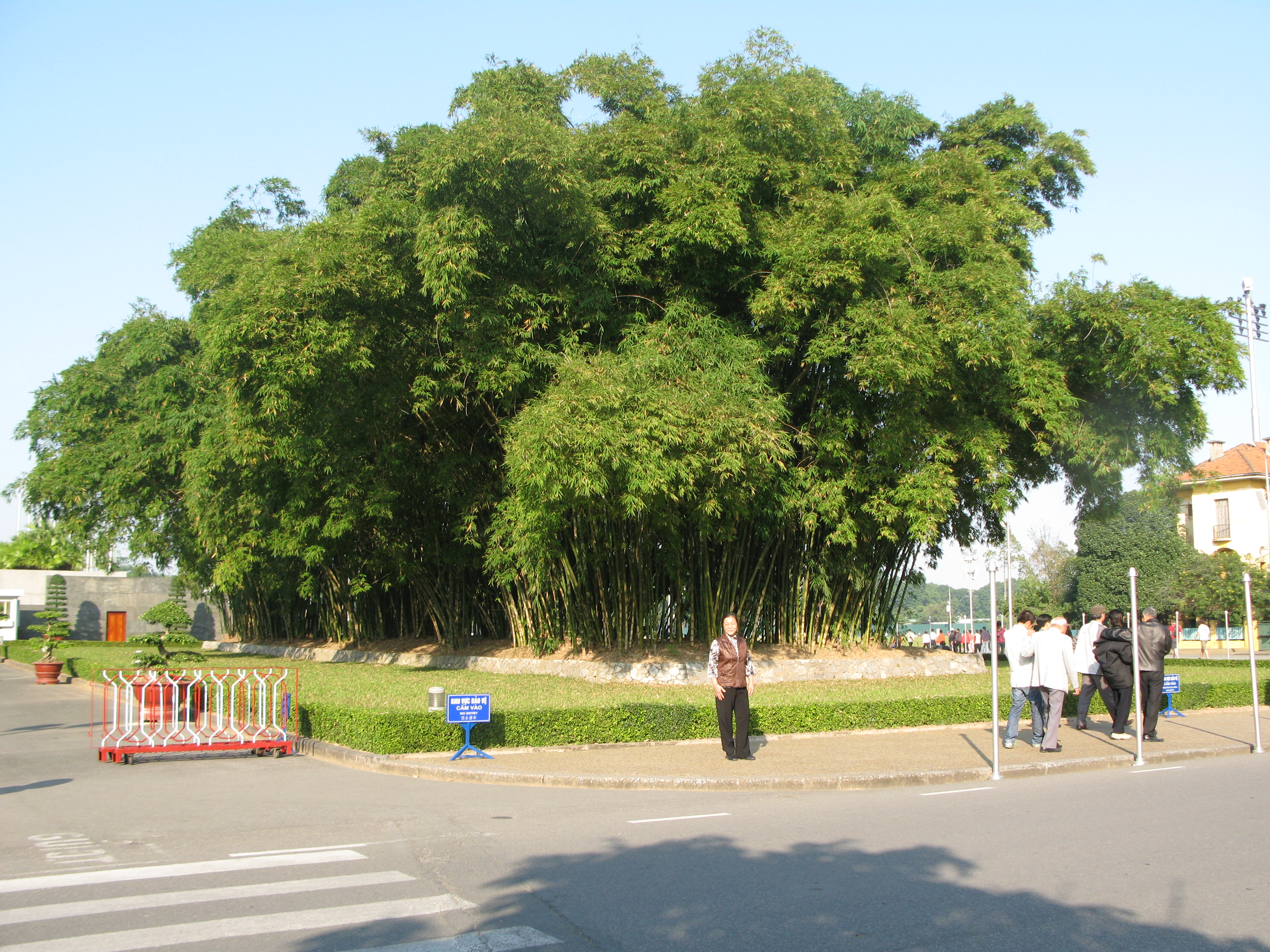
Bamboo near the Ho Chi Minh Mausoleum

At the top of the mausoleum is the inscription "President Ho Chi Minh" in dark red jade stone from Cao Bằng. The mausoleum's door is made from precious wood from the Central Highlands. The front hall is adorned with pink-veined marble, providing a backdrop for the inscription "Nothing is more precious than Independence and Freedom" and Ho Chi Minh's signature inlaid in gold. The 200 doors within the mausoleum are crafted from precious wood sent by the people of the Southern region, Central Highlands, Quảng Nam - Da Nang, and Trường Sơn Soldiers, and made by the carpentry artisans from Nam Ha, Hà Bắc, and Nghệ An. The lawn in front of the mausoleum consists of 18,000 m^{2} of ginger grass, a native grass from the South, planted by artisan Nguyen Van Hoa. The entrance door to the chamber housing the body was made by two artisans from Gia Hoa village. Flanking the main door are two frangipani trees. In front and behind the mausoleum, 79 cycad trees are planted, symbolizing Ho Chi Minh's 79 years of age. To the south and north sides of the mausoleum are two rows of bamboo, a symbol of Vietnam. Two soldiers always stand guard at the entrance, changing every hour.

At the center of the mausoleum is the marble-lined chamber from Ha Tay where the body lies. On the wall are two large national and party flags, made from 4,000 pieces of ruby stone from Thanh Hóa, with the hammer and sickle and golden star inlaid with bright yellow marble. President Ho Chi Minh's body is placed in a glass case. Through the transparent glass, Ho Chi Minh's body can be seen wearing a faded khaki outfit, with a pair of rubber sandals placed at his feet. During visits, four soldiers stand guard around the glass case. The glass case housing the body is a technical and artistic work crafted by master craftsmen from both Vietnam and the Soviet Union. The bed is made of bronze, adorned with stylized lotus flower patterns, and the three sides of the bed are fitted with high-impact glass. The bed canopy is made of metal, with an automatic lighting and air conditioning system. The bed is placed on a stone pedestal with an automatic elevator system.

The mausoleum is square-shaped, each side measuring 30 meters, with the entrance facing East. The south and north sides have two grandstands, each 65 meters long, for guests during major ceremonies. In front of the mausoleum is Ba Dinh Square, with a parade route and a 380-meter-long lawn divided into 210 green grass squares, lush year-round. In front of the mausoleum is the flagpole, where the flag-raising ceremony begins at 6 a.m. (in hot season); 6:30 a.m. (in cold season) and the flag-lowering ceremony takes place at 9 p.m. daily. Leading directly from the lawn is Bac Son Street, lined with red roses and peach blossoms. At the end of Bac Son Street is the Martyrs' Memorial. To the west of the square is the Ho Chi Minh Memorial Complex, which includes the Ho Chi Minh Museum, and Ho Chi Minh's stilt house. The Ho Chi Minh Mausoleum frequently welcomes numerous visiting delegations from various provinces, cities, and foreign countries.

== Activities ==
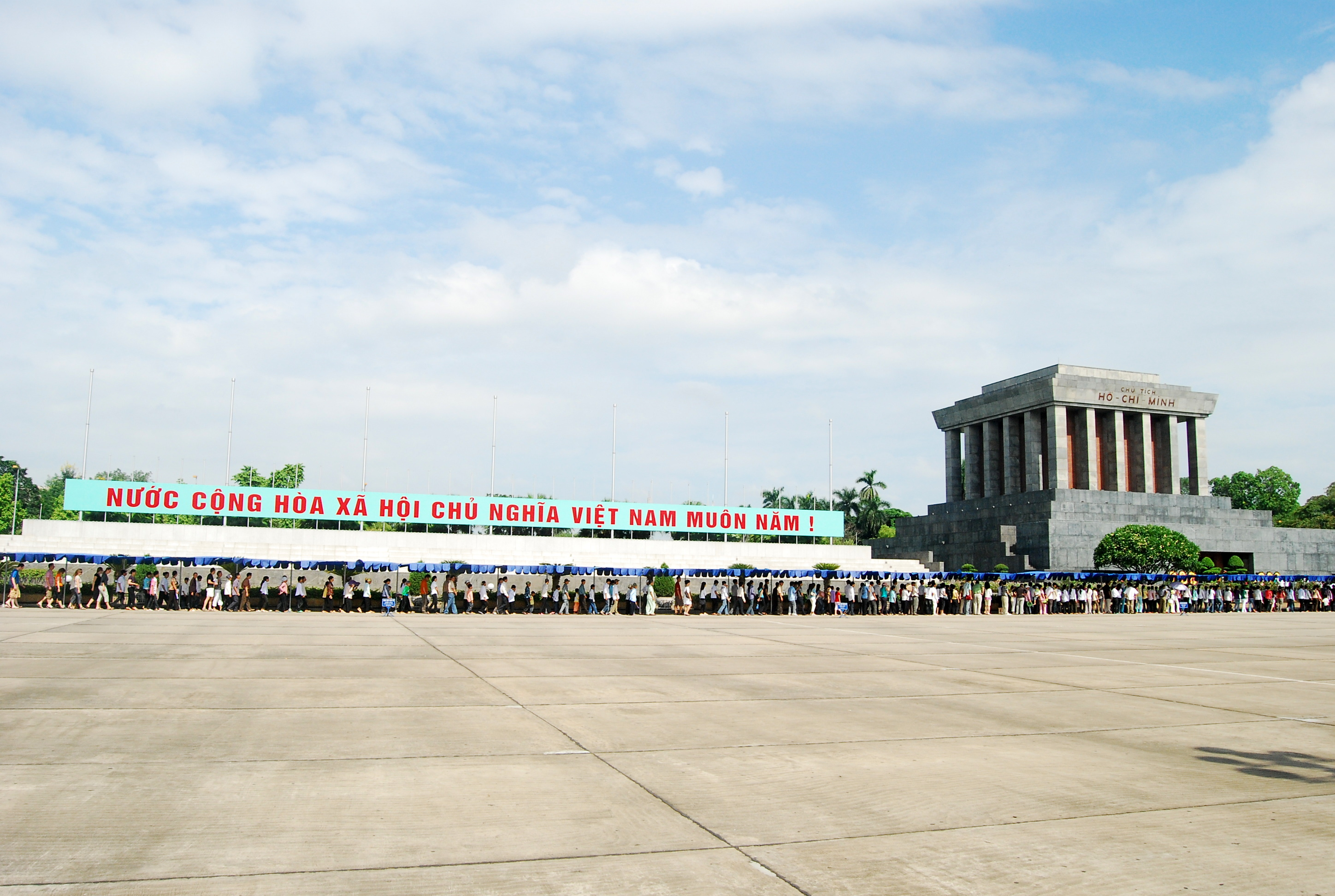
People lining up to visit the mausoleum

Each week, over 15,000 people visit the Ho Chi Minh Mausoleum. Many individuals and groups visit the mausoleum on holidays and important Vietnamese anniversaries.

The Mausoleum at night.

The mausoleum does not charge an entrance fee, and visitors must adhere to requirements such as not wearing overly short or revealing clothing, not bringing cameras, mobile phones with filming and photography functions, turning off phones, not bringing food and drinks, and maintaining silence inside the mausoleum.

As of 2012, nearly 50 million people have visited the Ho Chi Minh Mausoleum, including over 7 million international visitors. For visitors from afar, accommodation arrangements are thoughtfully and carefully organized. Snack, beverage services, cold protection, and services for seriously wounded soldiers and the elderly are well organized. Reception services have been improved, such as renovating waiting areas into two spacious sections, where visitors can rest, admire flowers and plants, and watch documentary films before entering the mausoleum. For groups of legless veterans, honor guards always prepare special wheelchairs for them. Inside the visitation room, there are two rows, with the inner row closer to the body reserved for children.

The Ho Chi Minh Mausoleum is open five days a week, in the mornings on Tuesday, Wednesday, Thursday, Saturday, and Sunday. In the hot season (from April 1 to October 31): from 7:30 to 10:30; in the cold season (from November 1 to March 31 of the following year): from 8:00 to 11:00; on holidays, Saturdays, and Sundays, it opens 30 minutes longer. Each year, the mausoleum closes for scheduled maintenance. On May 19, September 2, and the first day of the Lunar New Year, if these dates fall on a Monday or Friday, visits to the mausoleum are still organized.

== See also ==
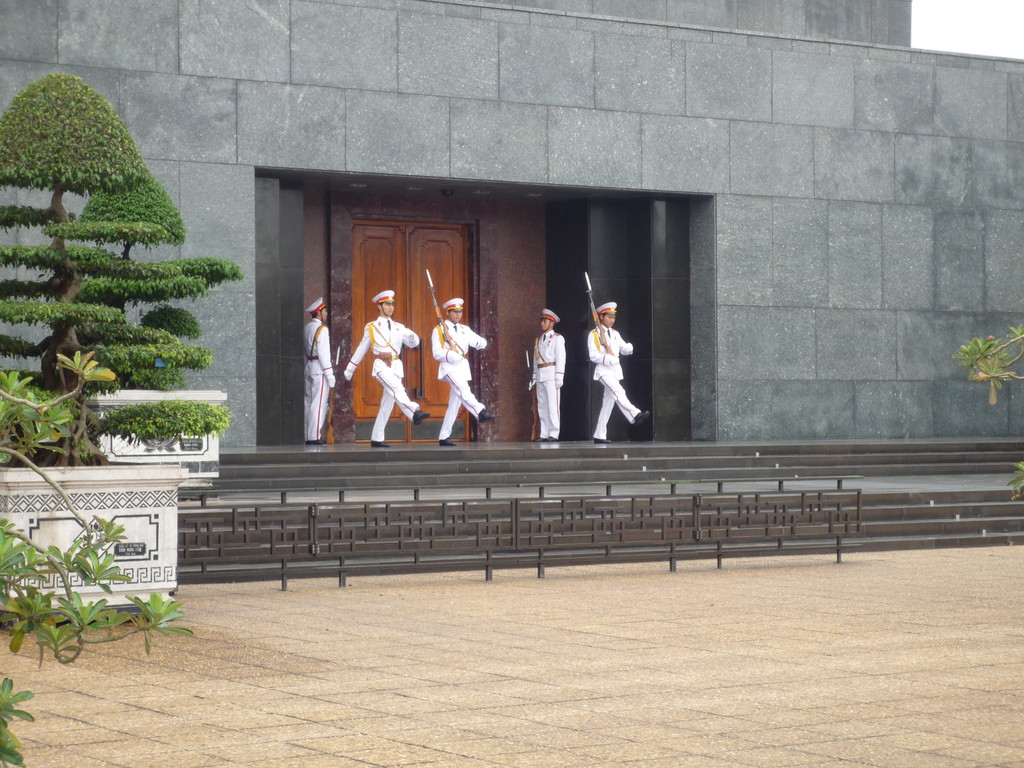
Changing of the guards at the mausoleum

Map

- Ho Chi Minh Museum, which is located next to the mausoleum
- Mai Dịch Cemetery
- Lenin's Mausoleum
- Communist mummies
