= Embassy of Ukraine, Hanoi =

Diplomatic mission of Ukraine to Vietnam

Embassy of Ukraine in Hanoi
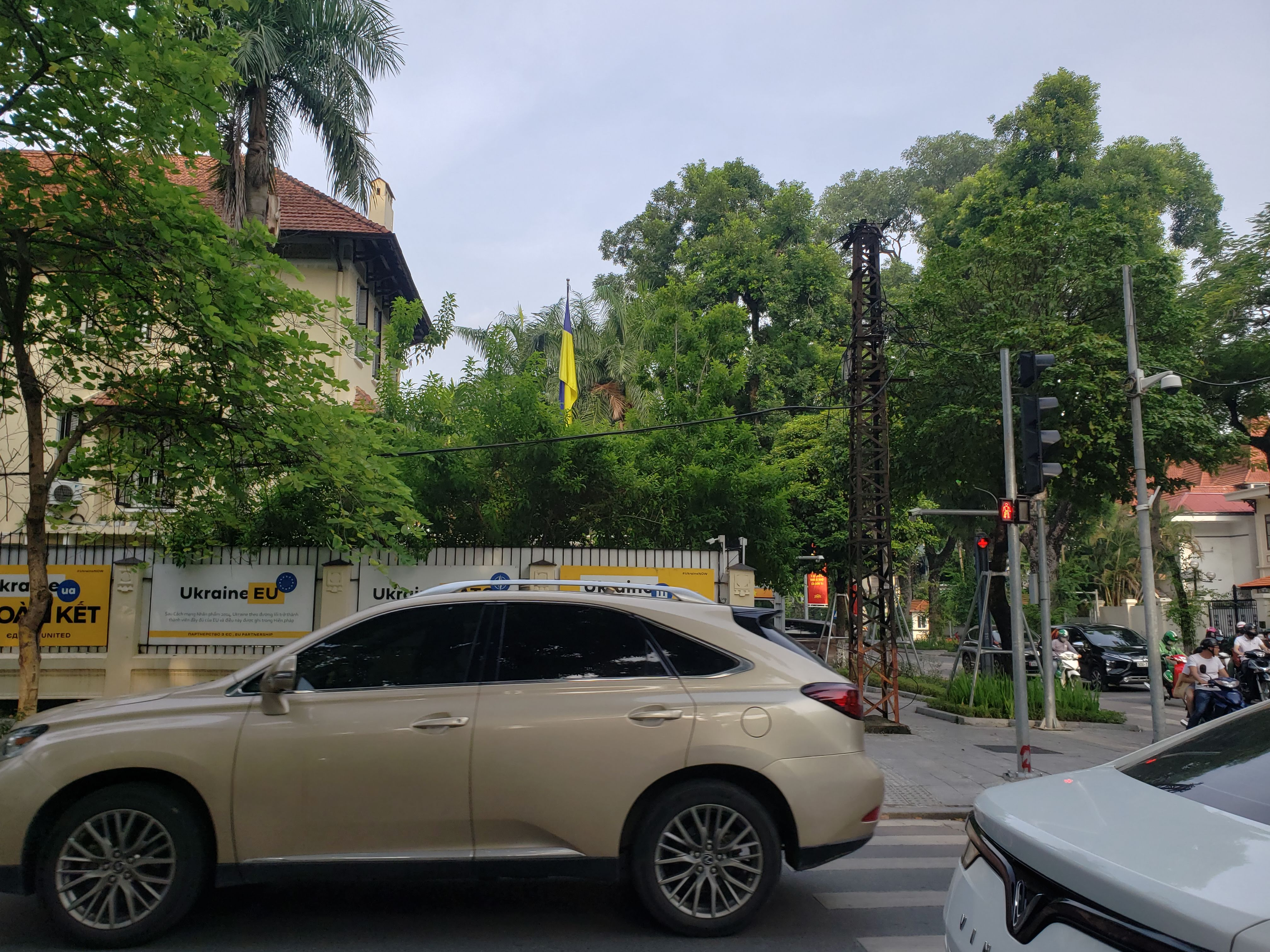
- The embassy in 2022

- Location in Hanoi
- Location: Ba Đình district, Hanoi, Vietnam
- Address: 6 Le Hong Phong, Ba Dinh, Hanoi, Vietnam
- Coordinates: 21.033889°N 105.837222°E
- Ambassador: Gaman Oleksandr
- Website: vietnam.mfa.gov.ua

The embassy of Ukraine to Hanoi is the diplomatic mission of Ukraine to Vietnam, with concurrent accreditation to Cambodia. It is located at 6 Le Hong Phong, Hanoi. It began operations in 1993.

The current ambassador is Gaman Oleksandr, who is also non-resident ambassador to Cambodia.

The embassy has hosted events in support of Ukraine against the Russian invasion for Vietnamese people and diplomats from other countries.

== See also ==
- Ukraine–Vietnam relations
- Diplomatic missions of Ukraine
