= Communist mummies =

Preserved heads of state

The bodies of several Communist heads of state have been mummified and displayed to the public. The practice began following the death of Soviet leader Vladimir Lenin. Since 1924, his remains have been exhibited at Lenin's Mausoleum in the Red Square. Since Lenin, a series of Communist and state-socialist heads of state have been similarly preserved and displayed, often encased in glass and available for public viewing in mausoleums. Current leaders on display include Lenin, Ho Chi Minh, Mao Zedong, Kim Il Sung, and Kim Jong Il.

== Background ==
Early corpse preservation by humans is known from the Chinchorro mummies and Ancient Egyptian funerary practices.

Preservation technologies improved rapidly during the 18th and 19th centuries, with Dutch anatomist Frederik Ruysch innovating a chemical embalming solution (liquor balsamicum) containing mercury oxide, Prussian blue, and clotted pig's blood. His anatomical museum was visited by Peter the Great, who said "I saw boys and girls 4 years old, visibly well vascularized, with open eyes and soft little bodies, and they were not even in alcohol." Ruysch sold his "repository of curiosities", including his embalming recipe, to Peter the Great for 30,000 guilders in 1717. Anatomists continued to make advances in embalming chemicals, significantly in 1859 with the identification of formaldehyde by Russian chemist Aleksandr Butlerov. Following the death of Russian physician Nikolay Pirogov in 1881, he was embalmed using methods he devised. His remains are relatively well-preserved, entombed in a glass-lidded coffin at a church in Vinnytsia.

== History ==
=== Preservation of Lenin ===
Following the death of Soviet leader Vladimir Lenin on 21 January 1924, he was embalmed by Aleksey Abrikosov. On 24 January 1924, his body was displayed in the Kremlin's Hall of Columns. His internal organs were removed during the autopsy, and his brain was dissected. Lenin's body was transferred to the Red Square and placed in a temporary wooden mausoleum. For two months cold weather kept Lenin's remains relatively undeteriorated as hundreds of thousands of Russians came to pay their respects. A committee chaired by Felix Dzerzhinsky was formed to deliberate on the preservation of Lenin's body and Leonid Krasin made an unsuccessful attempt to preserve the body cryogenically. In March, biochemist Boris Zbarsky and anatomist Vladimir Vorobiev tried an experimental embalming technique. The decision to display Lenin permanently was not made until 26 July. It was not until 1929 or 1930 that Lenin was put in the stone mausoleum.

Preservation and repair of Lenin's body has been ongoing since 1924. A Soviet team of specialists informally known as the "Lenin Lab" (now known as the Russian Biomedical Technology Research and Training Centre) was responsible for the body. The annual cost of preserving Lenin's corpse was $200,000 in 2016. The specialists for Lenin's body also preserved the corpses of Ho Chi Minh, Kim Il Sung, and Kim Jong Il.

=== Spread to other countries ===
Since the embalming of Lenin, the Soviet practice spread to other Communist countries in the Eastern Bloc and elsewhere. Following the death of Communist Bulgaria leader Georgi Dimitrov in 1949, his corpse was embalmed and put on display at the Georgi Dimitrov Mausoleum. It remained there until 1990. Like his predecessor, Soviet leader Joseph Stalin was embalmed and put on display next to Lenin in Lenin's Mausoleum. The Soviet leaders lay side-by-side for around eight years before Stalin was removed in a de-Stalinization purge. Czech leader Klement Gottwald was embalmed and preserved in a mausoleum at the National Monument at Vítkov from 1953 to 1962 before finally being cremated.

While not a head of state, Argentine First Lady Eva Perón was embalmed in 1952 and her blood was replaced with glycerine to preserve the organs and lend an appearance of "artistically rendered sleep". Her body was to be displayed publicly in a monument that was being constructed. Meanwhile, her body was displayed in her former office at the General Confederation of Labour building for almost two years. Before the monument was completed, Juan Perón was overthrown in a 1955 coup, and the military dictatorship secretly transported her body to Italy, where it remained until 1971.

Following the death of Ho Chi Minh in 1969, Soviet scientists from the Lenin Lab were flown into Vietnam to assist in the preservation of the body. Chemicals and equipment were also flown in. The initial embalming process took place at a temporary tomb in a secret underground chamber north of Hanoi. After the collapse of the Soviet Union, Russia started charging Vietnam for embalming chemicals.

While Chinese leader Mao Zedong wanted to be cremated, he was embalmed following his death in 1976. His remains were preserved with formaldehyde, during which his head was said to have "swelled up like a football".

In 1979 after the death of Angolan President Agostinho Neto in Moscow, the same Russian technicians who had worked on Lenin's corpse embalmed Neto. Neto was ultimately buried in 1991 by the wishes of his former spouse.

While not a Communist, the body of President of the Philippines Ferdinand Marcos was preserved following his death in 1989. President Marcos died in exile in Hawaii. After denial of President Cory Aquino of the return of his remains, his body was interred in Byodo-In, a Japanese Buddhist temple, on the island of Oahu. In 1993, his body was allowed to be returned to the Philippines, where his body was displayed in a glass-topped, refrigerated coffin at the Ferdinand E. Marcos Presidential Center. In 2016, his body is reinterred in the Libingan ng mga bayani.

Following the death of North Korean leader Kim Il Sung in 1994, he was embalmed by Russian scientists. He is displayed in a mausoleum in the Kumsusan Palace of the Sun in Pyongyang. After Kim Jong Il died in 2011, he joined his father on display after being embalmed by scientists from the Lenin Lab in a laboratory that was built into the mausoleum.

Following the death of Venezuelan leader Hugo Chávez in 2013 plans to embalm and permanently display his body in a transparent sarcophagus were abandoned after German and Russian scientists concluded that too much time had passed to properly preserve it.

== Preservation ==
Lenin's remains are preserved by the "Lenin Lab", officially the Center for Scientific Research and Teaching Methods in Biochemical Technologies, which has a "Mausoleum group" consisting of five or six anatomists, surgeons, and biochemists. The centre has treated its embalming techniques as a state secret. By 1993, the centre had 150 employees. The centre has assisted in the preservation of Ho Chi Minh, Kim Il-sung and Kim Jong-il, among others. Ilya Zbarsky and his father Boris Zbarsky both headed the embalming processes as Lenin's Mausoleum. The Lenin Lab concentrates on preserving the physical form and not the biological tissue. Flesh and skin are sometimes replaced with plastic and other materials. In the case of Lenin's remains, his blood vessels and arteries were removed during autopsy, so he wears a double-layered rubber suit and scientists use microinjection techniques to deliver embalming fluids. According to anthropologist Alexei Yurchak, the bodies are re-embalmed every one and a half to two years. During the six-week process, the body is submerged in formaldehyde, alcohol, hydrogen peroxide, potassium acetate, sodium acetate, acetic acid and glycerol solution baths. Lenin's skin fat has largely been replaced with a flexible material composed of carotene, glycerin, and paraffin.

Mausoleums where leaders' bodies are preserved for public exhibition serve as pilgrimage sites and tourist attractions.

== Preserved communist heads of state ==
Leader	Location	State	Dates of preservation	Notes
Vladimir Lenin	Lenin's Mausoleum	Soviet Union	1924; 102 years ago	During World War II, when Nazi armies threatened to enter Moscow, Lenin's body was removed to Tyumen, Siberia. In 2019, over 2.5 million people queued to see Lenin's remains. A new set of clothing is ordered for Lenin every three years.
Georgi Dimitrov	Georgi Dimitrov Mausoleum	People's Republic of Bulgaria	1949–1990	Following Dimitrov's death in Russia, the Georgi Dimitrov Mausoleum was built in six days. Dimitrov's body was embalmed and encased in glass. In 1990, his remains were cremated and the ashes were buried in Central Sofia Cemetery.
Khorloogiin Choibalsan	Sükhbaatar's Mausoleum	Mongolian People's Republic	1952–2005	Choibalsan was embalmed by Soviet scientists from the Lenin Lab, but was not "accorded long-term preservation" under the direction of the Kremlin. His body was initially buried in the Altan-Ölgii National Cemetery in Ulaanbaatar before being transferred to Sükhbaatar's Mausoleum in 1954. His remains were cremated and reinterred at Altan-Ölgii National Cemetery after the mausoleum was torn down in 2005.
Joseph Stalin	Lenin's Mausoleum	Soviet Union	1953–1961	Following his death in 1953, Stalin was embalmed and placed in Lenin's Mausoleum next to Lenin. Stalin was removed from Lenin's Mausoleum in 1961 during the period of De-Stalinisation and interred in the Kremlin Wall Necropolis.
Klement Gottwald	Klement Gottwald Mausoleum; National Monument at Vítkov	Czechoslovak Socialist Republic	1953–1962	Gottwald died in office in 1953 after attending the funeral of Stalin. His body was embalmed and displayed in a mausoleum at the National Monument at Vítkov. In 1962, his body was cremated, the ashes returned to the Žižka Monument and placed in a sarcophagus. Some accounts relate that his body had blackened and was decomposing due to a botched embalming, although other witnesses have disputed this. After the end of communism, Gottwald's ashes were removed from the Žižka Monument (in 1990) and placed in a common grave at Prague's Olšany Cemetery, together with the ashes of about 20 other communist leaders which had also originally been placed in the Žižka Monument.
Ho Chi Minh	Ho Chi Minh Mausoleum	Vietnam	1969; 57 years ago	A team of Russian and Vietnamese scientists was convened to assess the state of Ho's remains in 2019.
Mao Zedong	Chairman Mao Memorial Hall	China	1976; 50 years ago	
Agostinho Neto	Mausoleum of Agostinho Neto	Angola	1979–1991	After dying in Moscow, Neto was embalmed by Soviet scientists. His mausoleum in Luanda was nicknamed "Angola's Sputnik".
Forbes Burnham	Burnham's Mausoleum; Guyana Botanical Gardens	Guyana	1985; 41 years ago	Burnham was buried briefly before being exhumed and transported to the Soviet Union for preservation by the Lenin Lab. His body was returned in 1986 but was never publicly exhibited.
Kim Il Sung	Kumsusan Palace of the Sun	North Korea	1994; 32 years ago	Embalmers from the Lenin Lab spent nearly a year preparing Kim Il Sung's body for display. In the book North of the DMZ, Andrei Lankov writes that North Korea was rumoured to have paid $1 million for the embalming.
Kim Jong Il	Kumsusan Palace of the Sun	North Korea	2011; 15 years ago	

== See also ==
- Communist nostalgia
- Cult of personality
- God-Building
- Incorruptibility
- List of mummies
- Lying in state
- Plastination
