= Ba Đình Square =

Square in Hanoi, Vietnam

- Public square
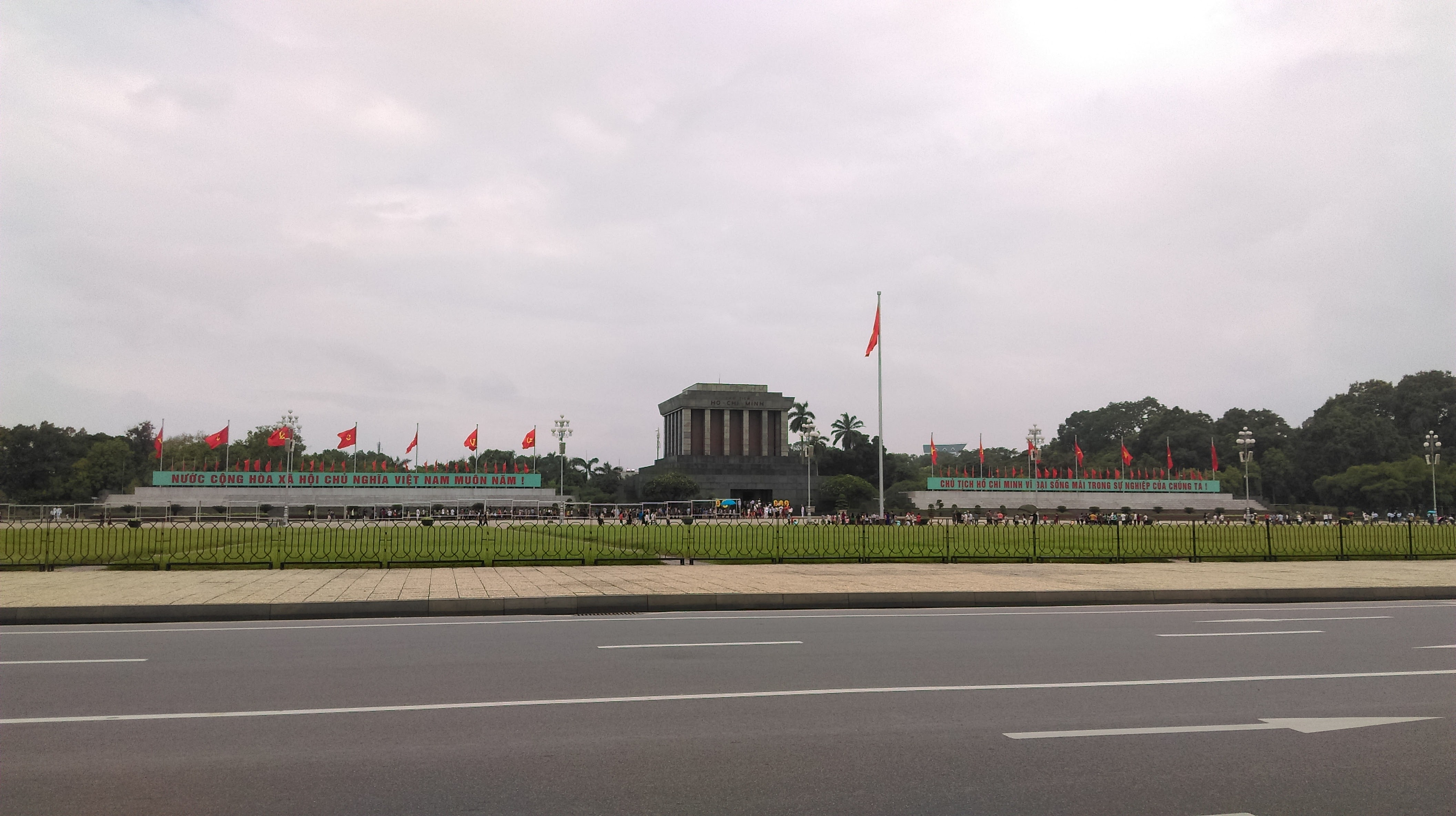
- Centered by Ho Chi Minh Mausoleum
- Surface: Concrete, grass
- Dedicated to: Ba Đình Uprising
- Location: Ba Đình District; Hanoi, Vietnam
- Interactive map of Ba Đình Square
- Coordinates: 21°2′12″N 105°50′9″E

Ba Đình Square (Vietnamese: Quảng trường Ba Đình) is a square in Hanoi, Vietnam, where President Ho Chi Minh read the Proclamation of Independence of the Democratic Republic of Vietnam on September 2, 1945. It is named after the Ba Đình Uprising, an anti-French rebellion that occurred in Vietnam in 1886–1887 as part of the Cần Vương movement. When Ho Chi Minh died, the granite Ho Chi Minh Mausoleum was built here to display his embalmed body. It remains a major site of tourism and pilgrimage.

== Geography ==
Ba Đình Square is in the center of Ba Đình District, with several important buildings located around it, including the President's Palace, the Ministry of Foreign Affairs, the Ministry of Planning and Investment, and the National Assembly Building.

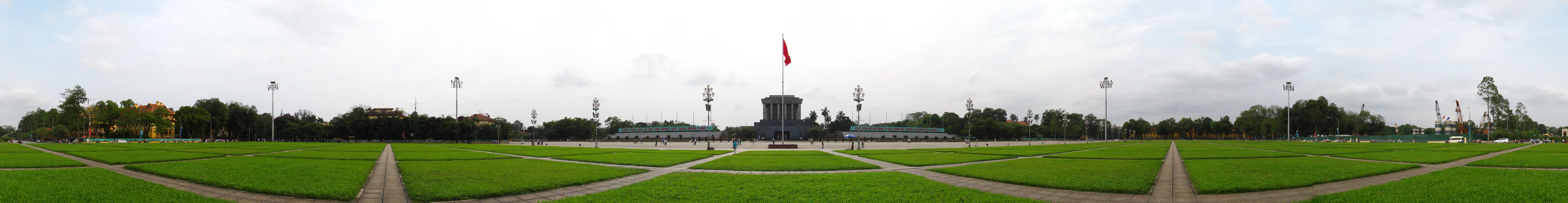
A 360-degree view of Ba Đình Square.

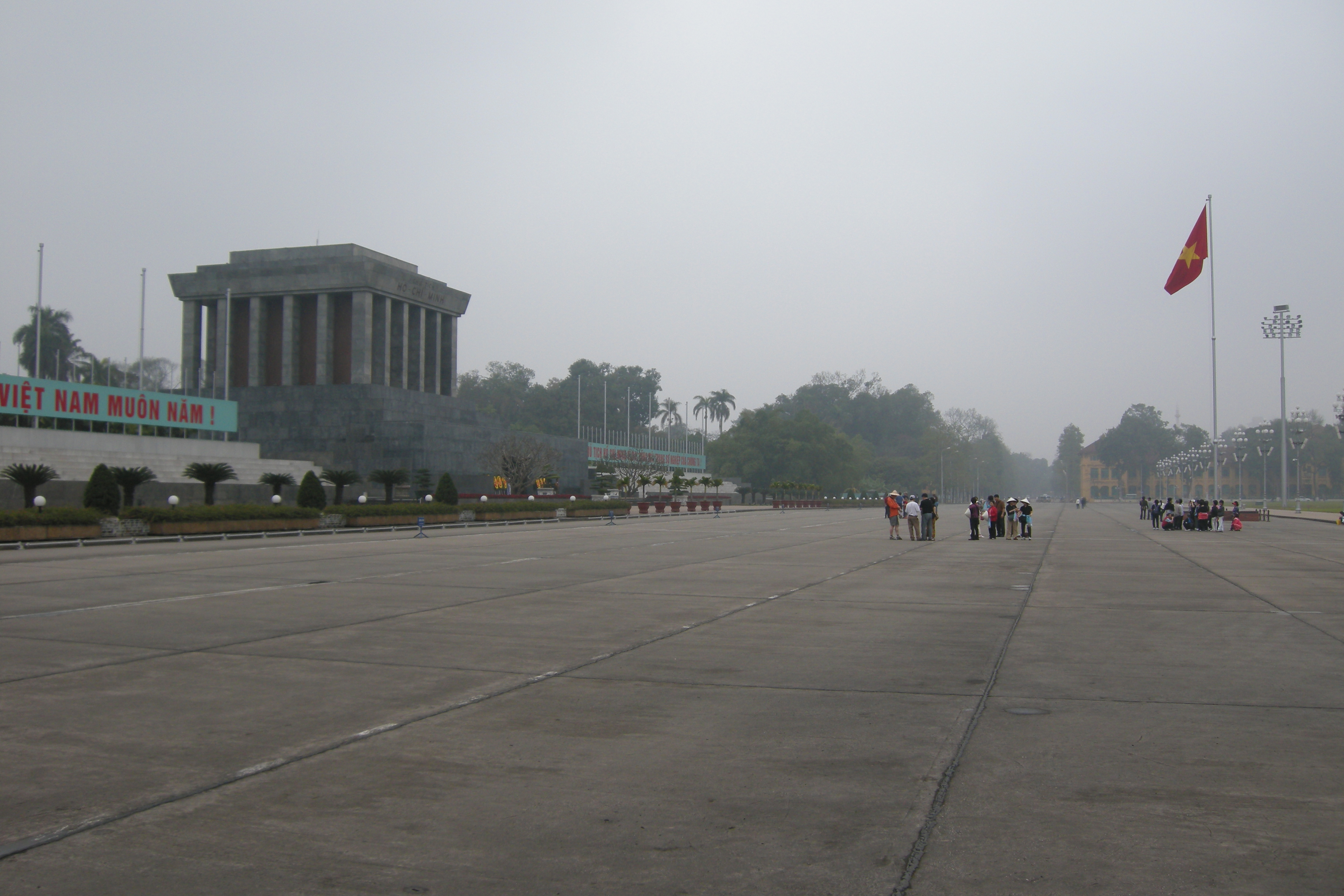
The road in front of Ho Chi Minh Mausoleum. It is the main venue for military parades.
