= Lenin's Mausoleum =

Tomb in Moscow, Russia

- Мавзолей Ленина; Mavzoley Lenina
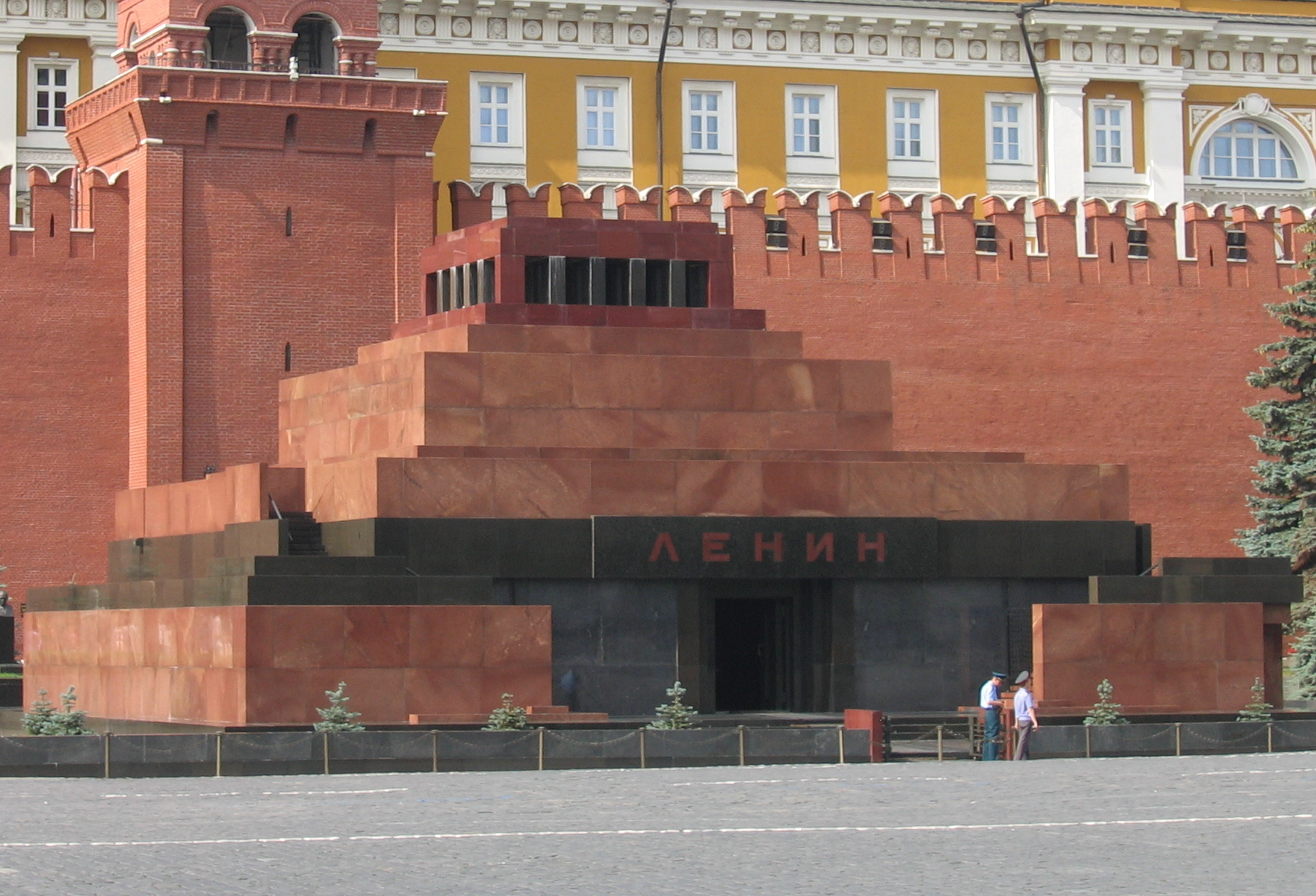
- Lenin's Mausoleum, 2006
- Interactive map of Lenin's Mausoleum
- Location: Moscow, Russia
- Coordinates: 55°45′13″N 37°37′11″E
- Designer: Alexei Shchusev
- Type: Memorial
- Material: Concrete and marble
- Completion date: 10 November 1930; 96 years ago
- Dedicated to: Vladimir Lenin; Joseph Stalin (formerly)

Lenin's Mausoleum, (Note: Russian: Мавзолей Ленина, romanized: Mavzoley Lenina, IPA: [məvzɐˈlʲej ˈlʲenʲɪnə]) also known as Lenin's Tomb, is a mausoleum located at Red Square in Moscow, Russia. It serves as the resting place of Soviet leader Vladimir Lenin, whose preserved body has been on public display since his death in 1924, with rare exceptions in wartime. From 1953 to 1961, it was named Lenin's and Stalin's Mausoleum. The outdoor tribune over the mausoleum's entrance was used by Soviet leaders to observe military parades. The structure, designed by Alexei Shchusev, incorporates some elements from ancient mausoleums such as the Step Pyramid, the Tomb of Cyrus the Great and, to some degree, the Temple of the Inscriptions.

== History ==
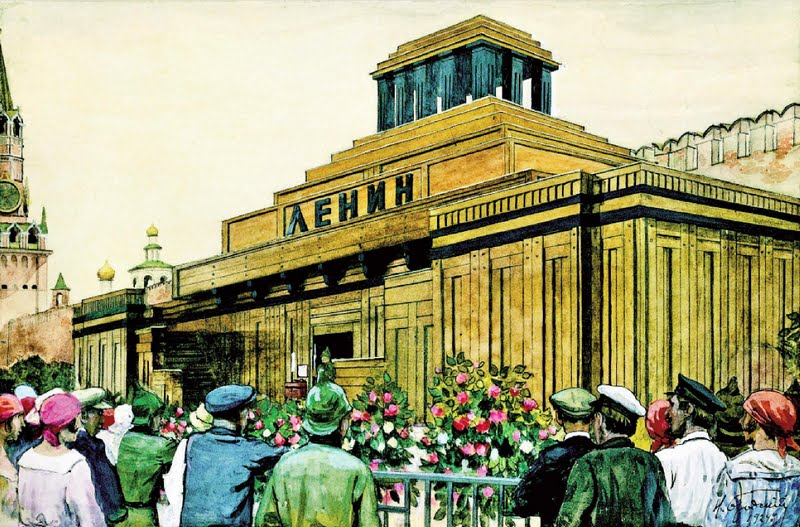
The second non-temporary wooden version (1924–1930) of Lenin's Mausoleum

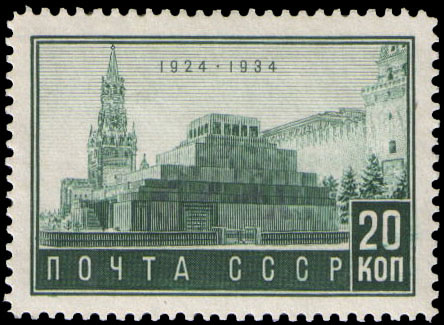
The completed mausoleum on a 1934 stamp

Two days after Vladimir Lenin's death on 21 January 1924, architect Alexei Shchusev was tasked with building a structure suitable for viewing of the body by mourners. A wooden tomb, built in Red Square close to the Moscow Kremlin Wall, was ready on 27 January, the same day Lenin's coffin was placed inside. More than 100,000 Soviet citizens visited the tomb in the next six weeks. By the end of May, Shchusev had replaced the tomb with a larger, more elaborate mausoleum, and Lenin's body was transferred to a sarcophagus designed by architect Konstantin Melnikov. The new wooden mausoleum was opened to the public on 1 August 1924.

Pathologist Alexei Ivanovich Abrikosov had embalmed Lenin's body shortly after his death, with Boris Zbarsky and Vladimir Vorobiev later being tasked with its ongoing preservation. Zbarsky was soon assisted by his son Ilya Zbarsky, a recent graduate of Moscow University, who likened the work on Lenin's body to that of ancient Egyptian priests. In 1925, Boris Zbarsky and Vorobiev urged the Soviet government to replace the wooden structure after mold was found in the walls and even on the body itself. A new mausoleum of marble, porphyry, granite, and labradorite, designed by Shchusev, was completed in 1930. The mausoleum also served as a viewing stand for Soviet leaders to review military parades on Red Square.

Lenin's body has been on almost continuous public display inside the mausoleum since its completion in 1930. It was kept under a continuous ceremonial guard of KGB soldiers. In October 1941, during the Second World War, known in Russia as the Great Patriotic War, when it appeared that Moscow might be captured, the body was evacuated to Tyumen in Siberia. After the war, the body was returned, and the tomb was reopened. Between 1953 and 1961, the embalmed body of Joseph Stalin shared a spot next to Lenin's; Stalin's body was eventually removed as part of de-Stalinization and Khrushchev's Thaw, and buried in the Kremlin Wall Necropolis. Soviet sculptor Nikolai Tomsky designed a new sarcophagus for Lenin's body in 1973.

On 26 January 1924, the head of the Moscow Garrison issued an order to place the guard of honour, popularly known as the "Number One Sentry", at the mausoleum. The guard of honour was disbanded following the Russian constitutional crisis of 1993, but was restored at the Tomb of the Unknown Soldier in Alexander Garden four years later.

== Architectural features ==
=== Project selection and construction ===
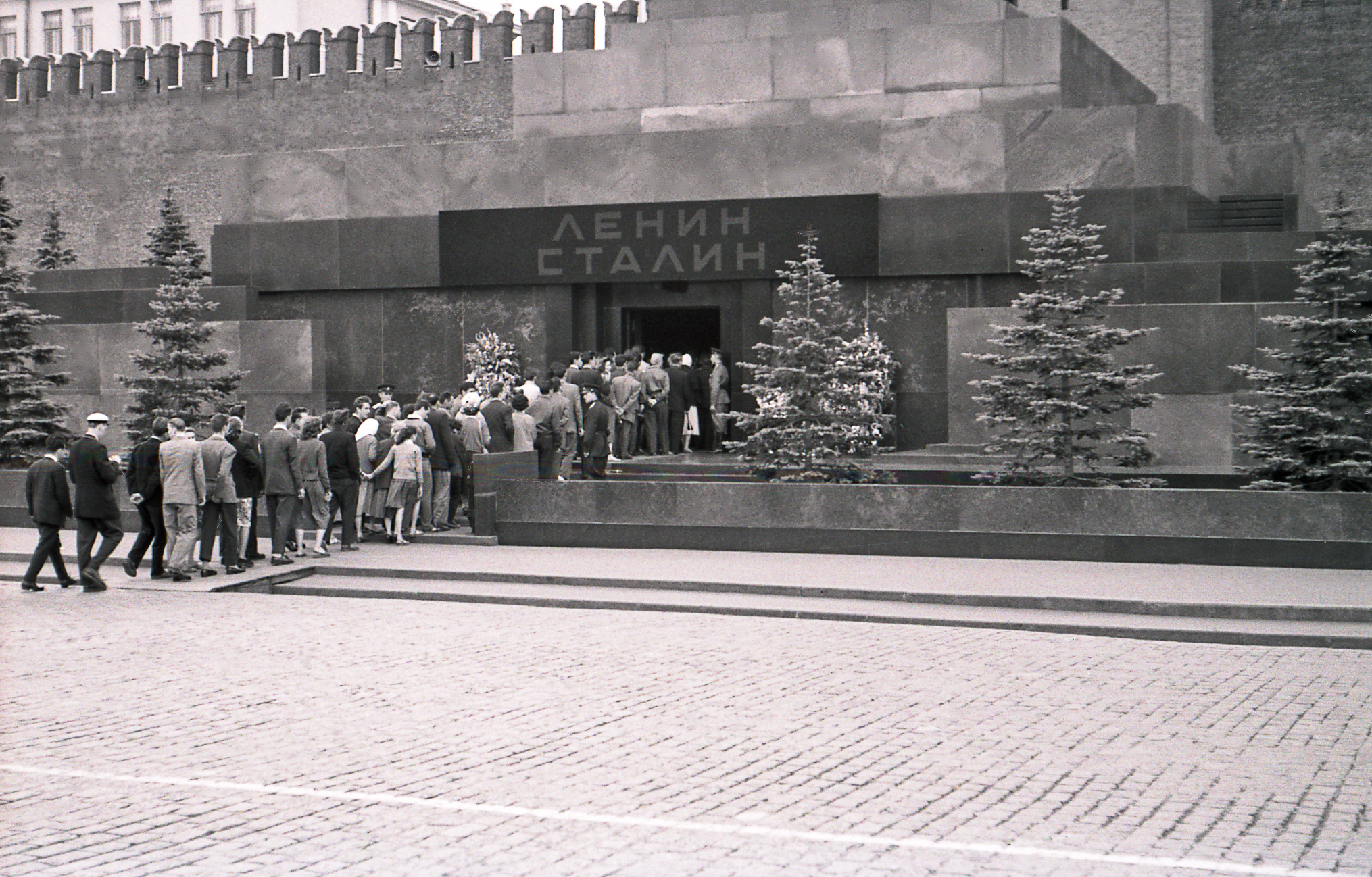
Lenin's and Stalin's Mausoleum, 1957

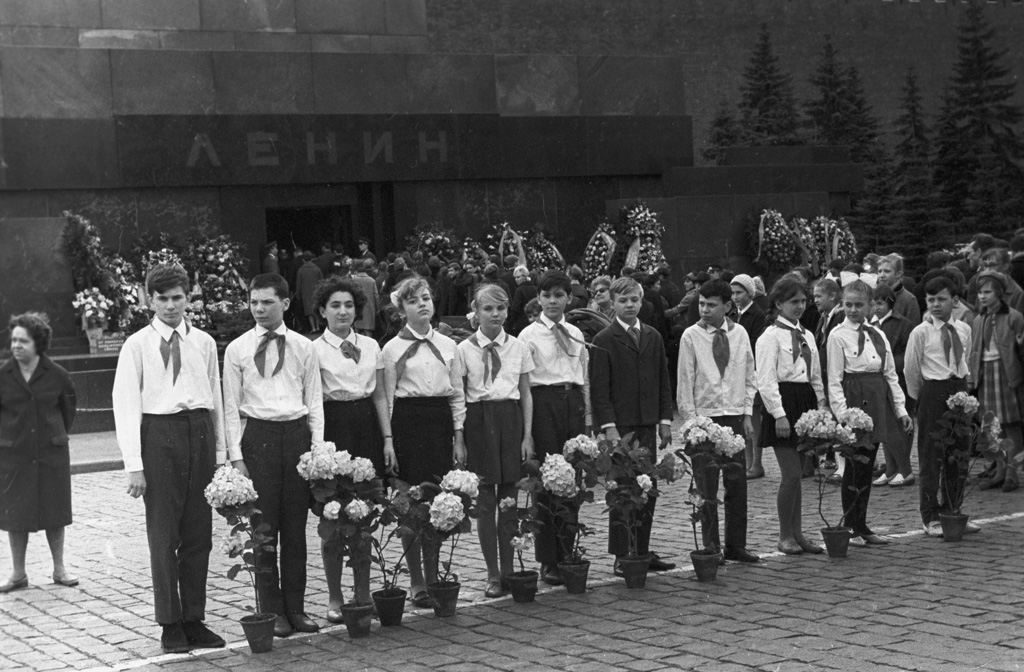
Young Pioneers at Lenin's Mausoleum, 1968

In January 1925, the Presidium of the Central Executive Committee announced an international competition to design a stone tomb for Lenin's body. The commission received 117 suggestions and sketches. Among them, there were offered different variants: a ship with Lenin's figure on board, a round mausoleum in the shape of a globe, an analogue of an Egyptian pyramid and a mausoleum in the shape of the five-pointed star. But after considering the proposed designs, the commission decided to retain the image of a wooden mausoleum. Shchusev created some new drawings based on old sketches and made a model in granite, and his project was approved. It was decided to clad the new building with red granite, as well as black and grey labradorite.

The basement under the sarcophagus weighed twenty tonnes. It was installed on a thick layer of sand, and guarding piles–meant to protect the tomb from vibration–were driven around the slab. Altogether 2900 m^{2} of polished granite was required for the construction, each square metre of which was processed for three days on average. The upper slab of red Karelian Shoksha quartzite was placed on columns of granite, whose different species were specially brought to Moscow from all the republics of the USSR.

The stone mausoleum was completed October 1930, after sixteen months of construction. Compared to the previous wooden mausoleum, the new building was built three metres higher, the outer volume was increased 4.5 times – 5800 m³, and the inner volume 12 times, up to 2400 m³. Its total weight was about 10,000 tonnes. The mausoleum occupied the highest point on Red Square.

During construction, both the mausoleum and the necropolis were brought to a unified architectural design: differently characterised tombstones and monuments were removed, individual and collective burials at Nikolskaya and Spasskaya Towers were united, and the fence was redesigned and installed. Guest stands for ten thousand seats that were installed on either side of the mausoleum.

=== Interiors ===
The mausoleum contains a vestibule, Mourning Hall and two staircases. Opposite the entrance is a huge granite block bearing the State Emblem of the Soviet Union.

Two staircases lead down from the vestibule. The left-hand staircase, measuring three meters wide, takes visitors down to the Funeral Hall. The walls of the descent are of grey labradorite. The Funeral Hall is a ten-meter cube with a stepped ceiling. A band of black labradorite runs across the entire room, on which pilasters of red porphyry are placed. Next to the pilasters are bands of bright red smalt, to the right of which are bands of black labradorite. This combination creates the effect of flames and banners flying in the wind. In the centre of the hall is a black pedestal with a sarcophagus.

The upper stepped slab of the sarcophagus is supported by four inconspicuous metal columns, which gives the impression that the slab is hanging in the air. The lower slab is covered in reddish jasper. The sarcophagus is made up of two inclined conical glasses, which are held together by a bronze frame. Illuminators and light filters are embedded in the upper part of the frame, giving an animating pink coloring and reducing heat. On either side of the sarcophagus are the battle and labour bronze banners, which appear satiny due to the special illumination. In the headboard is the Soviet State Emblem framed by oak and laurel branches. At the foot, there are branches twisted with ribbon.

The exit from the Funeral Hall to the right-hand staircase leads back to Red Square.

== Preserving the body ==
Lenin's preserved body inside the mausoleum

Published view of the embalmed Lenin from 1925.

One of the main problems the embalmers faced was the appearance of dark spots on Lenin's body, especially on the face and hands. They managed to solve the problem by using a variety of different reagents. While working on ways to preserve the body, Boris Zbarsky invented a new way to purify medical chloroform used for preservation. For example, if a patch of wrinkling or discoloration occurred, it was treated with a solution of acetic acid and ethyl alcohol diluted with water. Hydrogen peroxide could be used to restore the tissues' original coloring. Damp spots were removed by means of disinfectants such as quinine or phenol. Lenin's remains are soaked in a solution of glycerol and potassium acetate on a yearly basis. Synthetic eyeballs were placed in Lenin's orbital cavities to prevent his eye sockets from collapsing.

Until the collapse of the Soviet Union in 1991, the continued preservation work was funded by the Soviet government. After 1991, the government discontinued financial support, after which the mausoleum was funded by private donations. In 2016 the Russian government reversed its earlier decision and announced it would spend 13 million rubles to preserve Lenin's body.

== Contemporary ==
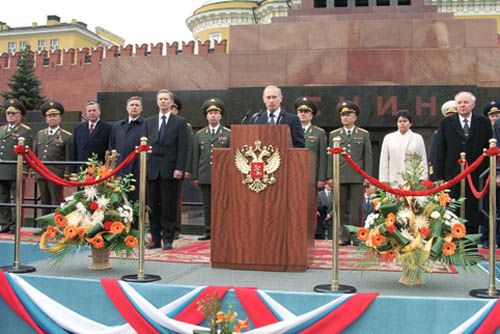
Vladimir Putin in front of Lenin's Mausoleum in 2001

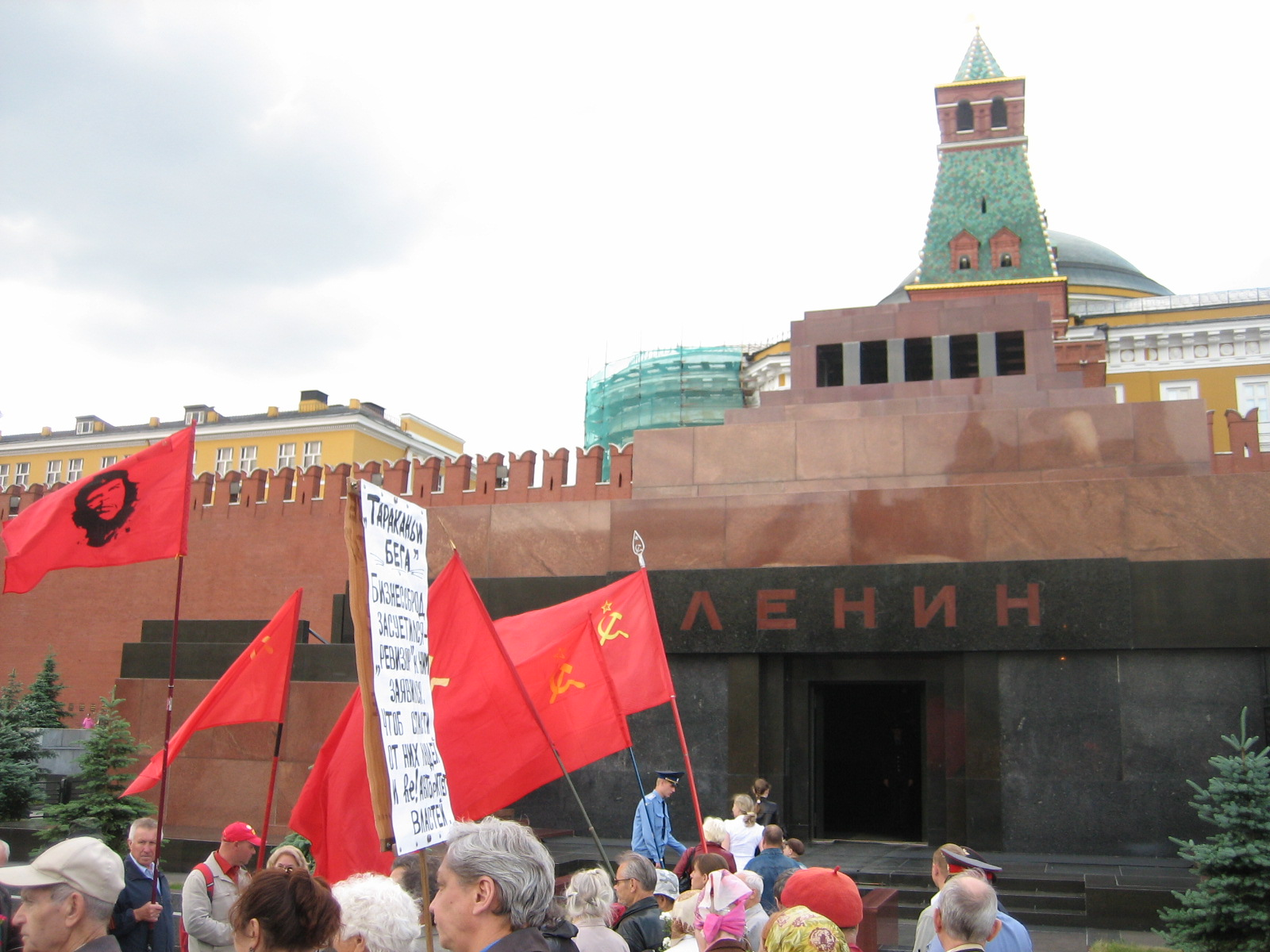
Russian Communists at Lenin's Mausoleum, 2009

Lenin's Mausoleum is open to the public on Tuesdays, Wednesdays, Thursdays, Saturdays and Sundays from 10:00–13:00. Entrance is free of charge. Visitors are required to show respect whilst inside the tomb: photography and filming inside the mausoleum are forbidden, as is talking, smoking, keeping hands in pockets or (unless female) wearing hats.

Lenin's Mausoleum has undergone several changes in appearance since the collapse of the Soviet Union. One of the first noticeable was the placement of gates at the staircases leading to the tribune. After the removal of the guard, this was necessary to prevent unauthorised usage of the tribune. Beginning in 2012, the mausoleum underwent foundation reconstruction, necessitated by the construction of a building attached to the mausoleum in 1983. The new building housed an escalator used by members of the Politburo to ascend the tribune. In 1995–96, when Yeltsin used the tribune, he used the staircase and not the escalator. The escalator was removed after the tribune became disused. Following renovations, the mausoleum was reopened on 30 April 2013, in time for the 1 May celebration of "The Day of Spring and Labour".

== Proposals for burial ==
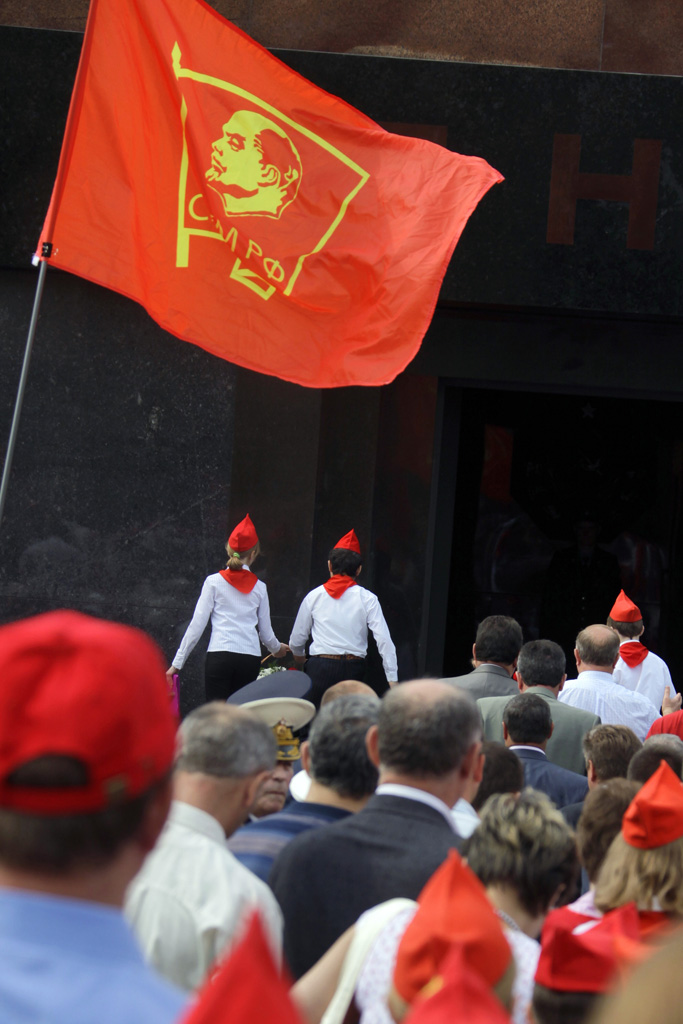
Participants in the ceremony of induction into pioneers at the Lenin Mausoleum on Red Square. In the foreground is the flag of the Communist Union of Youth.

Since 1991, there has been discussion about moving Lenin's body to the Kremlin Wall Necropolis. Russian President Boris Yeltsin, with the support of the Russian Orthodox Church, intended to close the mausoleum and bury Lenin next to Lenin's mother, Maria Alexandrovna Ulyanova, at the Volkovo Cemetery in Saint Petersburg. Yeltsin's successor, Vladimir Putin, opposed this. On 24 July 2001, he stated:

Our country lived under the monopoly power of the CPSU for 70 years. This is the lifetime of an entire generation. Many people associate their own lives with the name of Lenin. For them, Lenin's burial will mean that they worshiped false values, that they set false goals for themselves and that their lives were lived in vain. I think that actions of this kind can lead to the kind of destructive state that we have already experienced.

In 2009, Vladimir Medinsky, a State Duma deputy from United Russia, noted that there was no point in keeping Lenin's body in the mausoleum:

The maintenance of an ideological artifact in the center of the capital is an immoral act, meaningless from the point of view of budget spending, harmful from an ideological point of view, and cruel both towards Lenin's relatives and towards people who do not share the communist ideology.

On 20 April 2017, deputies from the Liberal Democratic Party of Russia and United Russia proposed for consideration a bill on the burial of Lenin's body, which proposed to establish a procedure for the burial of historical figures. The very fact of the need for burial was considered established, but specific dates were not specified:

In order to consider the issues of reburial of the remains of historical figures, whose activities influenced the course and outcome of major historical events, in order to perpetuate their memory, the government of the Russian Federation, in the manner established by it, forms interdepartmental commissions... the remains of Vladimir Ilyich Ulyanov (Lenin) are subject to reburial... The procedure, timing and place of reburial of the remains of Vladimir Ilyich Ulyanov (Lenin) are determined by the government of the Russian Federation, taking into account the proposals of the interdepartmental commission.

The absence of specific deadlines would allow the bill to be applied whenever the public is ready to bury Lenin's body. After discussing and criticizing the bill, United Russia deputies withdrew their signatures. The government did not support the bill. The provisions of the bill allow for burials without taking into account the will of the deceased and at the expense of the federal budget, but the sources of funding have not been identified, which makes it difficult to assess the financial consequences of the adoption of this law.

In 2018, RIA Novosti reported that Vladimir Petrov, a member of the legislative assembly of Leningrad Oblast, proposed creating a special commission in order to examine the question of the removal of Lenin's body from the mausoleum. Petrov seemed to be willing to replace the corpse with a copy made of synthetic resin.

In November 2018, Sergey Malinkovich, the central committee secretary of the Communists of Russia political party, called for the criminal prosecution of Vladimir Petrov for insulting religious believers by calling for Lenin's preserved body to be buried. He said Petrov's proposal had violated the Criminal Code of Russia by insulting religious feelings and inciting hatred, and that he planned to "keep hounding" Petrov for his remarks.

== See also ==
- Kumsusan Palace of the Sun
- Ho Chi Minh Mausoleum
- Kremlin Wall Necropolis
- Tampere Lenin Museum
- Chairman Mao Memorial Hall
- Pyramid of Tirana
- House of Flowers
- Sun Yat-sen Mausoleum
- Che Guevara Mausoleum
- Santa Ifigenia Cemetery
- Sükhbaatar's Mausoleum
- Georgi Dimitrov Mausoleum
- National Monument in Vitkov
- Mustafa Kemal Atatürk's Mausoleum
- Mausoleum of Ruhollah Khomeini
- Raj Ghat
- Mazar-e-Quaid
- Bourguiba mausoleum
- Türkmenbaşy Ruhy Mosque
- Artigas Mausoleum
- Martyrs' Mausoleum, Yangon
- Mausoleum of Arafat
- Leninism
- Marxism–Leninism
- Communist mummies
