= KGB Security Troops =

USSR military troops

The KGB Security Troops were the uniformed paramilitary troops of the Soviet KGB which engaged in military-related activities that are not mentioned in legislation governing the Soviet Armed forces. The KGB controlled elite units that guarded the highest party officials and stood a continuous ceremonial guard at the Lenin Mausoleum. The special KGB signal troops also operated communications linking the party with the Ministry of Defense and the major territorial commands. Another KGB armed force guarded sensitive military, scientific, and industrial installations in the Soviet Union and, until the late 1960s, controlled Soviet nuclear warhead stockpiles. They also guarded government installations (nuclear weapons, etc.), operated the Moscow VIP subway (Russian journalists have reported that the existence of Metro-2 is neither confirmed nor denied by the Federal Security Service of the Russian Federation (FSB) or the Moscow Metro administration.), and secured Government–Party telephone system.

Following the collapse of the Soviet Union in 1991, Russian president Boris Yeltsin transformed it to the Federal Protective Service (FPS).

The KGB's Security Troops, which numbered about 40,000 in 1989, provided the KGB with a coercive potential. Although Soviet sources did not specify the functions of these special troops, Western analysts thought that their main tasks were to guard the top leadership in the Kremlin and key government-party buildings and officials at the republic and regional levels, counter-insurgency and counter-terrorist operations, and direct action in foreign countries. Such troops were presumably under the Ninth Directorate of the KGB.

The Security Troops also included several units of signal troops, which were reportedly responsible for installation, maintenance, and operation of secret communications facilities for leading party and government bodies, including the Ministry of Defense. These troops were probably under the command of the Eighth Chief Directorate.

== Organization ==
The security troops were controlled by the Ninth Chief Directorate (Guards and KGB Protection Service), but also had elements within the Eighth Chief Directorate which monitored/managed national, foreign, and overseas communications, cryptologic equipment, and research and development, and possibly the Sixteenth Directorate (SIGINT and communications interception) which operated the national and government telephone and telegraph systems.

== Operations ==
Such troops were reportedly employed, along with the MVD's Internal Troops, to suppress public protests and disperse demonstrations, such as that of the Crimean Tatars in July 1987 and those in the republics of Armenia and Azerbaijan in March 1988. Special KGB troops also were trained for sabotage and diversionary missions abroad. Other special KGB troops were intended for counterterrorist and counterinsurgency operations.

== Appearance ==
The uniforms and insignia of the KGB Security Troops were similar to those worn by the armed forces of the Soviet Union but with Royal Blue piping and distinctions, and their shoulder boards were marked 'GB' (meaning "of State Security") that further distinguished them from other special troops, such as the Soviet Border Troops.

== See also ==
- Russian Federal Protective Service
- Security police
- Securitate
