= Ba Đình district =

Ba Dinh district Quận Ba Đình
- Urban district
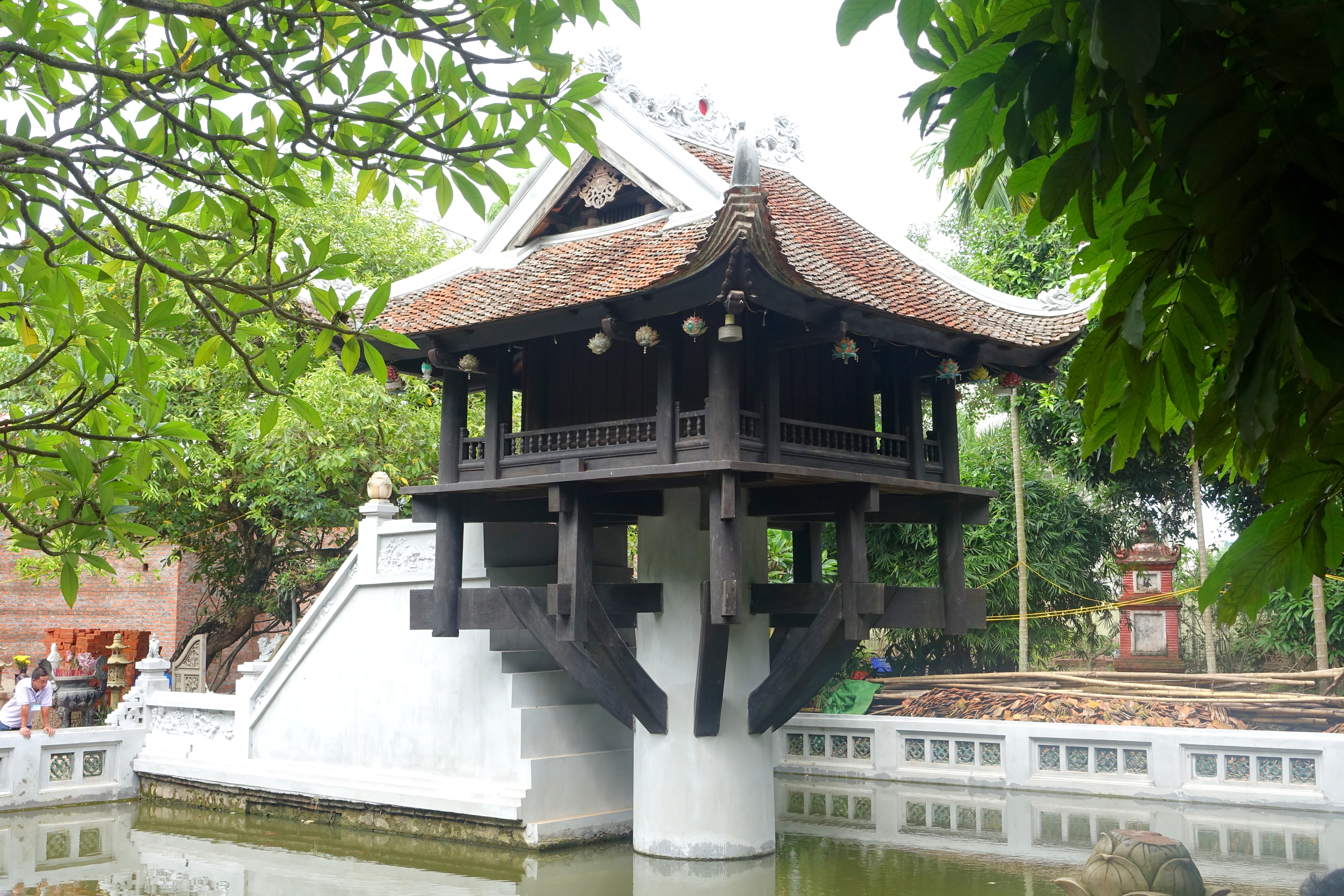
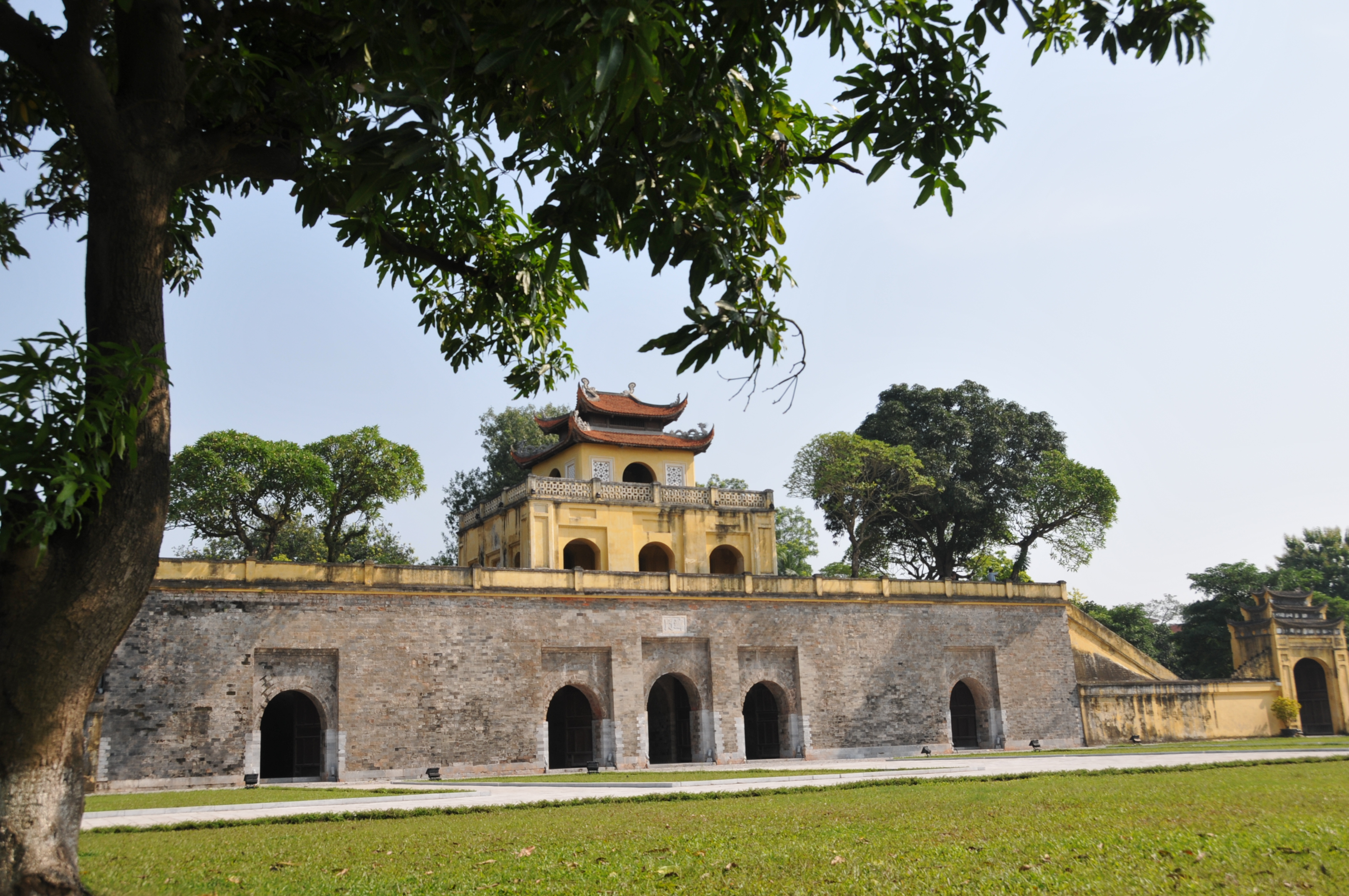
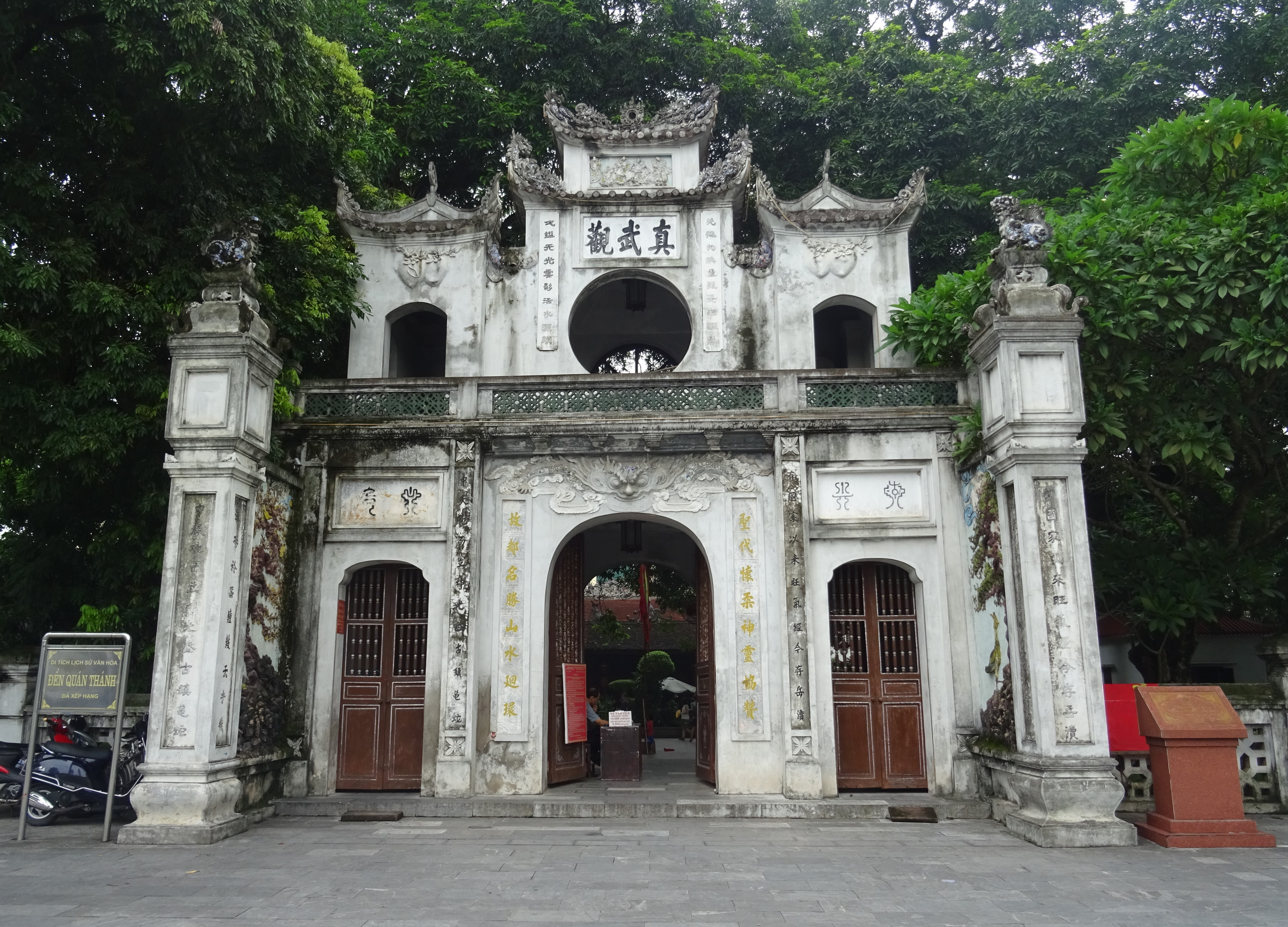
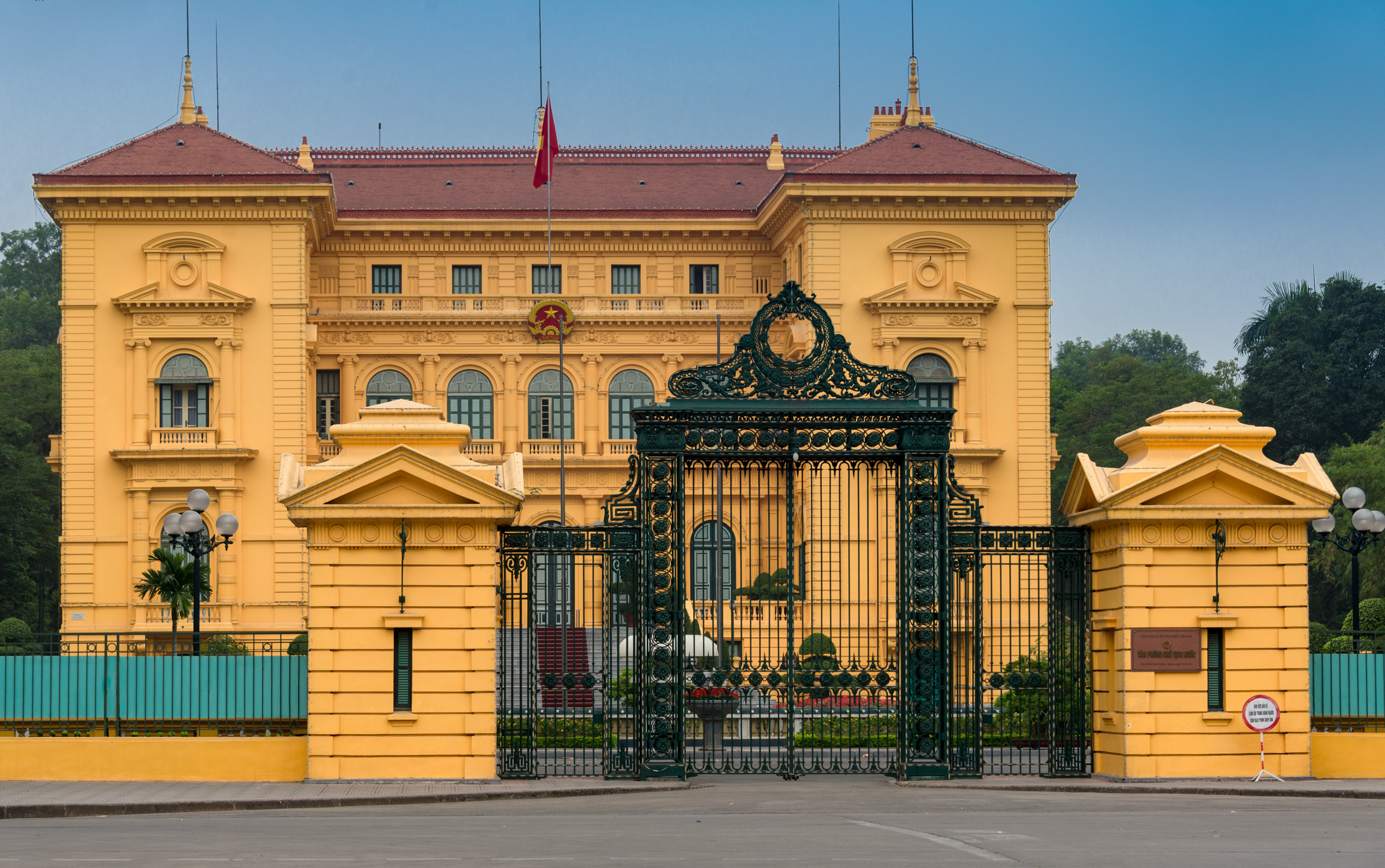
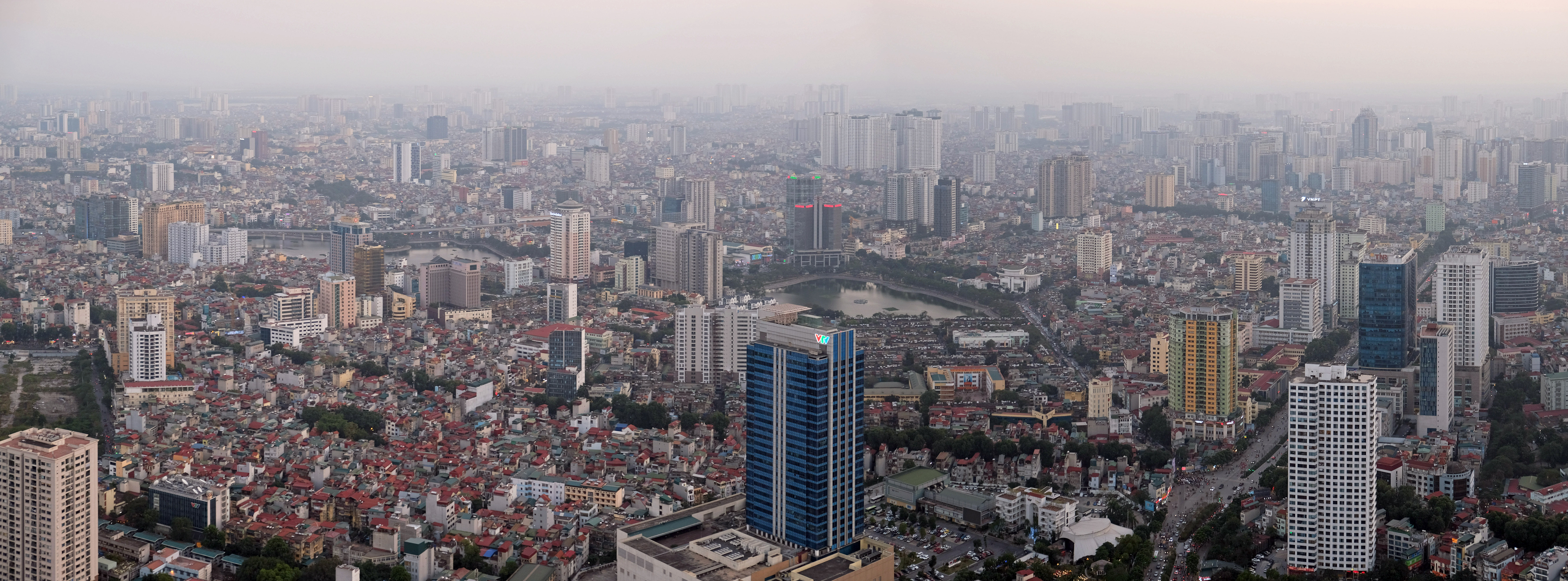
- One Pillar Pagoda Imperial Citadel of Thăng Long Quán Thánh Temple Presidential Palace Ho Chi Minh Mausoleum Panoramic view from Lotte Center Hanoi
- Interactive map of Ba Dinh district
- Country: Vietnam
- Region: Red River Delta
- Province: Hanoi
- Liberation of Hanoi: 1954
- Urban district establishment: 1981
- Wards: 14 wards

Government
  - Type: District-level government
  - People's Committee President: Tạ Nam Chiến
  - People's Council President: Nguyễn Công Thành
  - District's Committee Secretary: Hoàng Minh Dũng Tiến

Area
  - Total: 9.21 km^{2} (3.56 sq mi)

Population (2019)
  - Total: 221,893
  - Density: 24,100/km^{2} (62,400/sq mi)

GRDP (2023)
  - Non-governmental: 96,600 billion VND, US$4.03 billion (Note: Assuming average conversion rate of 24,000 VND = 1 USD in 2023)
- Time zone: UTC+7 (ICT)
- Postal code in Vietnam: 111xx
- Area code: 24
- Website: badinh.hanoi.gov.vn

Ba Đình is one of the four original urban districts (quận) of Hanoi, the capital city of Vietnam. The district currently has 14 wards, covering a total area of 9.21 square kilometres (3.56 sq mi). As of 2019, there were 221,893 people residing in the district, the population density is 24,000 inhabitants per square kilometer.

Ba Đình district has a large number of monuments, landmarks and relics, including Ho Chi Minh Mausoleum, One Pillar Pagoda, Flag Tower of Hanoi and Imperial Citadel of Thăng Long, a UNESCO World Heritage Site.

Ba Đình is the political center of Vietnam. Most of the government offices and embassies are located here including the most important sites of the Vietnamese state such as the Ba Đình Square, the Presidential Palace, the National Assembly Building, the Government Office and the Communist Party of Vietnam central headquarters. It was formerly called the "French Quarter" (Khu phố Pháp) because of a high concentration of French-styled villas and government buildings built when Hanoi was the capital of French Indochina. This name is still used in travel literature. The southern half of Hoàn Kiếm district is also called the "French Quarter", also because of numerous French-styled buildings, most of which are now used as foreign embassies.

The wreckage of a B-52 bomber shot down during the Vietnam War can be seen in Hữu Tiệp Lake in the Ngọc Hà neighborhood.

== History ==
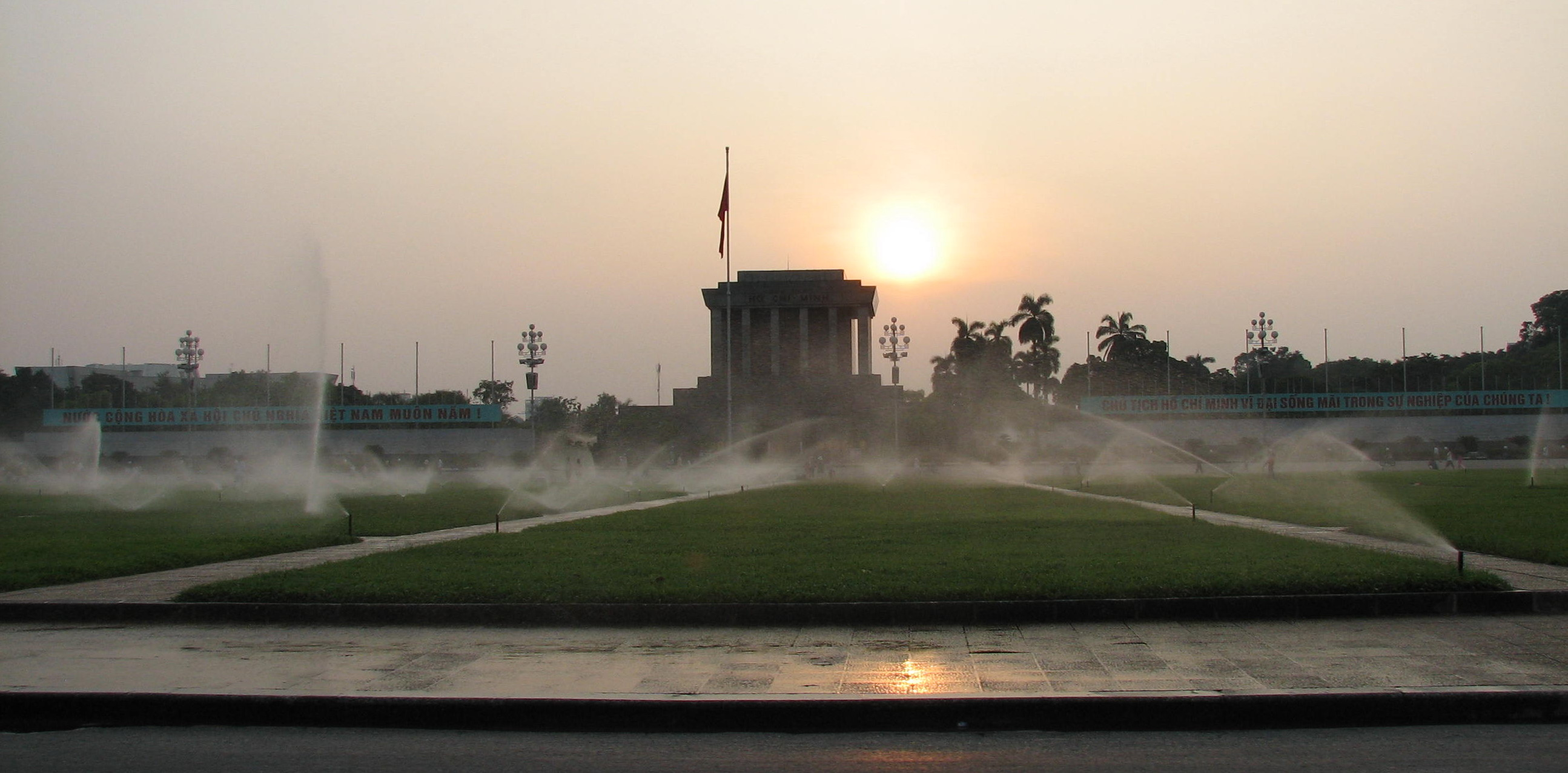
Ba Đình Square

One of the oldest remaining structures in the neighborhood is the One Pillar Pagoda, built under the Lý dynasty. In 1901, the Presidential Palace was built. On September 2, 1945, Ho Chi Minh read the Declaration of Independence at Ba Dinh Square to approximately 500,000 people. Following his death in 1969, the preserved body of Ho Chi Minh was put on display in the Hồ Chí Minh Mausoleum, located in Ba Dinh Square, in 1975.

== Location ==
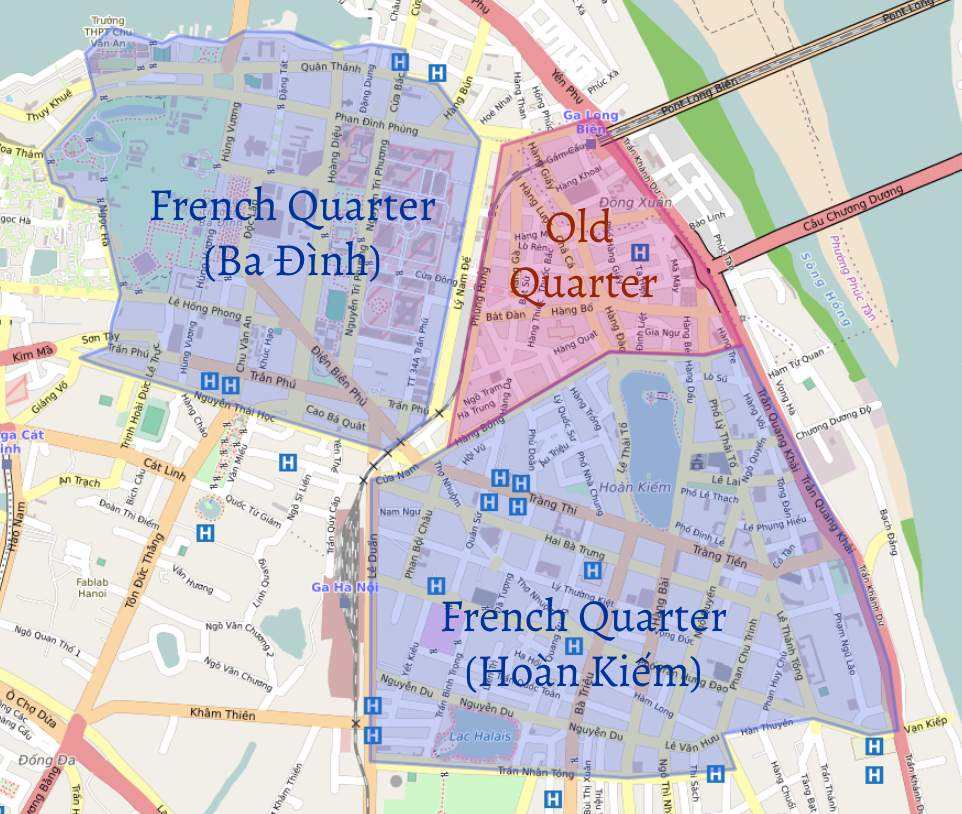
Approximation of Hanoi's Old Quarter and French Quarters

Ba Đình is located at 21° 2′ 12″ N, 105° 50′ 10″ E, in the center of Hanoi. It's surrounded to the north by Tây Hồ, to the east by the Red River, to the south by Đống Đa, to the southeast by Hoàn Kiếm and to the west by Cầu Giấy.

== Administrative divisions ==
The district contains 14 wards (phường)

- Cống Vị
- Điện Biên
- Đội Cấn
- Giảng Võ
- Kim Mã
- Liễu Giai
- Ngọc Hà
- Ngọc Khánh
- Nguyễn Trung Trực
- Phúc Xá
- Quán Thánh
- Thành Công
- Trúc Bạch
- Vĩnh Phúc

== Education ==
International schools:

- Hanoi International School
- Singapore International School (SIS), Vạn Phúc in the Vạn Phúc Diplomatic Compound

== Gallery ==
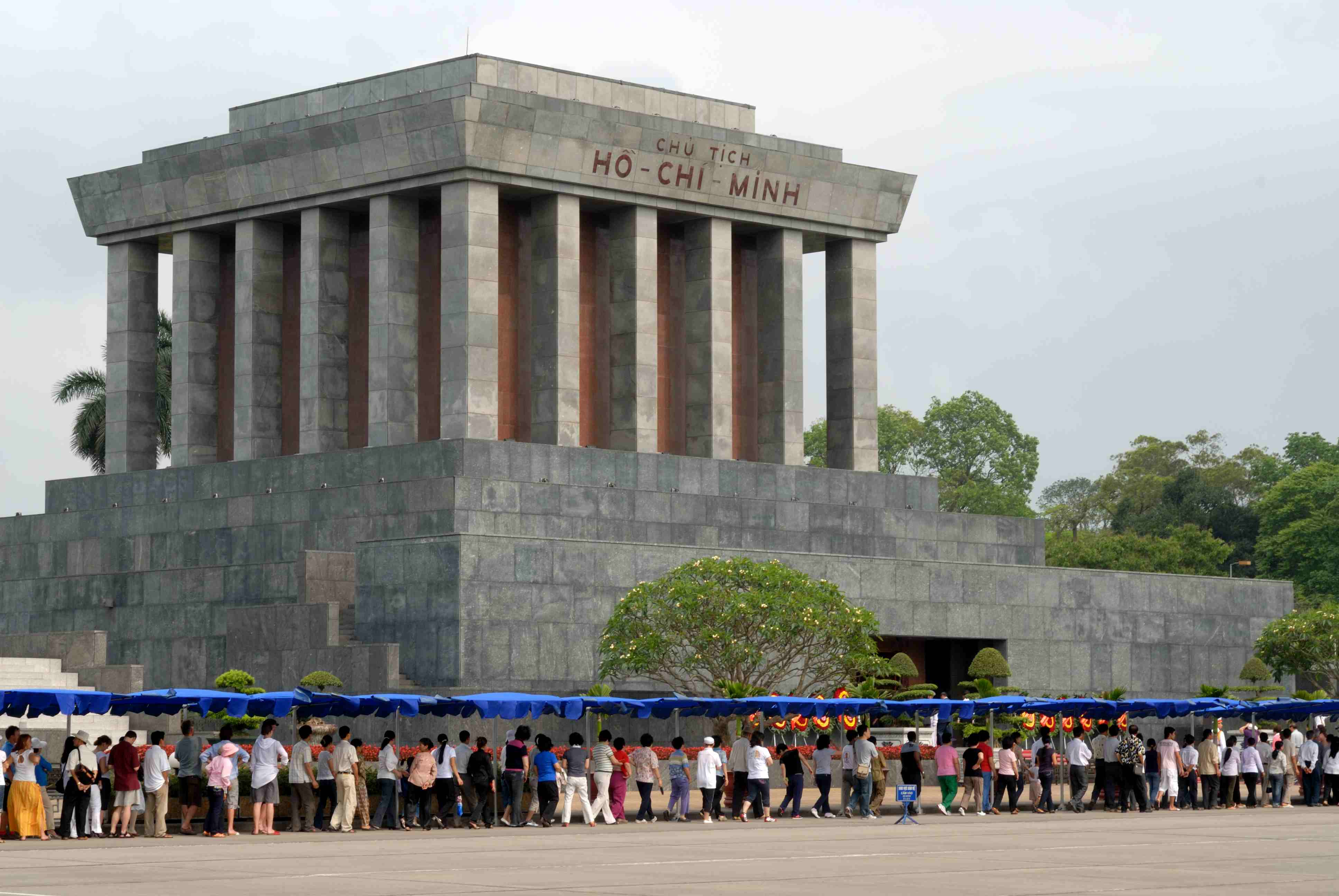
Hồ Chí Minh Mausoleum

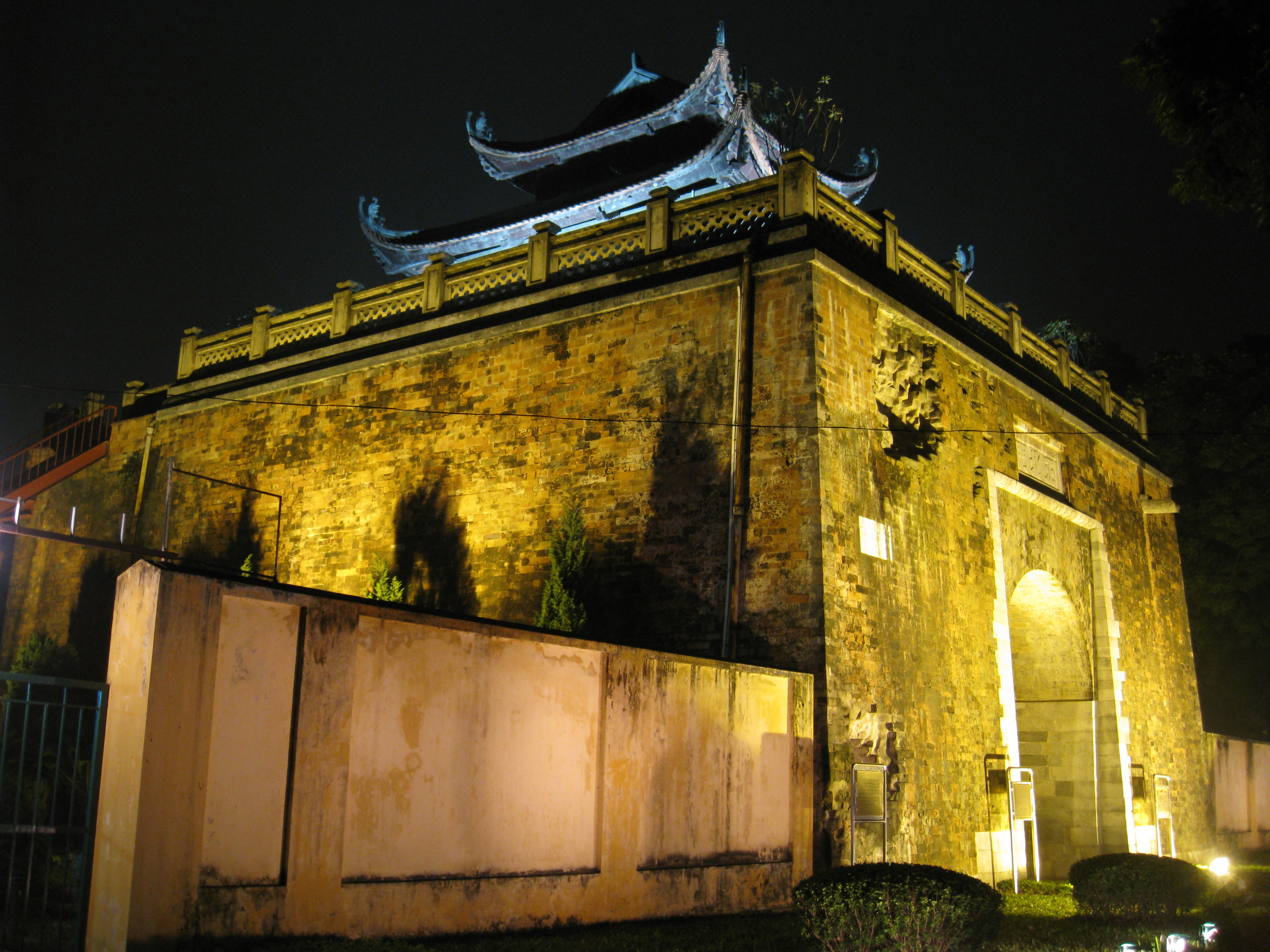
Thăng Long Citadel

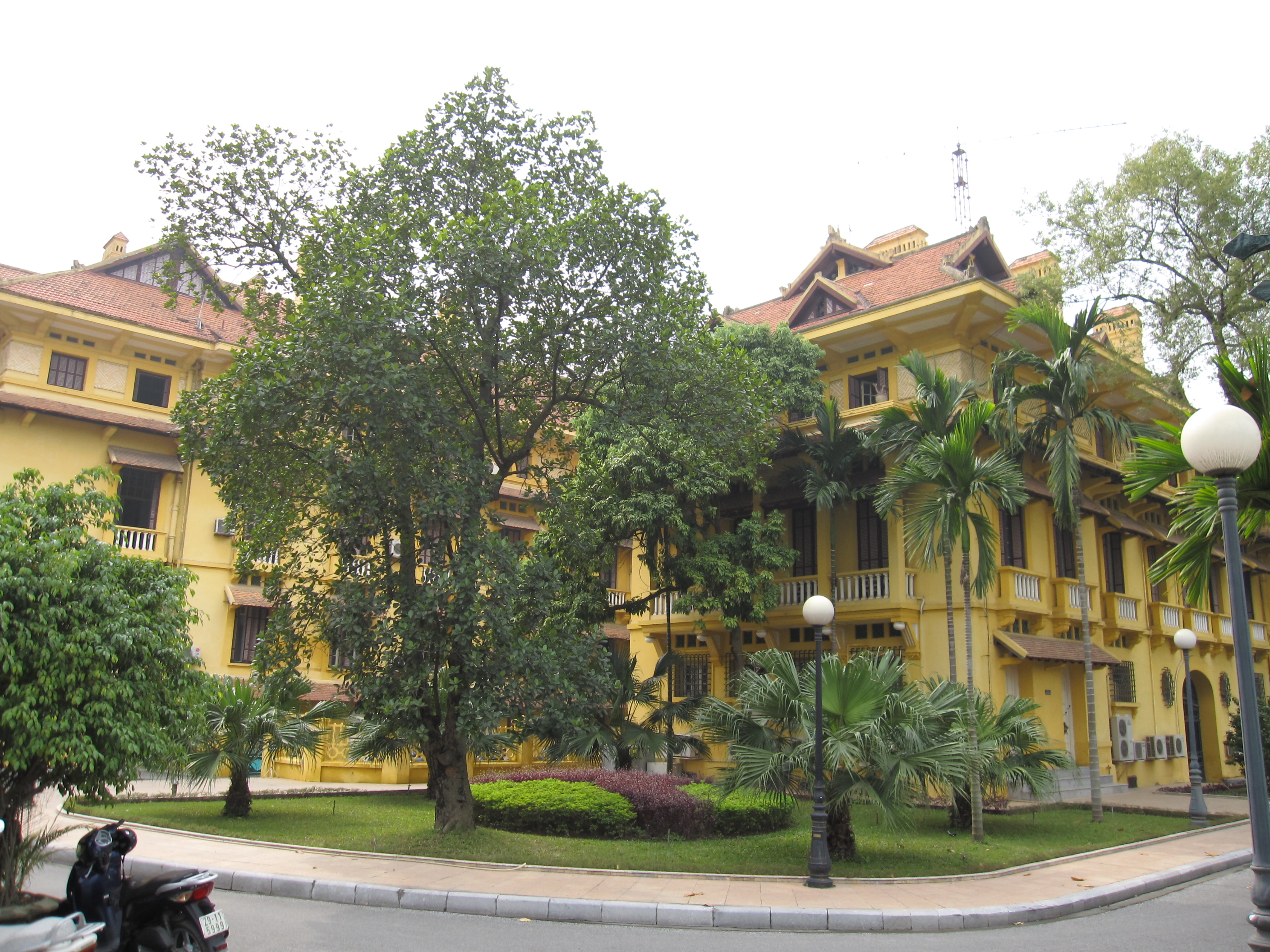
Ministry of Foreign Affairs building

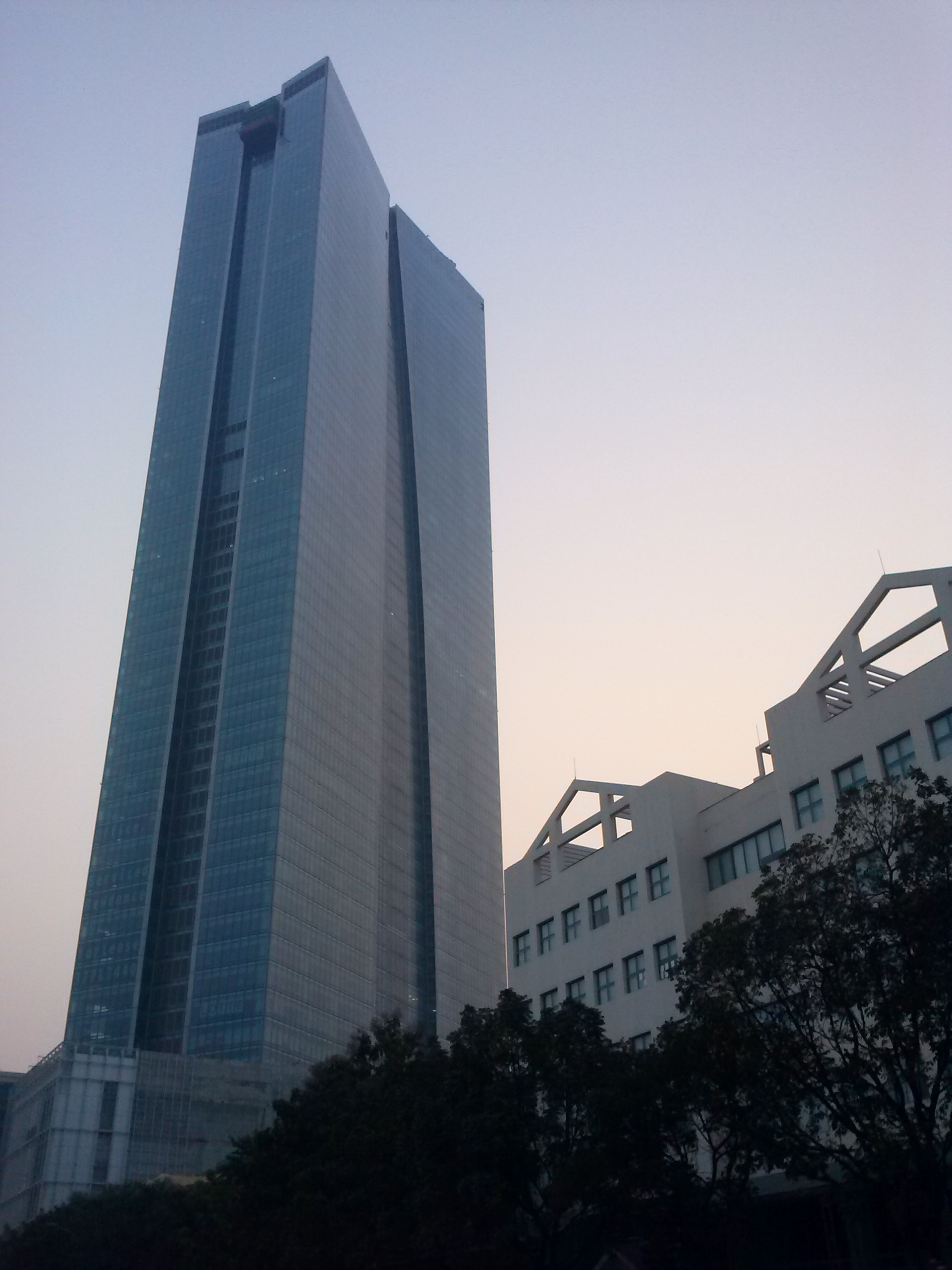
Lotte Center Hanoi in Cống Vị ward, western Ba Đình

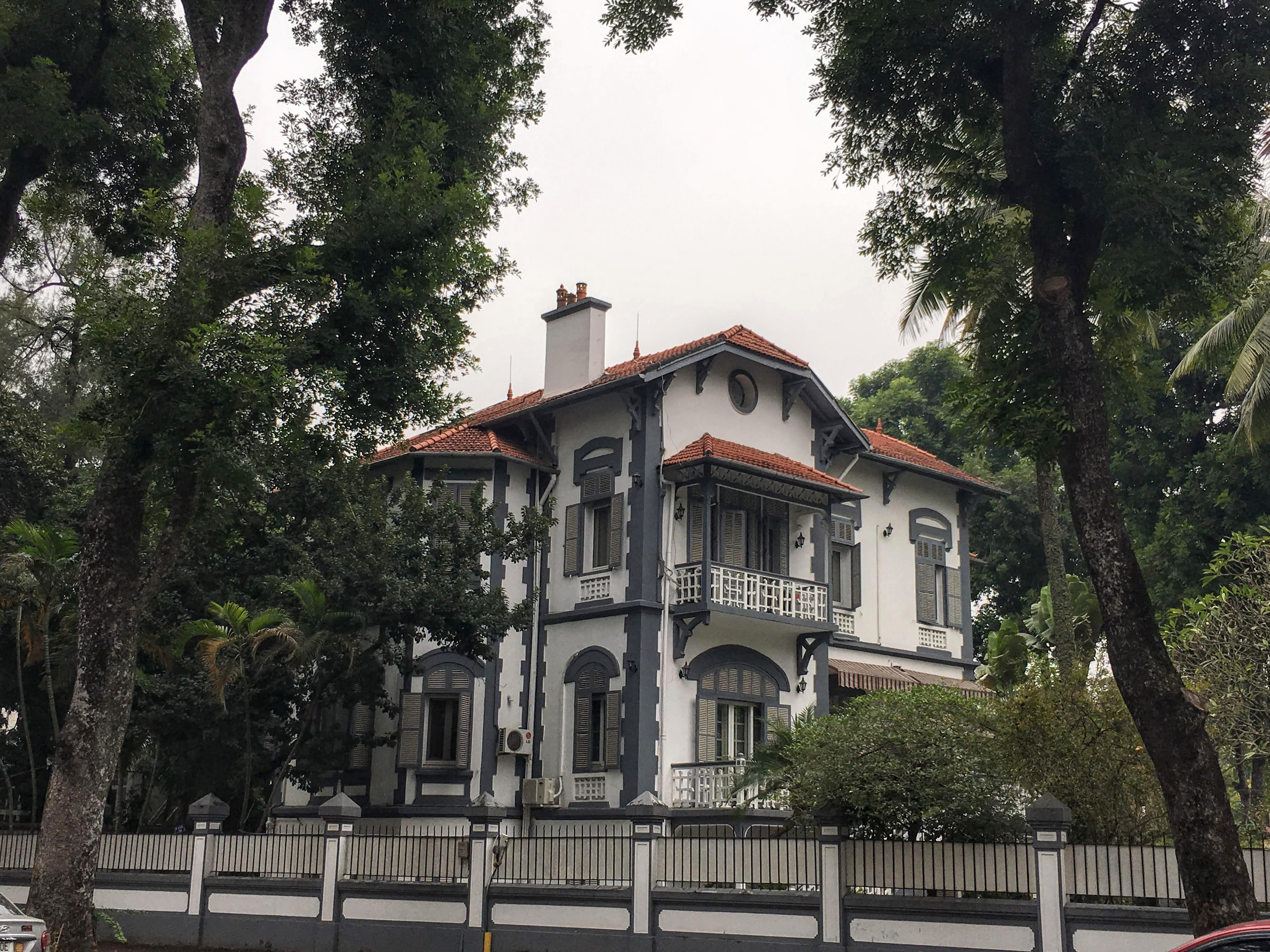
A French Colonial villa in Ba Đình
