= Ilya Zbarsky =

- Born: Ilya Borisovich Zbarsky; 8 November 1913; Kamianets-Podilskyi, Podolian Governorate, Russian Empire
- Died: 9 November 2007 (aged 94); Moscow, Russia
- Education: Doctor of Science Academician of the USSR Academy of Medical Sciences Professor
- Alma mater: Moscow State University (1935)
- Known for: head of Lenin's Mausoleum
- Scientific career
- Fields: Biochemistry
- Workplaces: First Moscow State Medical University; Lenin's Mausoleum

Ilya Borisovich Zbarsky (Russian: Илья Борисович Збарский; 8 November 1913 – 9 November 2007) was a Soviet and Russian biochemist who served as the head of Lenin's Mausoleum from 1956 to 1989. He was appointed as Advisor at the Direction of the Institute in 1989 due to his age. He was the son of Boris Zbarsky, who helped mummify Lenin's body in 1924. Zbarsky was a member of the Russian Academy of Medical Sciences.

With Samuel Hutchinson, he was the author of the book Lenin's Embalmers.

He died on 9 November 2007, in Moscow.

== References and sources ==
- Ilya Borisovich Zbarsky biography
