= Declaration of independence of the Democratic Republic of Vietnam =

1945 document by Hồ Chí Minh

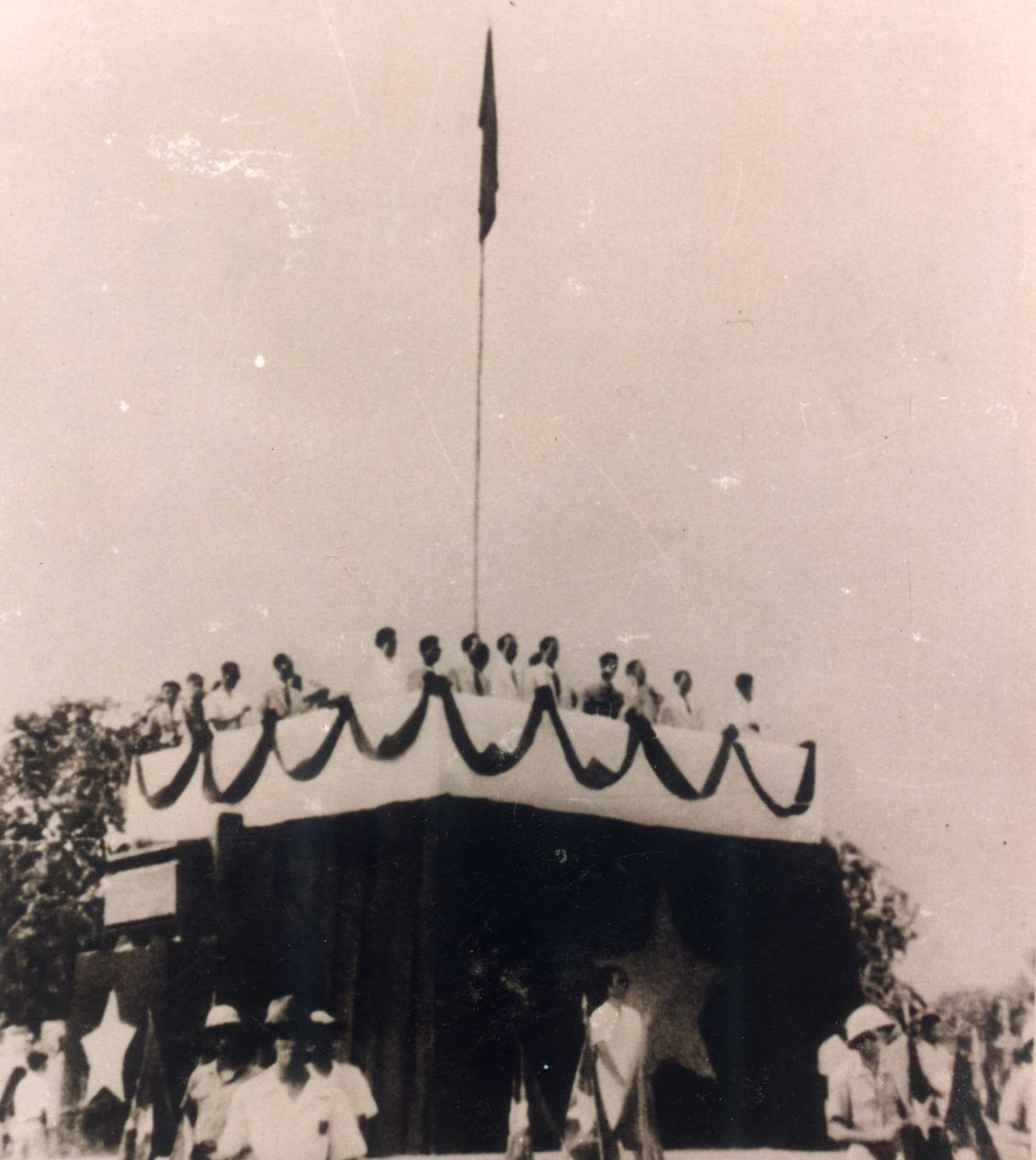
- The Declaration of Independence ceremony proclaiming the establishment of the Democratic Republic of Vietnam took place at Ba Đình Square.
- Ratified: September 2, 1945; 81 years ago
- Author: Ho Chi Minh
- Signatories: Ho Chi Minh and 14 others
- Purpose: To announce the establishment of the Democratic Republic of Vietnam

Post-1954 recreation of Ho Chi Minh reading the declaration of independence

The Declaration of independence of the Democratic Republic of Vietnam (Vietnamese: Tuyên ngôn độc lập Việt Nam Dân chủ Cộng hòa) was written by Hồ Chí Minh and announced to the public at Ba Đình Square in Hanoi on 2 September 1945. It led to the foundation of the Democratic Republic of Vietnam (DRV), replacing the Empire of Vietnam under the Nguyễn dynasty and Emperor Bảo Đại, who abdicated on 25 August.

For the next five years, the declaration had yet to be recognized by any foreign country. Vietnamese anti-commmunist nationalists and France would eventually establish the State of Vietnam within the French Union in 1949, as an alternative to the communist-led DRV.

The 1945 declaration is now regarded as the foundation of the unified Socialist Republic of Vietnam, which succeeded the DRV on 2 July 1976.

== History ==
Vietnam, under the Nguyễn dynasty, became two protectorates of France in 1883, but during World War II, Japan occupied the country from 1940. During this period, Ho Chi Minh created the Viet Minh in 1941 to coordinate resistance against both French colonial authorities and Imperial Japanese occupying forces. This group fought a guerrilla war against the Japanese and were to a degree supported by the Americans in 1945 via the Office of Strategic Services. In March 1945, Japan overthrew French colonial administration in Indochina, ending more than six decades of French rule over all of Vietnam.

On August 22, 1945, the OSS agent Archimedes Patti, who had met Ho Chi Minh in southern China, arrived in Hanoi on a mercy mission to liberate allied POWs and was accompanied by Jean Sainteny a French government official. The Japanese forces informally surrendered (the official surrender took place on September 2, 1945 in Tokyo Bay) but the only force capable of maintaining law and order was the Imperial Japanese Army, and so remained in power and kept French colonial troops detained.

Japanese armed forces allowed the Việt Minh and other nationalist groups to take over public buildings and weapons without resistance, which began the August Revolution against the Nguyễn dynasty and its Empire of Vietnam, a Japanese-sponsored state established right after Japan overthrew the French. On the morning of August 26, 1945, at No. 48 Hàng Ngang, Hà Nội, Hồ Chí Minh presided over a meeting of the Communist Party of Vietnam, which he had called. The meeting unanimously decided to prepare to proclaim independence and to organize a large meeting in Hà Nội for the Provisional Government to present itself to the people.

On August 30, 1945, Hồ Chí Minh invited several people to contribute their ideas toward his Declaration of Independence, including a number of American OSS officers. OSS officers met repeatedly with him and other Viet Minh officers during late August, and Patti claimed to have listened to Ho read to him a draft of the Declaration, which he believed sounded very similar to the United States Declaration of Independence.

The signatories of the declaration were Ho Chi Minh (president), Trần Huy Liệu, Võ Nguyên Giáp, Chu Văn Tấn, Dương Đức Hiền, Nguyễn Văn Tố, Nguyễn Mạnh Hà, Cù Huy Cận, Phạm Ngọc Thạch, Nguyễn Văn Xuân, Vũ Trọng Khánh, Phạm Văn Đồng, Đào Trọng Kim, Vũ Đình Hòe, and Lê Văn Hiến.

On 2 September 1945, Ho Chi Minh read the Declaration of Independence during a public meeting in front of thousands of people at what is now Ba Đình Square. He announced the birth of the Democratic Republic of Vietnam (DRV) as an independent republic. After reading the declaration, Ho Chi Minh stood up, grabbed the jade-encrusted silver "Sword of the State", and walked over to the microphone. He pulled the blade out of its sheath, raised it as high as he could reach, and loudly declared: "This sword is meant to behead traitors."

According to historian Pierre Asselin, the references to the United States Declaration of Independence and the French Declaration of the Rights of Man and of the Citizen were a strategic move to win Allied support, including OSS representatives present. They were intended to conceal Hồ's ties to international communism while suggesting that the new Vietnamese government intended to maintain connections with the United States, France, and other Western countries, although in reality he had no such intention and sought an alliance with the Soviet Union. Under the 1946 Ho–Sainteny Agreement, France recognized the DRV as a free state within the French Union, but not as a fully independent or unified nation. The First Indochina War broke out in December 1946 between France and the DRV. The anti-communist State of Vietnam was established by Vietnamese nationalists and the French in June 1949.

== Contents of the declaration ==
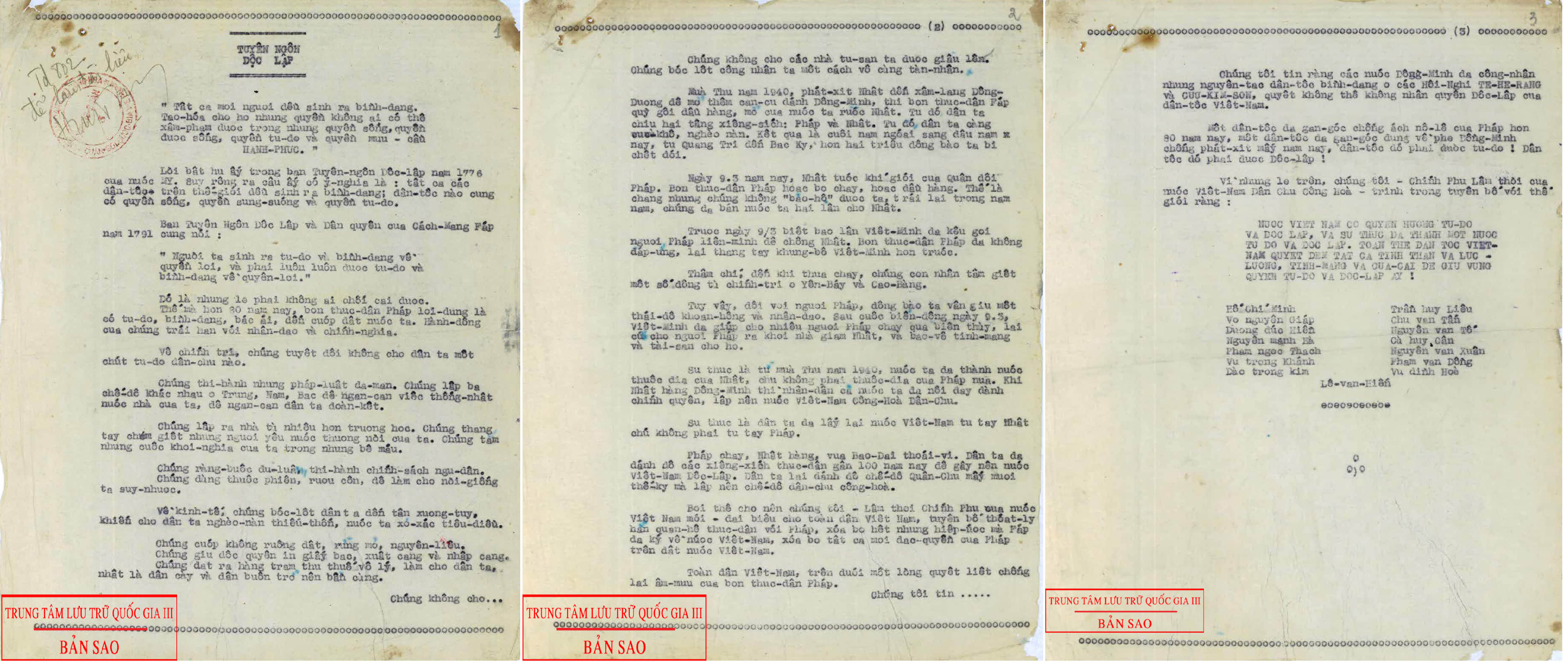
A copy of the declaration of independence of the Democratic Republic of Vietnam.

The manifesto consists of three parts:

- Part 1: The legal basis of the declaration.
- Part 2: The practical basis of the declaration.
- Part 3: Declaration of Independence.

...For these reasons, we, the Provisional Government of the Democratic Republic of Vietnam, solemnly declare to the world that: Vietnam has the right to freedom and independence, and in fact has become a free and independent nation. The entire Vietnamese people are determined to dedicate all their spirit and strength, lives and property, to upholding that right to freedom and independence!

The signatories include: Hồ Chí Minh (chairperson), Trần Huy Liệu, Võ Nguyên Giáp, Chu Văn Tấn, Dương Đức Hiền, Nguyễn Văn Tố, Nguyễn Mạnh Hà, Cù Huy Cận, Phạm Ngọc Thạch, Nguyễn Văn Xuân, Vũ Trọng Khánh, Phạm Văn Đồng, Đào Trọng Kim, Vũ Đình Hòe, Lê Văn Hiến.

== Meaning ==
From a "political" perspective, the Declaration of Independence of the Democratic Republic of Vietnam played a crucial role in modern Vietnamese history. It symbolized the end of foreign rule in Vietnam. The declaration presented readers and listeners with a dramatic worldview, a condensed history, bold assertions, vivid phrases, and emotionally charged imagery. The Declaration of Independence highlighted the values of equality among nations, the fundamental rights of human beings and peoples, the right to national self-determination, and the right to independence and self-governance for each nation. The Declaration denounced and condemned the barbaric crimes of French colonialism against the Vietnamese people in political, economic, and cultural aspects. At the same time, it affirmed that Vietnam – a country belonging to the Allied forces in World War II – had gained independence after defeating the Japanese Empire/Fascist Japan. Prior to this, the French had twice granted representation and protection over Vietnam to the Japanese Fascists, thus France was no longer qualified to represent the Vietnamese people. The Declaration of Independence also affirmed to the world the legal basis for the Vietnamese people's right to freedom and independence, while also outlining the practical basis that Vietnam was already a free and independent country, not dependent on any other nation. At the same time, the Declaration also affirmed that the Vietnamese people would maintain their newly won independence and self-determination at all costs. According to historian David G. Marr, the Declaration of Independence demonstrated Hanoi's diplomatic respect for Paris and Washington when President Ho Chi Minh quoted the American Declaration of Independence (1776) and the French Declaration of Human Rights and Citizen Rights (1791). This created a contrast between the ideals that France and America were still advocating and the painful reality of 80 years of French rule in Vietnam. According to historian Pierre Asselin, invoking the American "Declaration of Independence" and the French "Declaration of Human Rights and Citizen Rights" was a strategic move to garner support from the Allies, including the OSS. This was intended to conceal Ho's connection to international communism, while simultaneously implying that the new Vietnamese government intended to maintain relations with the United States, France, and other Western countries, even though he did not have such intentions and instead sought an alliance with the Soviet Union.
