= Timeline of Hanoi =

History of Hanoi

The following is a timeline of the history of Hanoi, the capital city of Vietnam:

== Prehistory ==
- c. 1000 BCE — The Bronze-Age Dong Son culture of the Lac people occupies the Red River valley

== Van Lang ==
- c. 300 BCE — According to much later sources, the area of present-day Hanoi formed part of the Giao Chỉ region of Van Lang
- c. 258 BCE — The Âu Việt, united under the Shu emigrant Shu Pan (Thục Phán), invade and conquer Van Lang

== Au Lac ==
- c. 257 BCE — Co Loa established by Shu Pan in the present city's Đông Anh district to serve as the capital of the unified kingdom of Âu Lạc

== Qin Empire ==
- 214 BCE — The First Emperor begins his campaign against the Baiyue (Bách Việt) people of the south
- 208 BCE — General Zhao Tuo (Triệu Đà) defeats Shu Pan and takes Co Loa, incorporating it into his Nanhai Commandery

== Nanyue ==
- 204 BCE — Zhao Tuo declares his realm the independent kingdom of Nanyue (Nam Việt)
- 196 BCE — Lu Jia secures the nominal submission of Nanyue to Han
- 179 BCE — By this point, Nanyue's lands in the Red River valley have been organized as the commandery of Jiaozhi (Giao Chỉ)

== Han Empire ==
- 111 BCE — The commander of Jiaozhi submits to Han following Lu Bode's razing of the capital Panyu, remaining in his post and beginning the "First Era of Northern Domination" of Vietnam.
- 208 CE — Longbian (Long Biên) erected in its eponymous district
- 226 — A Roman embassy arrives

== Jin dynasty ==
- 271 CE —Jiao Province Campaign between Eastern Wu and the Jin dynasty
- 399 CE —Longbian came under siege from Champa army led by king Bhadravarman I. He had killed two Chinese governors, Gun Yuan and Cao Ping, while inciting locals to revolt against the Chinese. The siege was relieved later by Chinese reinforcement under the command of Jiaozhou governor Du Yian.

== Liu Song Empire ==
- 454 x 464 — Songping (Tống Bình) established by the Liu Song on the south bank of the Red River in Hanoi's Từ Liêm district and Hoài Đức district

== Van Xuan ==
- 544 — Long Biên serves as the capital of Ly Bi's realm of Van Xuan

== Tang Empire ==
- 621 — Long Biên and Songping briefly elevated to prefectural status as Longzhou and Songzhou
- 722 — Songping falls to Mai Thúc Loan
- late 8th century — Zhang Boyi erects Luocheng (La Thành, "Enclosing Wall[ed City]") in the present city's Ba Đình district
- early 9th century — Luocheng renamed Jincheng (Kim Thành, "Golden Wall[ed City]")
- 863 —Nanzhao captured Hanoi from the Tang dynasty
- 866 — Gao Pian, the local jiedushi, expands the fortress at Jincheng and renames it Da Luocheng (Đại La Thành, "Big Enclosing Wall[ed City]")

== Dai Viet ==
- 1010 — Luocheng renamed Thang Long with the erection of its Imperial Citadel and dedication as the capital of the Lý dynasty.
- Quán Thánh Temple built.
- 1049 — One Pillar Pagoda built.
- 1070 — Temple of Literature built.
- 1076 — Guozijian established.
- 1225 — City becomes capital of the Trần dynasty.
- 1258, 1285 and 1288 — the city had been sacked and burned by Mongol. All previous constructions were destroyed as the city was rebuilt later.
- 15th century — Quán Sứ Pagoda built.
- 1408 — City renamed Dōngguān (Chinese: 東關), "Eastern Gateway"; Đông Quan in Vietnamese) by the Chinese Ming dynasty.
- 1428 — City renamed Đông Kinh (Chinese: 東京), as known by Westerners as Tonkin.
- 1573 — "Foggy Lake" renamed West Lake.
- 1615 — Trấn Quốc Pagoda relocated to West Lake.
- 1656 — Láng Temple renovated.
- 1686 — Hương Temple expanded.
- 1730s — Trúc Lâm Palace built at Trúc Bạch Lake.
- 1802 — Vietnamese capital relocated to Huế. Most royal palaces were destroyed during the previous Tay Son rebellion (1771—1789).
- 1812 — Flag Tower built.
- 1831 — City renamed Hà Nội (河内, "Between Rivers" or "River Interior") by Nguyễn emperor Minh Mạng.
- 19th century — Ngọc Sơn Temple built.

== French occupation (19th-20th c.) ==
- 1873 — November 20: Francis Garnier of France takes citadel.
- 1874 — March 15: French concession granted per treaty.
- 1882 — French occupation begins.
- 1883
  - May 19: Battle of Cầu Giấy (Paper Bridge) fought near city.
  - August 15: Battle of Phủ Hoài fought near city.
- 1884 — L'Avenir du Tonkin French newspaper begins publication.
- 1886
  - Kinh Thien Palace built.
  - Turtle Tower built in Hoàn Kiếm Lake.
- 1887 — Banque de l'Indochine branch opens.
- 1888 — St. Joseph's Cathedral built.
- 1889 — City area expanded with land from Tho Xuong and Vinh Thuan districts.
- 1890
  - Steamboat begins operating on the Red River.
  - Racecourse opens.
- 1894 — Lanessan Hospital built for French military.
- 1898
  - Hỏa Lò Prison built.
  - Geological Museum established.
- 1900 — French School of the Far East headquartered in Hanoi.
- 1902
  - City becomes capital of French Indochina.
  - Hanoi railway station opens.
  - Indochina Medical College founded.
  - Indo China Exposition Française et Internationale (world's fair) held.
  - Population: 150,000.
- 1903 — Long Biên Bridge constructed.
- 1906
  - Presidential Palace built.
  - University of Indochina established.
- 1908 — Collège du Protectorat established.
- 1910
  - Phùng Khoang Church built.
  - Museum of archaeology and ethnology organized.
- 1911 — Hanoi Opera House built.
- 1917
  - Indochinese Central Archives set up.
  - Bach Mai Airfield constructed.
- 1919 — Lycée Albert Sarraut and Bibliothèque Centrale Hanoi established.
- 1925 — Ecole des Beaux-arts d'Indochine opens.
- 1926 — Musee Louis Finot established.
- 1929 — March: Vietnamese Communist Party organized on Ham Long Street.
- 1930
  - Provisional Vietnamese Communist Party headquartered on Tho Nhuom Street.
  - Đồng tử quân youth scouting group formed.
- 1932 — Cửa Bắc Church built.
- 1934 — Hàm Long Church built.
- 1936
  - Gia Lam Airfield constructed.
  - Indochina Communist Party headquartered on Phung Hung Street.

== Japanese occupation ==
- 1941 — December 7: Japanese occupation begins.
- 1942 — Hoan Long District (now Ba Đình district) becomes part of city.

== French reoccupation ==
- 1945
  - Japanese occupation ends.
  - September 2: Ho Chi Minh reads the Proclamation of Independence of the Democratic Republic of Vietnam in Ba Đình Square.
  - Vietnam National University and National Library of Vietnam established.
  - September 7: Voice of Vietnam begins broadcasting.
  - Tran Van Lai becomes mayor.
- 1946
  - March 2: National Assembly meets in the Great Theatre.
  - December 19: Battle of Hanoi begins.
- 1947 — February 17: Battle of Hanoi ends; French in power.
- 1951 — October 11: Hanoi National University of Education established.

== Democratic Republic of Vietnam ==
- 1954
  - City becomes capital of independent North Vietnam.
  - People's Open Air Theatre active.
  - Hanoi Radio begins broadcasting.
- 1955 — College of Foreign Languages founded.
- 1956 — Vietnam School of Music, University of Agriculture and Forestry, and Hanoi University of Science and Technology established.
- 1958
  - September: Vietnam National Museum of History established.
  - Thanh Niên Road constructed between Trúc Bạch Lake and West Lake.
- 1959
  - Vietnam Museum of Revolution, Hanoi University of Foreign Studies, and Electricity Water Resources Academy established.
  - Vietnam Military History Museum inaugurated.
- 1960
  - Foreign Trade University and Roman Catholic Archdiocese of Hanoi established.
  - Population: 414,620 city; 643,576 urban agglomeration.
- 1961
  - Cultural College of Hanoi established.
  - School of Public Administration in operation.
- 1962 — National Archives Center #1 established.
- 1965 — Residents begin evacuating city on threat of airstrikes by United States forces.
- 1966
  - June 29: Aerial bombing outside city by United States forces.
  - Vietnam National Museum of Fine Arts inaugurated.
  - Le Quy Don Technical University established.
- 1967
  - Aerial bombing by U.S.; air battles between U.S. and North Vietnamese forces.
  - D67 underground command bunker installed at Kinh Thien Palace.
- 1968 — Hànội mói newspaper in publication.
- 1969 — Hanoi Architectural University and Foreign Language Specialized School established.
- 1970 — September 7: Vietnam Television begins broadcasting.
- 1972
  - April: Bombing by United States forces.
  - December: Aerial bombing by United States forces.
- 1974 — Central Secondary School of Archives and Office Skills established.
- 1975 — Ho Chi Minh Mausoleum inaugurated.
- 1976 — City becomes capital of Socialist Republic of Vietnam.
- 1978 — Noi Bai International Airport opens.
- 1979 — Population: 879,500.
- 1980 — Hanoi Institute of Theatre and Cinema founded.
- 1984 — Vietnam National Symphony Orchestra revived.
- 1985
  - Chương Dương Bridge built.
  - Hanoi – Amsterdam High School established.
- 1988 — Vietnam-Russia Tropical Centre headquartered in Hanoi.
- 1989 — Population: 1,089,760 city; 3,056,146 urban agglomeration.
- 1990 — Ho Chi Minh Museum established.
- 1992 — Population: 1,073,760.
- 1993
  - Vietnam War Memorial erected.
  - Hanoi University of Science in operation.
  - Mai art gallery opens.
- 1995
  - Institut de la Francophonie pour l'Informatique founded.
  - Vietnamese Women's Museum dedicated.
- 1997
  - Vietnam Museum of Ethnology opens.
  - November: Organisation internationale de la Francophonie summit held.
- 1998
  - March 24: Turtle sighting in Hoàn Kiếm Lake.
  - Hàng Đẫy Stadium opens.
  - Hanoi Garden opens.
- 1999 — Population: 1,523,936.

== 21st century ==
- 2000 — November: President of the United States, Bill Clinton, made historic visit to Vietnam. He was the first U.S. leader ever to officially visit Hanoi.
- 2001 — Trang Tien Plaza (shopping center) in business.
- 2002 — National Archives Center #3 opens.
- 2003
  - Mỹ Đình National Stadium opens in Từ Liêm District.
  - Green Tangerine restaurant opens in the Old Quarter.
  - November: City hosts meeting of Asian Network of Major Cities 21.
- 2005 — Hanoi Securities Trading Center launched.
- 2006
  - Vietnam National Convention Center built in Từ Liêm District.
  - FPT University established.
  - November: Asia-Pacific Economic Cooperation meeting held.
- 2008
  - Hanoi Capital Region created to include 29 districts; population expands to 6,232,940.
  - Thanh Trì Bridge and Vĩnh Tuy Bridge constructed.
  - Ba Đình Hall demolished.
- 2009 — October–November: 2009 Asian Indoor Games held.
- 2010
  - July: 2010 Asian Junior Athletics Championships held.
  - October: Millennial Anniversary of Hanoi.
  - Hanoi Museum opens.
- 2011 — Keangnam Hanoi Landmark Tower built.
- 2019 — 2019 North Korea–United States Hanoi Summit
- 2021 — Hanoi Metro opens.
- 2023 — September: Hanoi building fire

== See also ==
- Hanoi history
- Districts of Hanoi
- List of Buddhist temples in Hanoi
- List of historical capitals of Vietnam
- Television and mass media in Vietnam

== Bibliography ==
- Vann, Michael G. (2018). The Great Hanoi Rat Hunt: Empire, Disease, and Modernity in French Colonial Vietnam. New York: Oxford University Press.
- "Hanoi". The Chronicle & Directory for China, Corea, Japan, the Philippines, Indo-China, Straits Settlements, Siam, Borneo, Malay States, &c. Hong Kong: Daily Press. 1892.
- Henri d'Orléans (1894), "(Hanoi)", Around Tonkin and Siam, London: Chapman & Hall, OCLC 9889459
- Schafer, Edward Hetzel (1967), The Vermilion Bird: T'ang Images of the South, Berkeley: University of California Press, ISBN 978-0-520-05463-9.
- William S. Turley (1975). "Urbanization in War: Hanoi, 1946-1973". Pacific Affairs. 48.
- William S. Logan (1995). "Russians on the Red River: The Soviet Impact on Hanoi's Townscape, 1955-90". Europe-Asia Studies. 47.
- Anh Thư Hà & al.; et al. (2000), A Brief Chronology of Vietnam's History, Hanoi: Thế Giới Publishers.
- William Stewart Logan (2000), Hanoi, Biography of a City, Seattle, WA: University of Washington Press, ISBN 0-295-98014-1
- Loewe, Michael (2004), "Guangzhou: the Evidence of the Standard Histories from the Shi ji to the Chen shu, a Preliminary Survey", Guangdong: Archaeology and Early Texts (Zhou–Tang), Harrassowitz Verlag, pp. 51–80, ISBN 3-447-05060-8.
- William S. Logan (2005). "The Cultural Role of Capital Cities: Hanoi and Hue, Vietnam". Pacific Affairs. 78.
- Nora Annesley Taylor (2009), Painters in Hanoi: an Ethnography of Vietnamese Art, National University of Singapore Press, ISBN 978-9971-69-453-1
- Sandra Kurfürst (2012). Redefining Public Space in Hanoi: Places, Practices and Meaning. Münster: Lit Verlag.
- Lisa Drummond (2013). "Colonial Hanoi: Urban Space in Public Discourse". Harbin to Hanoi: Colonial Built Environment in Asia, 1840 to 1940. Hong Kong University Press.
