= Green Tangerine =

Restaurant in Hanoi, Vietnam

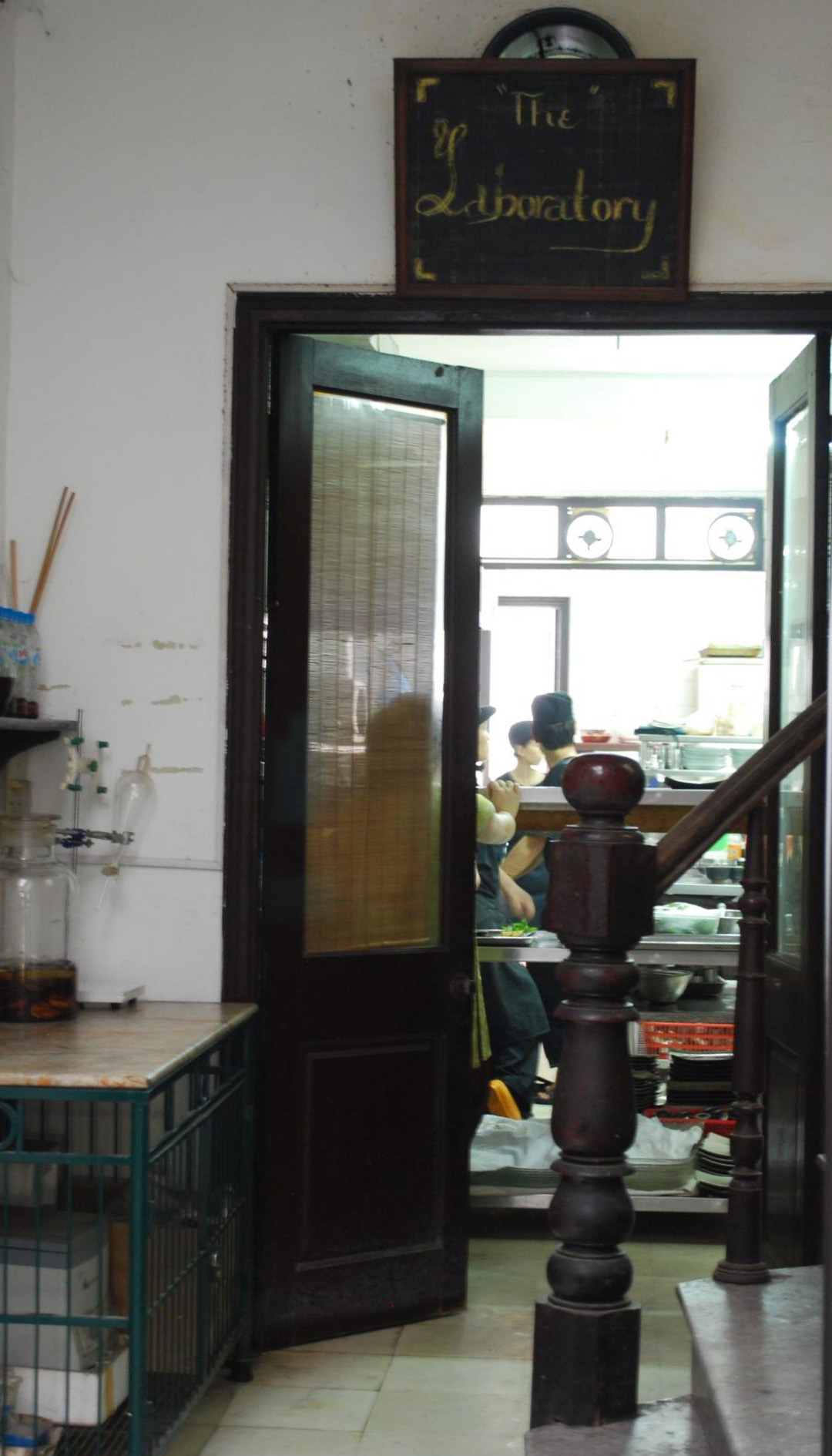
Inside the Green Tangerine

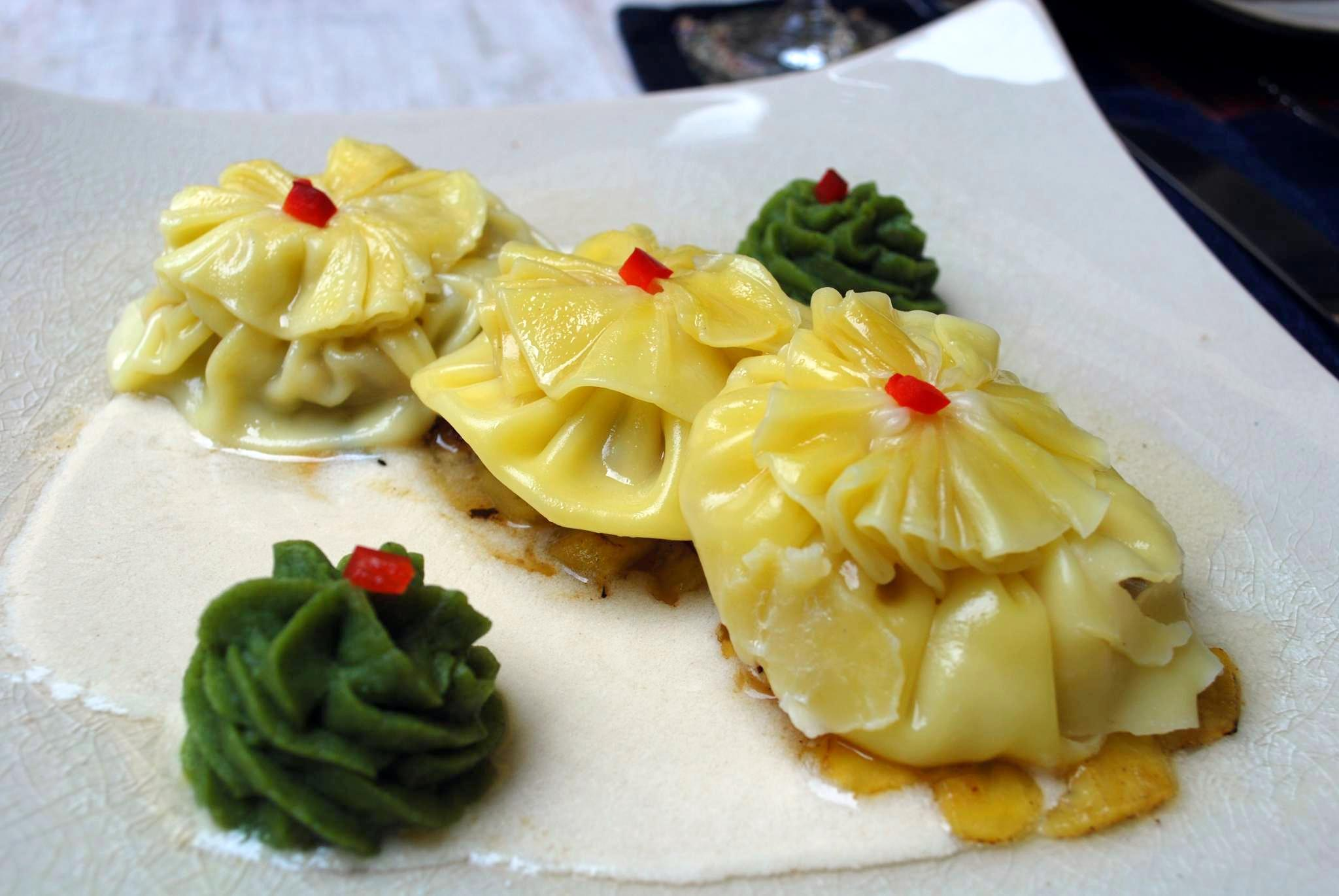
Salmon ravioli at the Green Tangerine

The Green Tangerine is a restaurant in Hàng Bè Street, Hoàn Kiếm, Hanoi, Vietnam. Set in a colonial building dated to 1928, in the heart of the Old Quarter, it serves French cuisine, with "Vietnamese undertones". It retains the ambiance of 1950s French Indochina, and has its own cobblestone courtyard. CNN states that it "meets all expectations of colonial Asian seductiveness". Frommer's notes its "creamy Cointreau-flavored frozen yoghurt served in a green tangerine shell". The former chef of the restaurant for thirteen years was Yvin Stephane.
