= Hàm Long Church =

- Nhà thờ Hàm Long
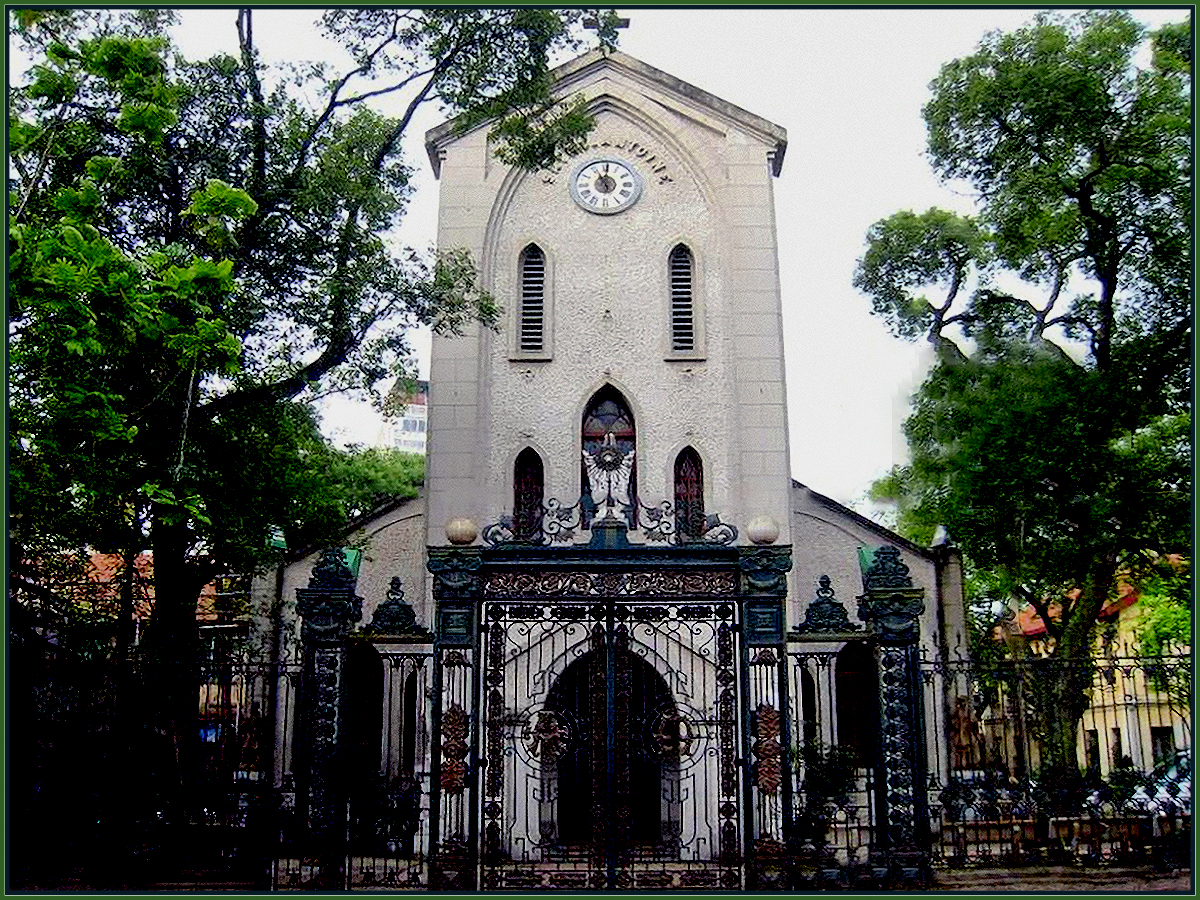
- Facade
- Hàm Long Church
- 21.018636°N 105.853931°E
- Location: Hanoi
- Country: Vietnam
- Denomination: Catholic Church

History
- Founded: 1934

Hàm Long Church (Vietnamese: Nhà thờ Hàm Long, French: Église Hàm Long), officially Church of St. Anthony of Padua (French: Église Saint-Antoine-de-Padoue), is a Roman Catholic church in the center district Hoàn Kiếm of Hanoi, Vietnam. The church was built at the end of the 19th century near an old street named Hàm Long from which Hàm Long Church was called. Today, Hàm Long Church is one of the three major churches of Hanoi, together with Cửa Bắc Church and Saint Joseph Cathedral. It was named after Saint Anthony of Padua.

== History ==
At the end of the 19th century, a Roman Catholic church was erected near the Doudart de Lagrée Street of Hanoi. This was an historic street of the Old Quarter of Hanoi with the former name Hàm Long, so the church was more commonly known as the Hàm Long Church. The actual church was built in 1934 after the design of a Vietnamese architect, at the time of the French administration. In this street there is also a Buddhist pagoda of the same name, Hàm Long Pagoda (Chùa Hàm Long), but its history was dated from the 11th century.
