= Four Great Treasures of Annam =

The Four Great Treasures of Annam (Vietnamese: An Nam tứ đại khí, chữ Hán: 安南四大器), were four bronzes of the cultures of Lý and Trần dynasties of Vietnam: the Báo Thiên Pagoda, the Quy Điền Bell, the Buddha Statues of Quỳnh Lâm Temple and the Phổ Minh Caldron. None of these artifacts survived.

== Báo Thiên Pagoda ==
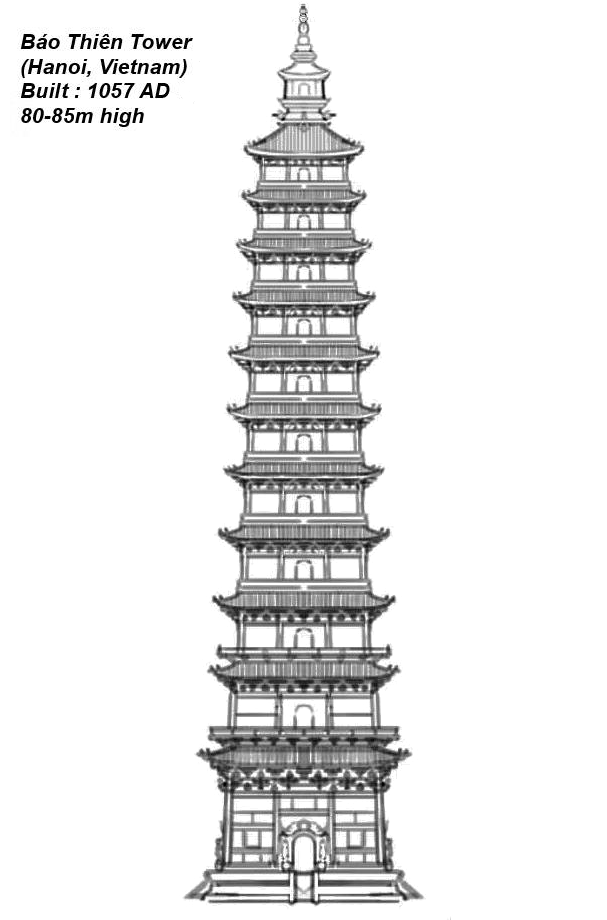
Báo Thiên Pagoda

State historical documents record construction of a 12 or 13 level tower in 1057 with 12,000 Vietnamese pound (7,250kg) of bronze being used to create a bell. The top of pagoda where doors were also made from bronze. The tower was 80 meters high, considerably higher than other structures, but was structurally weak. In 1225, the peak of the pagoda fell during a storm, and the top partly collapsed again in 1322.

Finally, the pagoda was destroyed by the Ming in 1414 during the Fourth Era of Northern Domination of Vietnam. The Báo Thiên Temple was repaired in 1434 but was abandoned later during the Revival Lê dynasty. The site became a place of market, and the ground of the tower itself was covered to become hills and a place of execution.

In 1880s, part of the site of the abandoned temple was used to build the Great Church or St. Joseph's Cathedral.

== Quy Điền Bell ==
Around 1049, the One Pillar Pagoda was built in the centre of a pond and during renovations to the building in 1105, a huge bell, named chuông Giác Thế - the bell that awakens people in the world - was constructed from 12,000kg of bronze. However, the bell was too heavy to be hung and since it could not be rung on the ground, it was dropped into a deep rice field nearby. The bell was later found to be surround by tortoises and hence it was renamed chuông Quy Điền - tortoise-field bell.

During the Ming invasion, in 1426, the bell was also requisitioned by Ming General Wang Tong (Chinese: 王通; Vietnamese: Vương Thông) to be used to make weapons.

The one-pillar pagoda was renovated several times between 1840 & 1850 and 1922.

== Buddha Statues of Quỳnh Lâm Temple ==
The Quỳnh Lâm Temple was originally constructed at the start of the 6th century and restored & improved on numerous occasions. During the 11th century, Quỳnh Lâm was an important centre for Buddhism, becoming the primary centre for the entire country in the 17th & 18th centuries.

In 1328, a statue of Maitreya was cast standing almost 5m tall and visible from miles around. It is recorded that 900kg of gold was contributed to the statue. The statue was the largest at the site but it is recorded by monk Pháp Loa, that it had more than 1,300 big and small bronze statues cast and another 100 earth statues.

During the Ming invasion, the temple was reduced to ruins and the statues destroyed.

== Phổ Minh Cauldron ==
The Phổ Minh Temple was built during the Lý dynasty and expanded in 1262. The entrance was guarded by a 7 tonne bronze cauldron which was big enough to contain two adults.

While the pagoda survives, the cauldron suffered the same fate as other bronzes during the early 15th century Ming invasion.
