= Phổ Minh Temple =

Buddhist temple in Vietnam

Coordinates: 20.45°N 106.16°E

- Chùa Phổ Minh
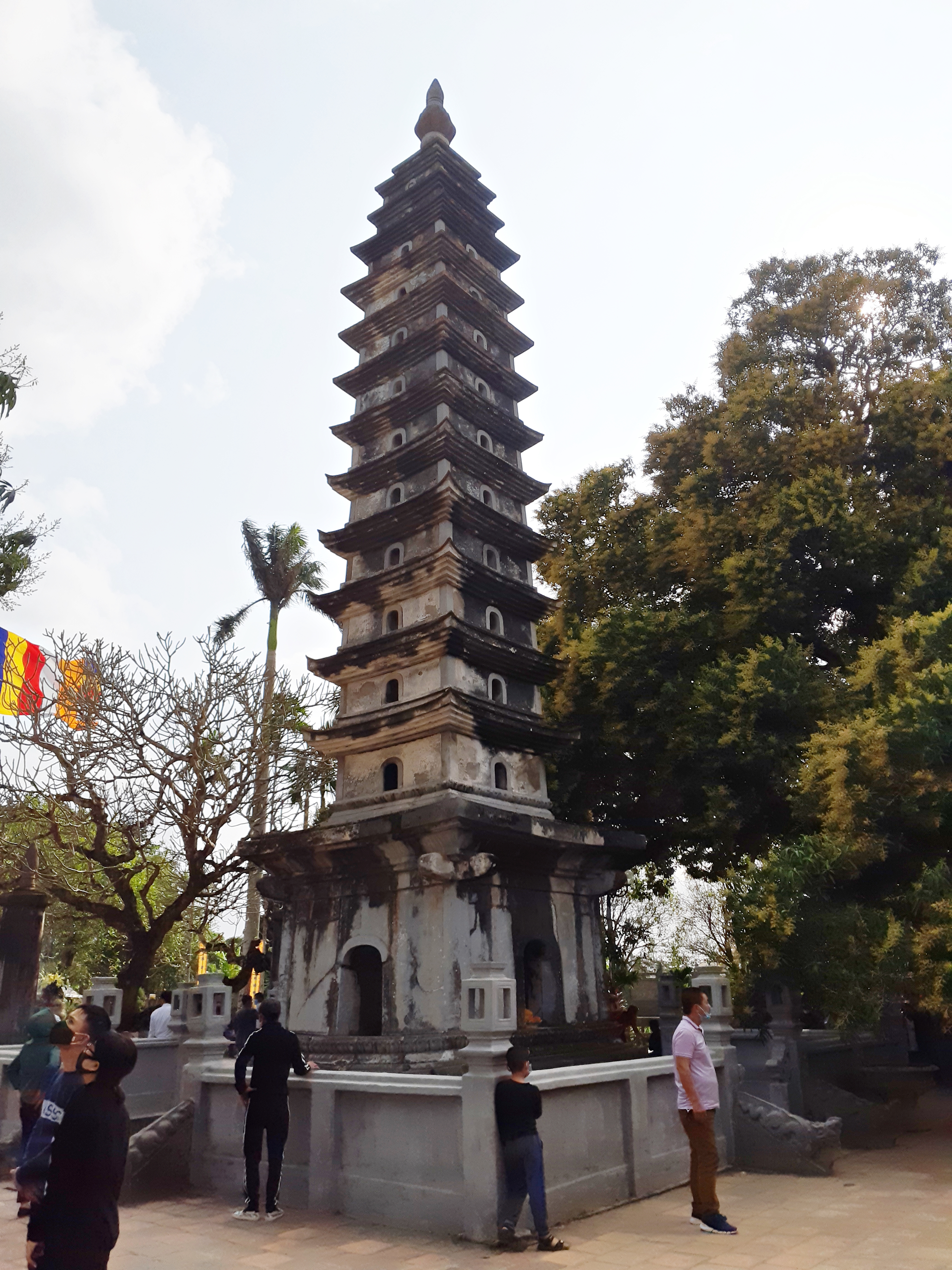
- Phổ Minh Pagoda

Religion
- Affiliation: Buddhism
- Province: Nam Định

Location
- Country: Vietnam
- Interactive map of Phổ Minh Temple

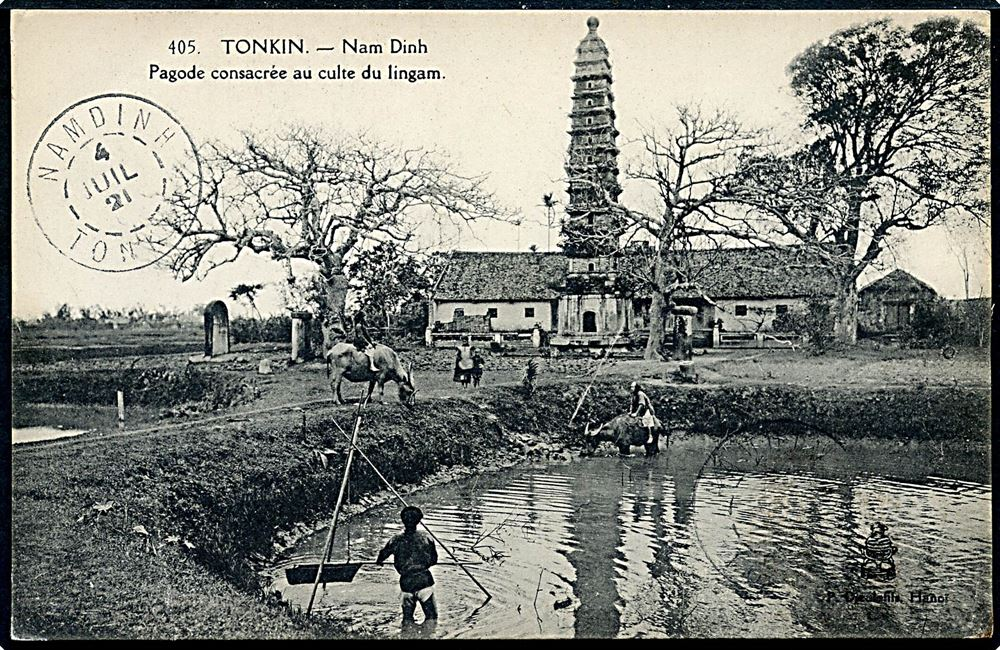
Pho Minh Temple in 1921

Phổ Minh Temple (Vietnamese: Chùa Phổ Minh, Chữ Hán: 普明寺) is a Buddhist temple in Tức Mặc village, 5 kilometres north of Nam Định city, Vietnam, the home town of the Trần dynasty.

== History ==
According to official historical documents, the temple was built in 1262, west of the Trần dynasty's Trung Quang Palace. But according to steles at the temple, the bell of the temple was made since the Lý dynasty. The temple was possibly extensively renovated in 1305. Through many renovations, there still exist artistic relics from the Trần dynasty.

== See also ==
- Four Great Treasures of Annam
