= Cửa Bắc Church =

- Church of Our Lady of Hà Nội
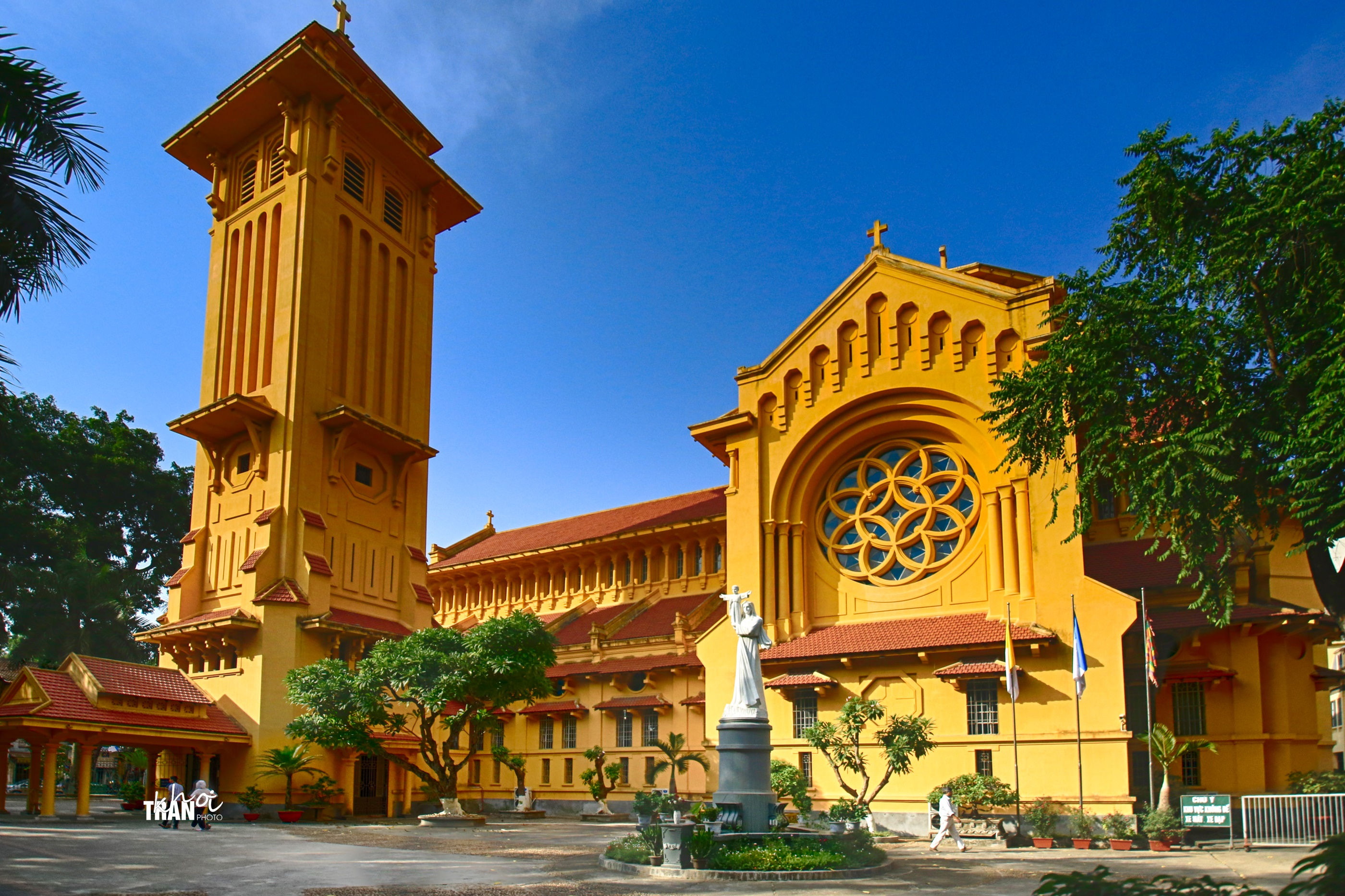
- The church was restored to its original yellow paint in 2013
- Cửa Bắc Church
- 21.041368°N 105.840708°E
- Location: Hanoi
- Country: Vietnam
- Denomination: Catholic Church
- Website: https://cuabacchurch.com/

History
- Former name(s): Église des Martyrs (Church of Martyrs)

Architecture
- Architect: Ernest Hébrard
- Style: Eclectic Renaissance, Indochinoise, Art Deco & Baroque
- Completed: 1931

Cửa Bắc Church ("Northern Gate Church", Vietnamese: Nhà thờ Cửa Bắc, French: Église Cửa Bắc) is a Roman Catholic church in Hanoi, Vietnam. Originally named as Church of Our Lady of the Martyrs (Vietnamese: Nhà thờ Nữ Vương Các Thánh Tử Đạo), the church was built in 1931 by the French administration of Indochina as a part of the Hanoi's urban plan supervised by Ernest Hébrard. Today, Cửa Bắc Church is one of the three major churches of Hanoi, together with Hàm Long Church and Saint Joseph Cathedral. In November 2006, Cửa Bắc Church became the venue of a joint worship service of Vietnamese Catholics and Protestants with the participation of United States president George W. Bush, who was on an official visit to Vietnam.

== History ==
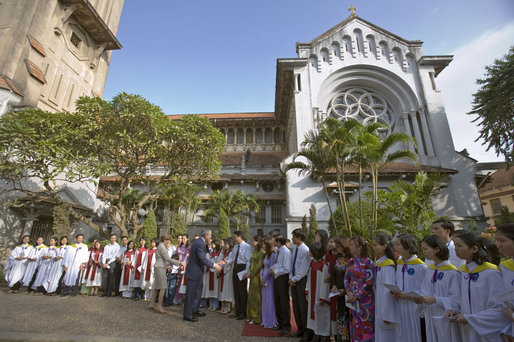
George W. Bush and Laura Bush in their visit to Cua Bac Church.

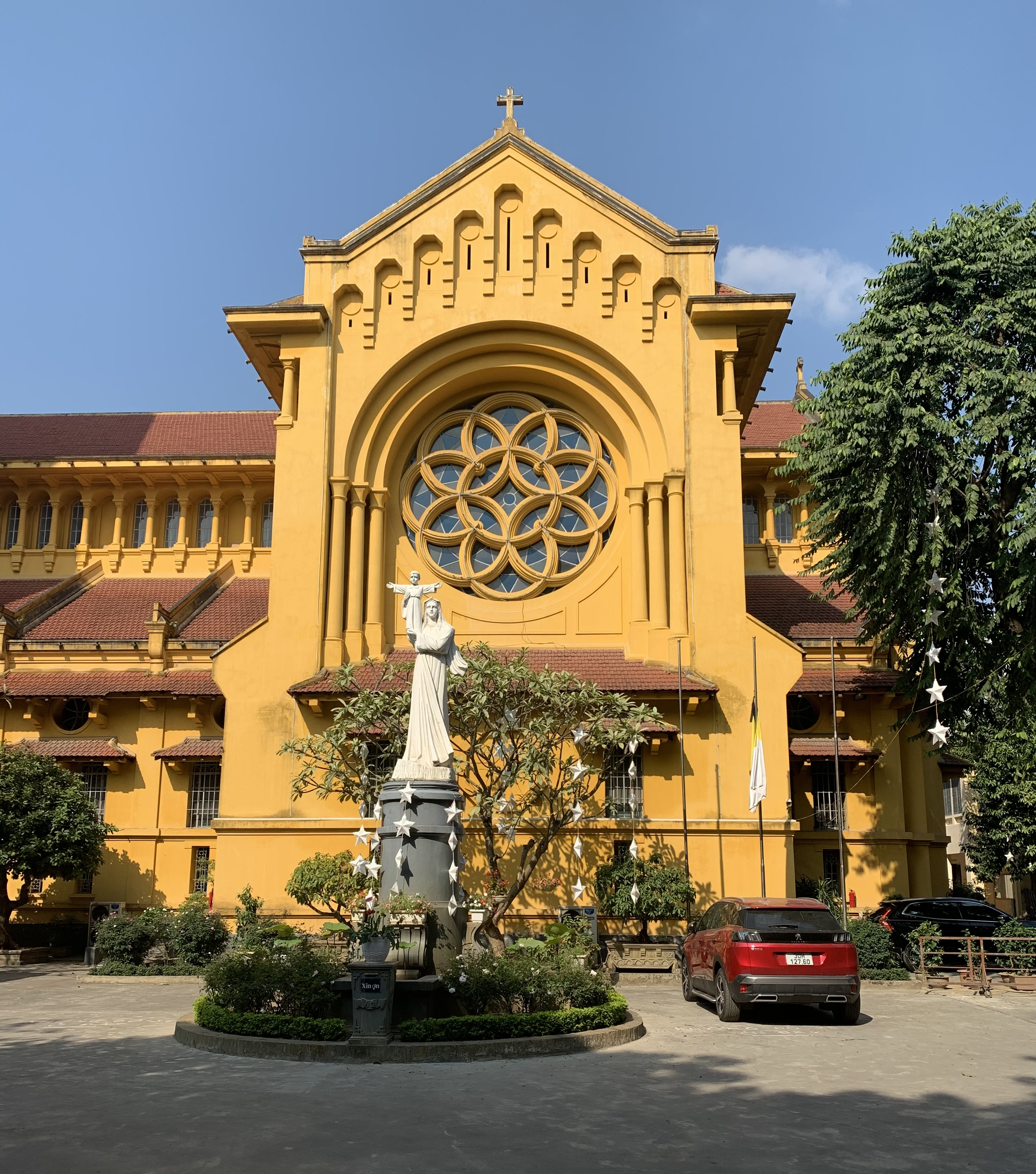
South facade of the church with the statue of the Virgin Mary

In the early 1920s, the French architect Ernest Hébrard began his urban plan to redesign the city of Hanoi, as a part of this plan, a new Roman Catholic church named Church of Martyrs (French: Église des Martyrs) was built in front of the Northern Gate (Cửa Bắc) of the ancient Hanoi Citadel in 1932. Because of its location, the church was more commonly known as Cửa Bắc Church. Ernest Hébrard designed Cửa Bắc Church in eclectic style with strong influence of Art Deco decoration. He also integrated in the church some elements of traditional architecture in Vietnam such as the system of roof tiles and the harmony between the main architecture with its surrounding green space. For that reason, Cửa Bắc Church is considered a fine example for the mixed style between European and Vietnamese architectures.

Originally planned to be named Vietnamese Martyrs, the title of the church was changed to Queen of Martyrs because at that time, the Vietnamese Martyrs was not yet canonized. In 1959, the Apostolic Vicar Joseph-Marie Trịnh Như Khuê re-titled it as the Church of Our Lady of Hanoi. The feast day of the church's title is July 2, the old date for Visitation.

Today, Cửa Bắc Church is one of the three major churches in downtown Hanoi, together with Hàm Long Church and Saint Joseph Cathedral. In November 2006, Cửa Bắc Church was chosen the venue of a joint congregation of the Vietnamese Catholics and Protestants with participation of the United States President George W. Bush, who was on an official visit to Vietnam. After the service, the President remarked: "Laura and I just had a moment to converse with God in a church here in Hanoi. We were touched by the simplicity and the beauty of the moment. We appreciate very much the congregation for allowing us to come and worship with them."
