= Hanoi Garden =

Restaurant in Hanoi, Vietnam

Coordinates: 21°1′52.63″N 105°50′55.13″E

Hanoi Garden is a restaurant in Hanoi, Vietnam. It opened in 1998 on Hang Manh street in the Old Quarter. It serves Vietnamese cuisine with a twist and is quite popular with the local Vietnamese. The restaurant has seating for about 200 people. The Vietnam Economic Times has praised its variety of dishes, saying, "You can't fault the Hanoi Garden in this respect, at least. Its bill of fare has page after page of Vietnamese dishes."
