= Old Quarter, Hanoi =

Vietnamese historical civic urban core

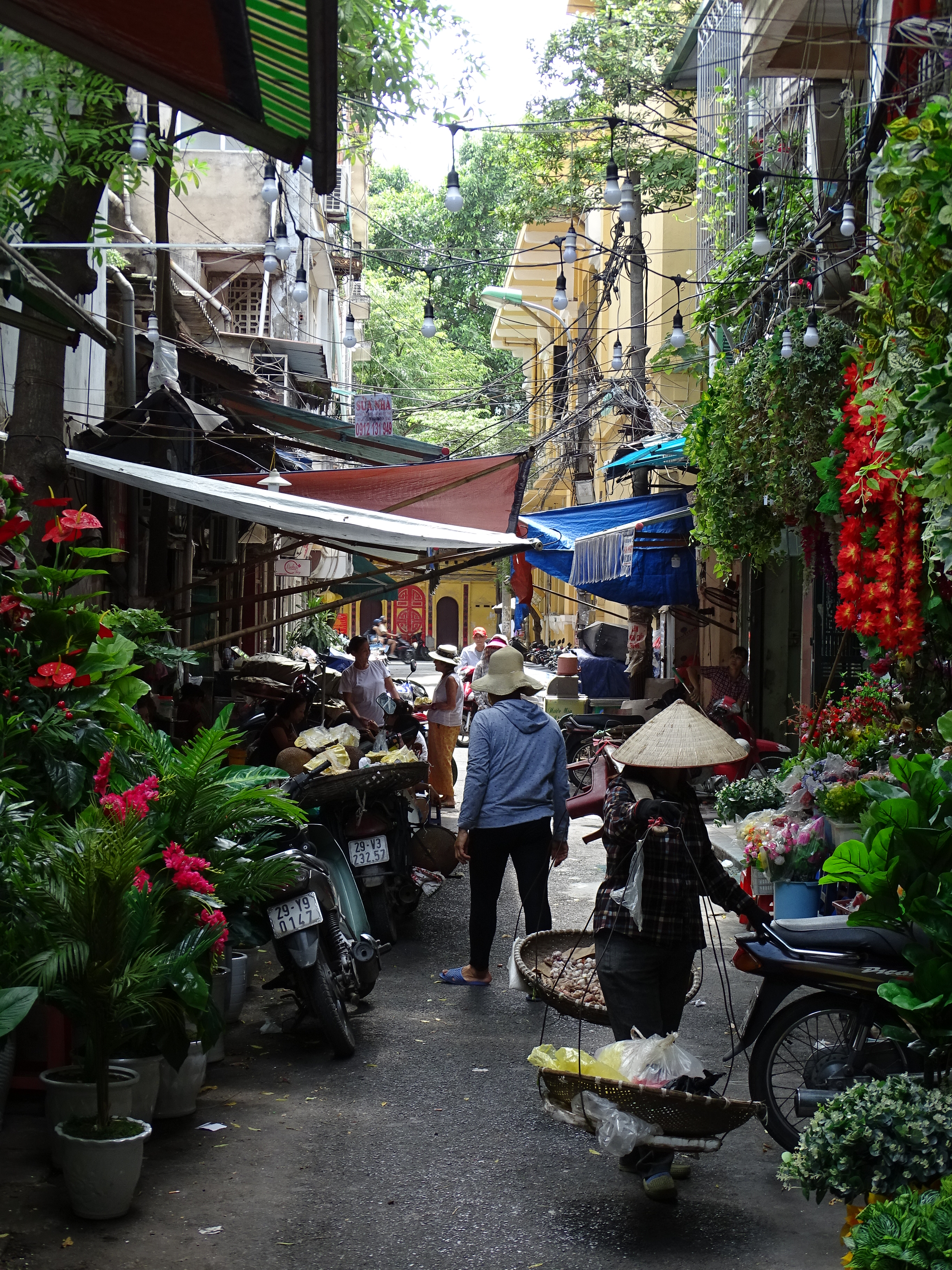
An alley in Hanoi's Old Quarter

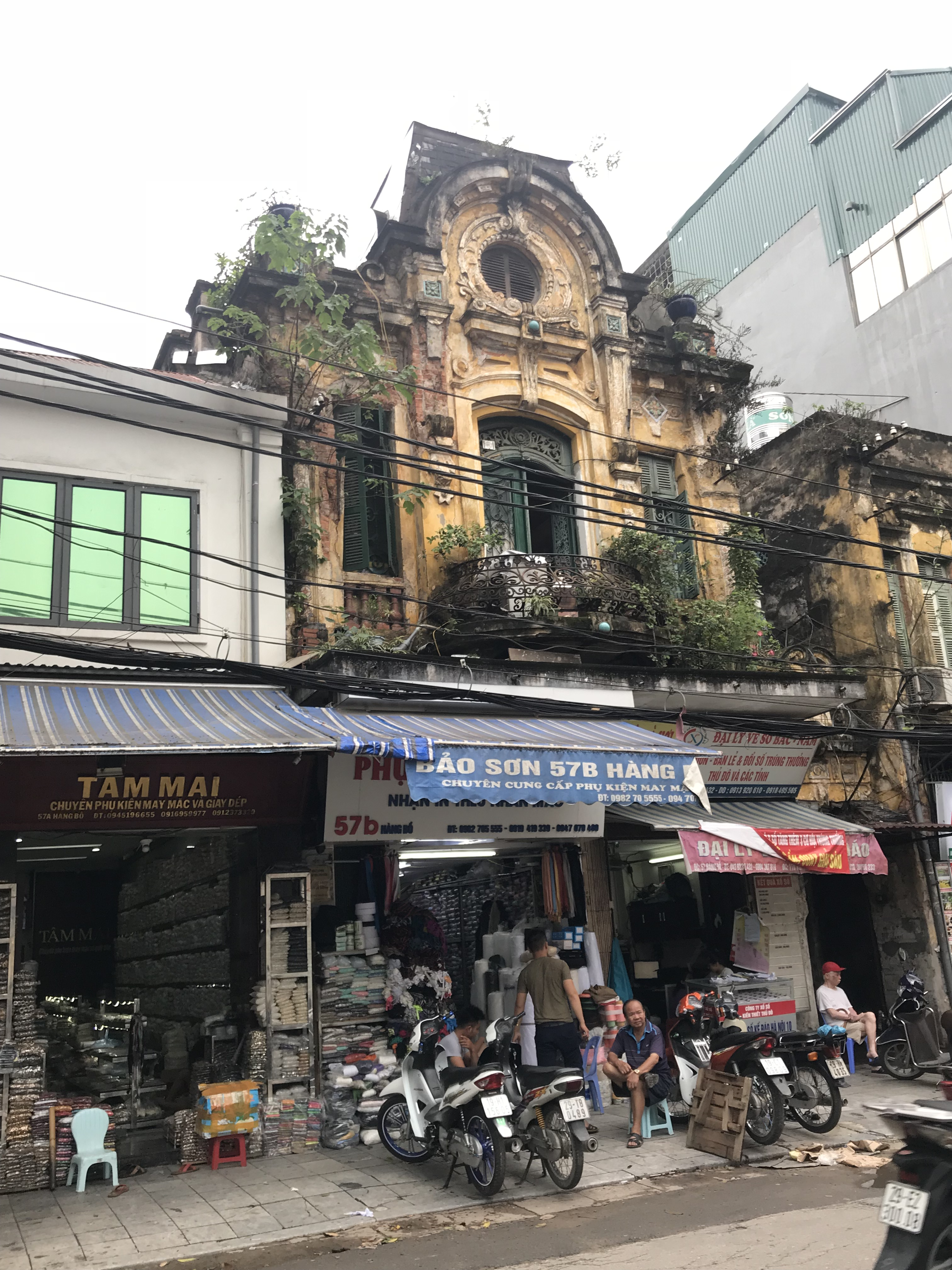
Typical French Indochina architecture in the old quarter

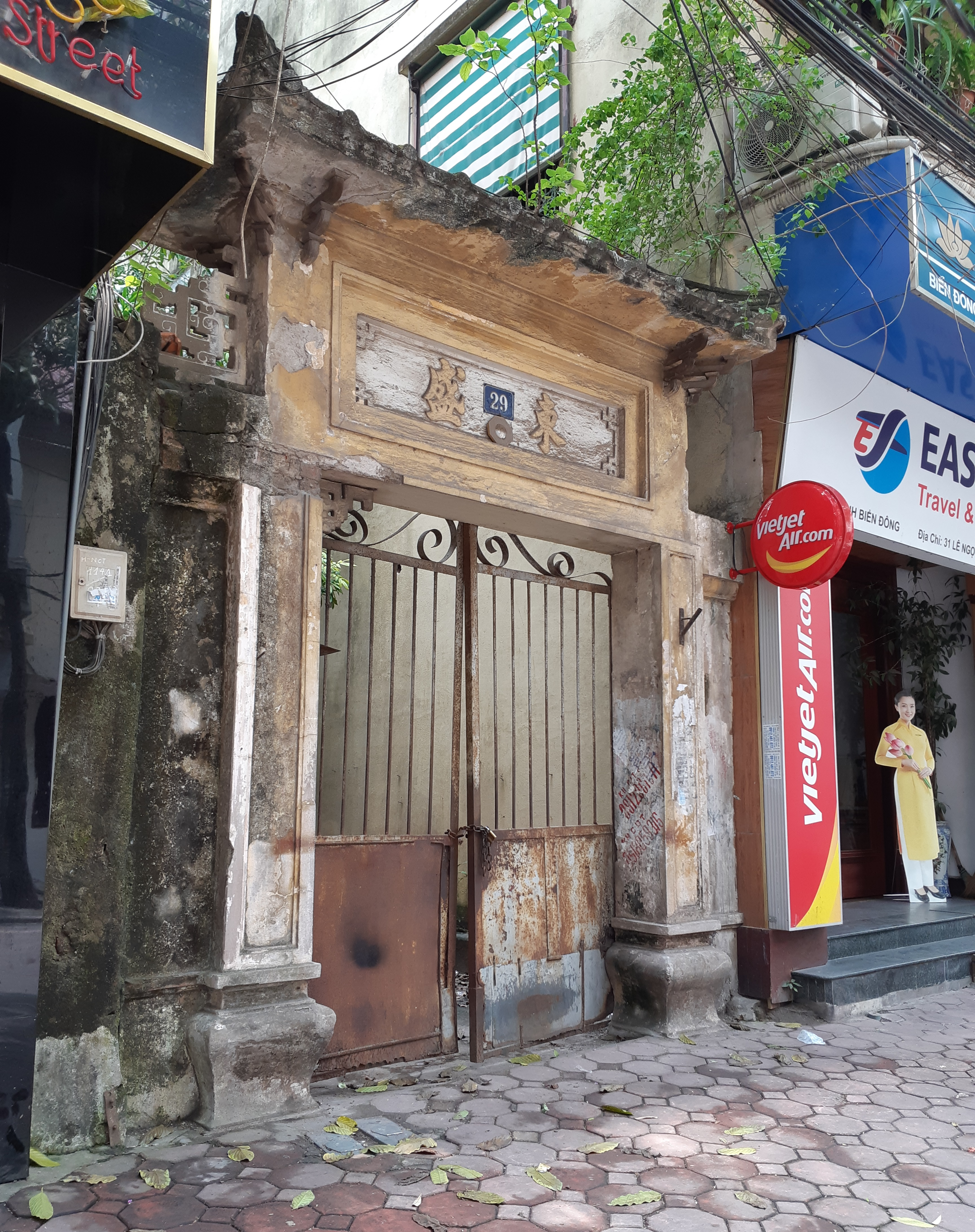
The ancient gate of the house at 29 Lê Ngọc Hân Street (formerly Lữ Gia Street), Hai Bà Trưng District, Hanoi)

The Old Quarter (Vietnamese: Phố cổ Hà Nội) is the name commonly given to the historical civic urban core of Hanoi, Vietnam, located outside the Imperial Citadel of Thăng Long. This quarter used to be the residential, manufacturing and commercial center, where each street was specialized in one specific type of manufacturing or commerce.

Another common name referring to approximately the same area is the 36 streets (Vietnamese: Hà Nội 36 phố phường), after the 36 streets or guilds that used to make up the urban area of the city.

== Extent ==
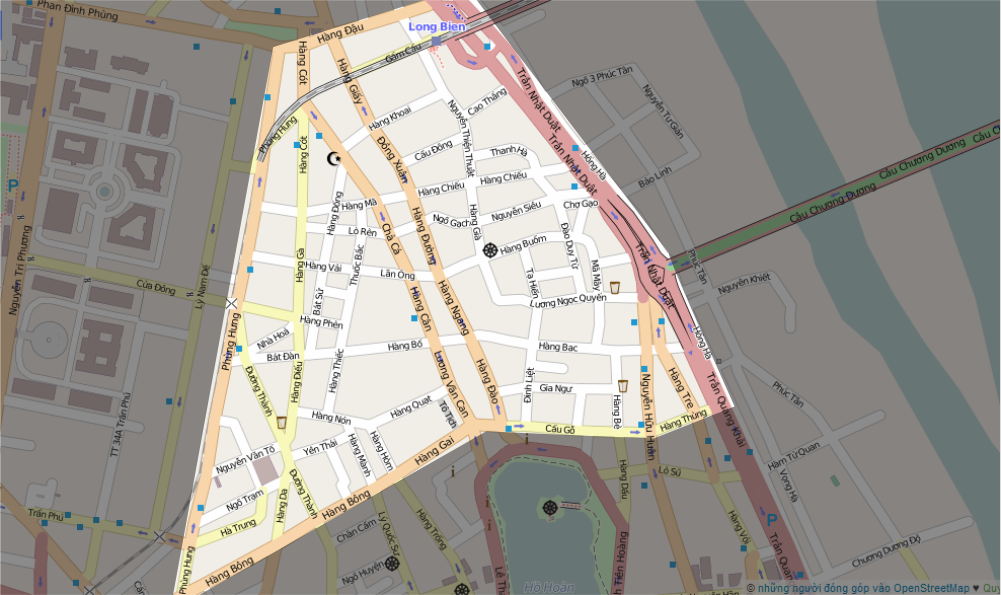
Map showing the official extent of the Old Quarter

The official extent of the Hanoi Old Quarter has been fixed by a 1995 decision from the Vietnamese Ministry of Construction: in the north it is limited by Hàng Đậu street, in the west by Phùng Hưng street, in the south by Hàng Bông street, Hàng Gai street, Cầu Gỗ street, and Hàng Thùng street, and in the east by Trần Quang Khải street and Trần Nhật Duật street. Several of the streets that were part of the historic urban area of Hanoi lie outside this region, which was determined for being most dense in historical streets and for having maintained its historical character best.

The official Old Quarter is part of the Hoàn Kiếm District. Its total area is about 100 ha and it counts 76 streets distributed over 10 wards.

== History ==
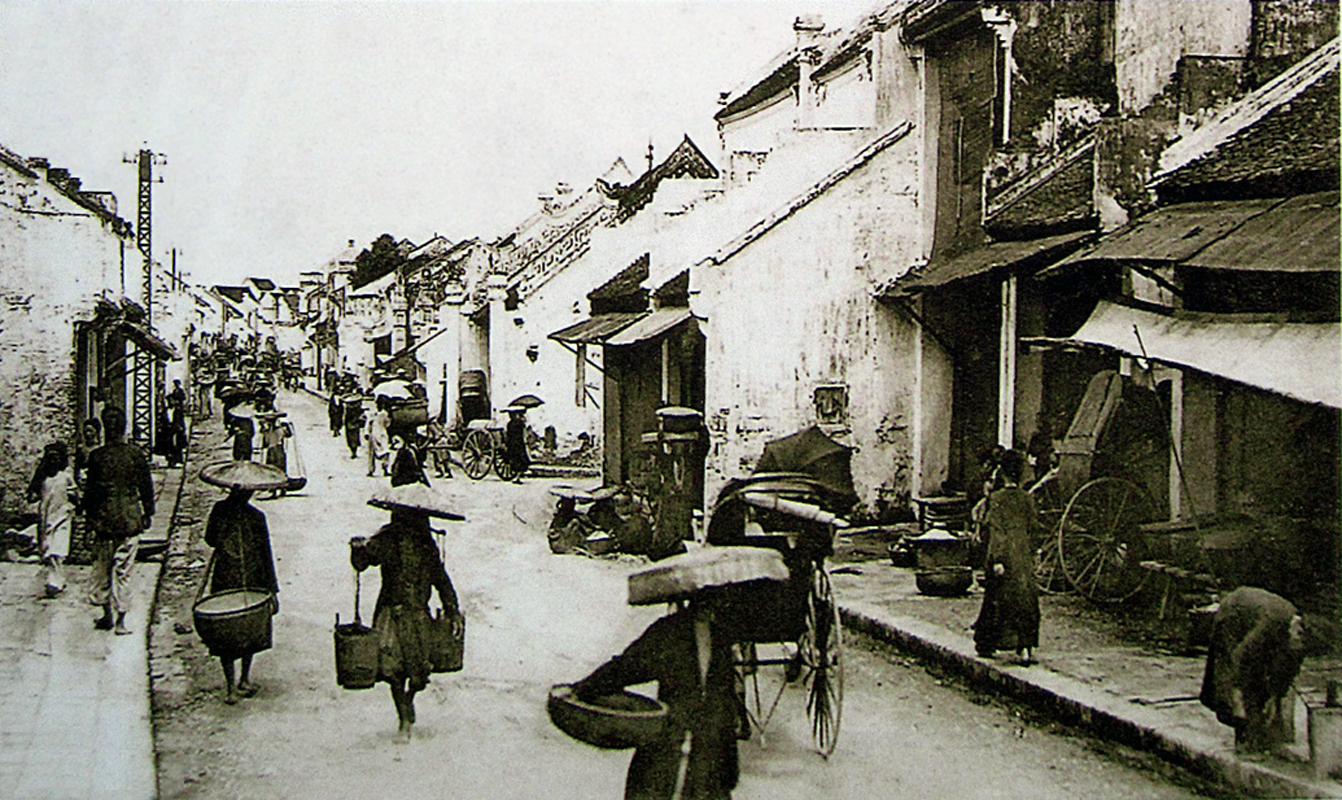
Hàng Mắm street around 1905

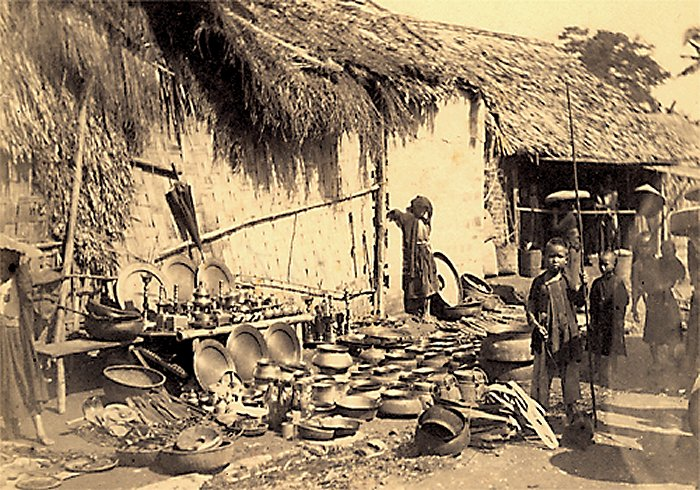
Copper wares shop

The residential and commercial area that is now the Old Quarter came to be during the Lý and Trần dynasties and was then located east of the Imperial Citadel of Thăng Long and along the Red River. During the Lê dynasty, scholar Nguyễn Trãi already mentioned some of the areas each specialized in one particular trade. It was then surrounded by a defensive wall with several gates.

During the Lê dynasty, the area included several lakes and wetlands, the largest of which was Thái Cực lake. These lakes, as well as the Tô Lịch River were connected with Hoàn Kiếm lake and the Red River. Near the end of the 19th century these lakes and rivers became isolated from each other.

During the Lý and Trần dynasties, many people from the surrounding plains migrated to the city and settled in what is now the Old Quarter, creating the densest urban area of the city. The Lê dynasty period saw an additional influx of Chinese immigrants who arrived to trade, creating several Chinese neighborhoods, which survived until the mass expulsion of ethnic Chinese from Vietnam in the late 1970s.

During the French colonial period, the Old Quarter underwent partial rebuilding. Two small markets were demolished to make place for Đồng Xuân Market, and a tramway was constructed through the quarter. Many French and Indian businessmen settled in the area to conduct business. Today, the area remains the commercial heart of Hanoi.

== 36 guild streets ==
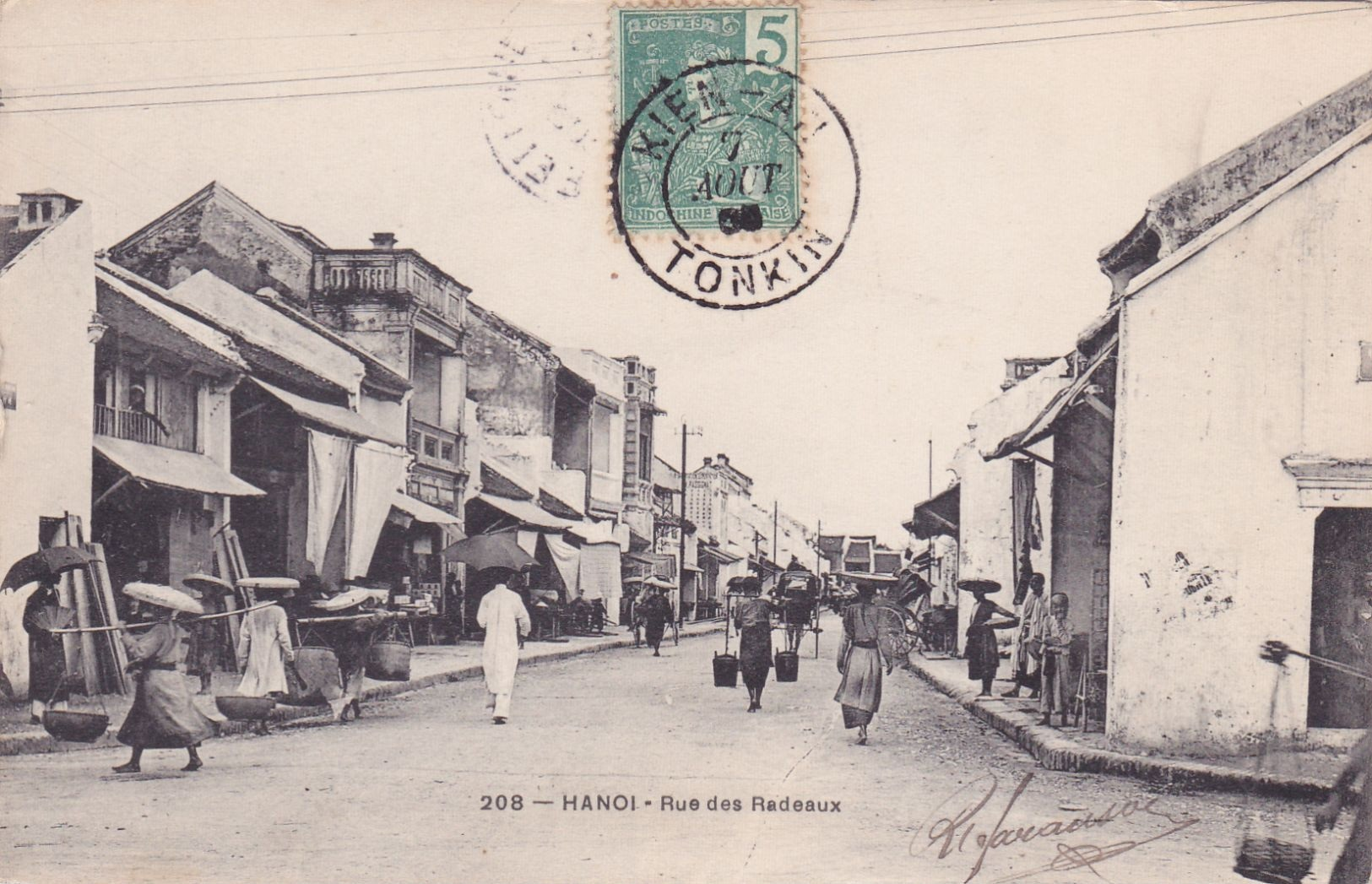
Hàng Bè street

The most famous trait of the Old Quarter are its areas dedicated to one specific trade or guild. Craftsmen from villages around the city used to gather in one area of their guild to sell their wares to merchants. The crafts or guilds of each area gave the names to the streets of the quarter, so that most streets acquired names starting with hàng ("wares"), such as Hàng Tre street ("bamboo wares street") and Hàng Đồng street ("copper wares street").

Several of the streets are still specialized in the trade that gave them their names. Others still specialize in one specific trade, but a different one from their traditional specialty — such as Hàng Buồm street ("sails street") which has become dominated by Vietnamese cakes and candy.

The Old Quarter has been shown by researchers using the quantitative social anthropology approach to have exhibited Hanoi's cultural evolution during the first decades of the 20th century.

== Historical architecture ==
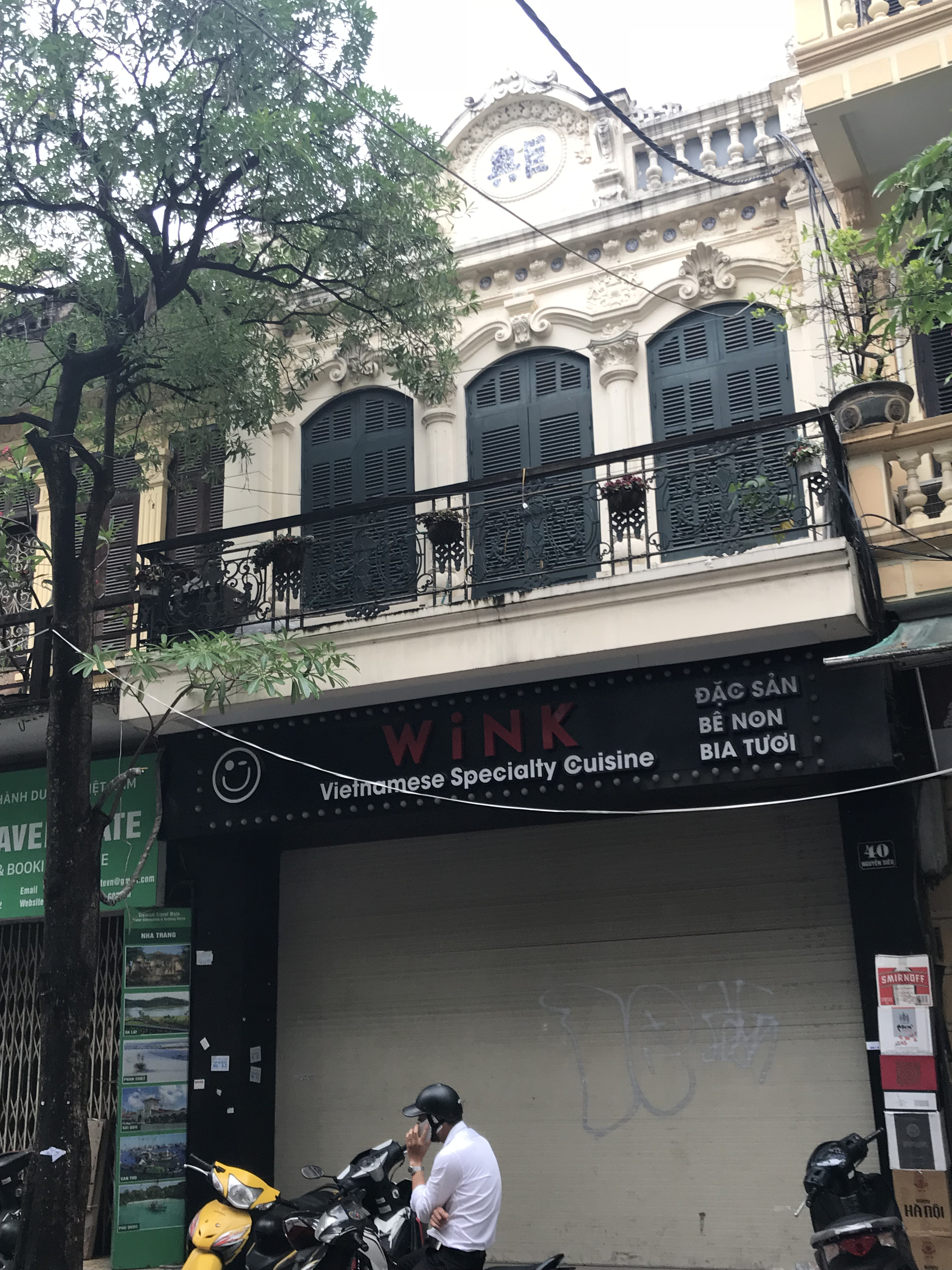
Old shophouse architecture

The Old Quarter contains many historic sights, such as temples, pagodas, and assembly halls.

Most craft streets used to have a temple dedicated to worshiping mythical founders of the craft. Particular is that the ground floor of such communal temples in the Hanoi Old Quarter was often still used for commerce. With the passage of time, most such communal temples have been destroyed. Several temples have survived, such as the Mã Mây and Kim Cổ temples.

Several city gates were located in what is now the Old Quarter. Today, only the Quan Chưởng gate remains.

Characteristic of the Old Quarter is the ancient architecture of the commercial area. Most of the historic houses there are shophouses with slanted tile roofs, of which the side facing the street used to be used as entrance to the shop inside. Houses of this type were mostly built in the 18th and 19th centuries — before that most houses had thatched roofs.

Since the end of the 20th century, the number of traditional houses have been dwindling in number as demolitions and rebuildings continue.

== Preservation ==
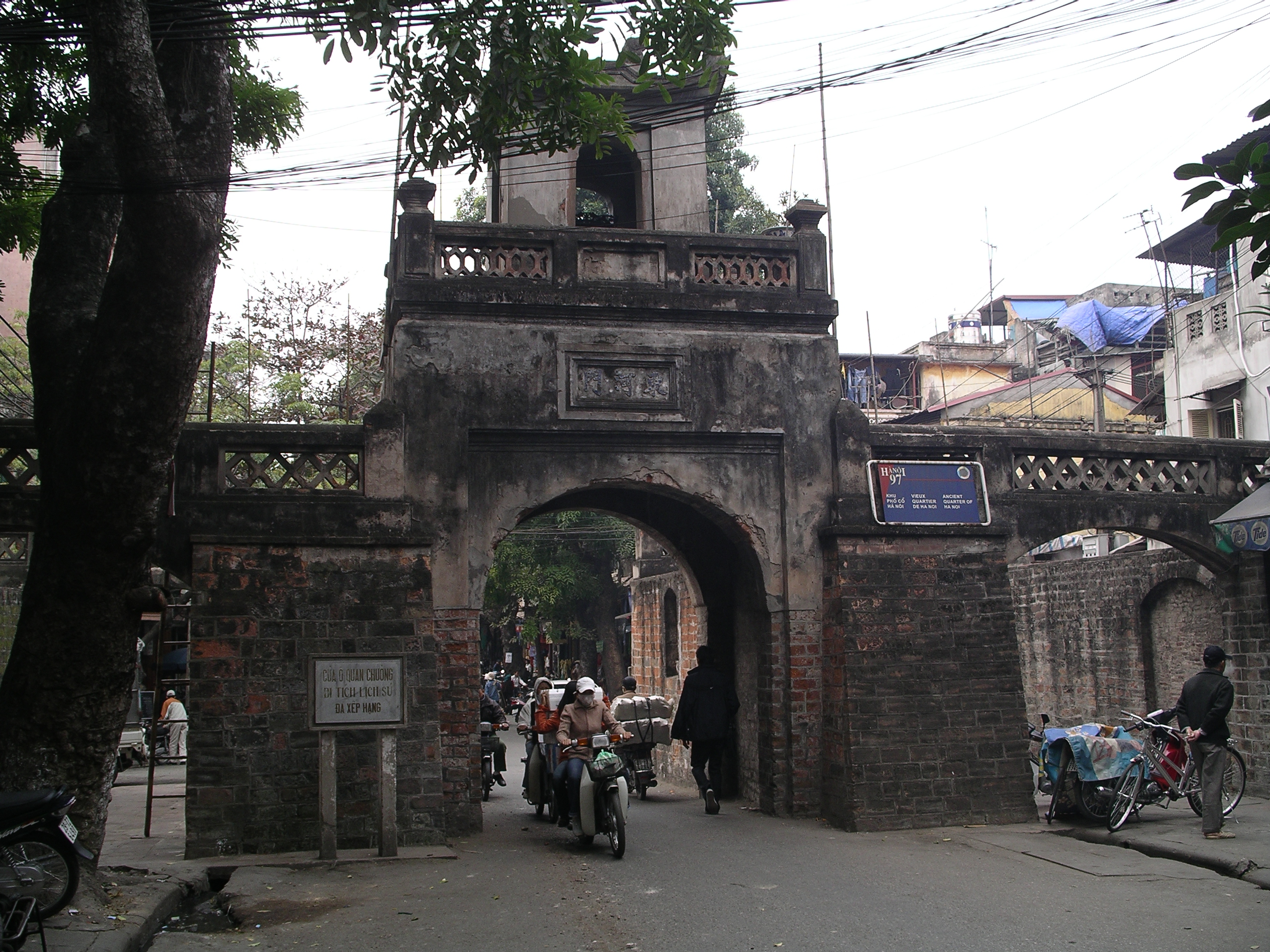
Quan Chưởng Gate, the remaining city gate of old Hanoi

Many of the historic remnants of the Old Quarter have deteriorated and are in need of restoration. For the 1000th anniversary of Hà Nội in 2010, the Hanoi People's Committee spent 50 billion VND on the refurbishing of 75 streets inside and outside the Old Quarter, applying lime to restore the yellow color of façades in the Old Quarter among other efforts. The process has been criticised for having been executed carelessly, leading to a less than optimal result.

Vietnamese painter Bùi Xuân Phái has created many paintings of the Old Quarter, pioneering a particular school of Vietnamese painting.

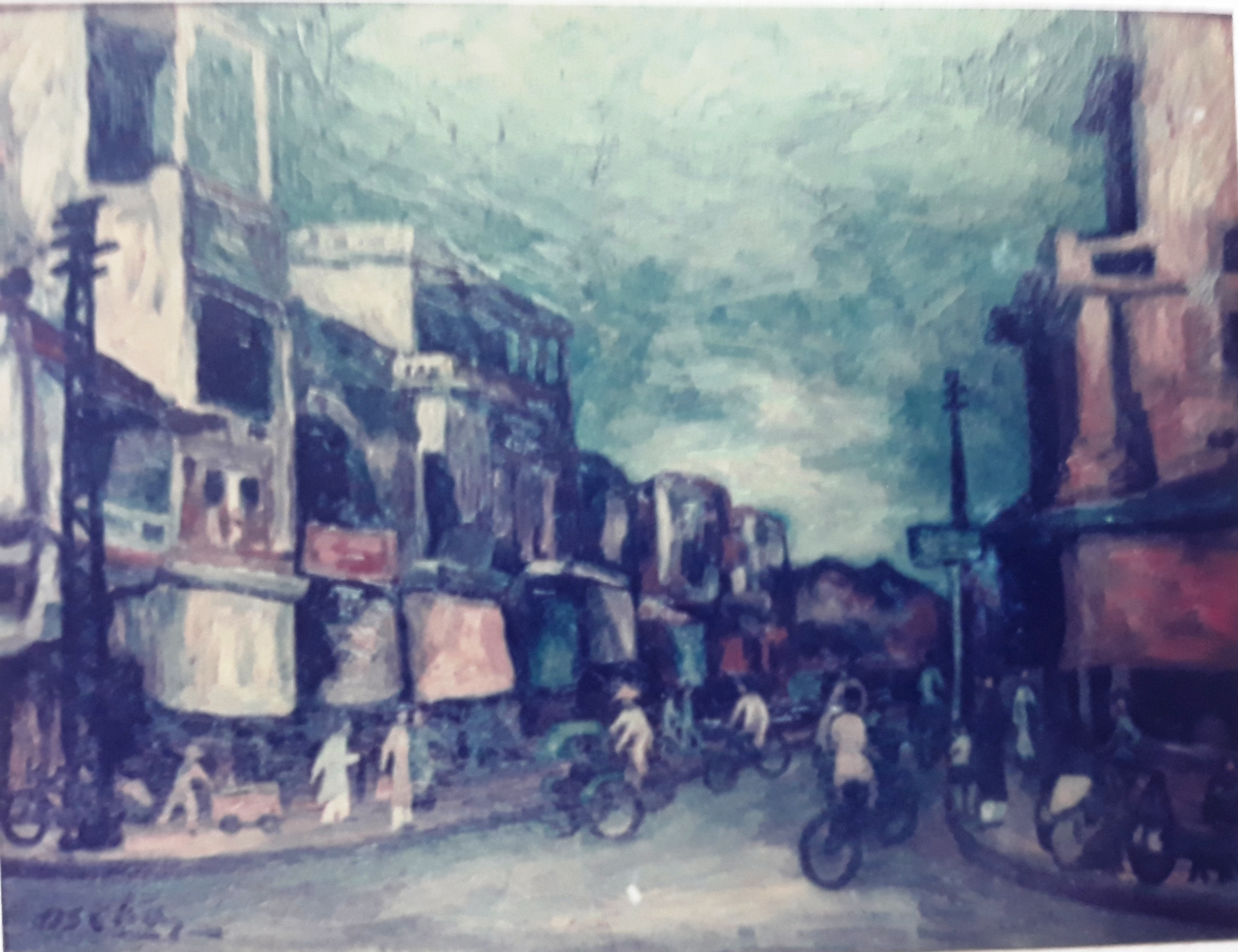
Hàng Đào street in 1954, oil painting by Đào Sĩ Chu.

== Image gallery ==
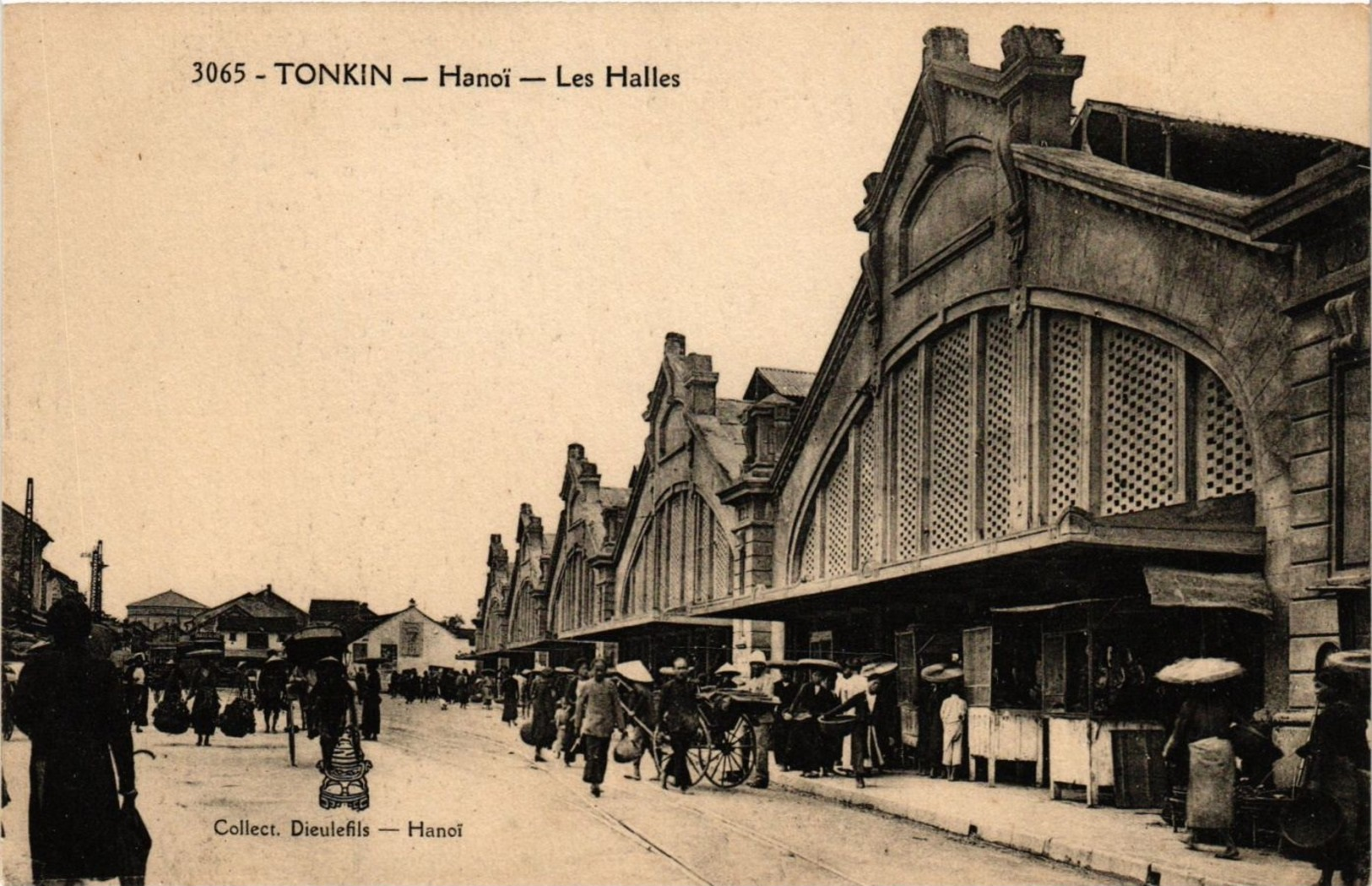
Đồng Xuân Market

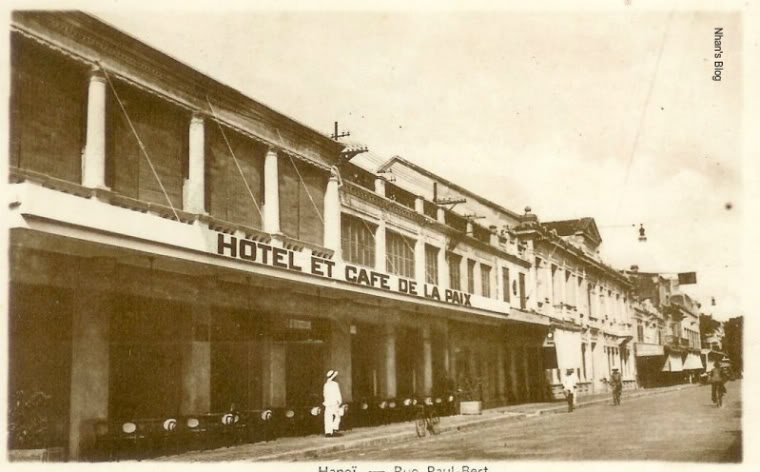
Tràng Tiền street

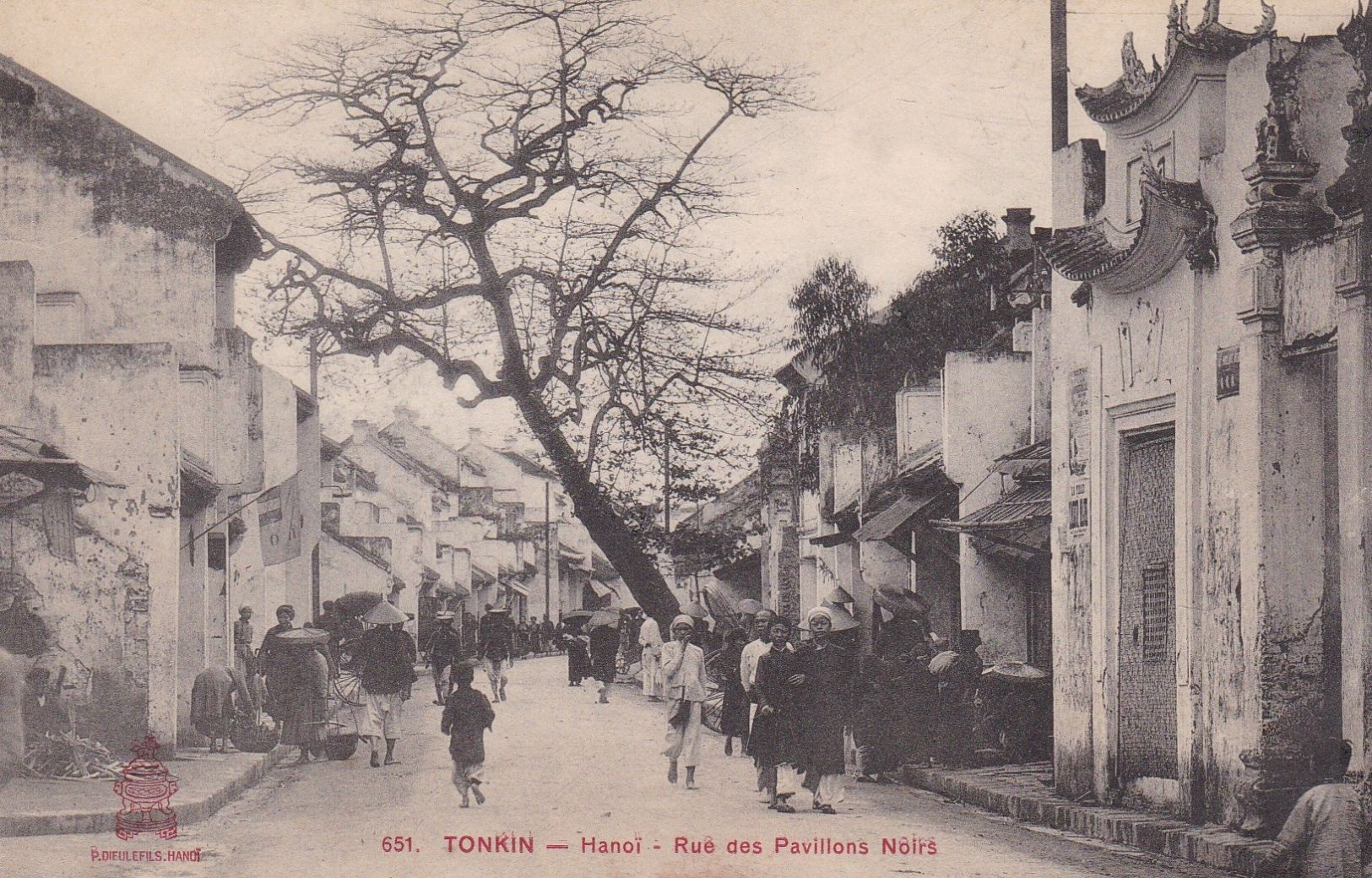
Cờ Đen street

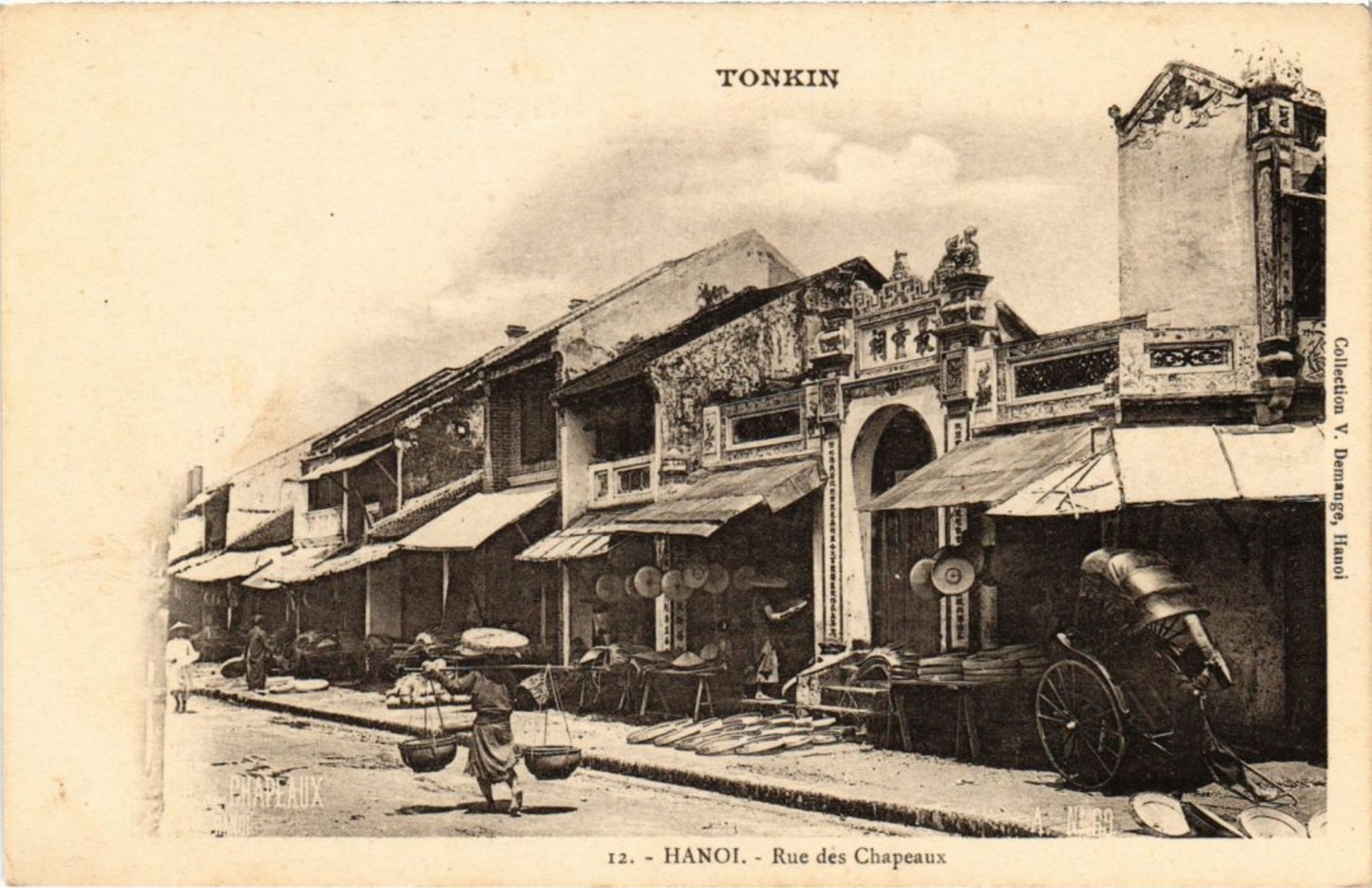
Hàng Nón street

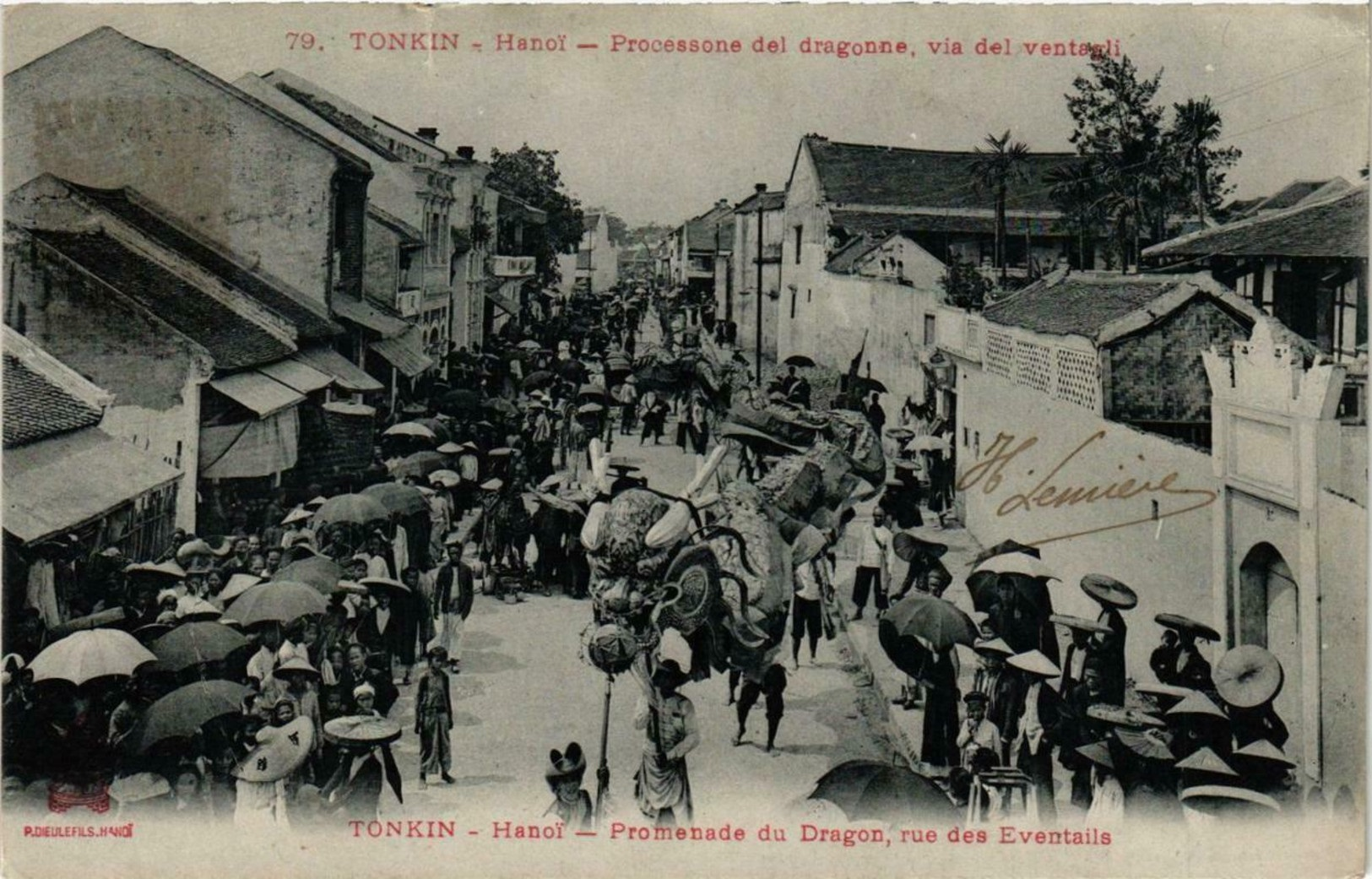
Hàng Quạt street

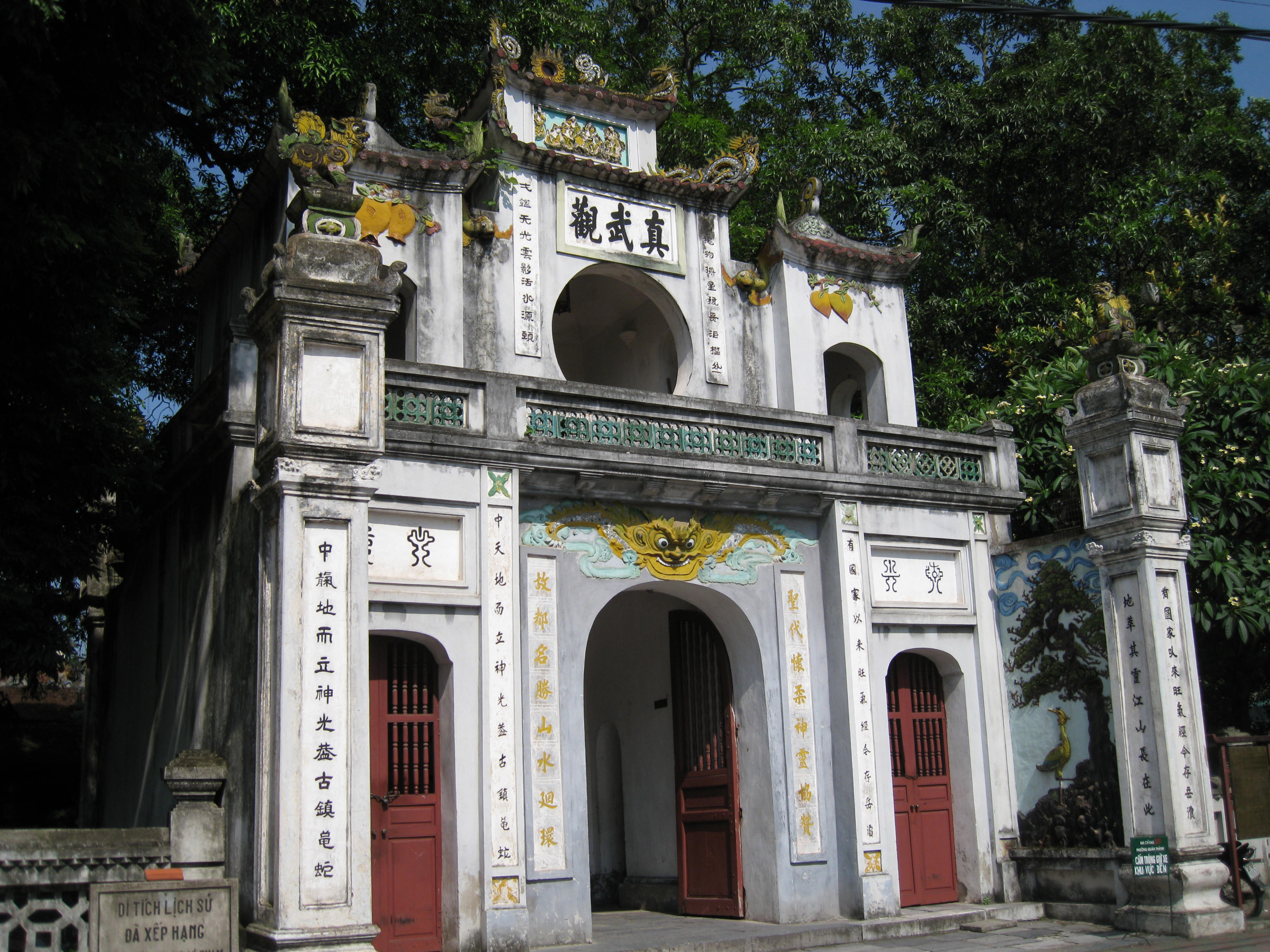
Quán Thánh Temple

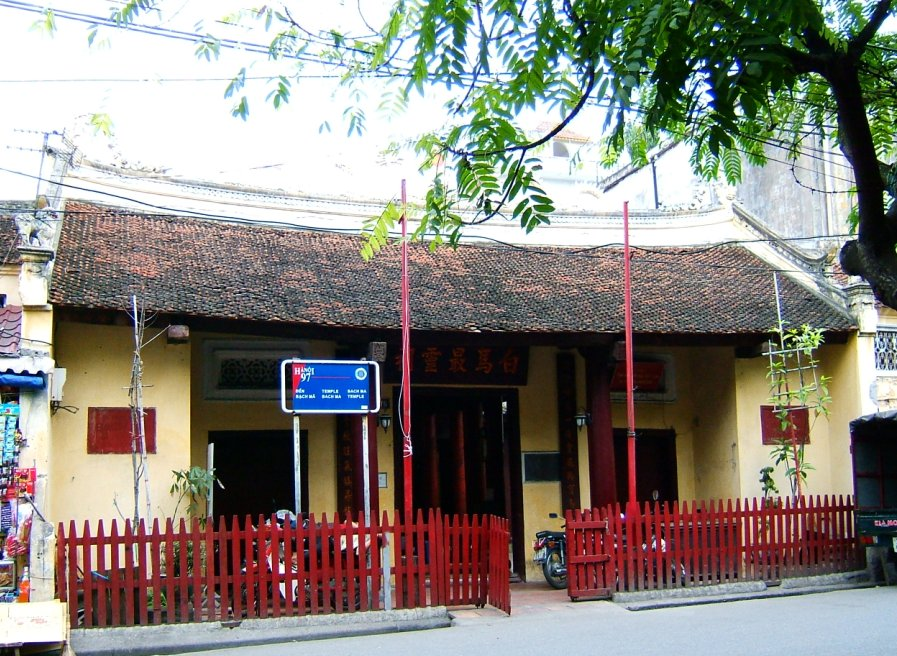
Bạch Mã (White Horse) Temple

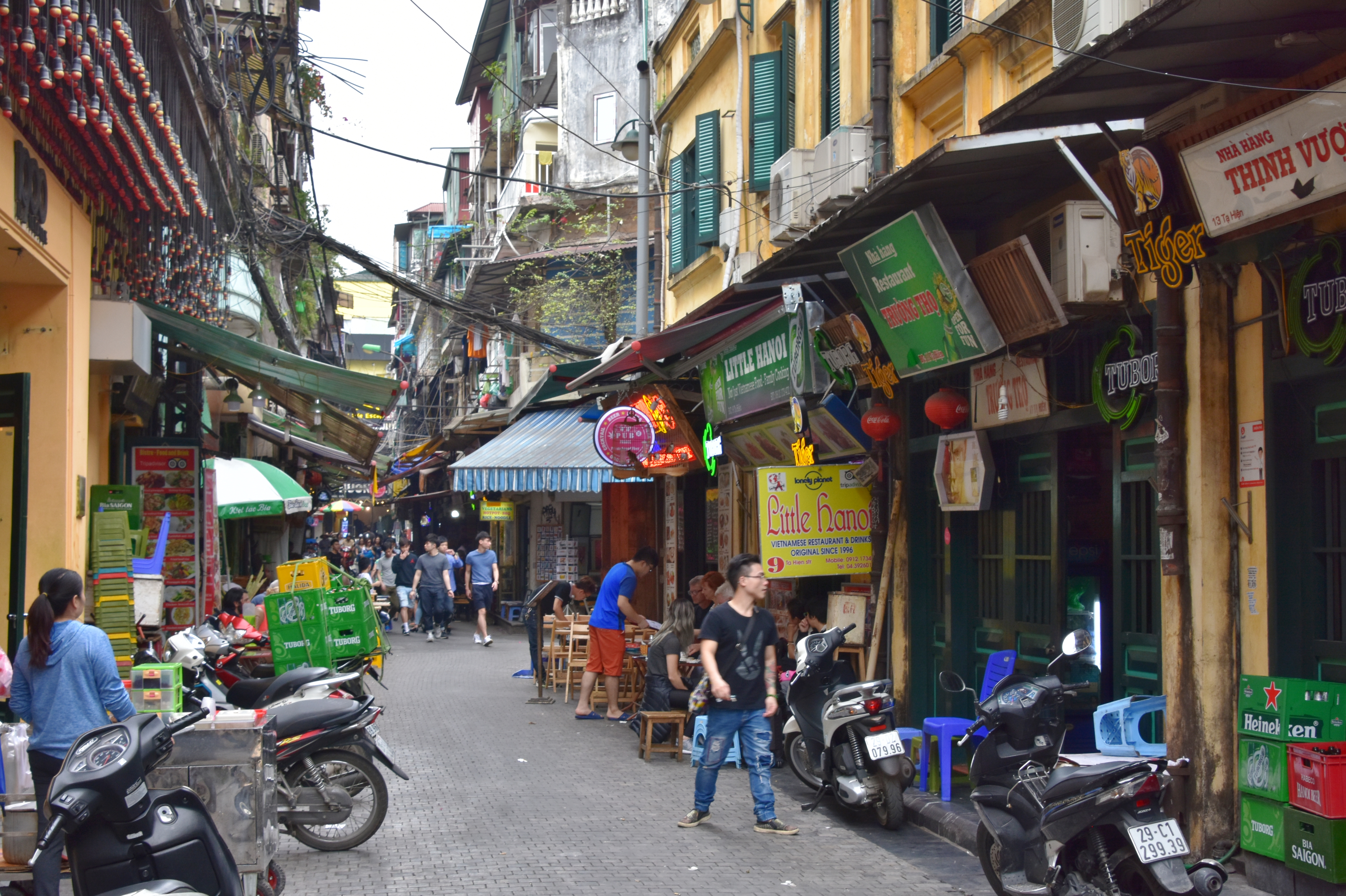

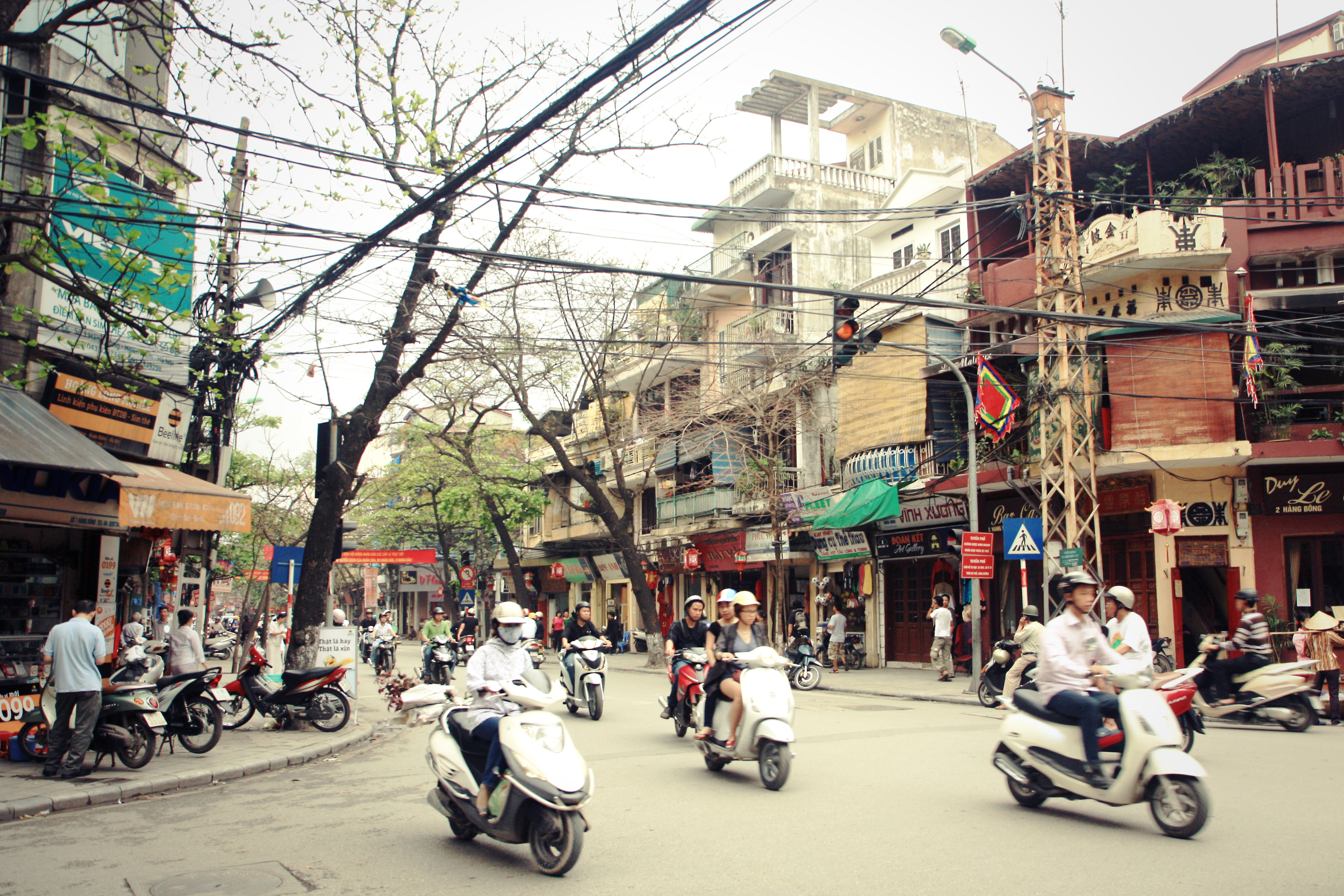

== See also ==
- Timeline of Hanoi
