= St. Joseph's Cathedral, Hanoi =

Church in Vietnam

St. Joseph's Cathedral Nhà thờ Chính tòa Thánh Giuse Cathédrale Saint-Joseph d'Hanoï
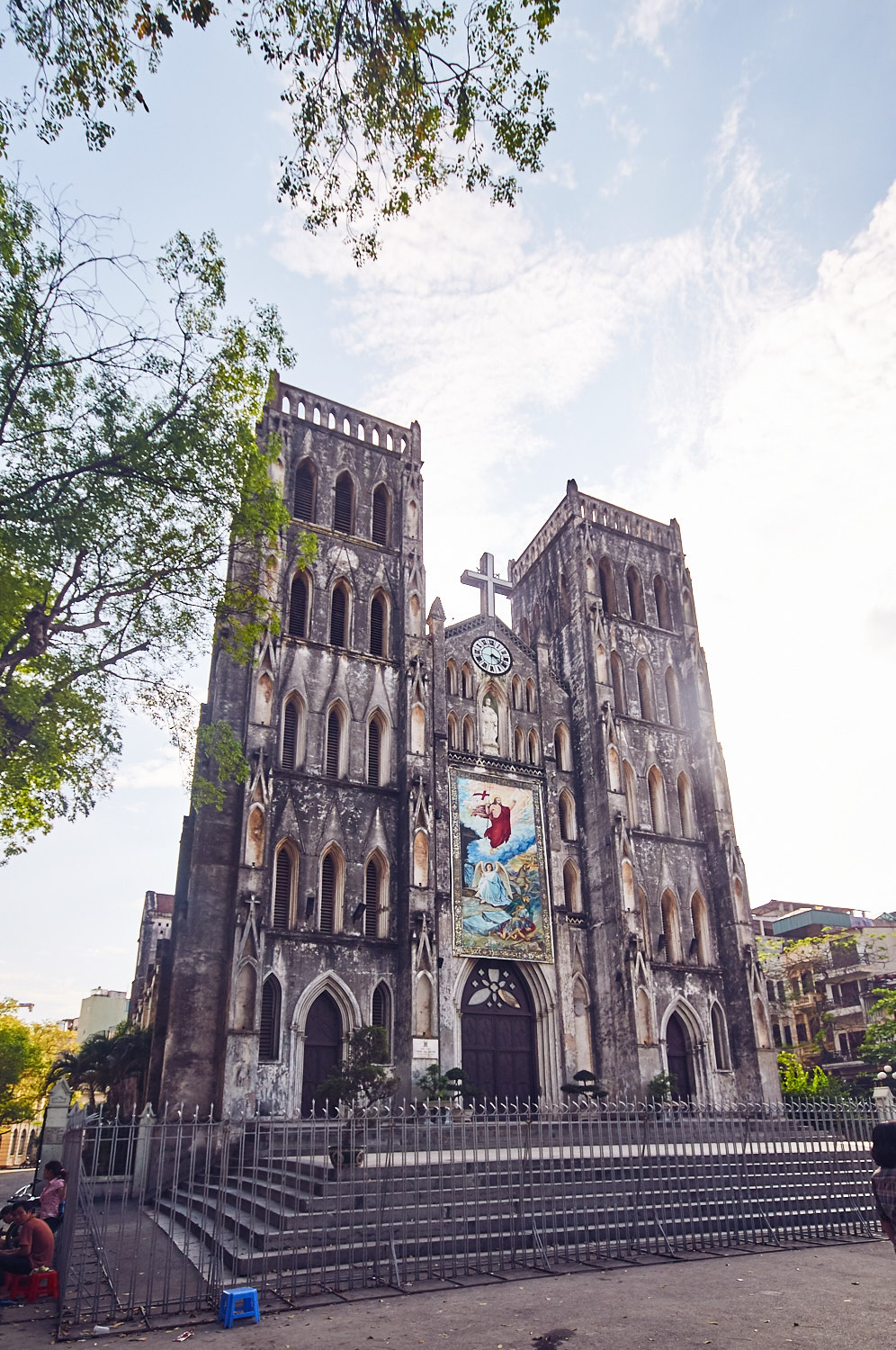
- St. Joseph's Cathedral; Nhà thờ Chính tòa Thánh Giuse; Cathédrale Saint-Joseph d'Hanoï
- 21°1′43″N 105°50′56″E
- Location: Nhà Chung Street, Hoàn Kiếm District, Hanoi
- Country: Vietnam
- Denomination: Roman Catholic

History
- Status: Cathedral
- Dedication: Saint Joseph
- Consecrated: December 24, 1886

Architecture
- Functional status: Active
- Style: Gothique revival
- Groundbreaking
- Completed: December 1886; 139 years ago

Administration
- Archdiocese: Roman Catholic Archdiocese of Hanoi

Clergy
- Archbishop: Joseph Vũ Văn Thiên

St. Joseph's Cathedral (Vietnamese: Nhà thờ Lớn Hà Nội lit. 'Grand Cathedral of Hanoi', Nhà thờ Chính tòa Thánh Giuse; French: Cathédrale Saint-Joseph d'Hanoï) is a Catholic church on Nhà Chung Street, in the Hoàn Kiếm District of Hanoi, Vietnam. It is a late 19th-century Gothic Revival (Neo-Gothic style) church that serves as the cathedral of the Roman Catholic Archdiocese of Hanoi. The cathedral is named after Joseph, the patron saint of Vietnam.

Construction began in 1884, with an architectural style resembling the Notre Dame de Paris. The church was one of the first structures built by the colonial government of French Indochina when it opened in December, 1886 and is the oldest church in Hanoi.

Mass is celebrated in the cathedral several times during the day. For the Sunday Mass at 6:00 PM, large crowds spill out into the streets. Prayers and hymns are broadcast to the plaza outside; Catholics who are unable to enter the cathedral congregate in the street and listen to hymns.

== Geography ==
The cathedral is situated west of Hoàn Kiếm Lake, in a small square within the Old Quarter. Located at the end of the Nhà Thờ Street and the corner of Nhà Chung Street, is an upscale market area with boutiques and silks, popular with tourists as well as restaurants and small apartment blocks. The cathedral is also the headquarters of Archdiocese of Vietnam; it controls over 480 churches and chapels and 113 parishes, and serves 400,000 Catholics. The cathedral's main gates are generally only opened during Mass; at other times, entry is allowed through a side door in the compound wall of the diocese, after which a bell can be rung to enter the cathedral proper.

== History ==
In November 1873, acting in support of the French trader Jean Dupuis, French troops under the command of Lieutenant Francis Garnier captured the Hanoi Citadel, before conquering the rest of the city. A decade passed before the colonists gained full control of Hanoi due to rebel insurgencies. Construction of the cathedral most likely started after this time and it was completed in December 1886, a year before the federation of French Indochina was established as part of its colonial empire. It was built by the French missionary and apostolic vicar of West Tonkin Paul-François Puginier, who obtained permission from the colonial French administration. It was built on the abandoned site of Báo Thiên Pagoda. This location was part of an "administrative center" of Tonkin before the French colonial era. In order to facilitate the construction of the church, the ruins of the pagoda - which was built when the city was founded by the 11th-century Lý dynasty and had collapsed in 1542, never to be repaired - were cleared. The cathedral was consecrated on December 24, 1886.

After the Viet Minh took control of North Vietnam following the Geneva Accords in 1954, the Catholic Church suffered decades of persecution. Priests were arrested, and church property was seized and expropriated. St. Joseph's Cathedral was not spared; it was closed down until Christmas Eve of 1990, when Mass was permitted to be celebrated there again. In 2008, protests related to religious symbols occurred at the lot next to the cathedral.

== Architecture ==
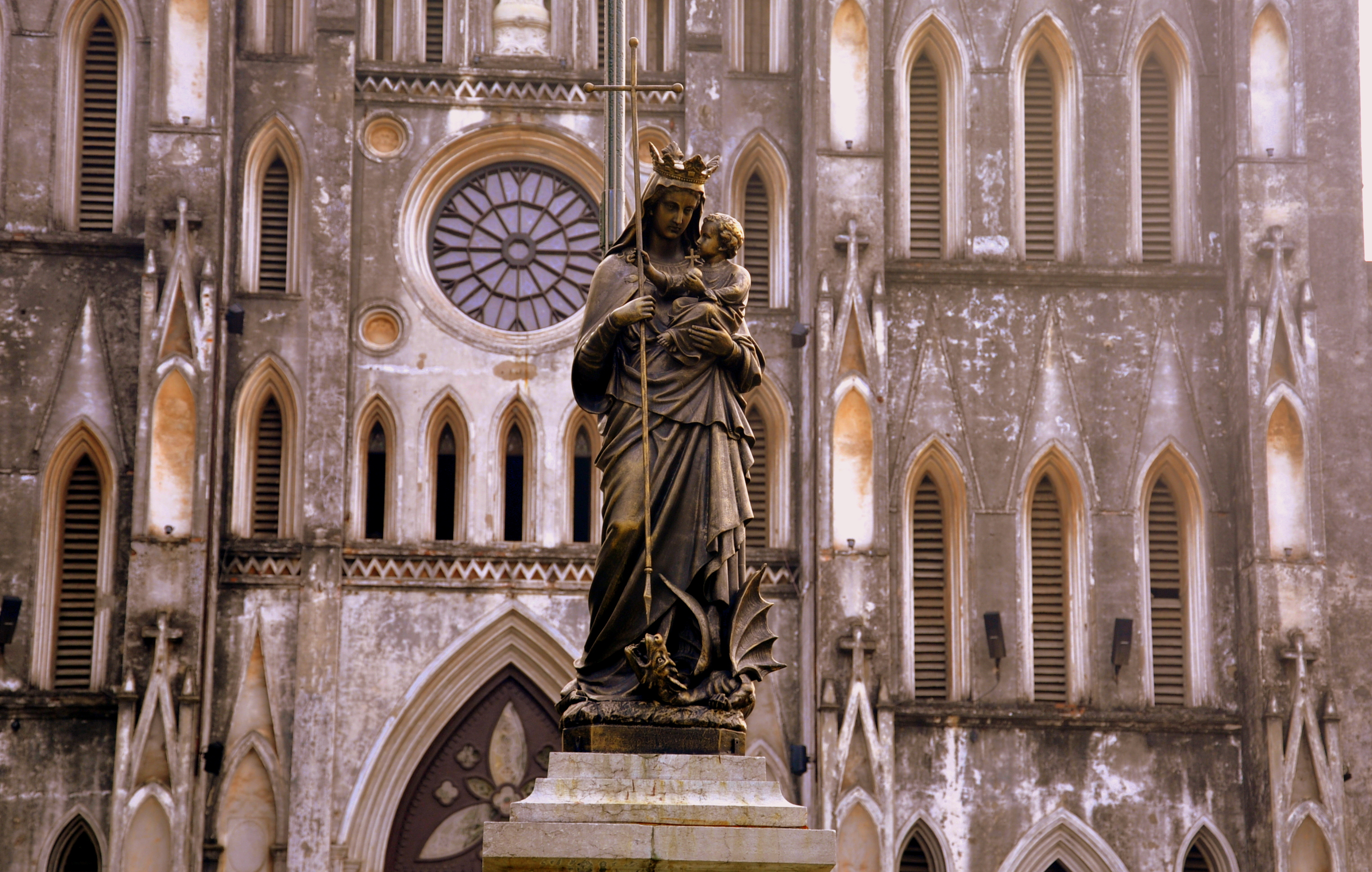
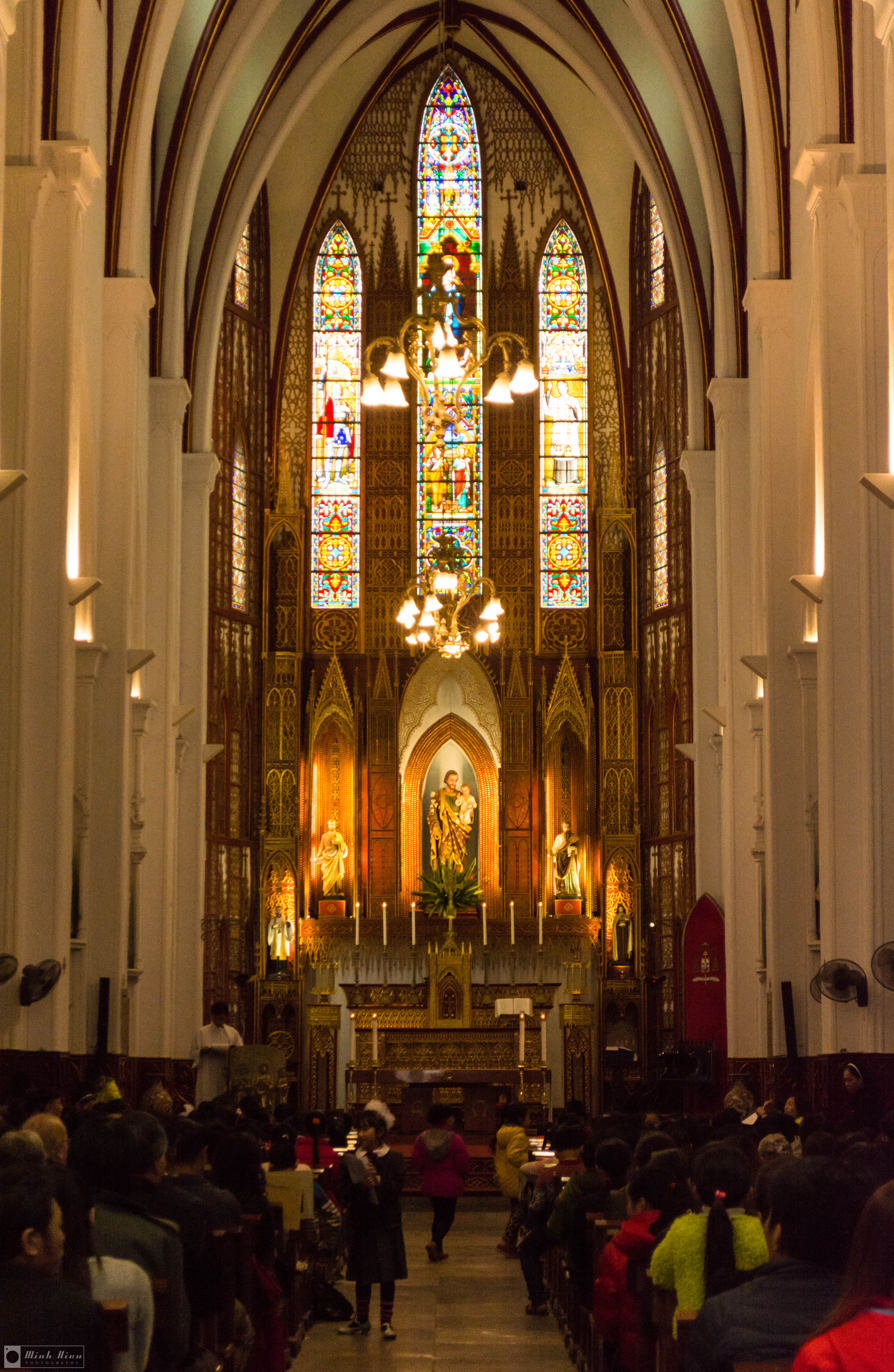
Left: Statue of Regina Pacis (Queen of Peace) at the front of St. Joseph's Cathedral. Right: Interior view towards the altar and sanctuary of the cathedral.

=== Exterior ===
Built with stone slabs and in brick with concrete facing, the façade consists of two towers, square in shape, rising to a height of 103 ft (31 m), with each tower fitted with five bells. The cathedral was built in a Gothic Revival (Neo-Gothic) style. The twin bell towers have often drawn comparison to those at Notre Dame de Paris; the architects of St. Joseph's sought to emulate its Parisian counterpart. The exterior walls of the church are made of granite stone slabs. Over the years, the cathedral's exterior has become severely worn down due to heavy pollution. In response, the cathedral underwent major renovation works between July 2020 and May 2022, restoring its external appearance and structural integrity.

=== Interior ===
Windows are fitted with tall stained glass and have pointed arches. The cathedral's stained glass windows were produced in France before being transported to Vietnam. The ceiling is rib-vaulted like those seen in medieval Europe. The nave is weathered, while the sanctuary is made of polished gilt-trimmed wood, similar to that of Phát Diệm Cathedral, and has architectural embellishments in the traditional imperial style. A statue of the Virgin Mary is kept in a palanquin according to local custom, which is seen to the left of the nave. A pipe organ designed by the Belgian craftsman Guido Schumacher, was installed in the cathedral on 23 November 2022, after it was donated by the city of Itami in Hyōgo Prefecture, Japan. It was originally for the city's senior citizens and manufactured as part of a cultural exchange project between Itami and its sister city of Hasselt in Limburg Province, Belgium. The instrument has 1,850 pipes.

== See also ==
- Basilica of the Immaculate Conception of Sở Kiện
- Notre-Dame Cathedral Basilica of Saigon
- Catholic Church in Vietnam
