= Yên Hòa =

Yên Hòa Ward Phường Yên Hòa Xã Yên Hòa
- Ward (Class-II)
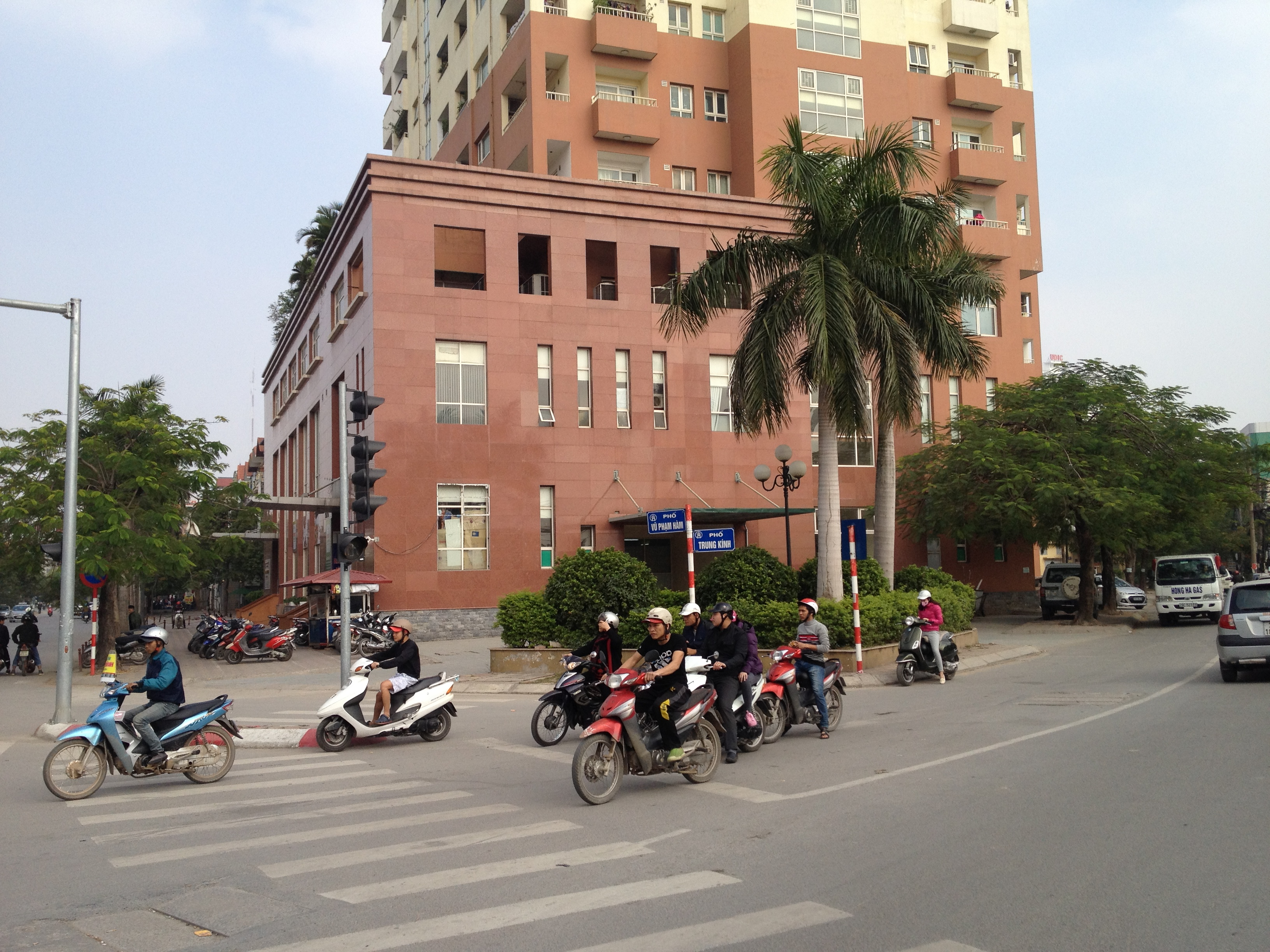
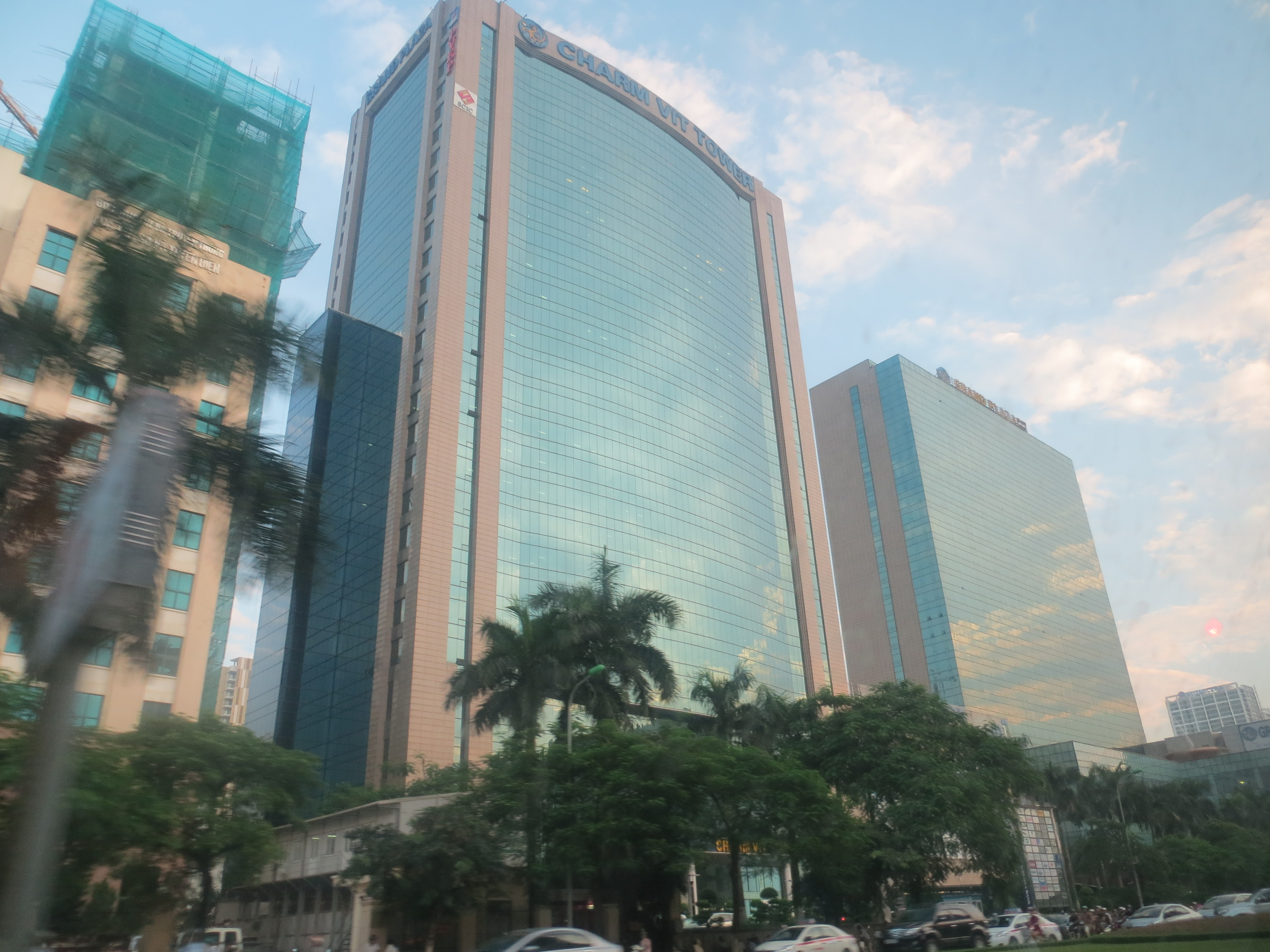
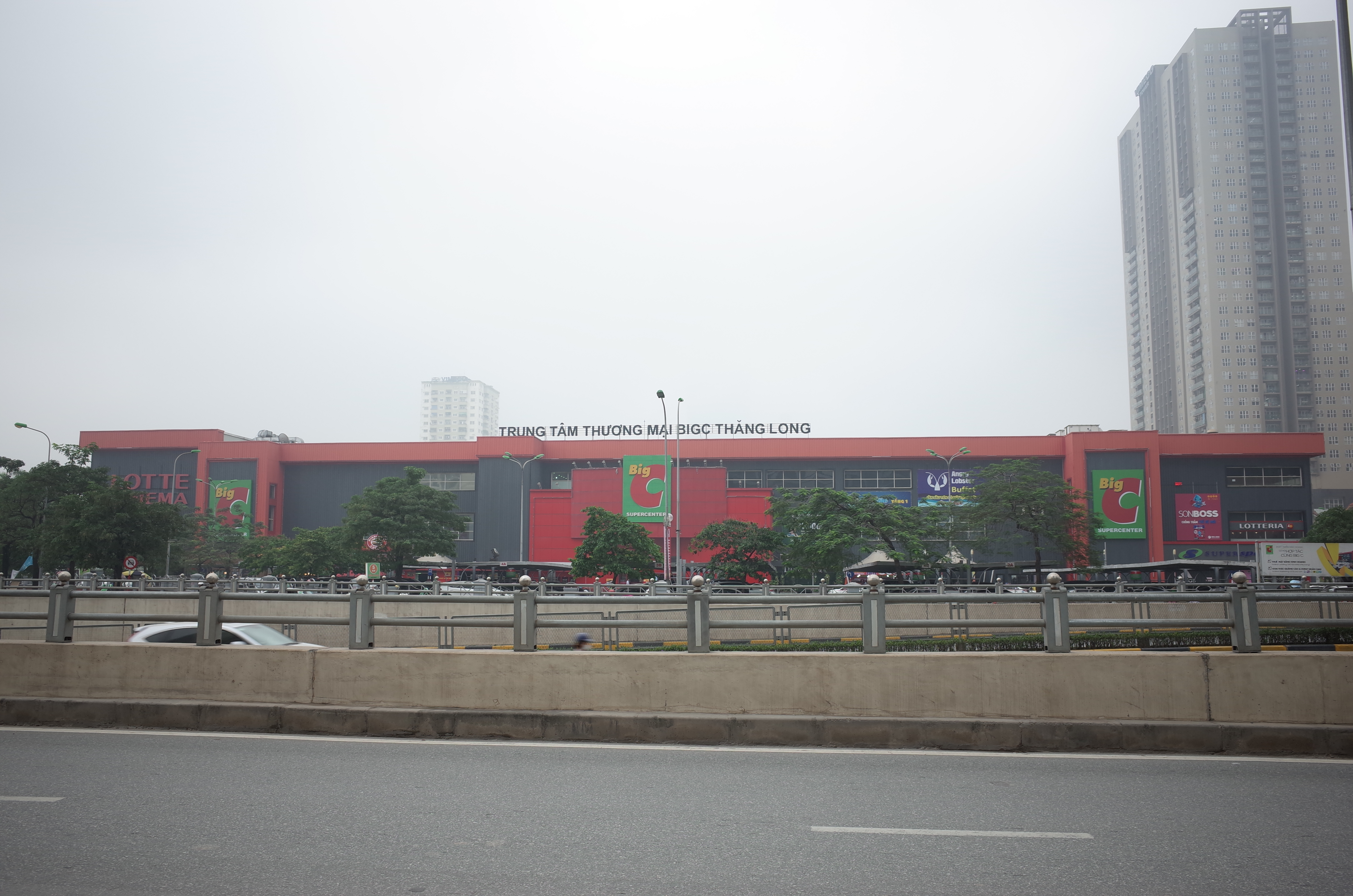
- From top, left to right : Trung Kính Hạ Temple at Trung Kính Street, Trung Yên 1 Apartment and Yên Hòa Parkview City at Vũ Phạm Hàm Street, Charm-Vit Tower and Thăng Long BigC Supercenter at Trần Duy Hưng Street.
- Nickname: "Làng Giàn" (Giàn Village)
- Interactive map of Yên Hòa Ward
- Location within Vietnam
- Country: Vietnam
- Region: Red River Delta
- Municipality: Hà Nội
- Establishment: 1949 (commune); September 1, 1997 (Note: Phường Yên Hòa chính thức đi vào hoạt động từ ngày 1/9/1997 theo Nghị Định 74/CP ngày 22/11/1996 của Chính Phủ trên cơ sở là xã Yên Hòa, huyện Từ Liêm (cũ).) (ward)
- Central hall: No.231, Nguyễn Ngọc Vũ Street, Yên Hòa Ward

Government
  - Type: Ward-level authority
  - People Committee's Chairman: Trịnh Thị Dung
  - People Council's Chairman: Nguyễn Quốc Khánh
  - Front Committee's Chairman: Trần Cẩm Anh
  - Party Committee's Secretary: Nguyễn Quốc Khánh

Area
  - Total: 4.10 km^{2} (1.58 sq mi)

Population (July 1, 2025)
  - Total: 77,029
  - Density: 18,800/km^{2} (48,700/sq mi)
  - Ethnicities: Kinh; Tanka; Others
- Time zone: UTC+7 (Indochina Time)
- ZIP code: 10000–11312 (Note: An official code from December 31, 2022, to present.)
- Climate: Cwa
- Website: Yenhoa.Hanoi.gov.vn; Yenhoa.Hanoi.dcs.vn

Yên Hòa [iən˧˧:hwa̤ː˨˩] is a ward of Hanoi the capital city in the Red River Delta of Vietnam.

== History ==
Its name Yên Hòa (Hán: 安和, Nôm: 𭴣和) is originally a combination of seven localities that have many cultural traditions in urban Hanoi : Hòa Mục (or Nhân Hòa), Trung Hòa (or Trung Kính Thượng), Trung Kính (or Đàn Kính Chủ), Trung Yên (or Trung Kính Hạ), Yên Hòa, Yên Lãng, and especially Yên Quyết (or Bạch Liên Hoa).

The modern area of Yên Hòa Ward is two former administrative units with a very long history : Kẻ Cót Village (Hạ Yên Quyết Village) and Kẻ Giàn Village (Đàn Kính Chủ Village). Their remaining relics is an old communal hall called Trung Kính Hạ.

=== Middle Ages ===
According to Đồng Khánh địa dư chí lược (同慶地輿志略), around the late years of Gia Long, the Southwestern area of Hà Nội Citadel still belonged to Từ Liêm rural district, Quốc Oai prefecture, Sơn Tây garrisons of the Northern Citadel region (Note: Bắc Thành.).

By 1831, Emperor Minh Mệnh issued an Order (Note: Đạo dụ.) to eliminate the Ming-style "garrisons" regime to switch to the Qing-style "province" regime. Since then, Từ Liêm district has been part of Hoài Đức prefecture of Hà Nội province. In particular, the area of this district-level administrative unit consisted of 5 villages from its North to South and West to East side : Yên Quyết (Kẻ Cót), Dịch Vọng (Kẻ Vòng), Mễ Trì (Kẻ Mẩy), Yên Lãng (Kẻ Láng), Đàn Kính Chủ (Kẻ Giàn). These administrative systems and names have remained the same until the end of the 1950s by many different governments.

=== 20th century ===
In 1961, in the process of expanding the area of urban Hà Nội in the Southwest direction, most of those villages were merged into two urban districts V and VI, while Mễ Trì village became the commune of Từ Liêm rural district. Four merged villages have been raised to townships. Because at that time in the North Vietnam, there was no ward-level yet.

On November 22, 1996, the Government of Vietnam issued Decree 74-CP to establish Cầu Giấy urban district on the basis of the entire area and population of 4 former townships Cầu Giấy, Mai Dịch, Nghĩa Đô, Nghĩa Tân, and 3 communes Dịch Vọng, Trung Hòa, Yên Hòa, belonging to Từ Liêm district. In particular, Cầu Giấy township was renamed to Quan Hoa ward. When newly established, the district had 7 wards : Dịch Vọng, Mai Dịch, Nghĩa Đô, Nghĩa Tân, Quan Hoa, Trung Hòa, and Yên Hòa.

=== 21st century ===
On April 19, 2025, to realize the project to arrange and merge administrative units by the Government of Vietnam, the Hà Nội People's Committee quickly approved a Resolution on the plan of re-arranging commune+ward-level administrative units in the whole city.

According to the political document published for the press in the same day, Cầu Giấy Urban District was officially dissolved. Its entire area and population have been divided into three new wards Cầu Giấy 1 (Cầu Giấy), Cầu Giấy 2 (Nghĩa Đô), and Cầu Giấy 3 (Yên Hòa). From that reality, Yên Hòa Ward (安和坊, phường Yên Hòa) has been established based on the merging of :

- The entire natural area and population of two former wards Trung Hòa and Yên Hòa.
- The part of two former ward Mễ Trì (Nam Từ Liêm District) and Nhân Chính (Thanh Xuân District).

This has helped to double the size of the new administrative unit. Yên Hòa Ward is under the direct management of the Hà Nội City People's Committee.

== Geography ==
=== Topography ===
Yên Hòa Ward situates roughly to the Southwest area of urban Hanoi. According to the content of the planning map, what was given to households on 17 April 2025, the administrative unit called Cầu Giấy 3 or New Yên Hòa Ward is located in the South of Cầu Giấy Ward through Dương Đình Nghệ Street and the North of Thanh Xuân Ward through Lê Văn Lương Street. Its West is Từ Liêm Ward and a little of Đại Mỗ Ward, while its East is adjacent to the Tô Lịch River and connected to the other side of the 361 Bridge by Láng Ward.

Before 2013, 2/3 of the area of Yên Hòa Ward was still vegetable fields. However, since the Trần Duy Hưng Street has been completed and put into commercial exploitation, it has divided this ward into two little zones in Hanoi.

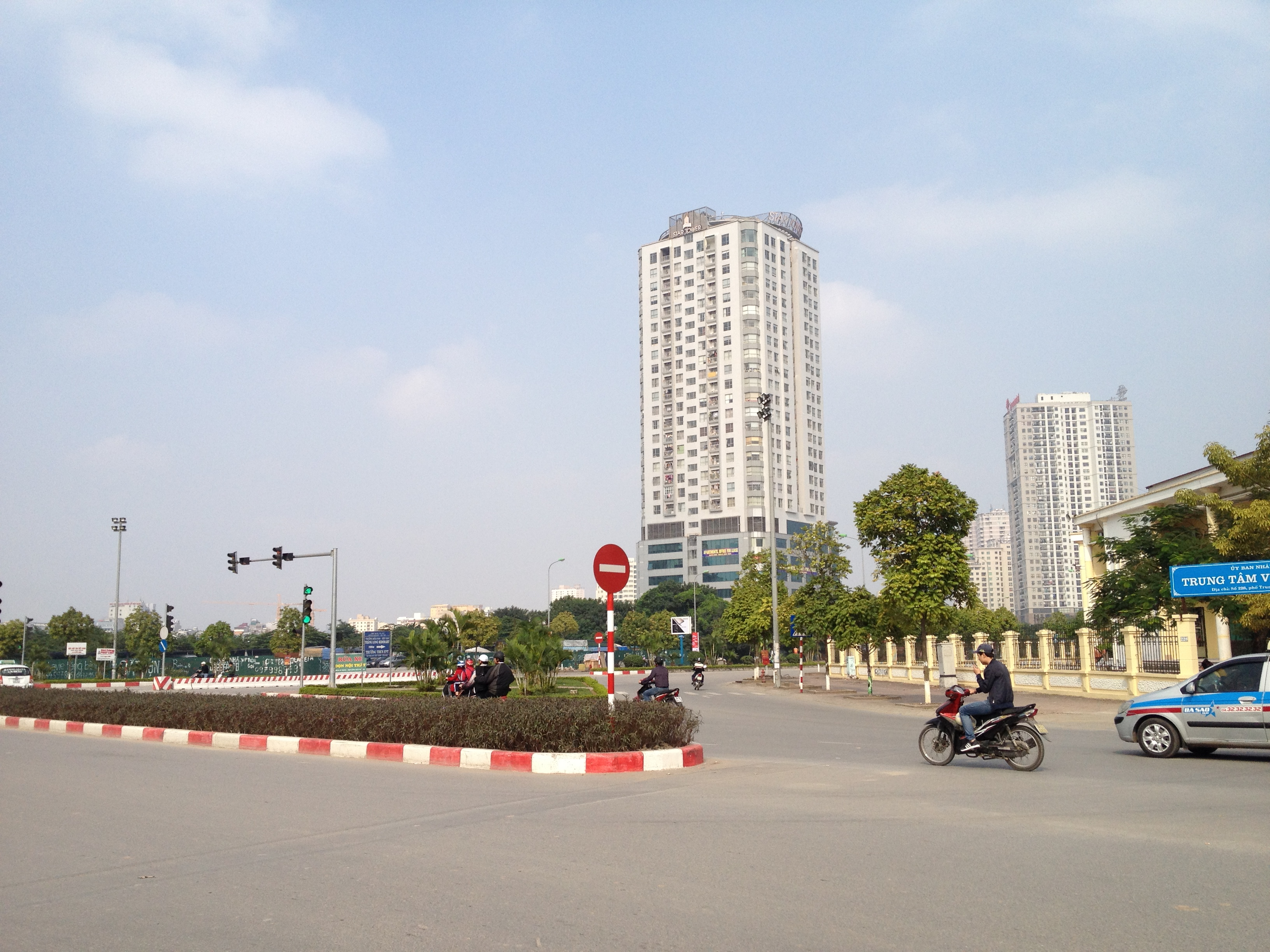
Dương Đình Nghệ Street along the Northern side of the ward

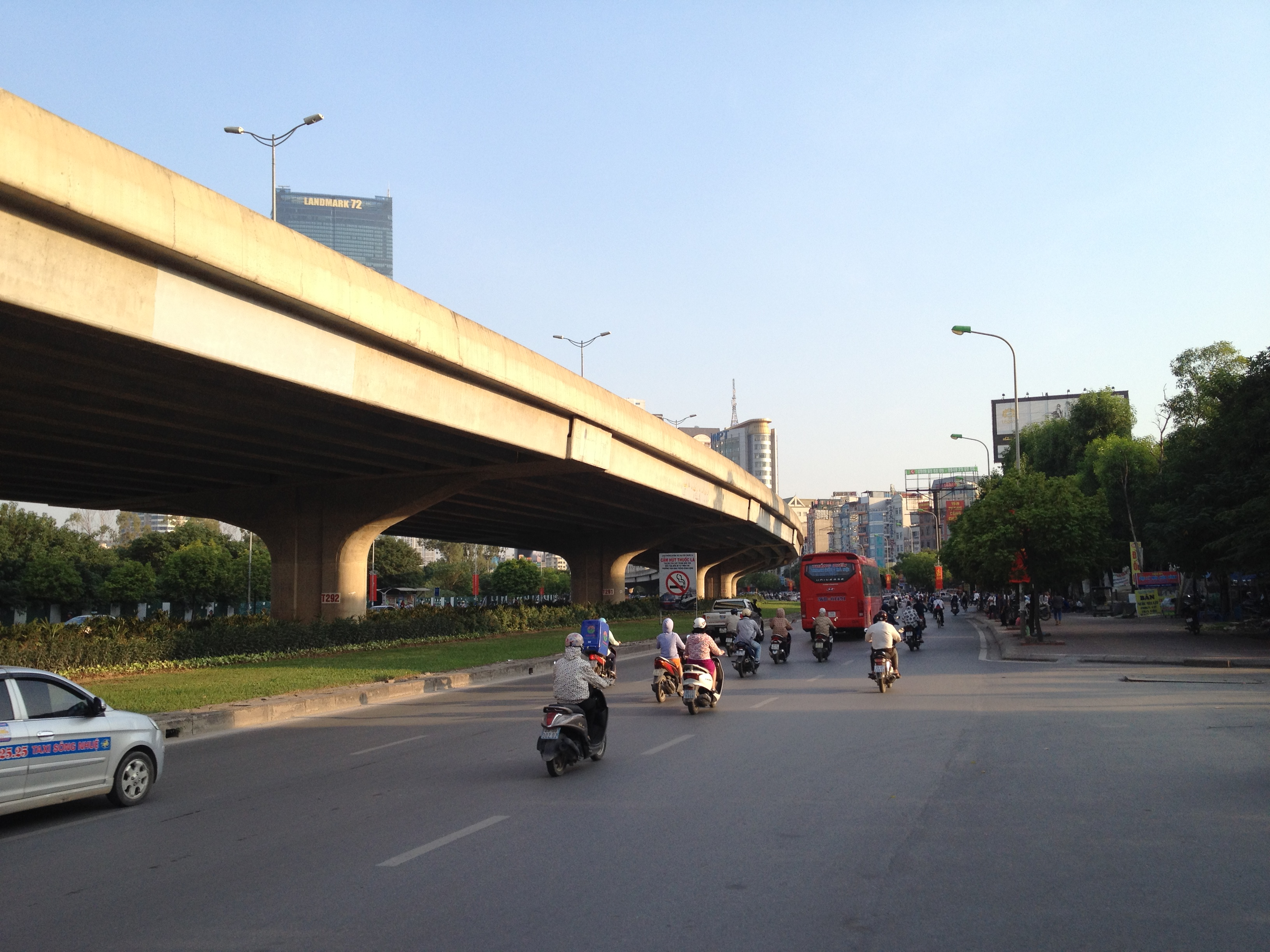
Phạm Hùng Street along the Western side of the ward

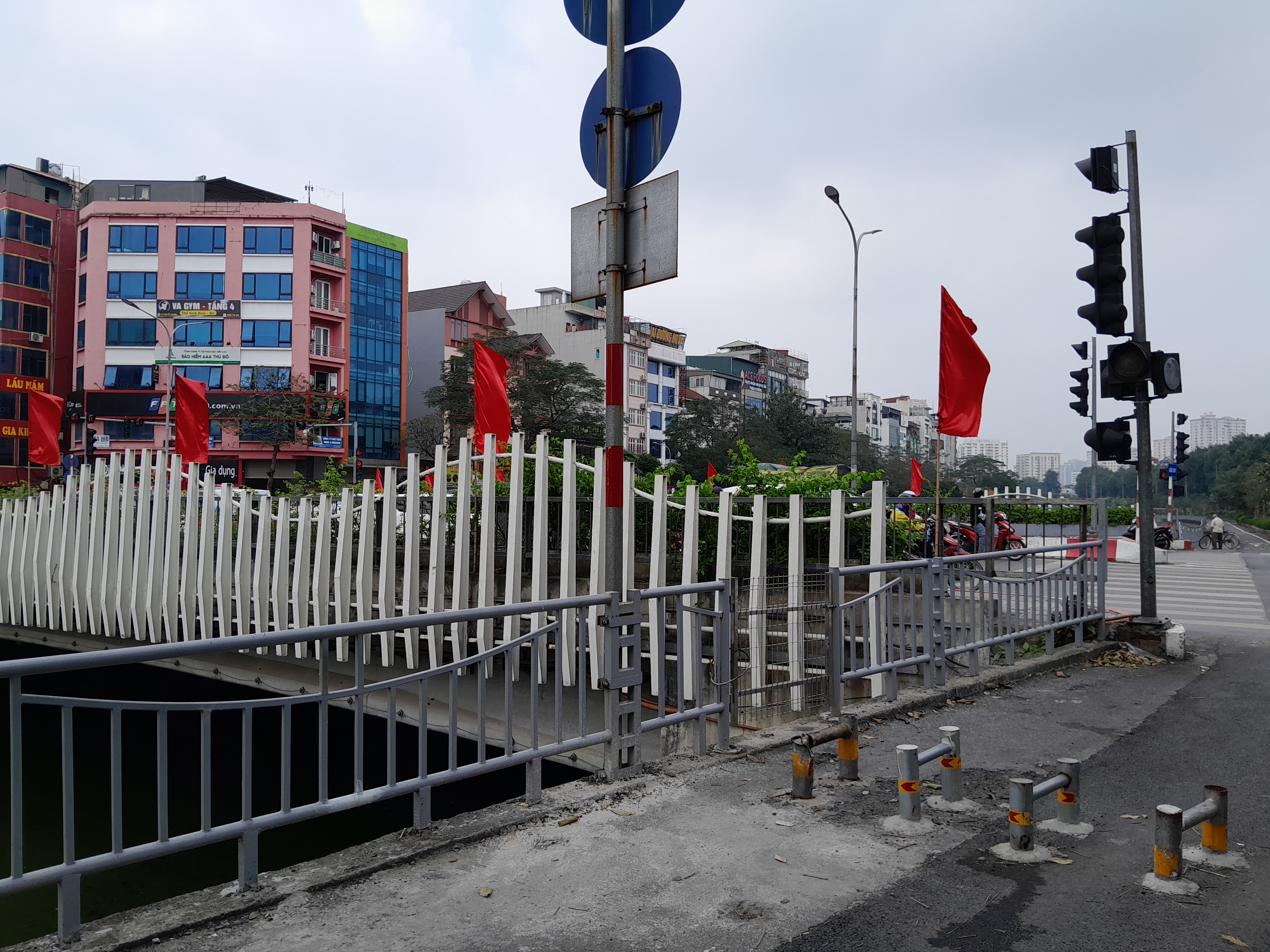
361 Bridge from Láng Boulevard to Vũ Phạm Hàm Street

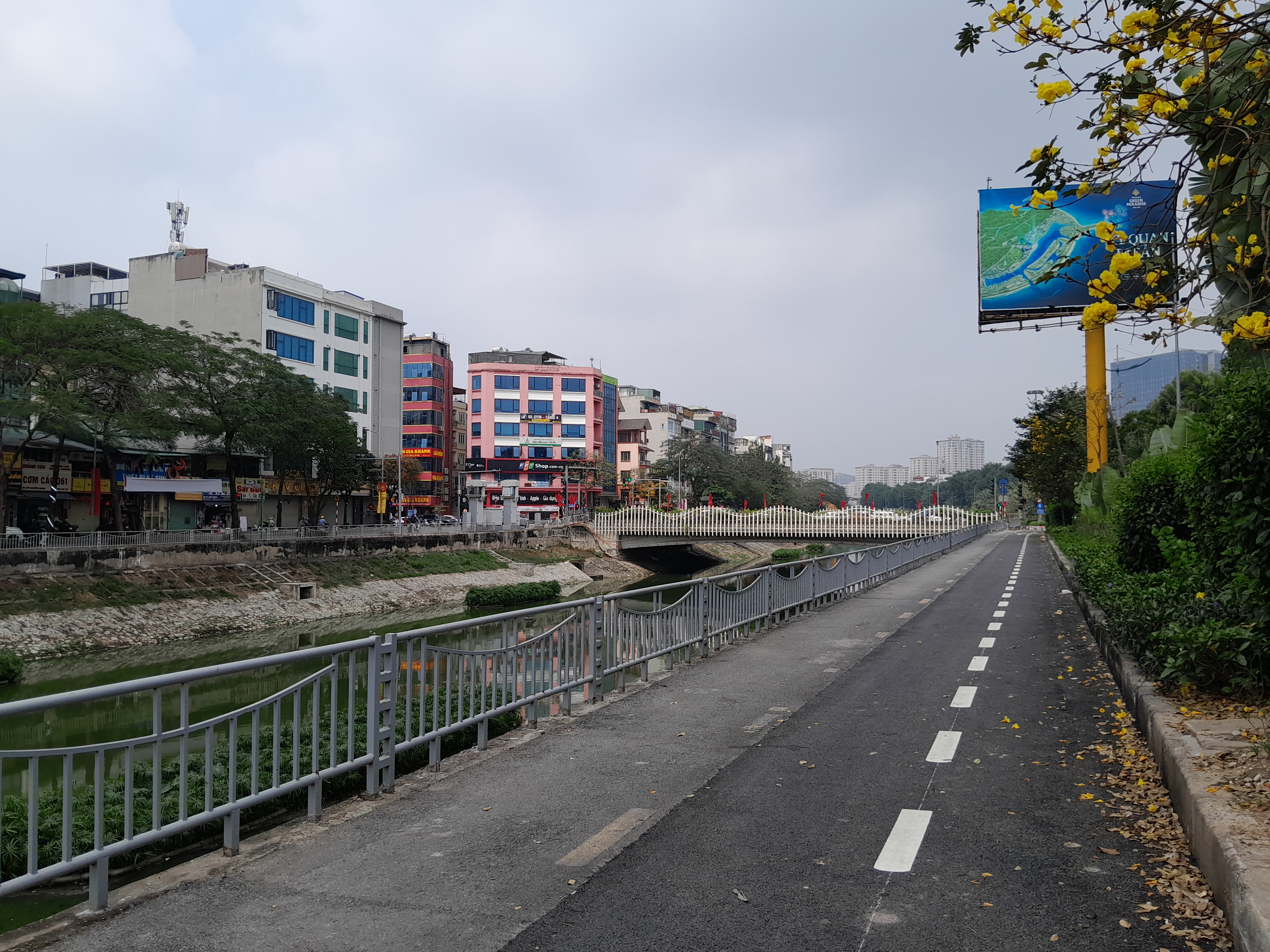
Tô Lịch Riverside Parks (Note: This system is made up of 4 smaller parks.) along the banks of Tô Lịch River

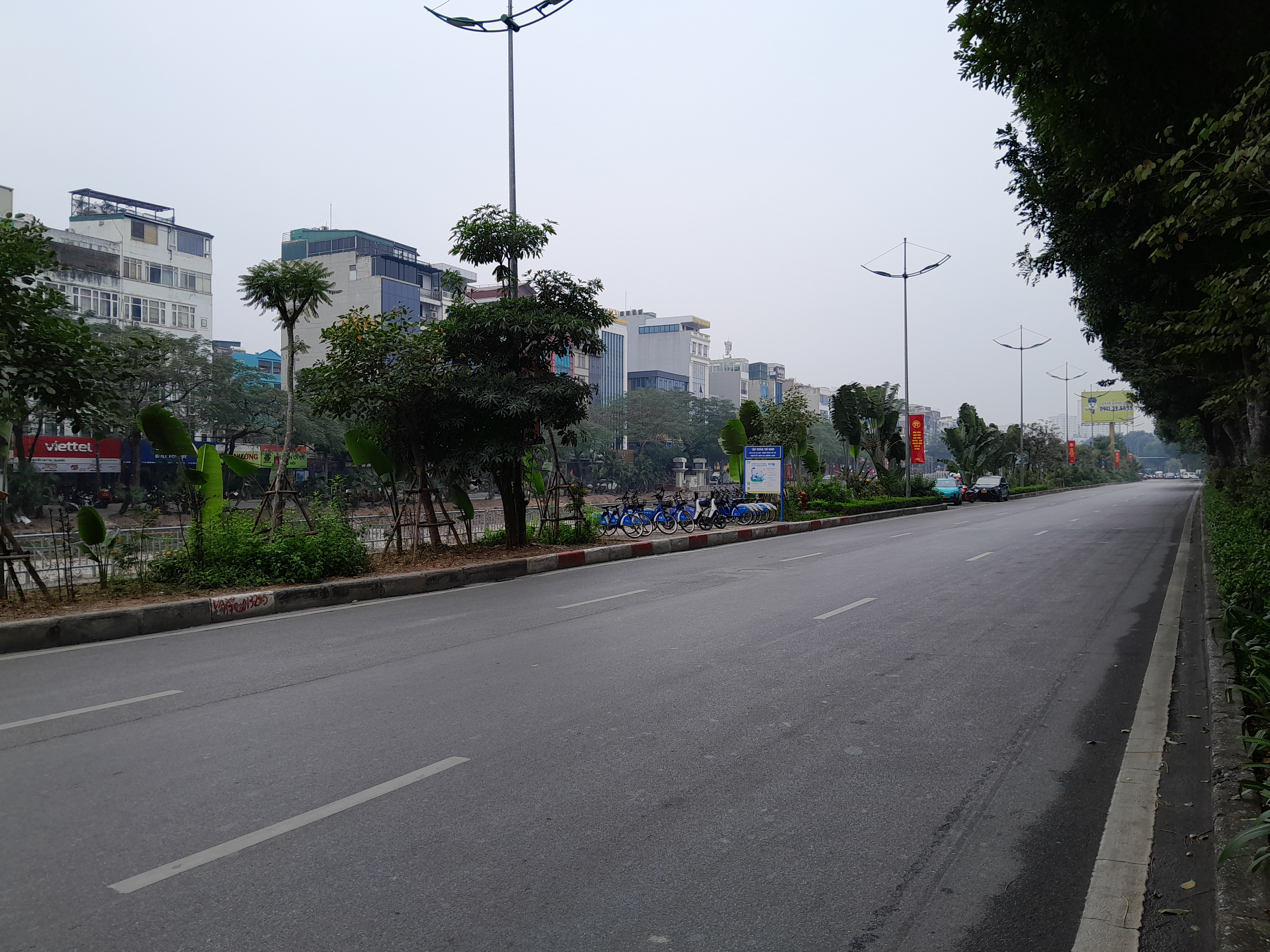
Láng Boulevard along the Eastern side of the ward

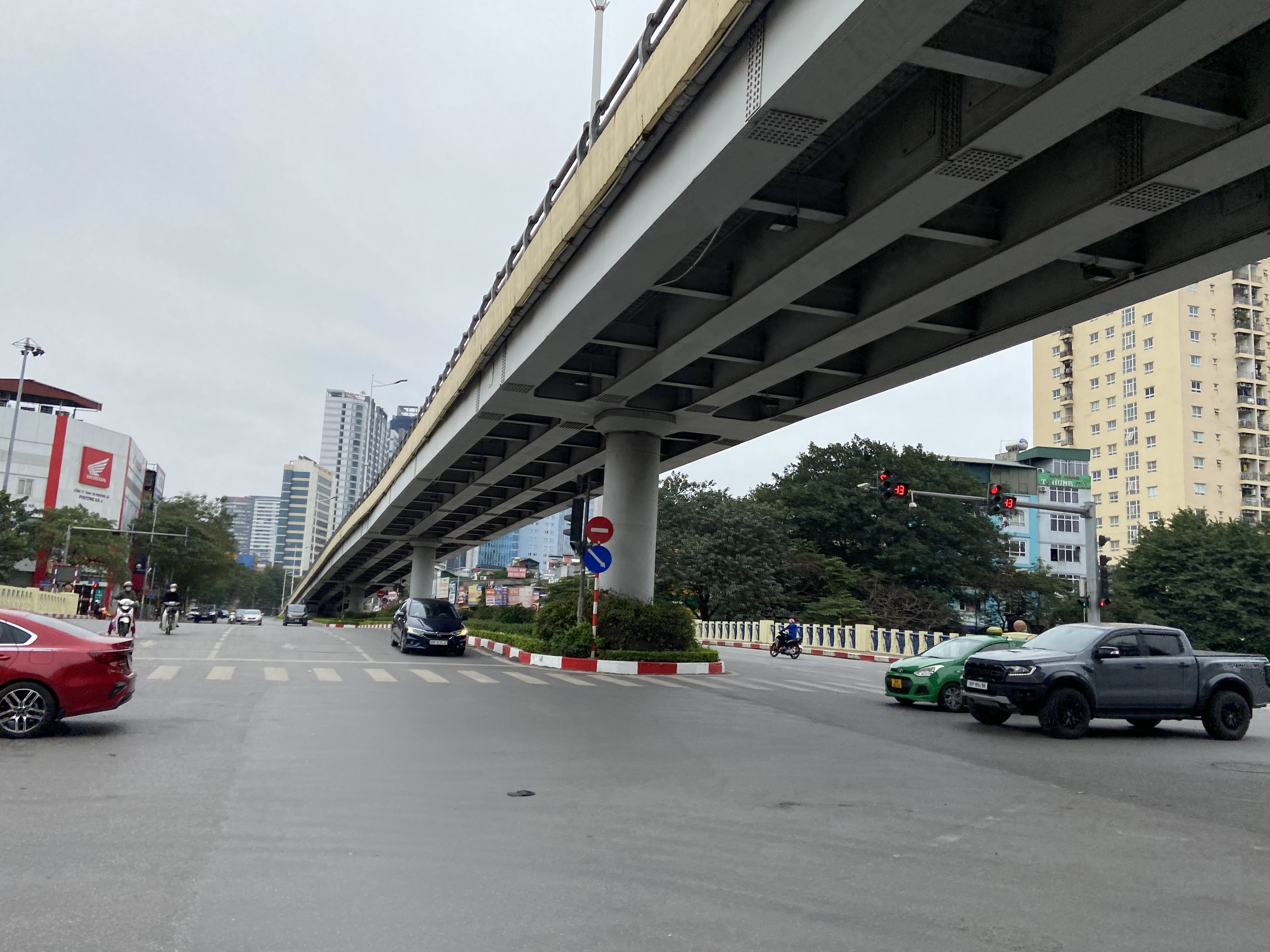
Lê Văn Lương Street along the Southern side of the ward

=== Natural space ===
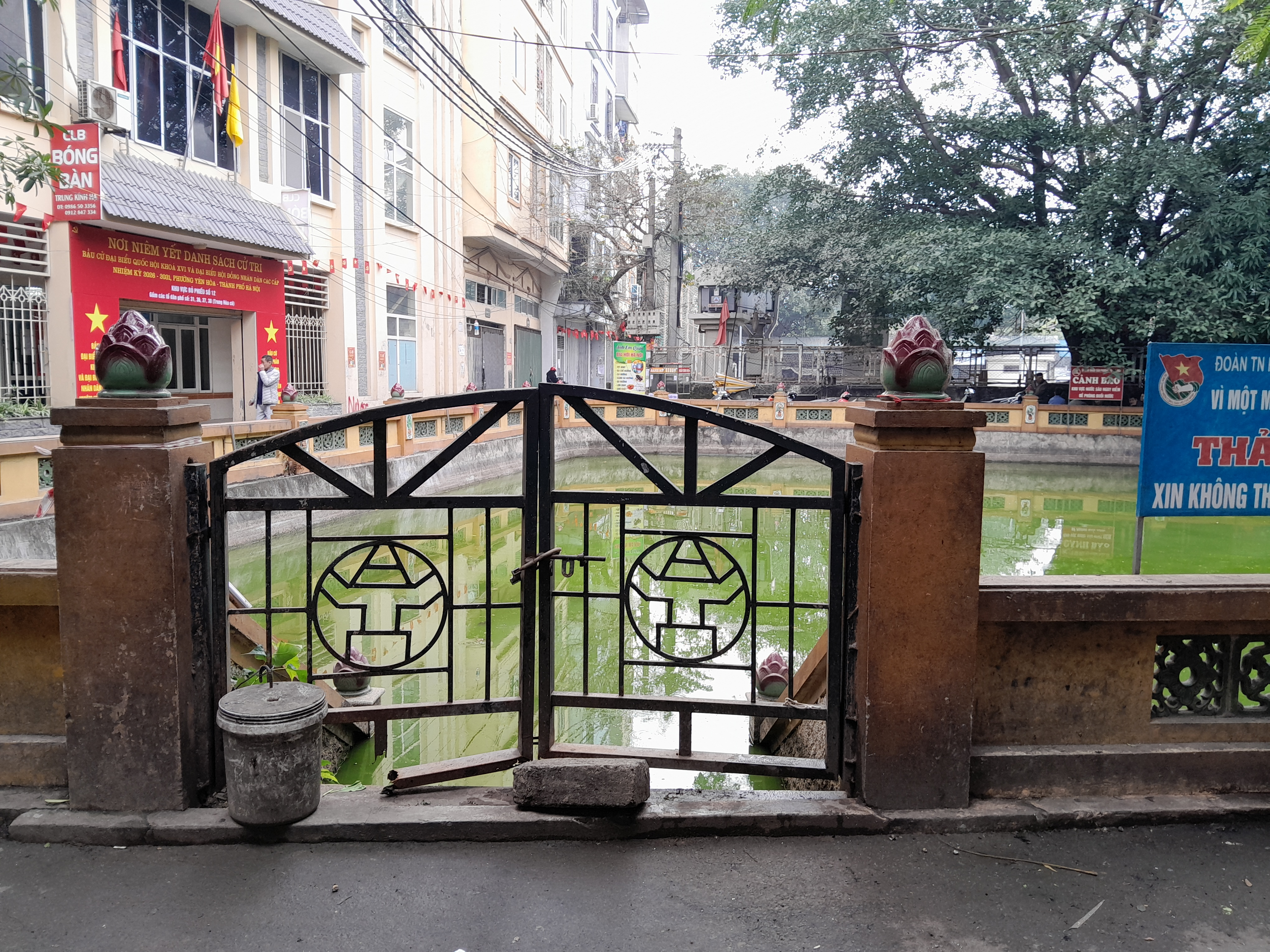
Tinh Hoa Pond

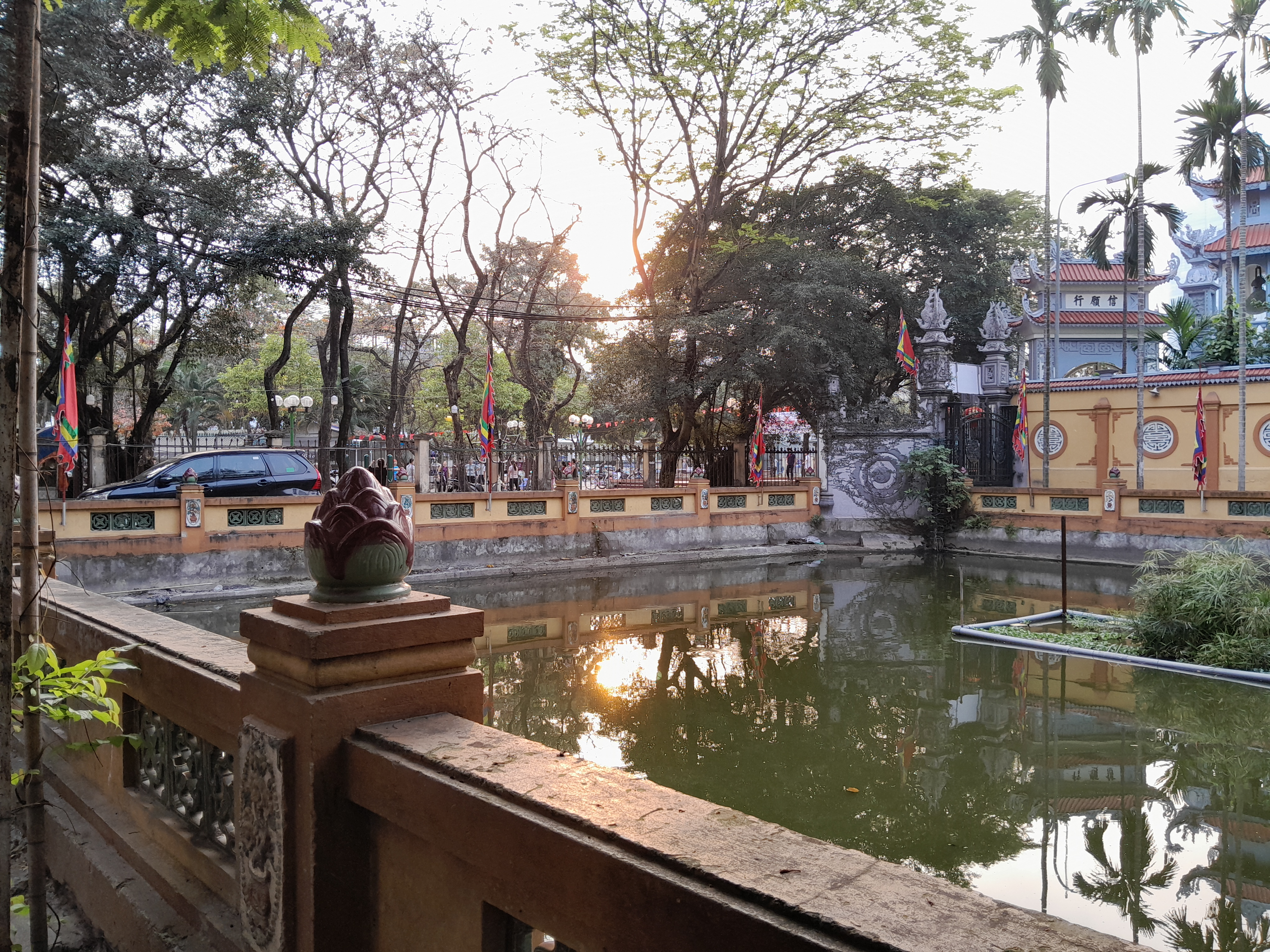
Nguyệt Hà Pond

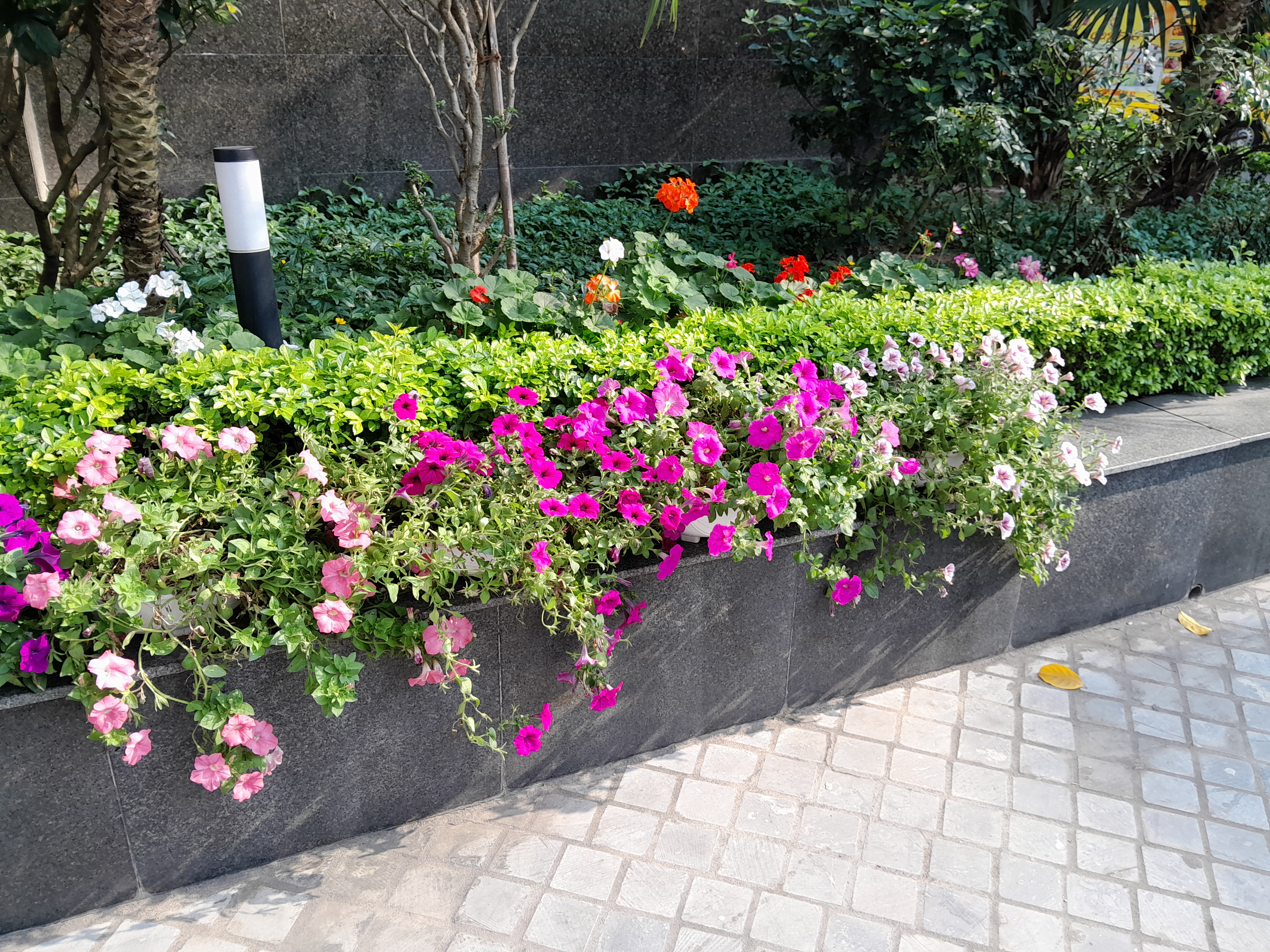
Round Quarter, YHPV

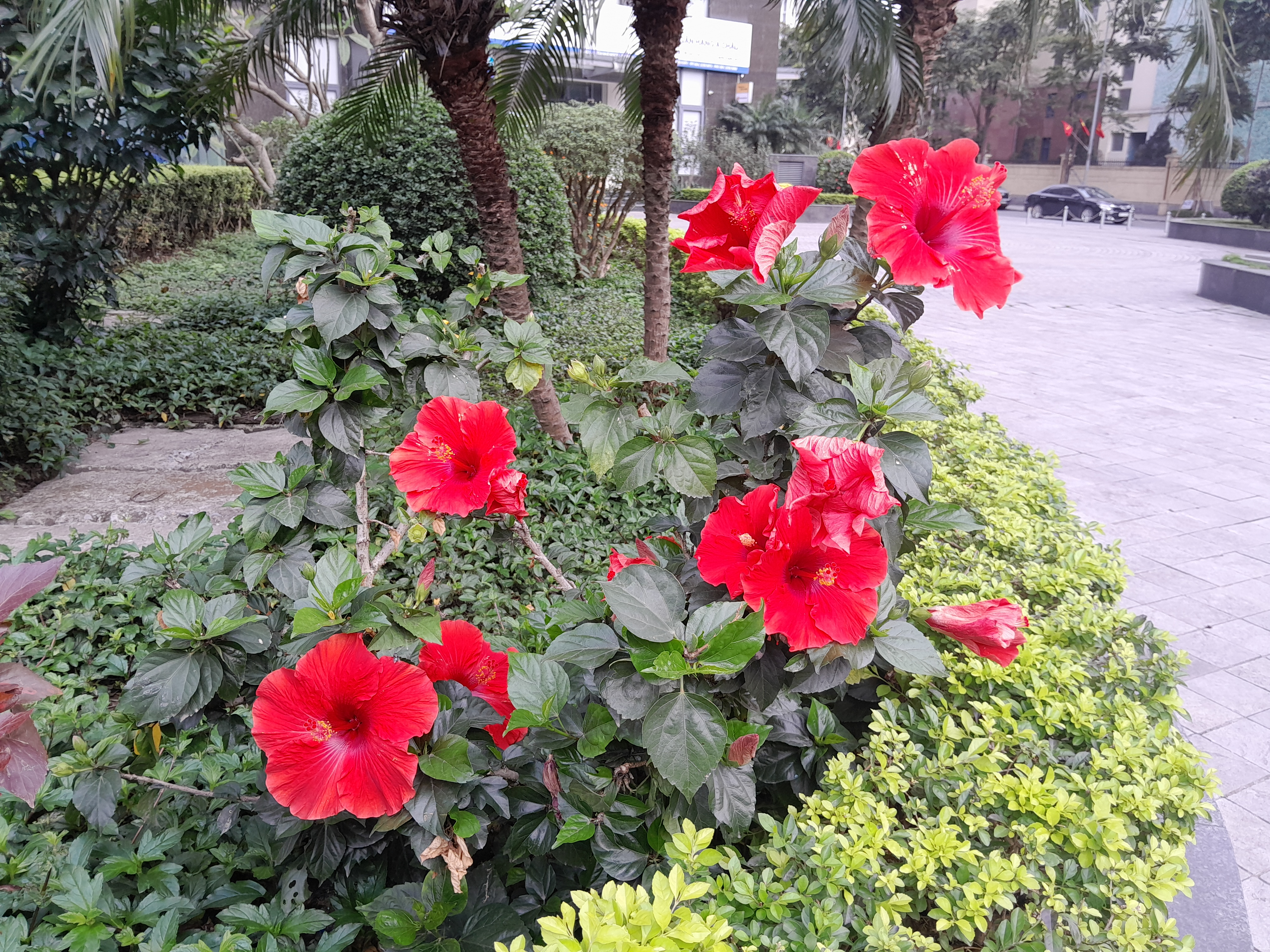
Rosy Quarter, YHPV

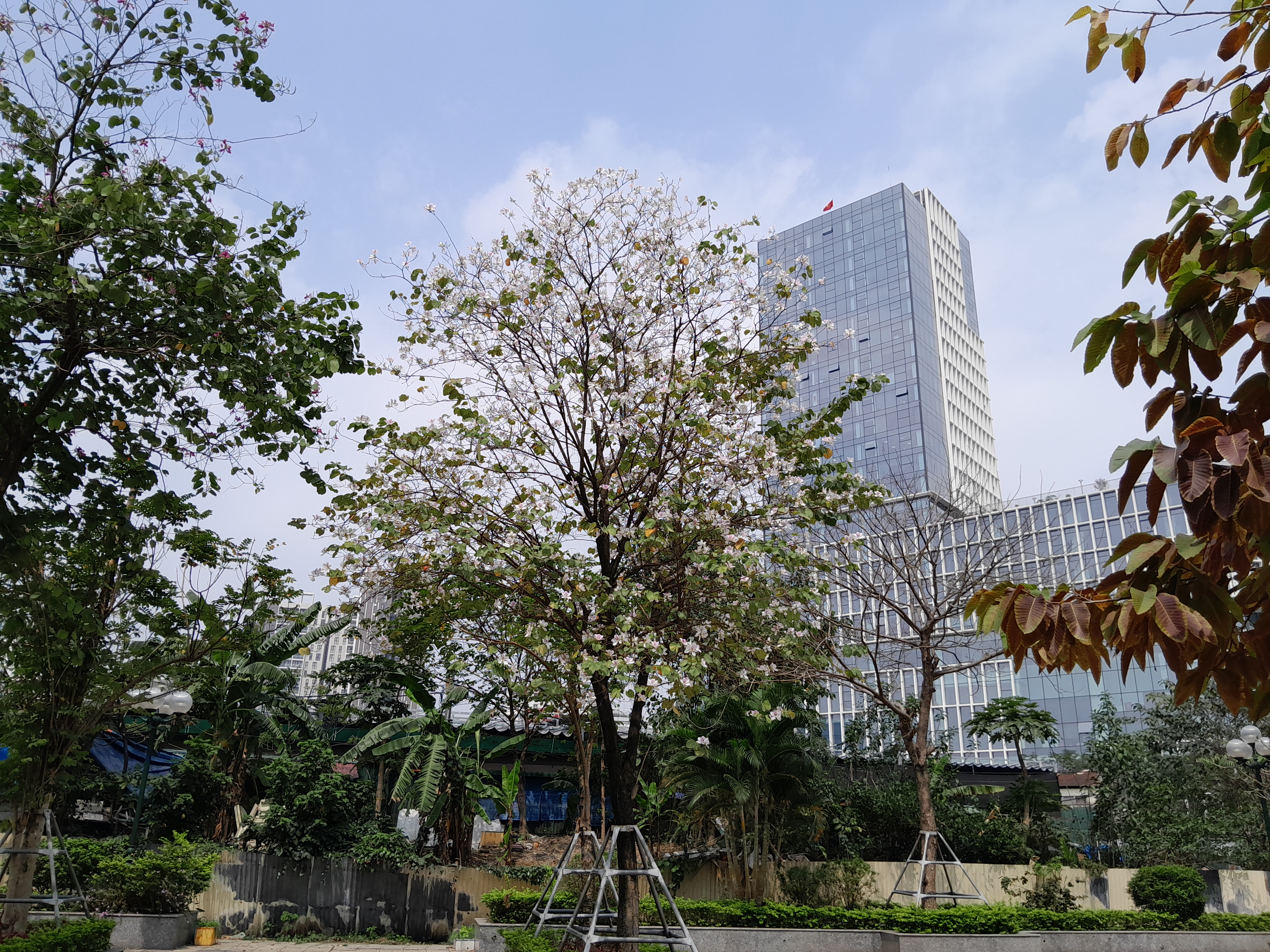
Golden Garden, YHPV

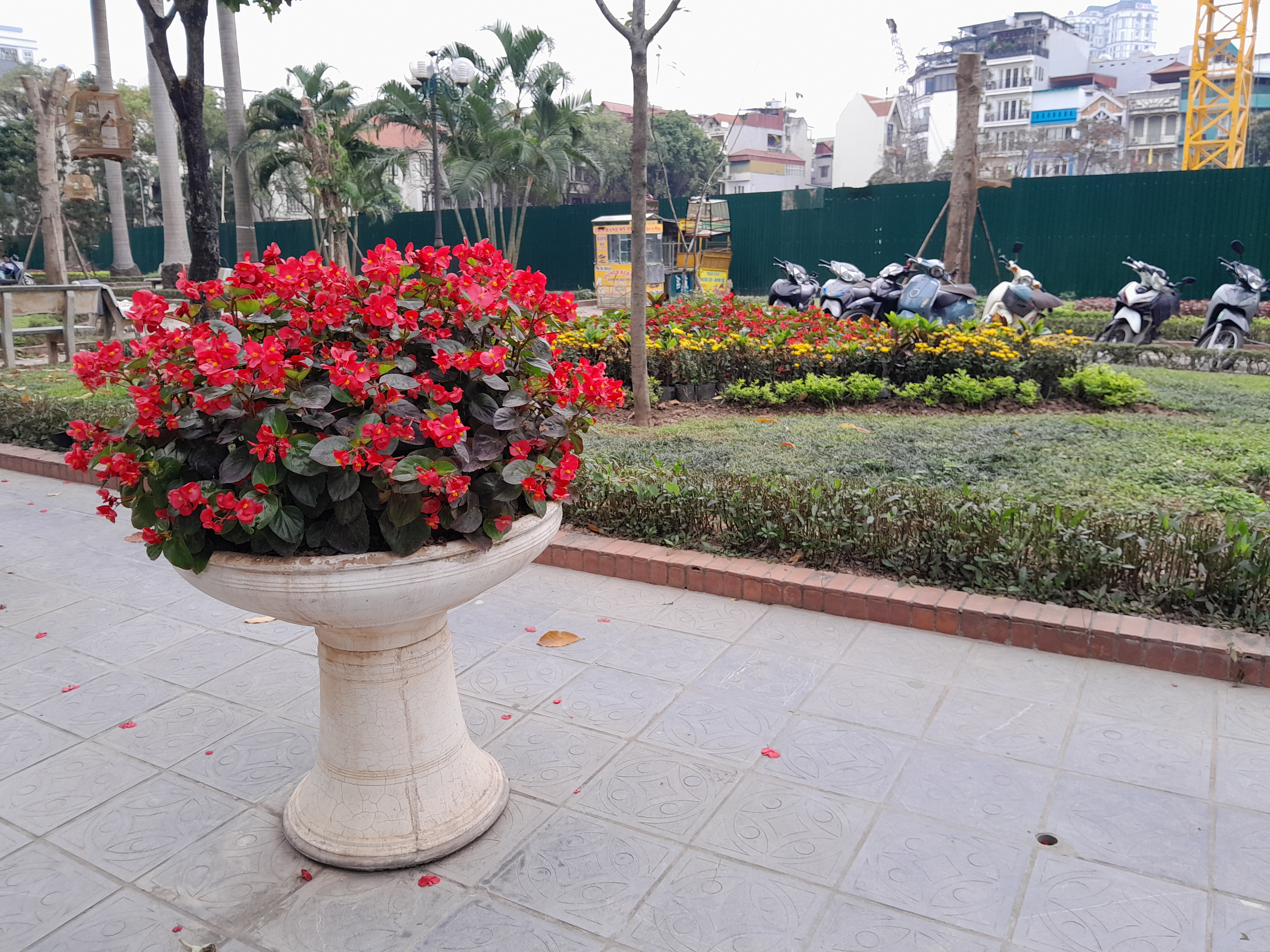
Híkaros Gardens

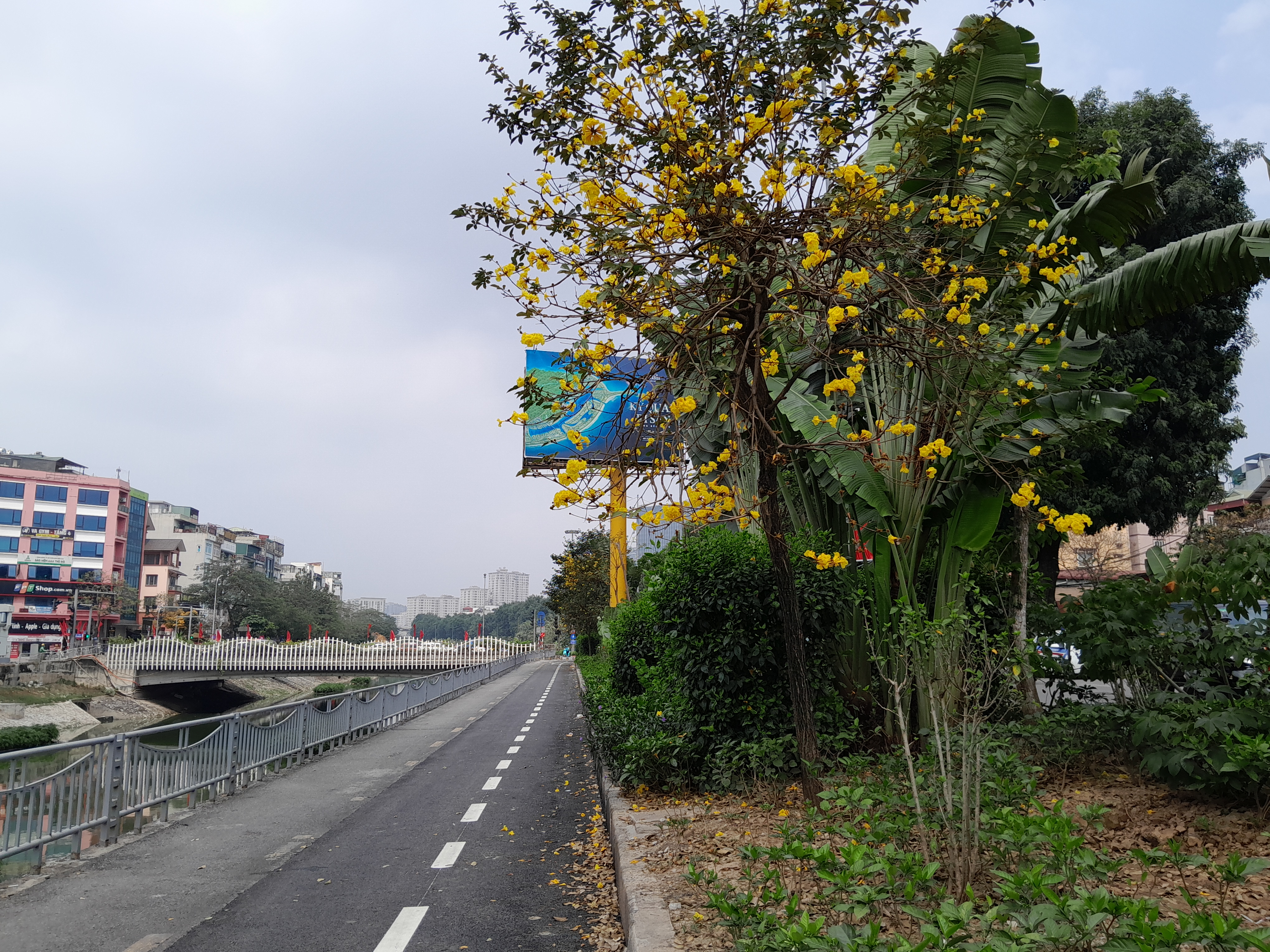
Tô Lịch Riverside Parks

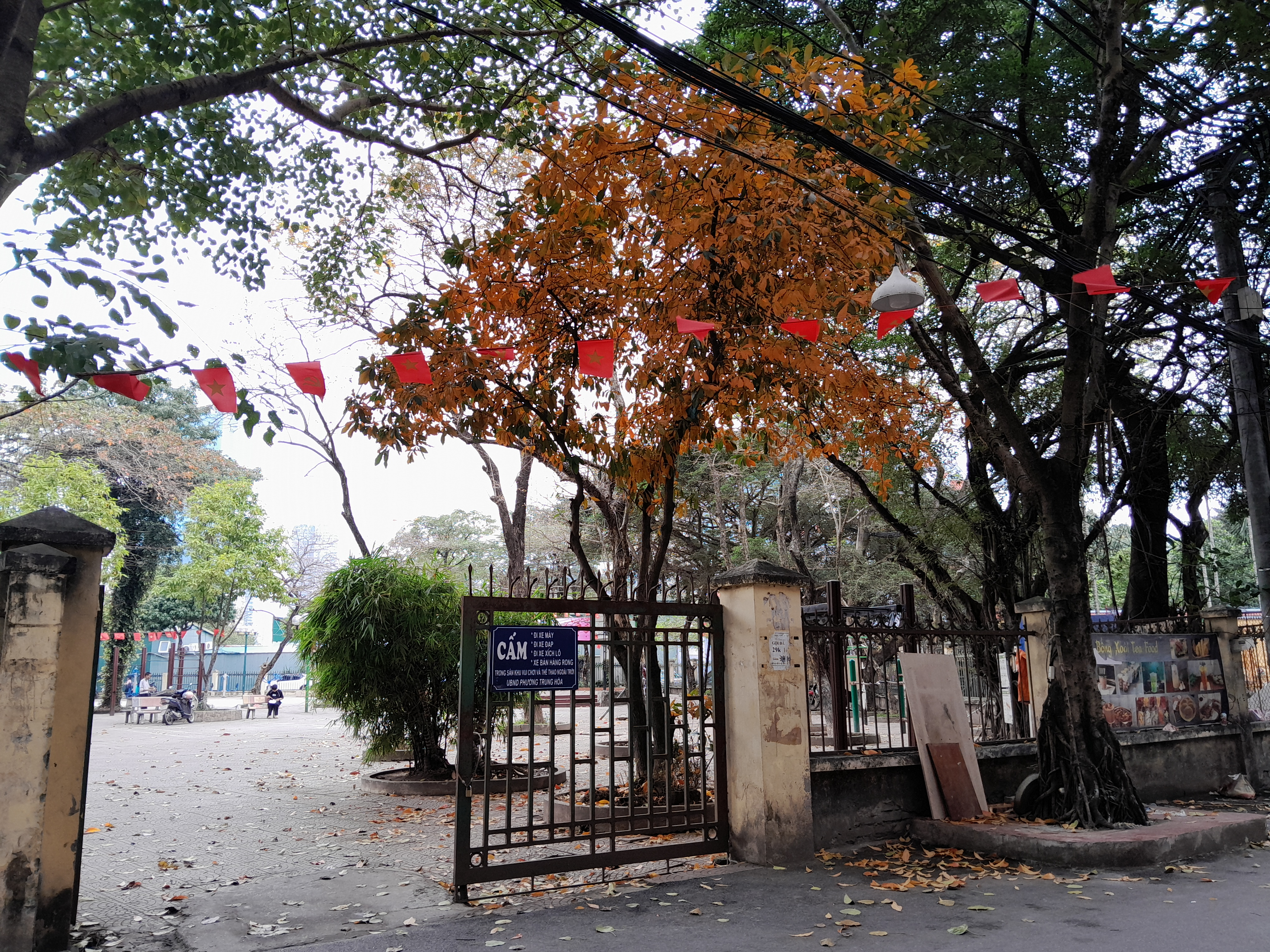
Trung Kính Hạ Playground

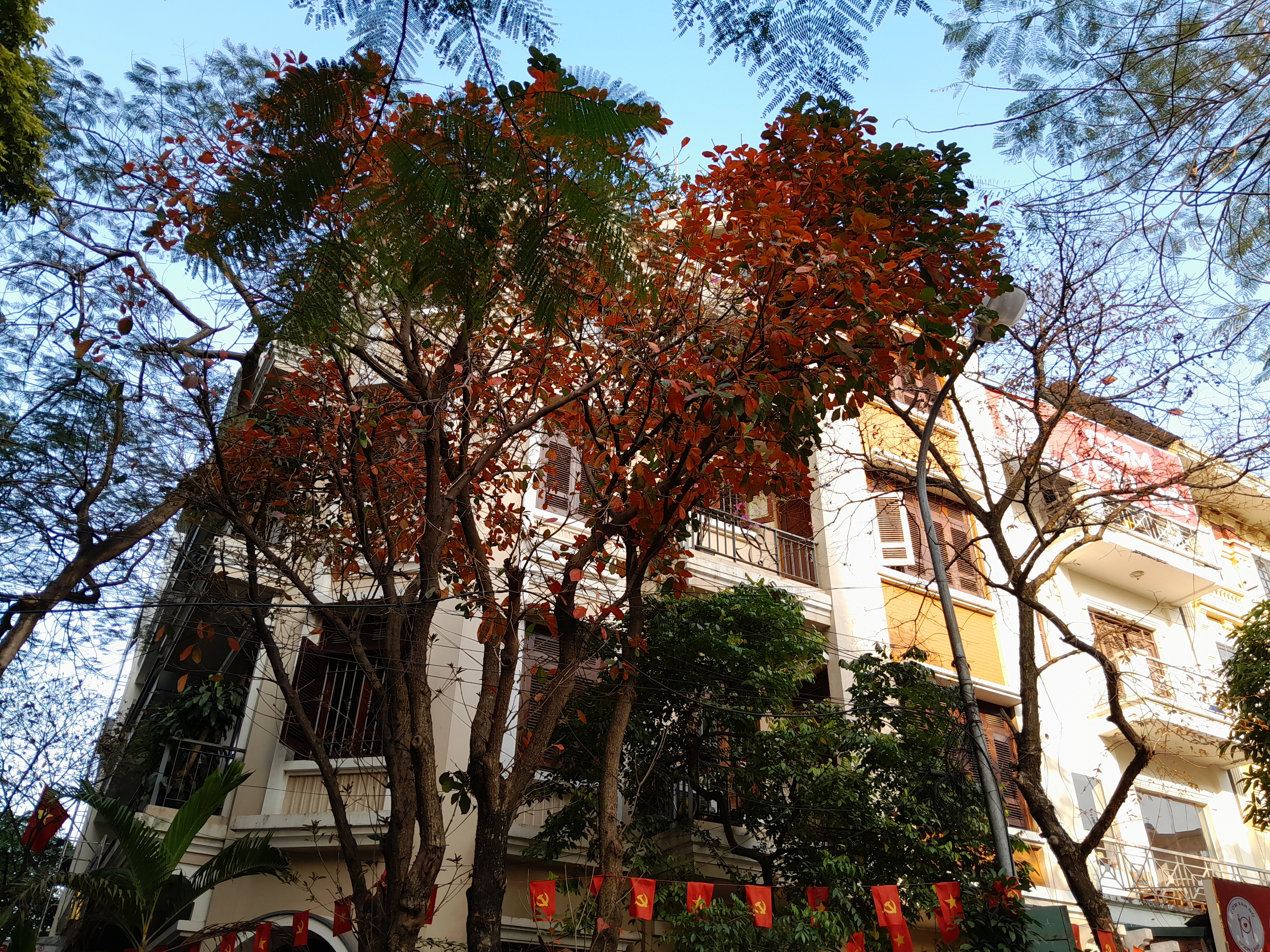
Học Phi Street

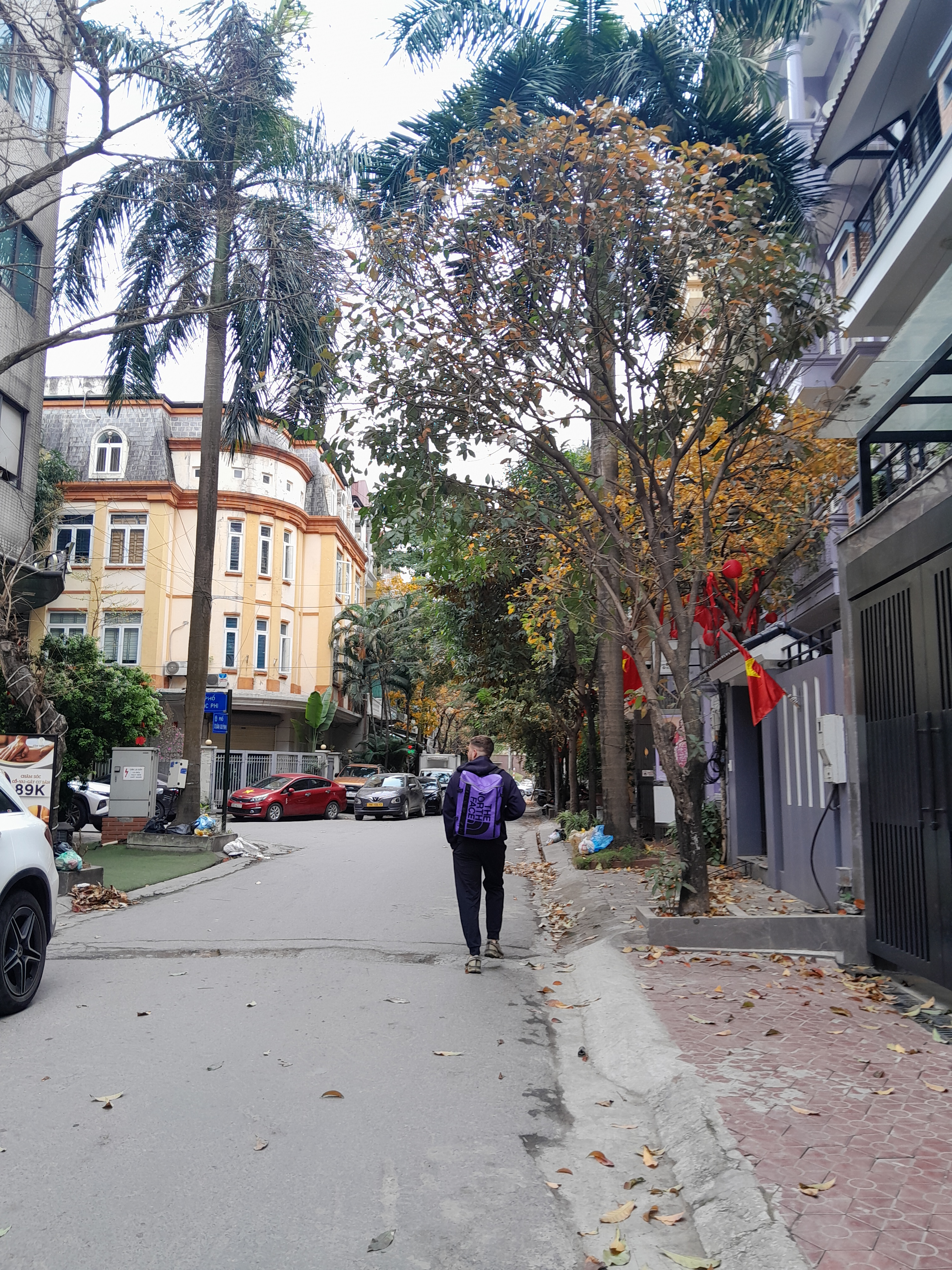
Xuân Quỳnh Street

=== Climate ===
Like Hanoi, under the Köppen climate classification Yên Hòa Ward has a humid subtropical climate (Cfa). There is significant air pollution in Yên Hòa like other wards of Hanoi. A 2022 study from the Vietnam National University determined that most of the air pollution in here is caused by particulates. Nitrogen oxides, carbon monoxide and sulfur dioxide in the air are also present in significant amount.

Climate data for Yên Hòa Ward
Month	Jan	Feb	Mar	Apr	May	Jun	Jul	Aug	Sep	Oct	Nov	Dec	Year
Record high °C (°F)	33.3 (91.9)	35.1 (95.2)	37.2 (99.0)	41.5 (106.7)	42.8 (109.0)	41.8 (107.2)	40.8 (105.4)	39.7 (103.5)	37.4 (99.3)	36.6 (97.9)	36.0 (96.8)	31.9 (89.4)	42.8 (109.0)
Mean daily maximum °C (°F)	19.8 (67.6)	20.6 (69.1)	23.2 (73.8)	27.7 (81.9)	31.9 (89.4)	33.4 (92.1)	33.4 (92.1)	32.6 (90.7)	31.5 (88.7)	29.2 (84.6)	25.7 (78.3)	22.0 (71.6)	27.6 (81.7)
Daily mean °C (°F)	16.6 (61.9)	17.7 (63.9)	20.3 (68.5)	24.2 (75.6)	27.6 (81.7)	29.3 (84.7)	29.4 (84.9)	28.7 (83.7)	27.7 (81.9)	25.3 (77.5)	21.9 (71.4)	18.3 (64.9)	23.9 (75.0)
Mean daily minimum °C (°F)	14.5 (58.1)	15.8 (60.4)	18.4 (65.1)	21.9 (71.4)	24.8 (76.6)	26.4 (79.5)	26.5 (79.7)	26.1 (79.0)	25.2 (77.4)	22.8 (73.0)	19.3 (66.7)	15.8 (60.4)	21.5 (70.7)
Record low °C (°F)	2.7 (36.9)	5.0 (41.0)	7.0 (44.6)	9.8 (49.6)	15.4 (59.7)	20.0 (68.0)	21.0 (69.8)	20.9 (69.6)	16.1 (61.0)	12.4 (54.3)	6.8 (44.2)	5.1 (41.2)	2.7 (36.9)
Average rainfall mm (inches)	22.5 (0.89)	24.6 (0.97)	47.0 (1.85)	91.8 (3.61)	185.4 (7.30)	253.3 (9.97)	280.1 (11.03)	309.4 (12.18)	228.3 (8.99)	140.7 (5.54)	66.7 (2.63)	20.2 (0.80)	1,670.1 (65.75)
Average rainy days	9.5	11.4	15.9	13.7	14.6	14.8	16.6	16.5	13.2	9.7	6.8	5.2	147.9
Average relative humidity (%)	79.9	82.5	84.5	84.7	81.1	80.0	80.7	82.7	81.0	78.5	77.1	76.2	80.7
Mean monthly sunshine hours	68.7	48.1	45.5	87.4	173.7	167.0	181.1	163.0	162.4	150.3	131.6	113.0	1,488.5
Source 1: Vietnam Institute for Building Science and Technology
Source 2: Extremes (Note: All-time record high; VietNamNet.vn (May record high and January record low only), VietNamNet.vn (June record high only), Imh.ac.vn (August record high only), Nchmf.gov.vn, January record high, November record high, April and May record low in The Yearbook of Indochina.)

== Administration ==
=== Public administration ===
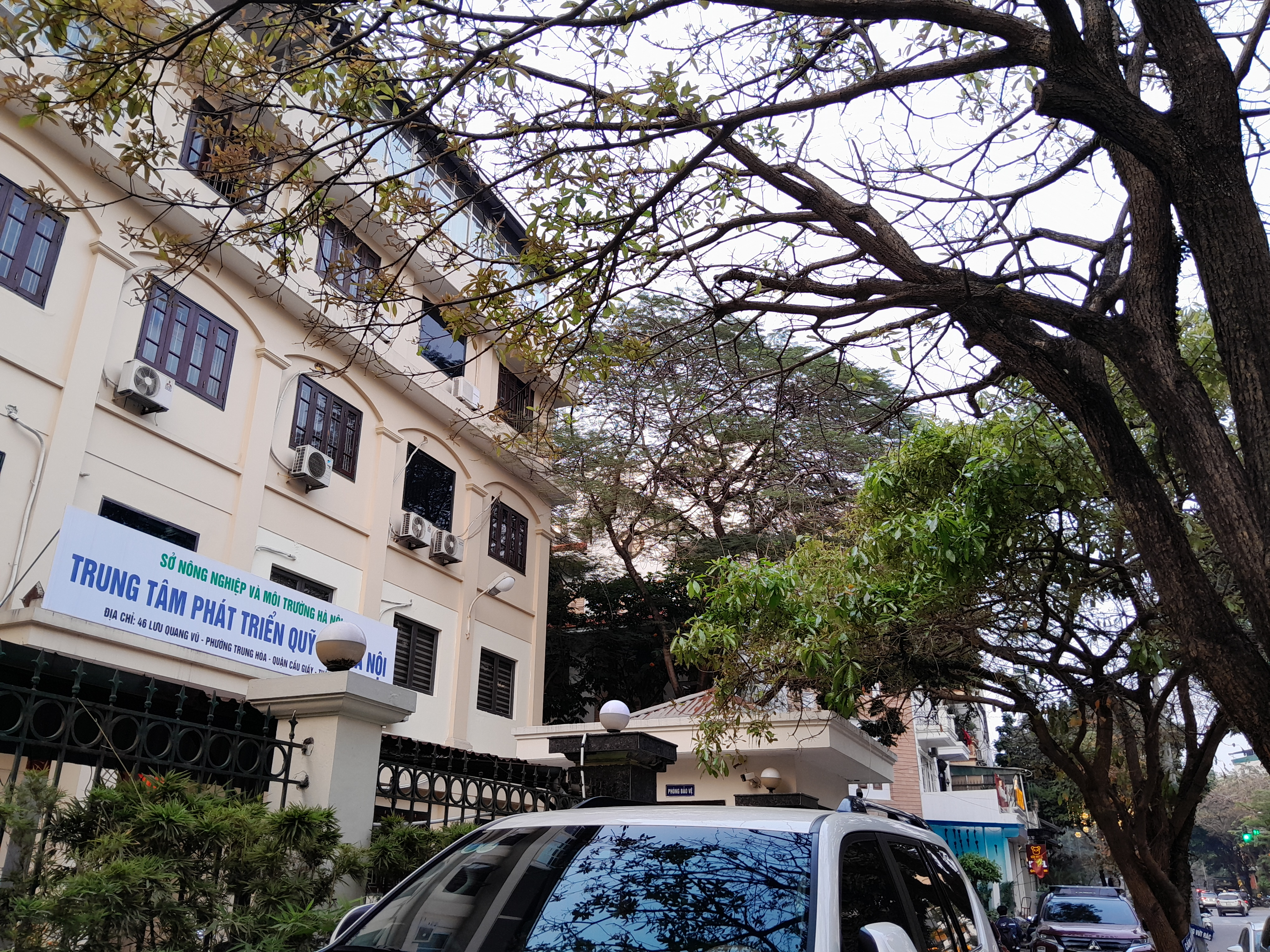
Headquarters of Hanoi Land Development Center.

Local level

- Yên Hòa Ward People's Committee: No.231, Nguyễn Ngọc Vũ Street, Yên Hòa Ward of the urban Hanoi.
- Yên Hòa Ward Communist Party Committee and Fatherland Front Committee: No.255, Nguyễn Khang Street, Yên Hòa Ward of the urban Hanoi.
- Yên Hòa Ward Public Administrative Service Center: No.231, Nguyễn Ngọc Vũ Street, Yên Hòa Ward of the urban Hanoi.
- Yên Hòa Ward Police Station: No.73, Đỗ Quang Street, Yên Hòa Ward of the urban Hanoi.

Central level

- Supreme People's Procuracy: No.9, Phạm Văn Bạch Street, Yên Hòa Ward of the urban Hanoi.
- Government Inspectorate: No.20, Hoàng Quán Chi Street, Yên Hòa Ward of the urban Hanoi.
- State Audit Office: No.116, phố Nguyễn Chánh Street, Yên Hòa Ward of the urban Hanoi.
- Telecommunications Department: No.68, Dương Đình Nghệ Street, Yên Hòa Ward of the urban Hanoi.
- Hanoi Land Development Center: No.46, Lưu Quang Vũ Street, Yên Hòa Ward of the urban Hanoi.
- Institute of Agricultural Mechanization and Post-Harvest Technology: No.60, Trung Kính Street, Yên Hòa Ward of the urban Hanoi.

=== Traffic routes ===
According to the roadmap to be implemented from July 1, 2025, in addition to the streets that existed before the reform and merger, six projects, essentially new urban areas Cầu Giấy, Dịch Vọng, Nam Trung Yên, Trung Hòa Nhân Chính, Trung Yên, and Yên Hòa, will begin to be divided into streets with completely new names. These new names are inspired by the names of famous writers and journalists, aiming to create a distinctive character for the administrative units they belong to.

Name	Function	Date of plaque unveiling	Length (km)	Describe					
Name	Function	Date of plaque unveiling	Length (km)	Describe	Đinh Núp	Street	December 4, 2019	1	Previously part of Nam Trung Yên resettlement area.
Đỗ Quang	Street	2010	0,3	Previously it was Alley 61 of Trần Duy Hưng Street.					
Dương Đình Nghệ	Street	?	0,71	Previously part of Cầu Giấy Urban District.					
Hạ Yên Quyết	Street	January 16, 2021	0,4	From former Yên Hòa Street and part of Trung Kính Street.					
Hoa Bằng	Street	July, 1999	0,55	Previously part of Yên Hòa urban area.					
Hoàng Đạo Thúy	Street	August 2005	1,1	From Trung Hòa Nhân Chính urban area.					
Hoàng Minh Giám	Street	August 2005	1,128	Previously part of Trung Hòa Nhân Chính urban area.					
Hoàng Ngân	Street	December 2006	1,25	Previously part of Trung Kính Thượng Village.					
Hoàng Quán Chi	Street	October 6, 2022	1,180	Previously part of Cầu Giấy urban area.					
Học Phi	Street	August 29, 2025	0,4	From Trung Yên 8 Road.					
Khuất Duy Tiến	Boulevard	2001	1,7	Previously part of Từ Liêm Urban District.					
Láng	Boulevard	1986	0,54	From Láng Road and Tô Lịch Riverside Road.					
Lê Văn Lương	Street	2000	3,5	From Cầu Giấy Urban District.					
Lưu Quang Vũ	Street	December 10, 2021	0,43	Previously it was Trung Yên 3 Road.					
Mạc Thái Tổ	Street	July 6, 2015	0,9	From Trung Kính Street.					
Mạc Thái Tông	Street	October 18, 2015	0,84	From Trung Kính Street.					
Nam Trung Yên	Street[s]	?	?	Consists of unnamed routes from Nam Trung Yên resettlement area.					
Nguyễn Bá Khoản	Street	March 12, 2022	0,47	Previously it was Trung Yên 9 Road.					
Nguyễn Chánh	Street	December 10, 2021	1	Previously part of Trung Kính Street.					
Nguyễn Khang	Street	?	2,1	From Cầu Giấy Urban District.					
Nguyễn Ngọc Vũ	Street	July, 2000	1	From Trung Kính Thượng Village.					
Nguyễn Như Uyên	Street	March 12, 2022	0,73	From Nam Trung Yên resettlement area.					
Nguyễn Quốc Trị	Street	January 26, 2019	0,12	From Nam Trung Yên resettlement area.					
Nguyễn Thị Duệ	Street	January 16, 2021	0,791	Previously it was Alley 219 of Trung Kính Street.					
Nguyễn Thị Định	Street	December, 2006	0,1	Previously part of Trần Duy Hưng Street.					
Nguyễn Thị Thập	Street	December, 2006	0,8	From Trần Duy Hưng Street.					
Nguyễn Vĩnh Bảo	Street	October 6, 2022	0,57	Previously part of Trung Yên urban area.					
Nguyễn Xuân Linh	Street	January 11, 2020	0,5	From Trung Hòa Nhân Chính urban area.					
Nguyễn Xuân Nham	Street	January 19, 2024	0,65	From Nam Trung Yên resettlement area.					
Nhân Hòa	Street	January, 1999	0,45	From two villages Quan Nhân and Hòa Mục.					
Phạm Hùng	Street	January, 2002	4,1	Previously part of Dịch Vọng urban area.					
Phạm Văn Bạch	Street	August 11, 2015	0,5	From Cầu Giấy urban area.					
Thâm Tâm	Street	January 19, 2024	0,595	Previously it was Trung Yên 6 Road.					
Thượng Yên Quyết	Street	January 27, 2026	0,215	Previously it was Alley 381 of Nguyễn Khang Street.					
Trần Duy Hưng	Street	1999	2,5	From Trung Kính Thượng Village.					
Trần Kim Xuyến	Street	March 5, 2014	0,55	From Yên Hòa urban area.					
Trần Thái Tông	Street	2008	0,5	Previously part of Nguyễn Phong Sắc Street.					
Trung Hòa	Street	?	1,2	From small parts of former streets Trung Yên and Yên Hòa.					
Trung Kính	Street	?	1,9	Previously part of Trung Kính Hạ Village.					
Trung Yên	Street[s]	?	?	Consists of unnamed routes from Trung Yên urban area.					
Tú Mỡ	Street	January 26, 2019	0,9	Previously it was the dike road of Trung Kính Street.					
Vũ Phạm Hàm	Street	July 14, 2010	1,5	Formerly known as Trung Yên 1 Road from Cầu Giấy Urban District.					
Xuân Quỳnh	Street	December 10, 2021	0,47	Previously it was Trung Yên 11 Road.					

== Culture ==
Yên Hòa Ward has long been dubbed one of the three core areas of tradition in capital city Hà Nội. This area still retains many historical sites, and is also known as the birthplace of many notable persons and developed professions.

=== Architecture ===
Relics

According to old maps, during the period from 1873 to 1882, when conflict between French and Annamese forces was intense, the area that is now Yên Hòa Ward was originally the boundary between two provinces Hà Nội and Hà Đông. Its location in the southwest of the Hà Nội Citadel, where the Tô Lịch River and a dense swampy area are situated, has inadvertently helped it preserve a system of old relics.

Following the official establishment of the ward-level administrative unit in 2025, the authority has compiled some statistics on the system of historical sites, which have existed since at least the 1980s and are associated with the period preceding the new ward. However, due to their sheer number, only three structures are considered representative based on their importance in local beliefs and the number of festivals associated with them in a year. In a more specific way : Trung Kính Thượng and Trung Kính Hạ Temples, where only one deity is worshipped, who received official respect from the Nguyễn Dynasty ; Dục Anh Temple, where are associated with the Mother Goddess religion, were recognized by the Nguyễn Dynasty in 1889 and 1924, respectively, and were classified as "historical and architectural relics" by the Ministry of Culture and Information in 1992.

Besides religious significance, Yên Hòa Ward has also been fertile ground for the development of knowledge and literature since the Lê Dynasty. This is evident not only in the number of scholars whose names are inscribed on stone steles at the Temple of Literature, but also in the names of many prominent figures who lived and died under all modern Vietnamese regimes. Some of these structures are still preserved intact today, including:

- House numbers from 1236 to 1248 at Láng Boulevard, with the semi-official name the Memorial Area of Poet Tú Mỡ. (Note: Khu lưu niệm Thi Sĩ Tú Mỡ.) A fully furnished house on a 1000m² plot of land, built in 1935 according to the design of architect Nguyễn Cao Luyện. The house adheres to the "house of light" (Note: Nhà ánh sáng.) style of the Self-Reliant Literary Group, with all the bricks ordered from Bát Tràng village. This was one of the familiar addresses for scholars and artists in North Vietnam from its inauguration until Tú Mỡ's death. In 2015, when the Hanoi City People's Committee simultaneously implemented two projects – the "Expansion of Cầu Giấy Intersection" and the "Elevated Railway Line" – the expansion of Láng Boulevard resulted in a loss of one-third of the land area. This drew public condemnation because the memorial site became dilapidated. After most of the house's structure was demolished, what remained was renovated to become Café 1238. This address continues to be a meeting place for Hanoian writers.
- Trung Kính Hạ Cultural House, where was constructed right at the beginning of the State of Vietnam regime, serving as the headquarters of the local police force. Over the years, its architecture has remained virtually unchanged. At times it served as a community cultural center, and at other times it was used for two functions: A fitness and gym center during the day, and the office of the civil defense force at night. The grounds of this historical site have long been used to preserve several very old stone steles from Trung Kính Hạ Village.
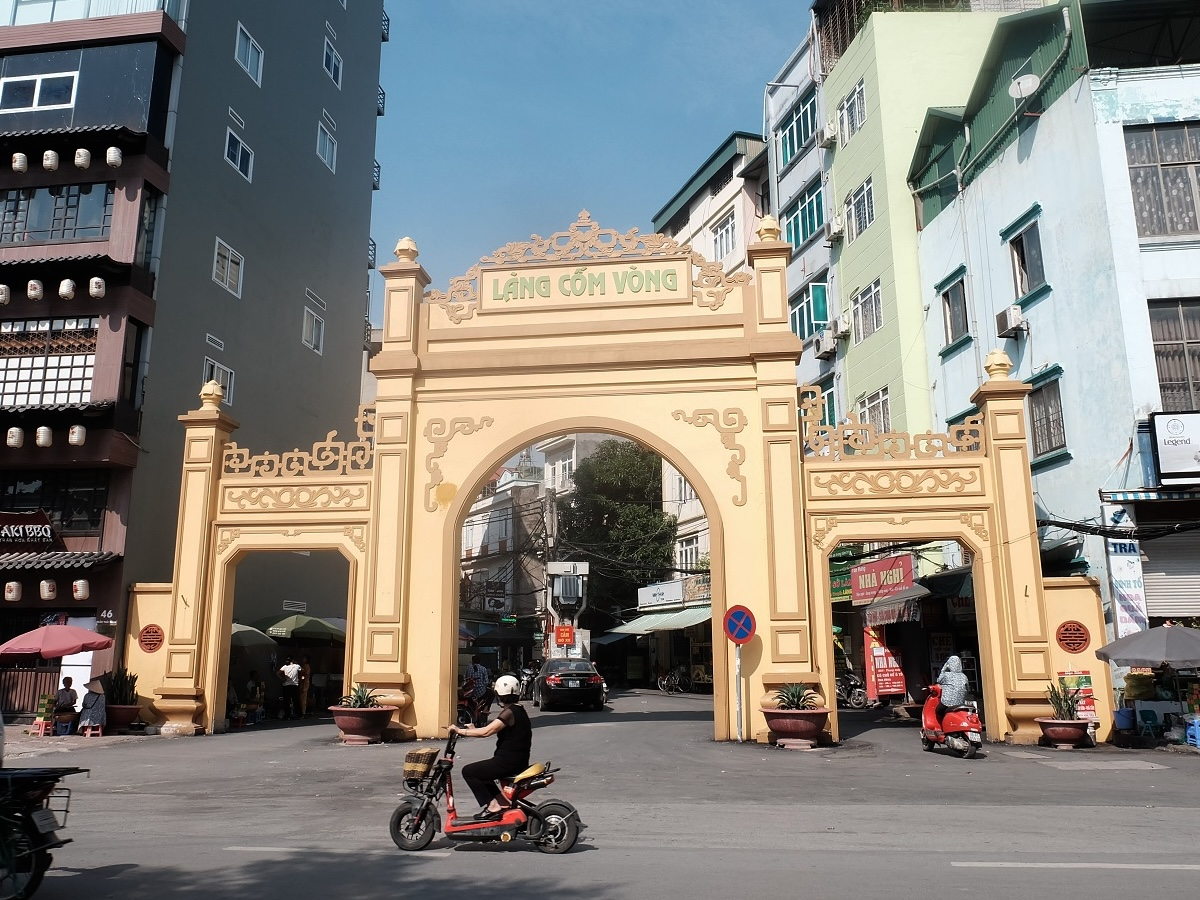
Gate of Dịch Vọng Hậu Village

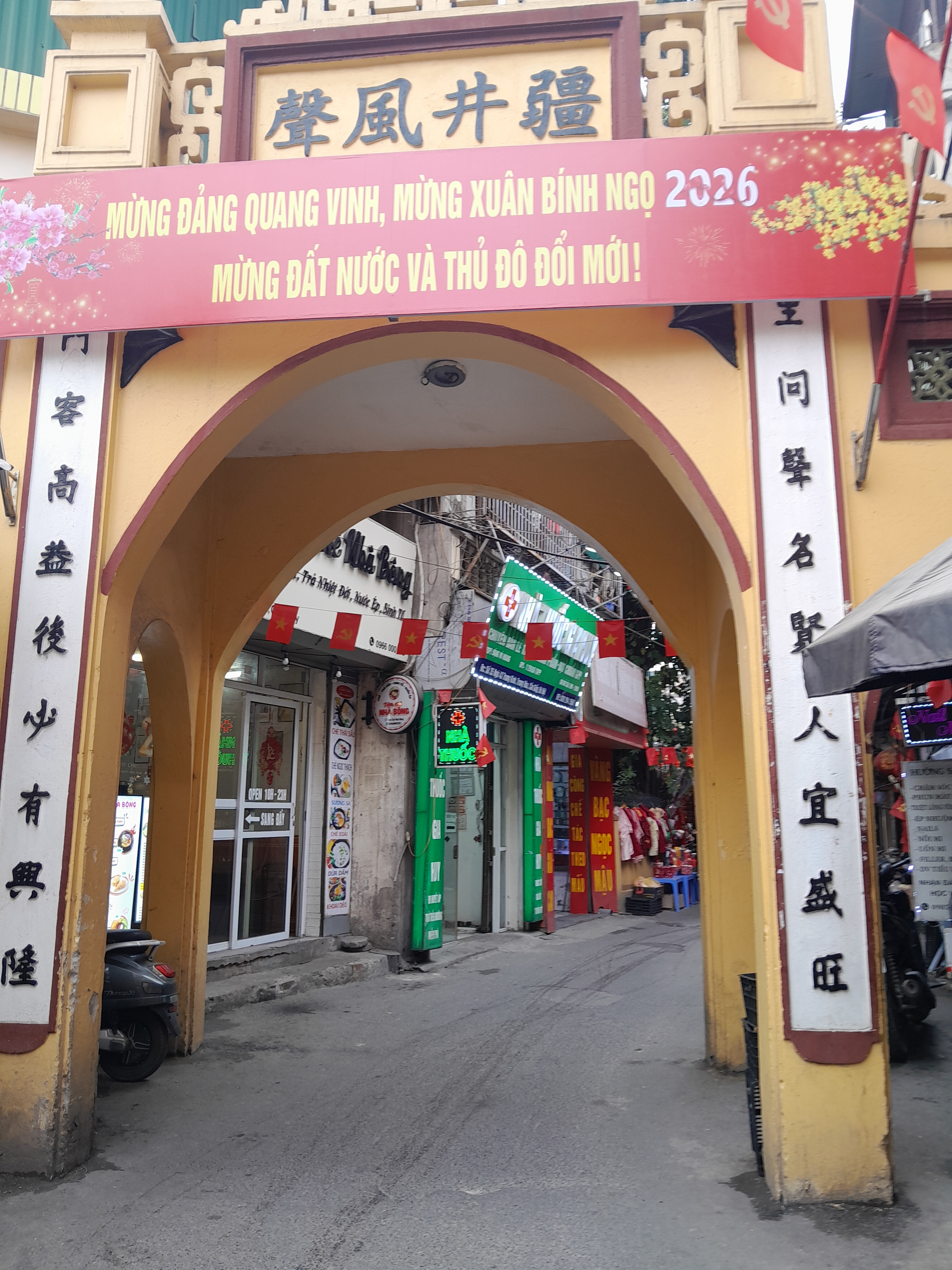
Gate of Trung Kính Hạ Village

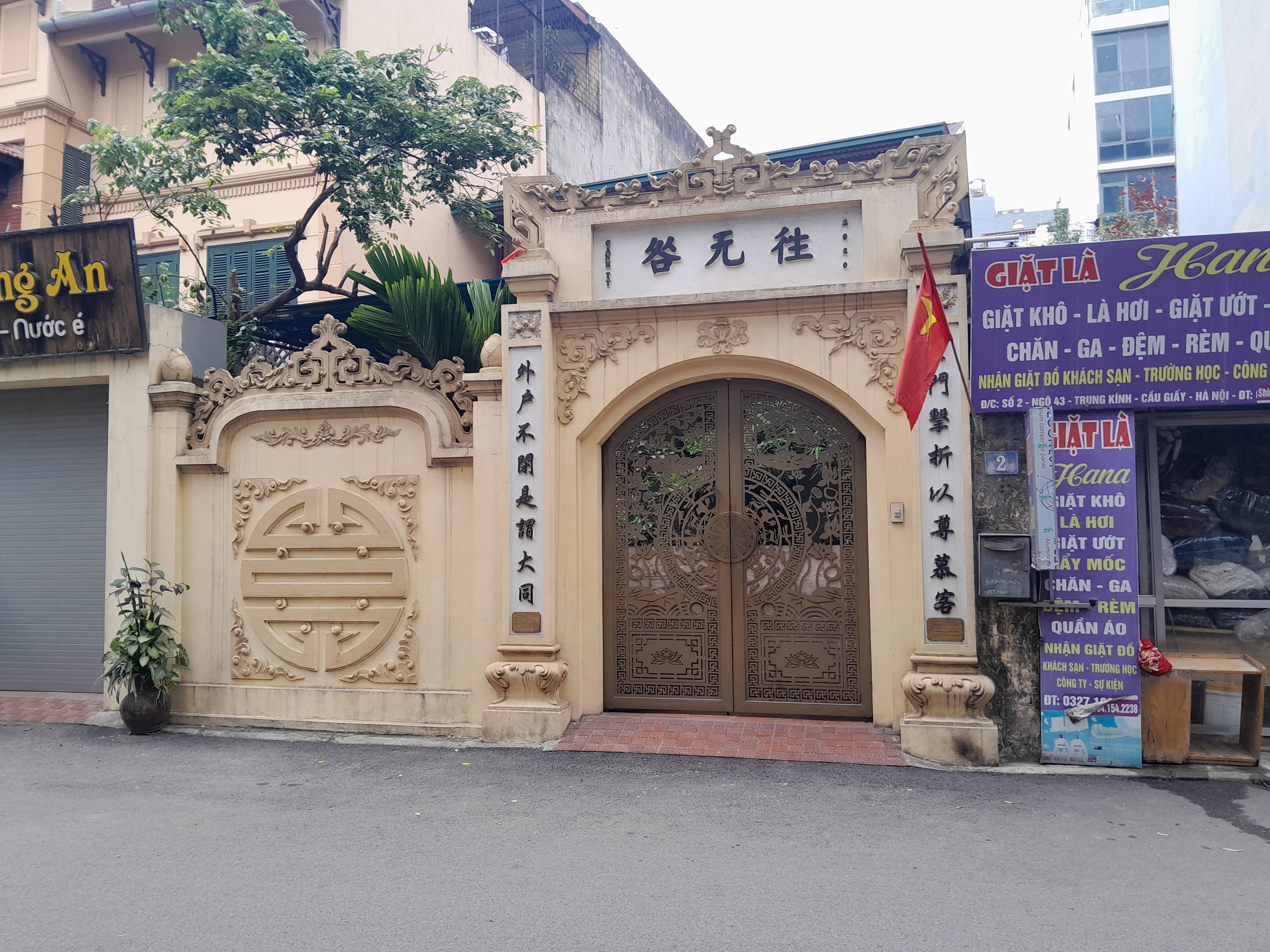
Old gate at Trung Kính Hạ Village

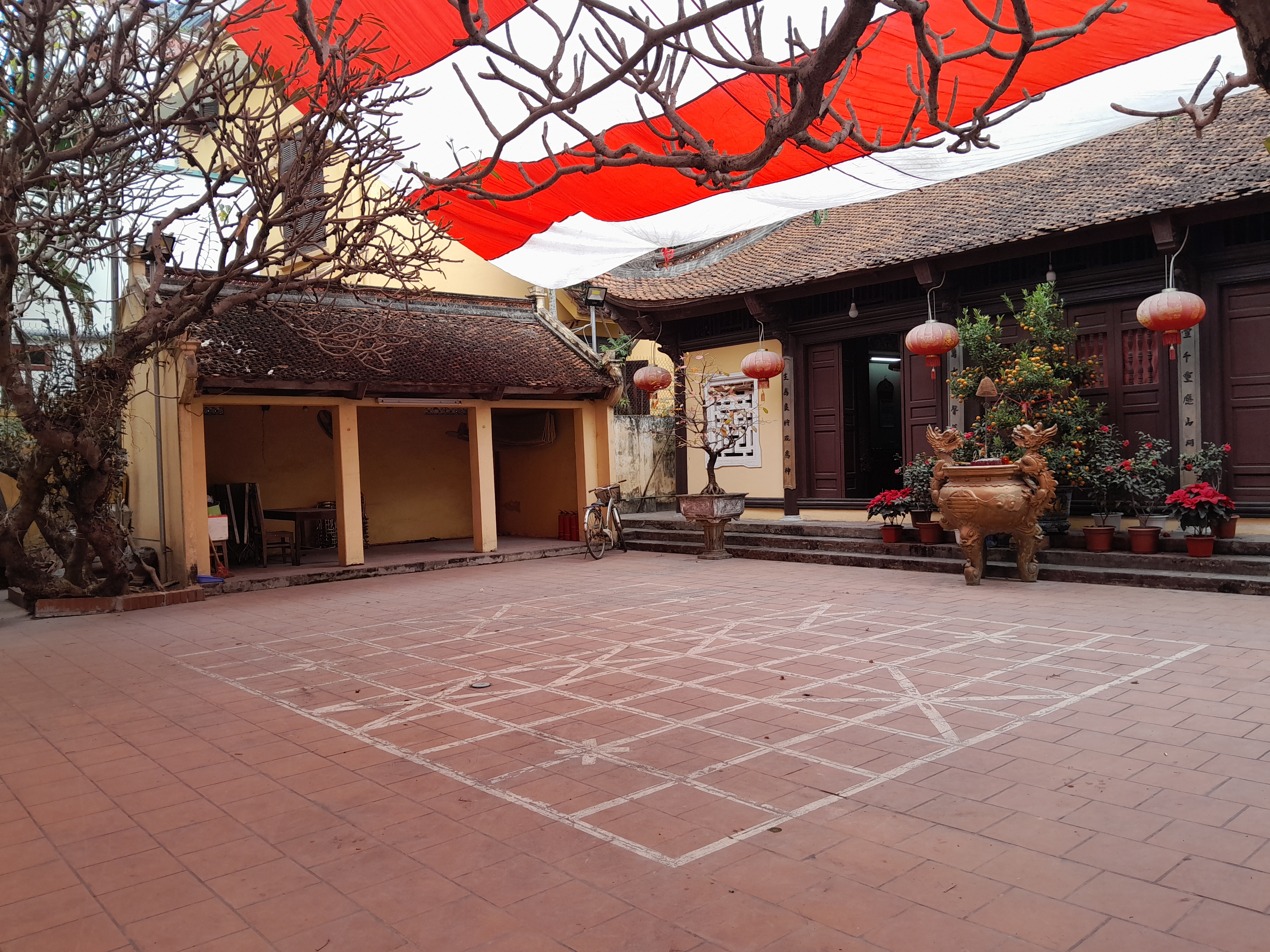
Trung Kính Hạ Hall

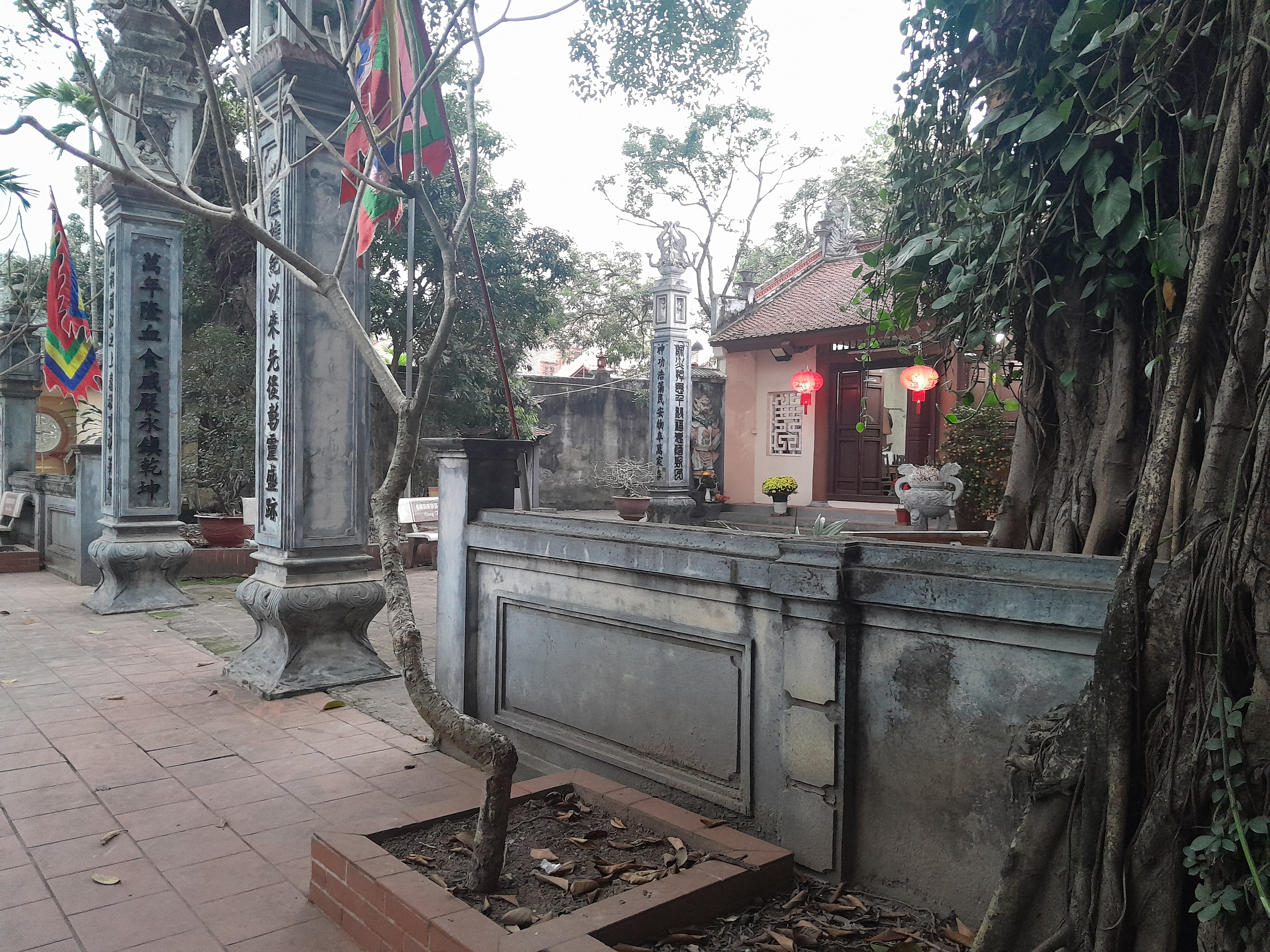
Trung Kính Hạ Patron Temple

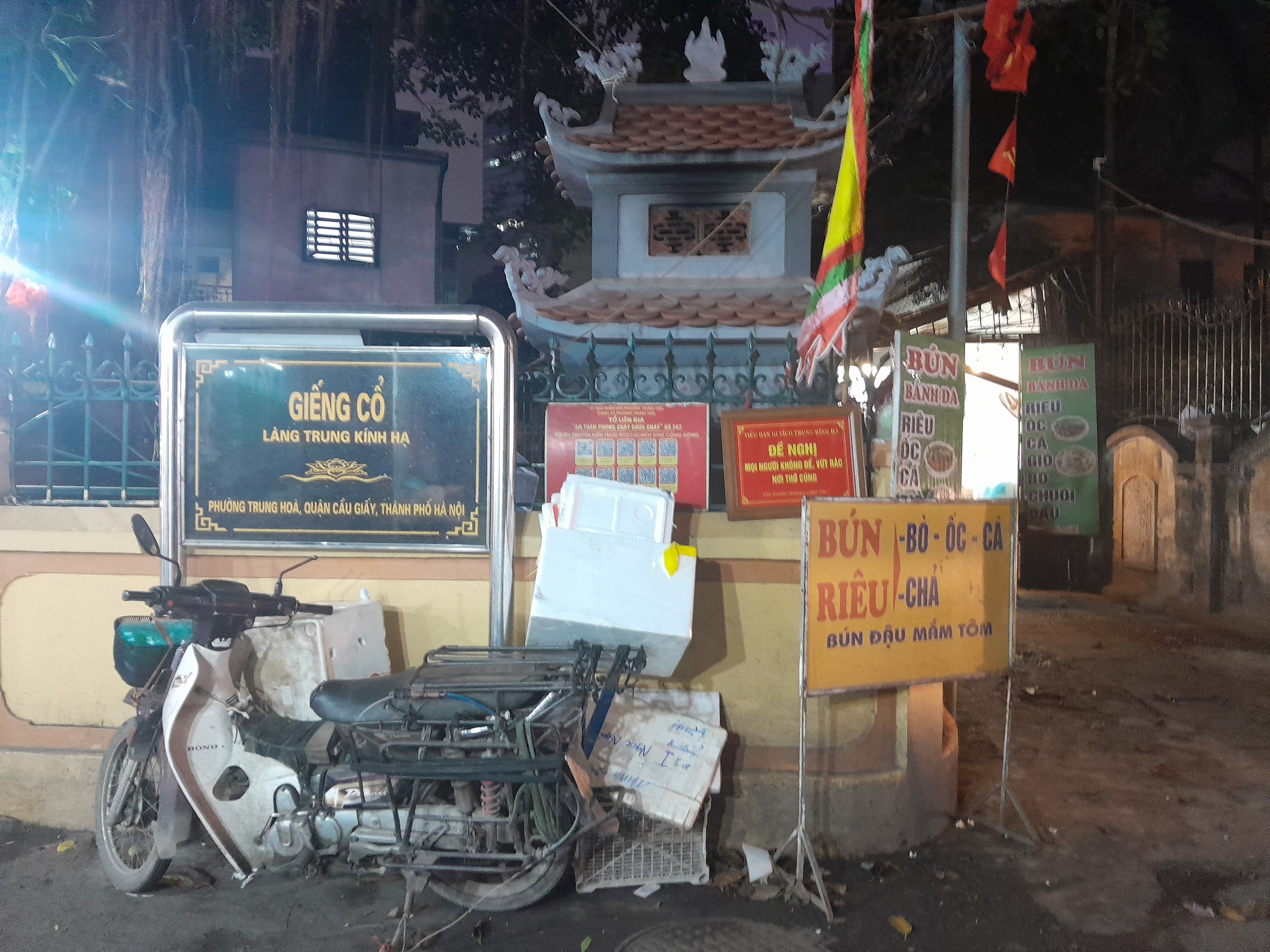
Old well of Trung Kính Hạ Village

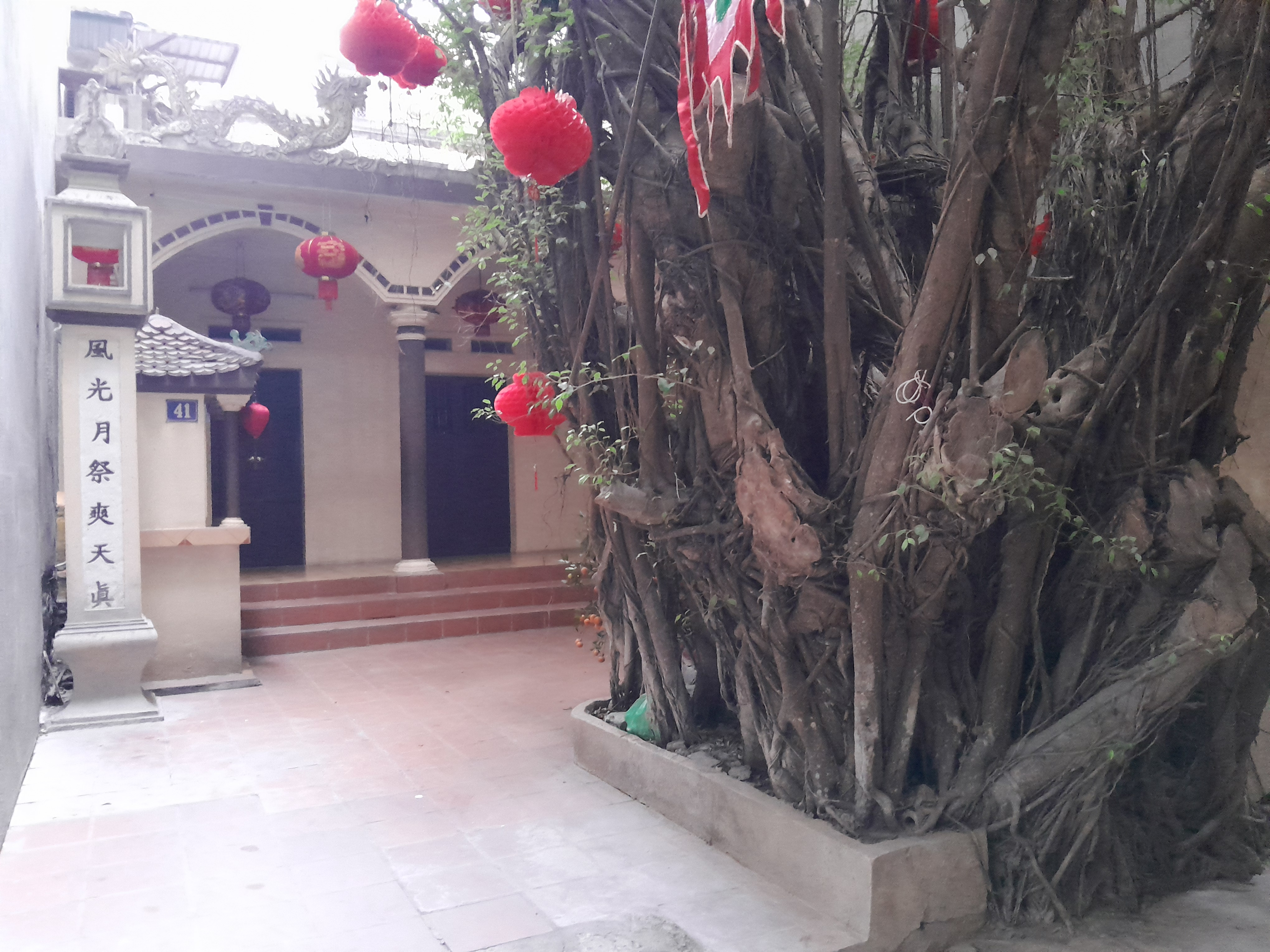
Mother Goddess Shrine

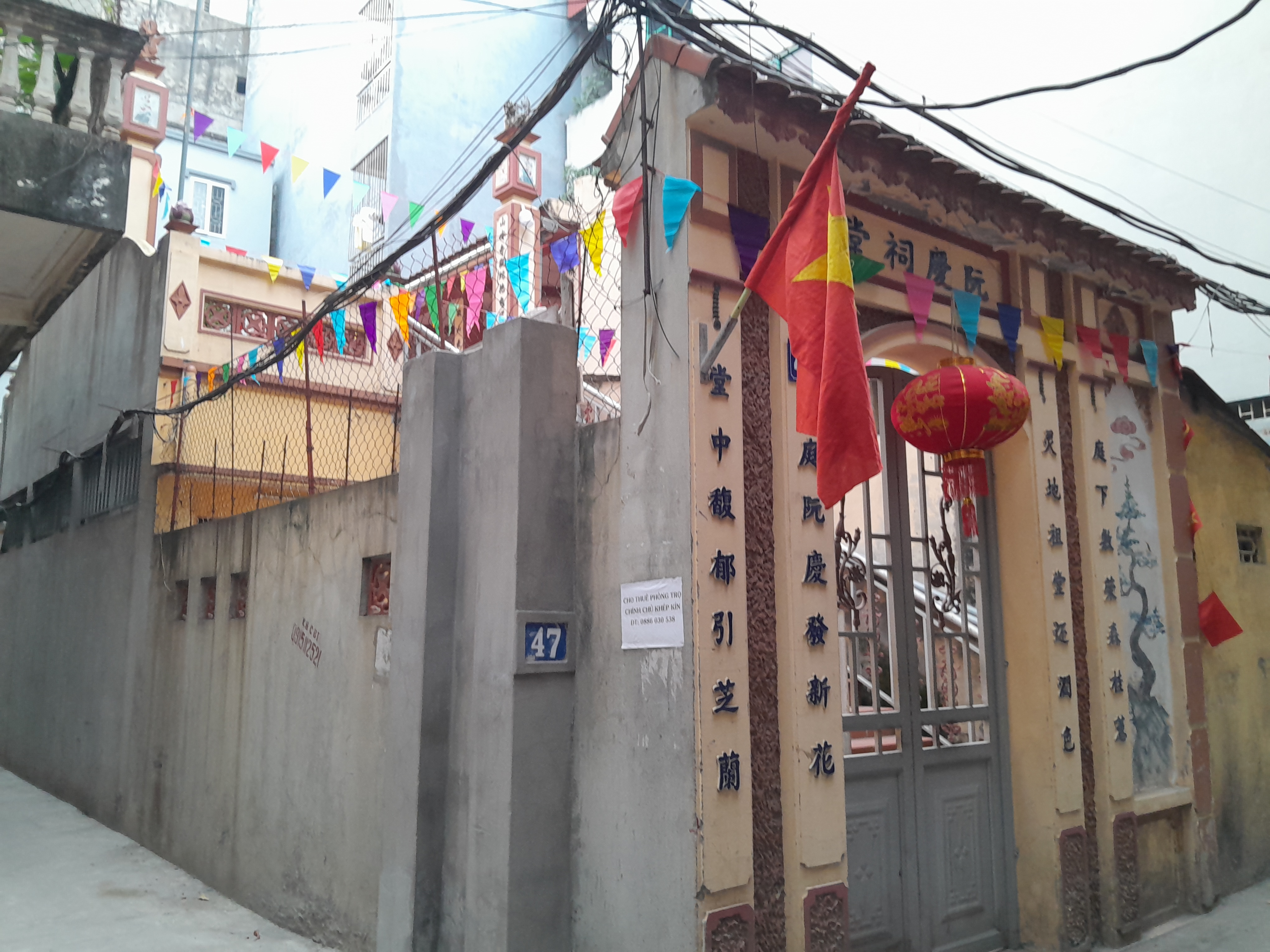
Trần Khánh family shrine

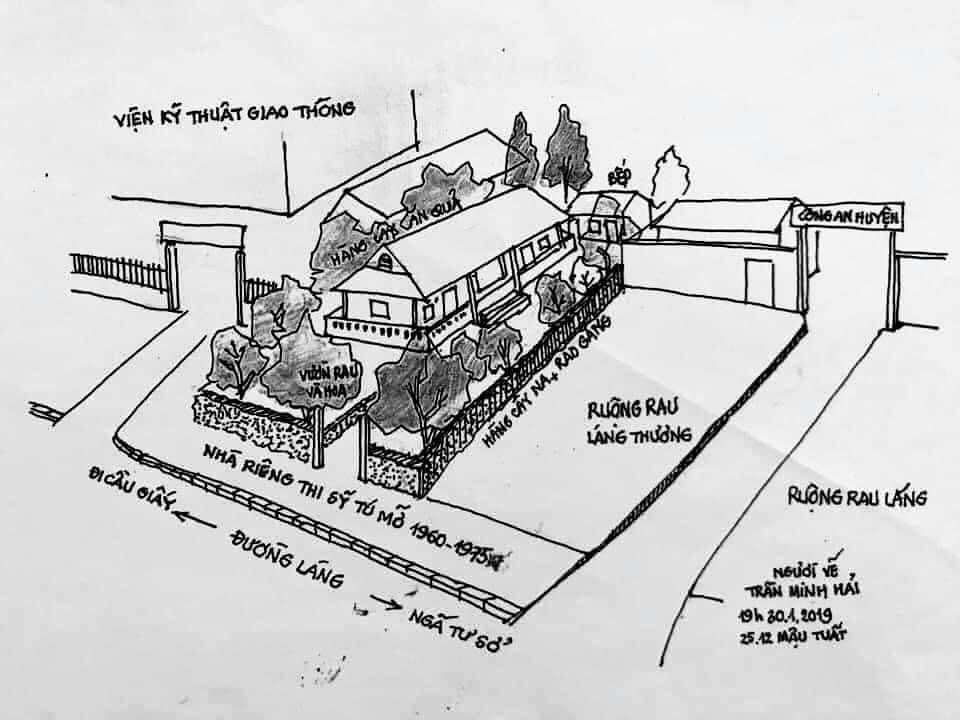
Poet Tú Mỡ's Memorial Area before demolition

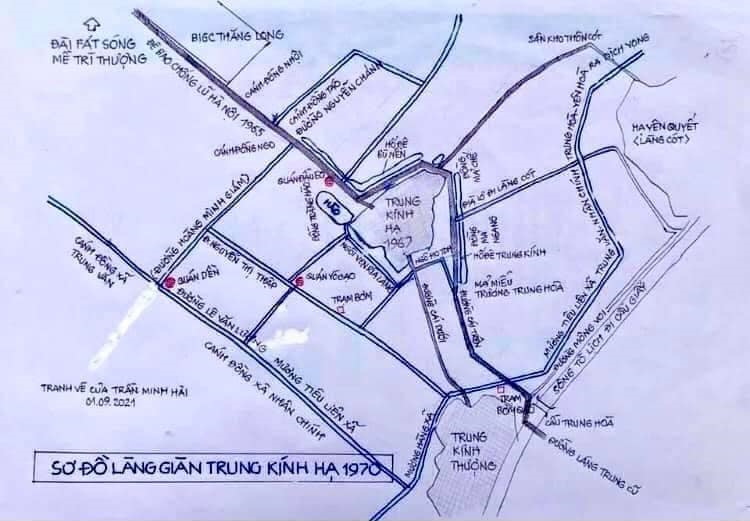
Diagram of Trung Kính Hạ Village 1970

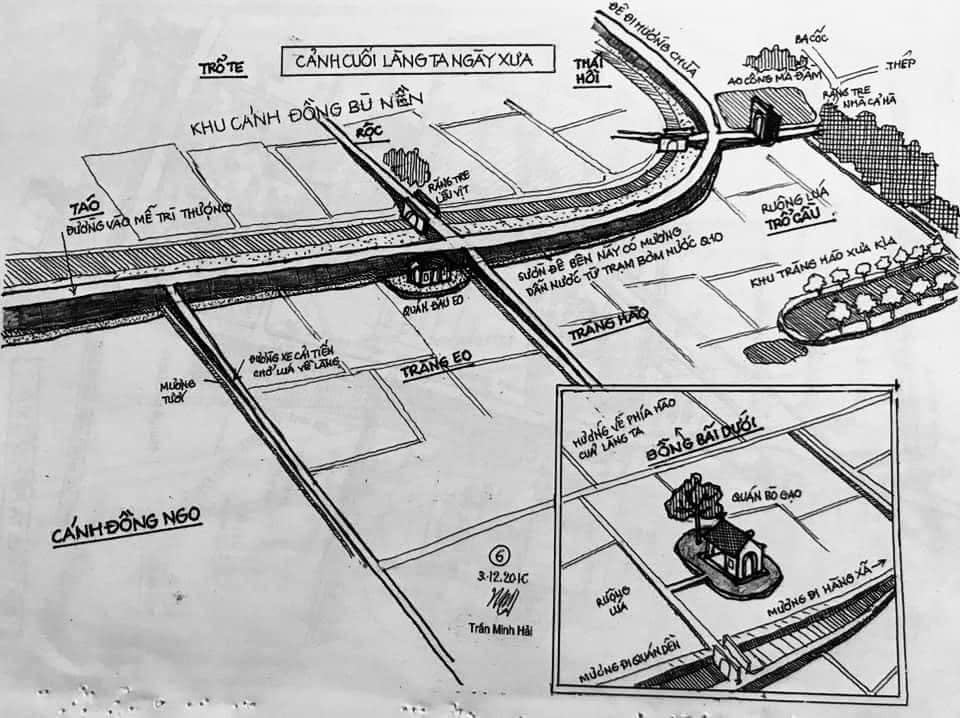
Diagram of Trung Kính Hạ Village 1970

Modern sites

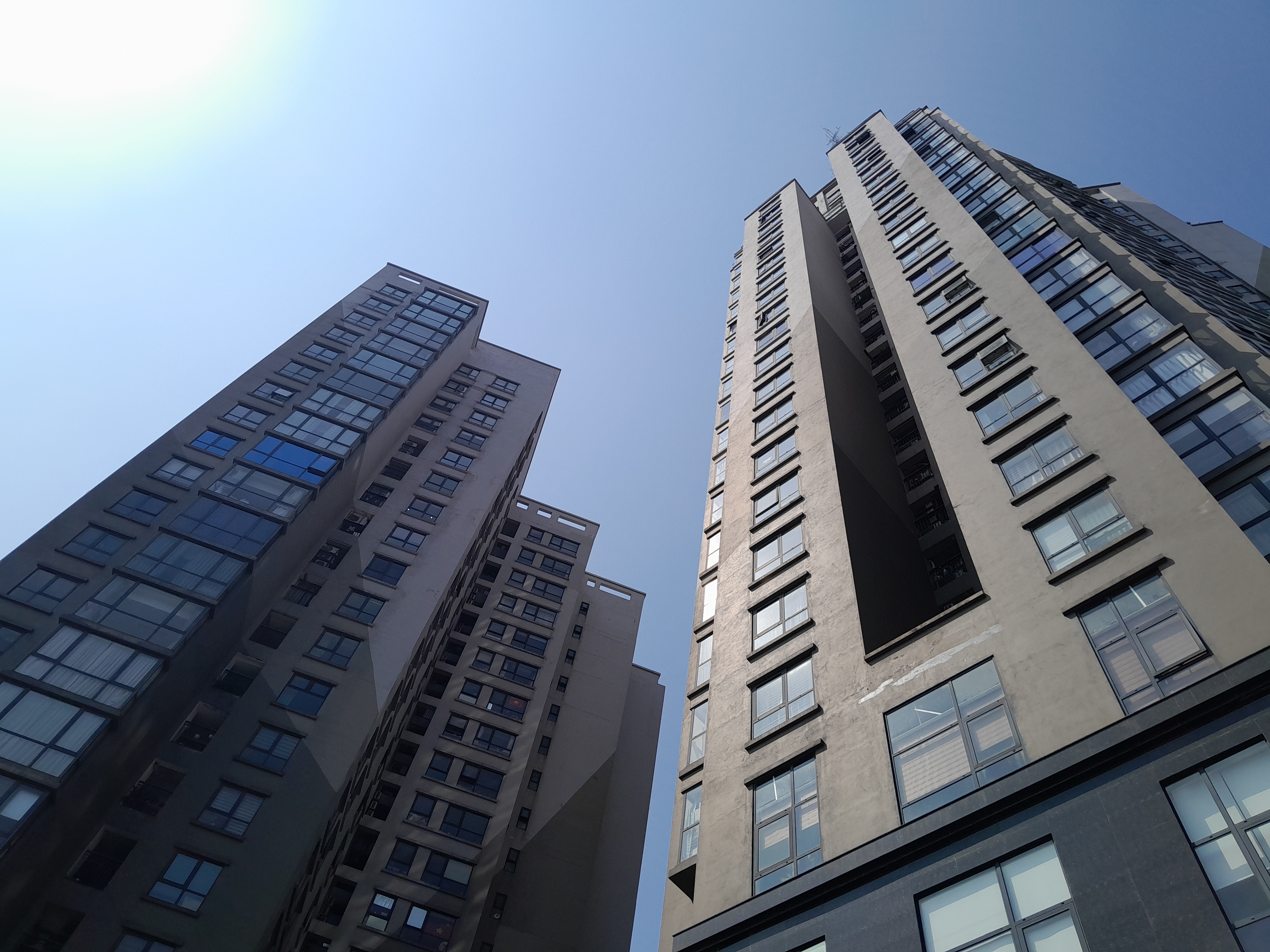
Yên Hòa Parkview City

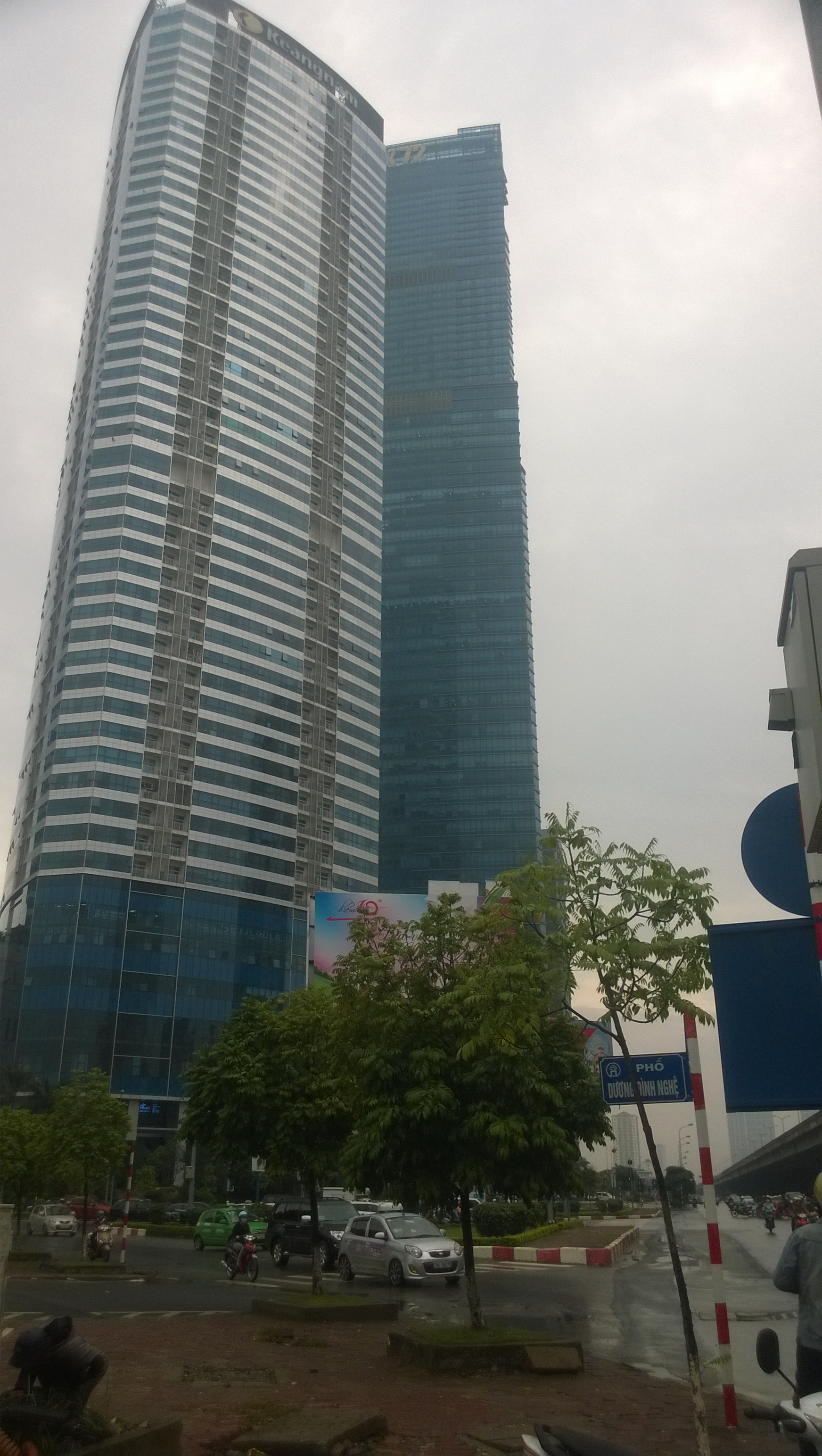
Keangnam Hanoi Landmark 72

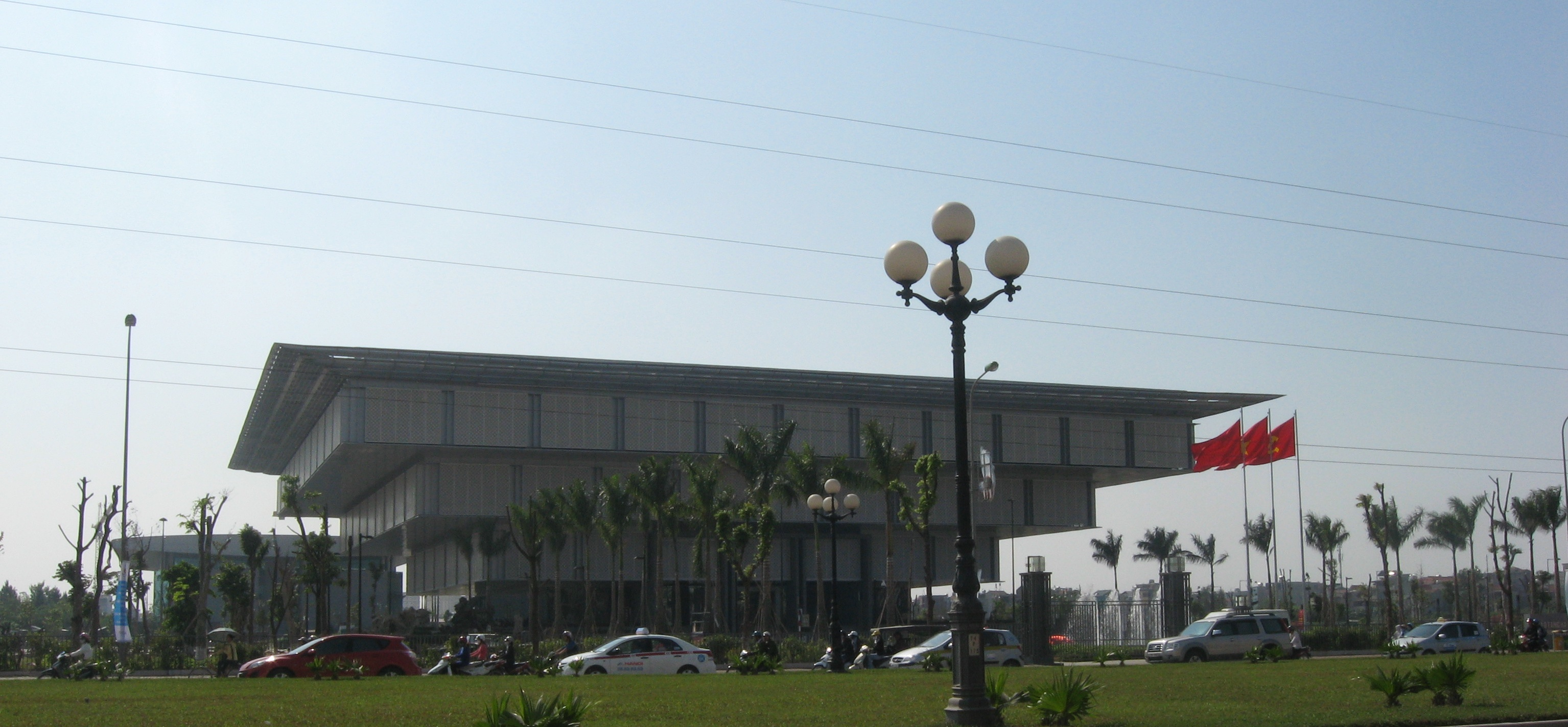
Hanoi Museum

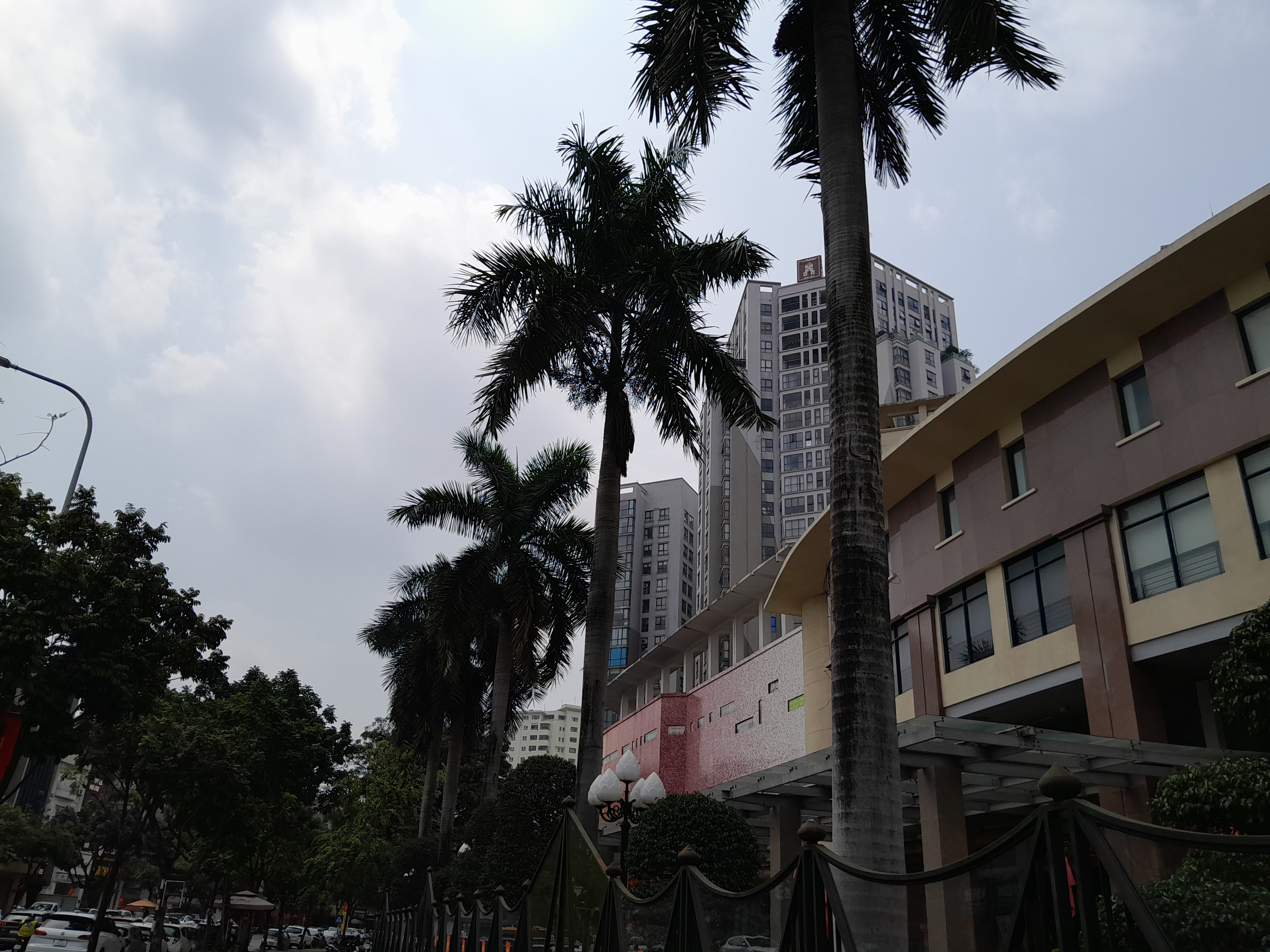
National Archives Centre I

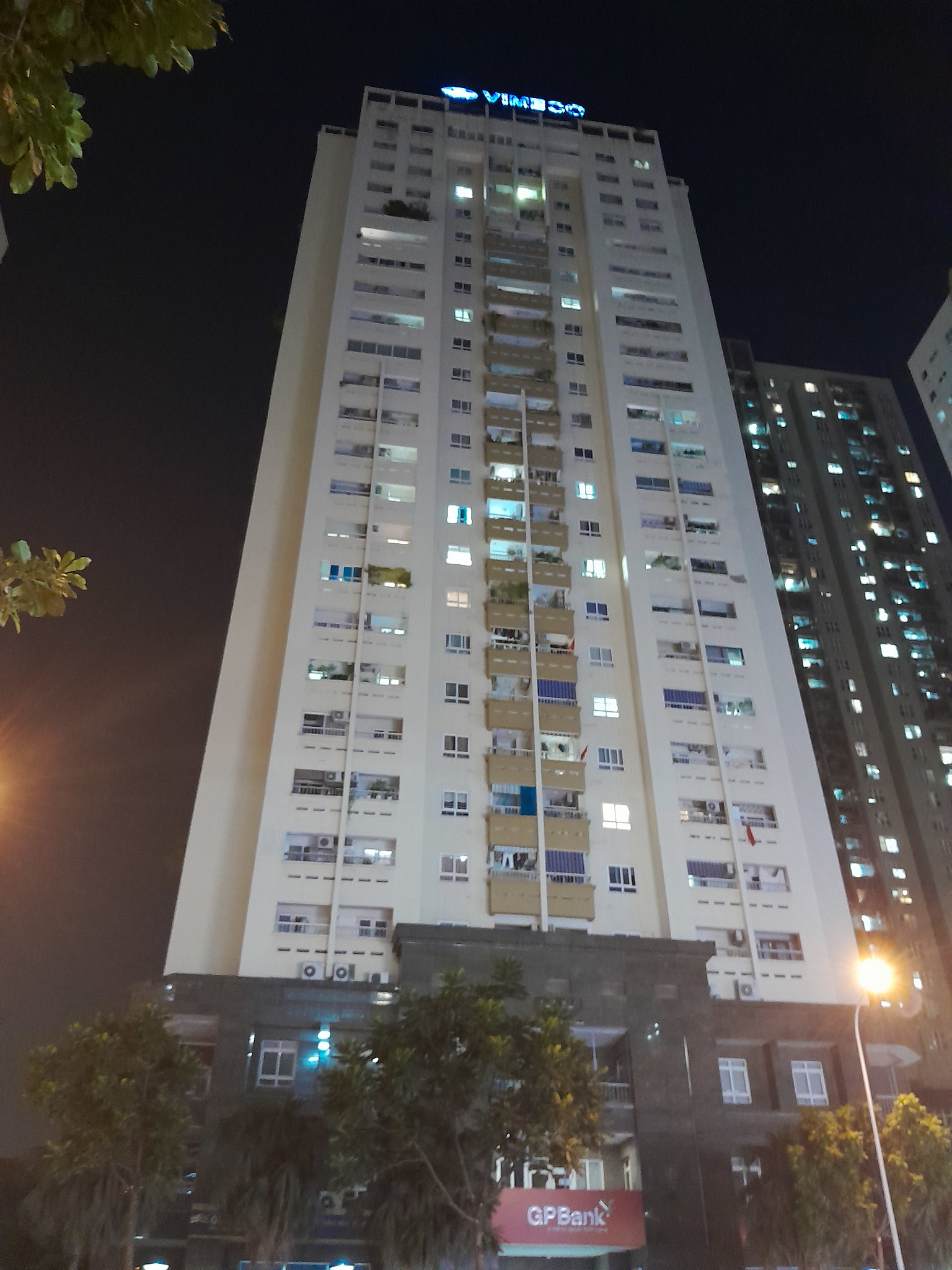
Vimeco II Apartments

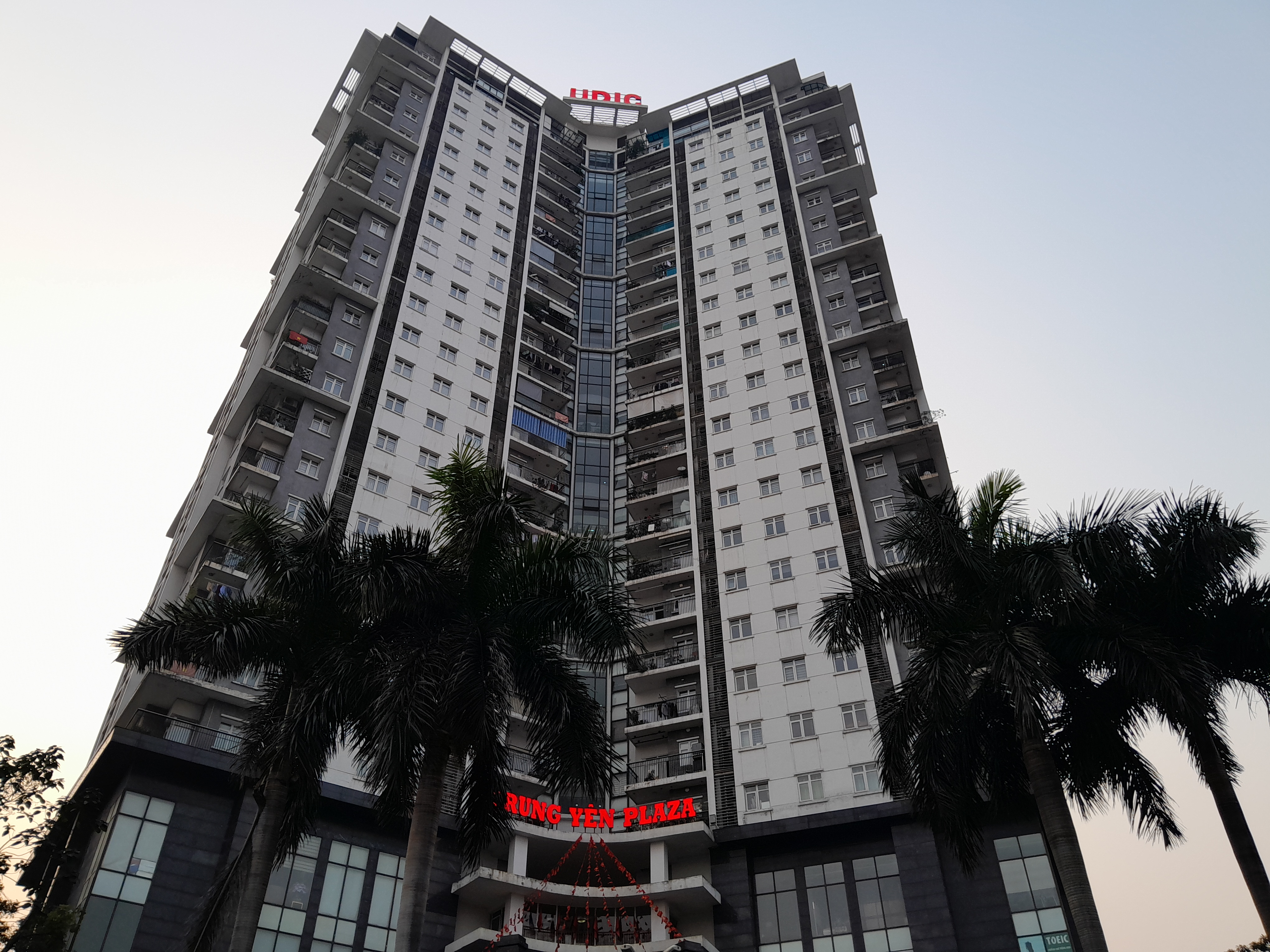
Trung Yên Plaza

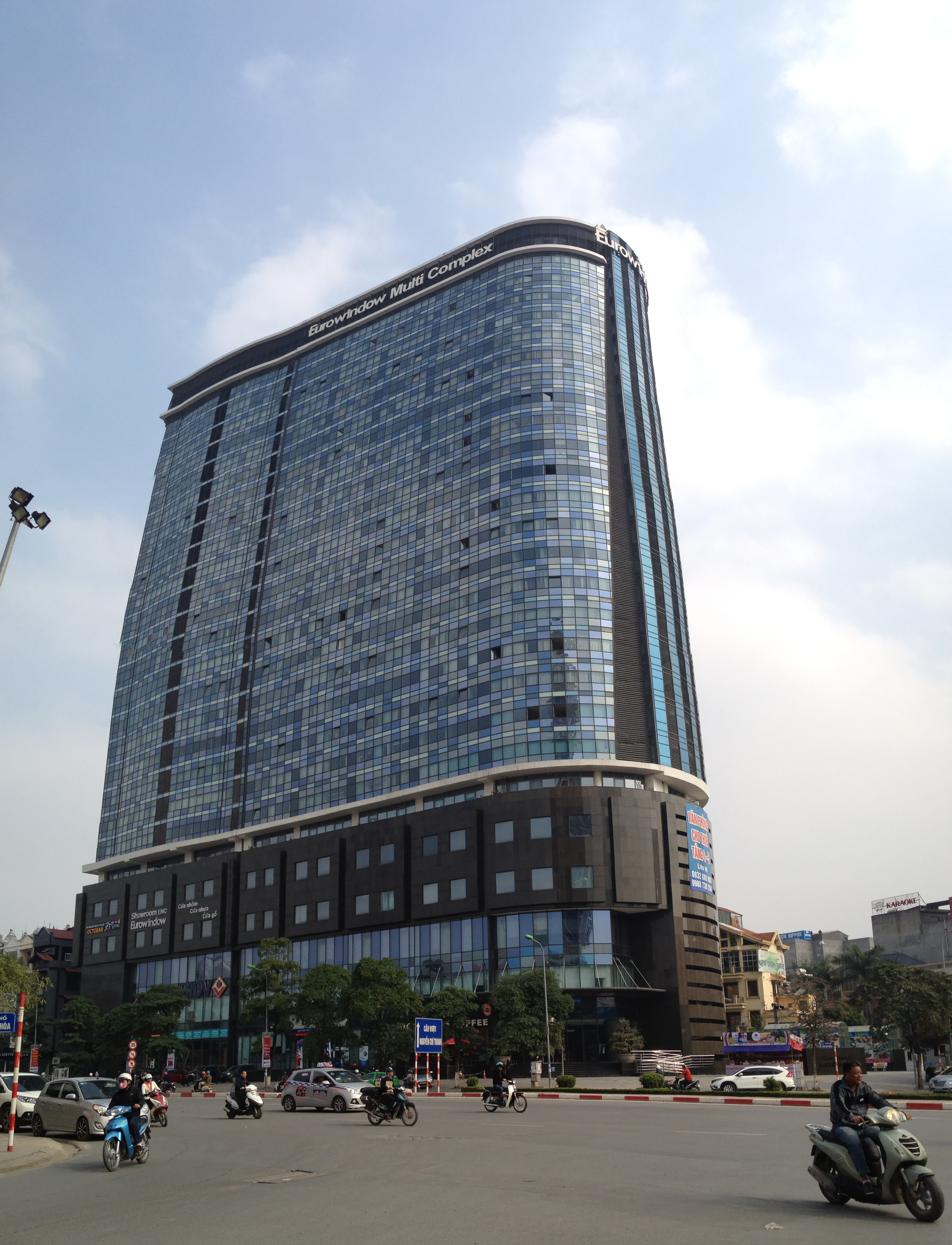
Eurowindow Multi Complex

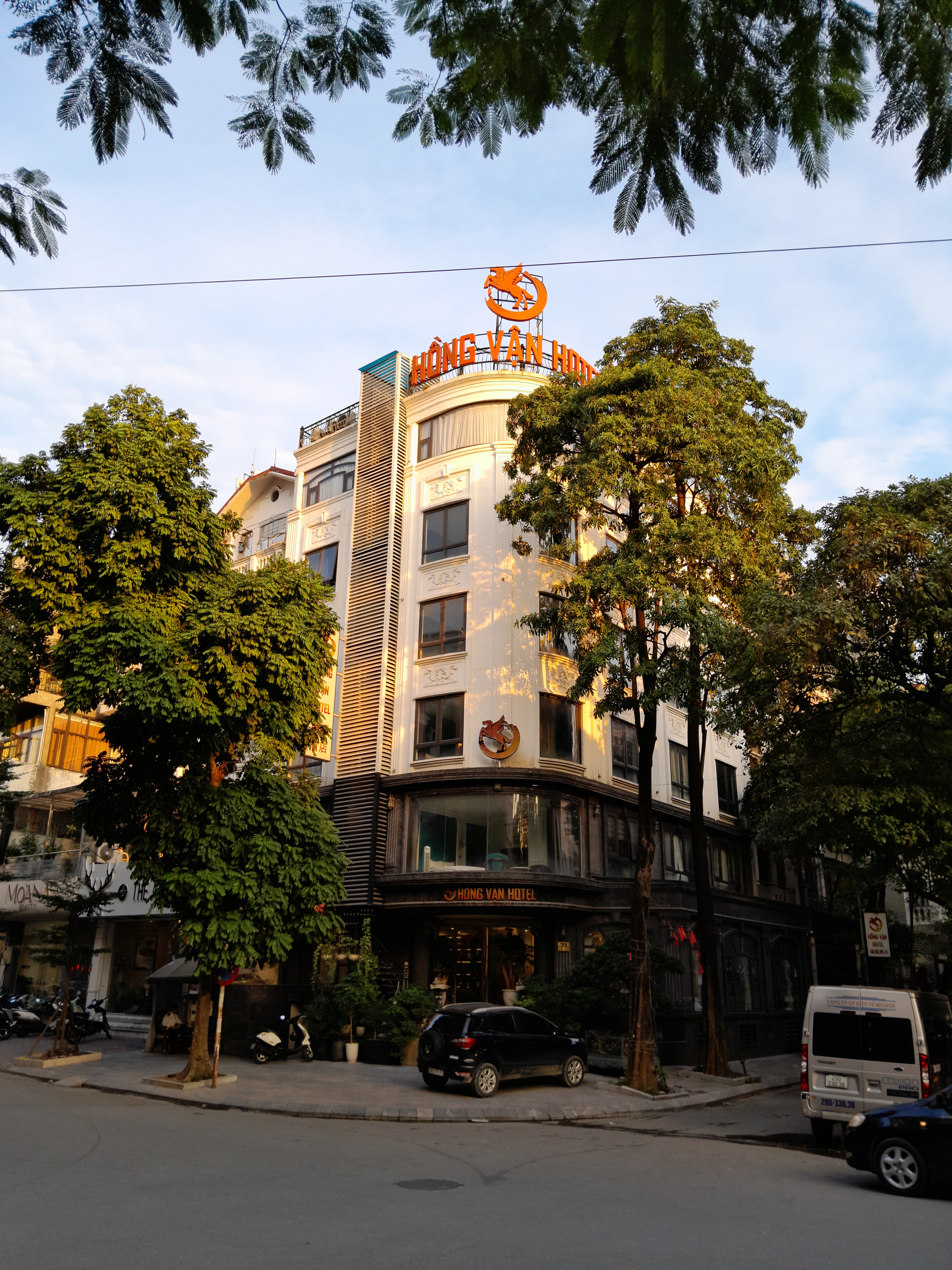
Hồng Vận Hotel

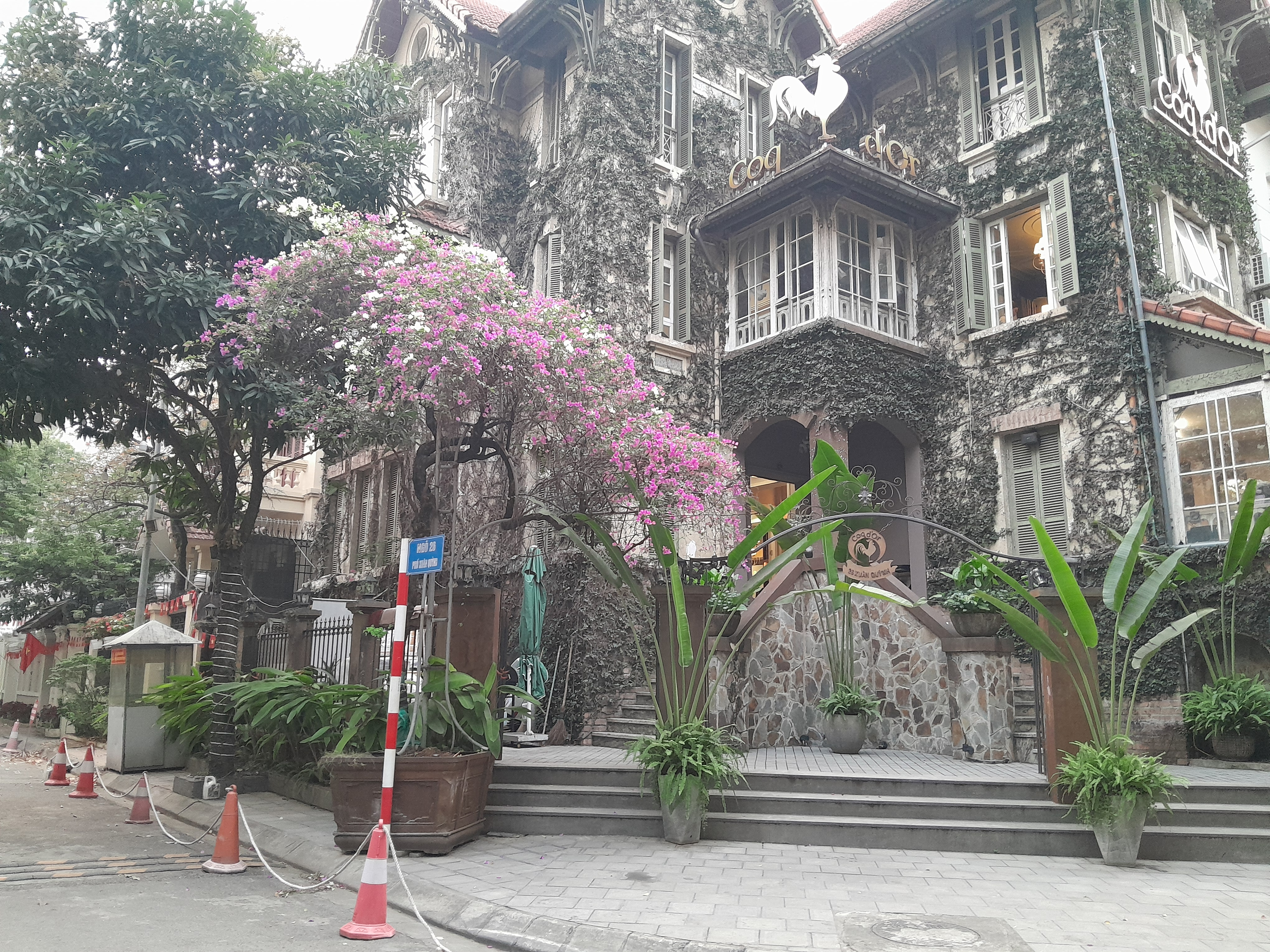
Coq d'Or Restaurant

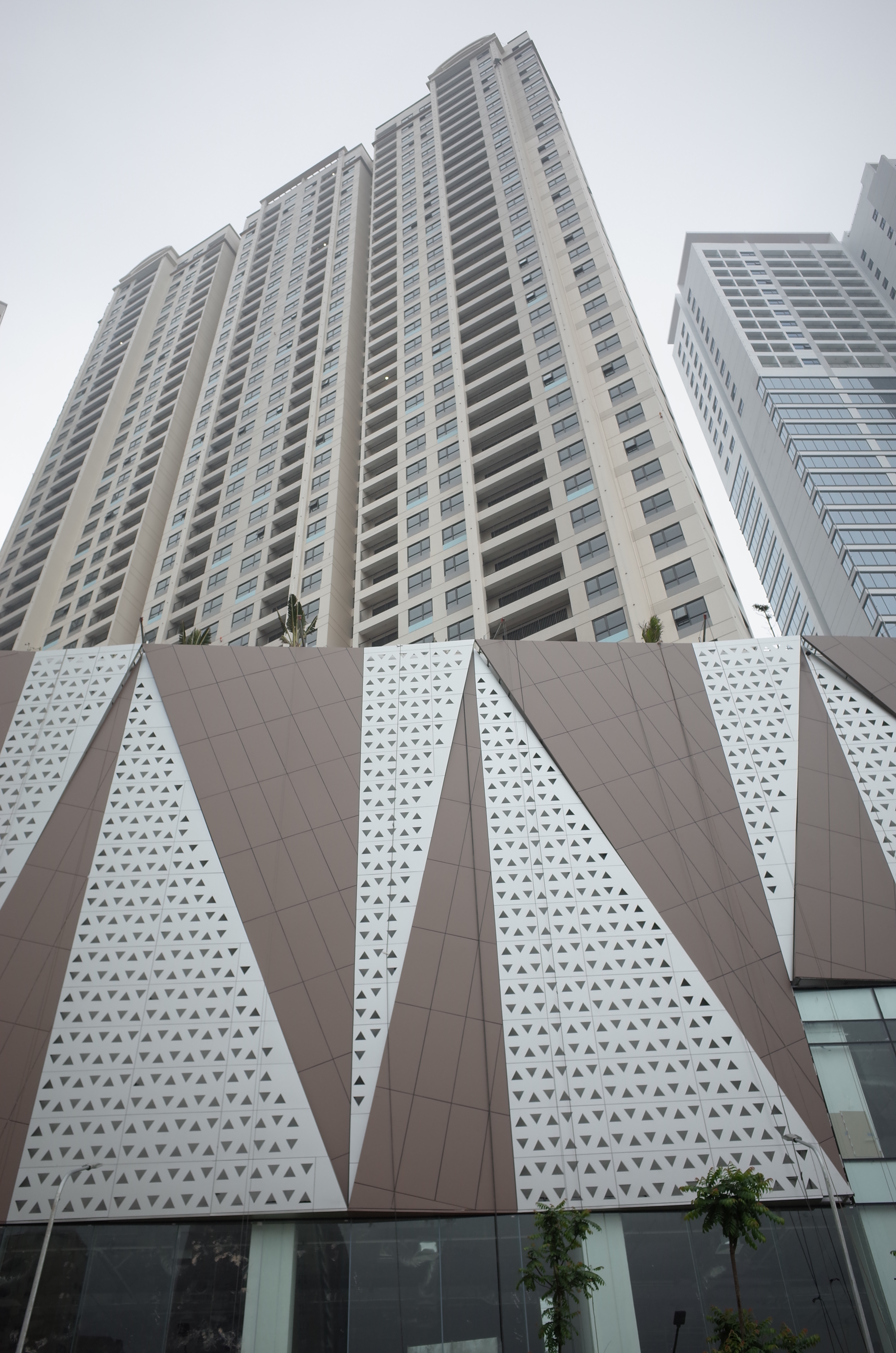
Vincom City Center

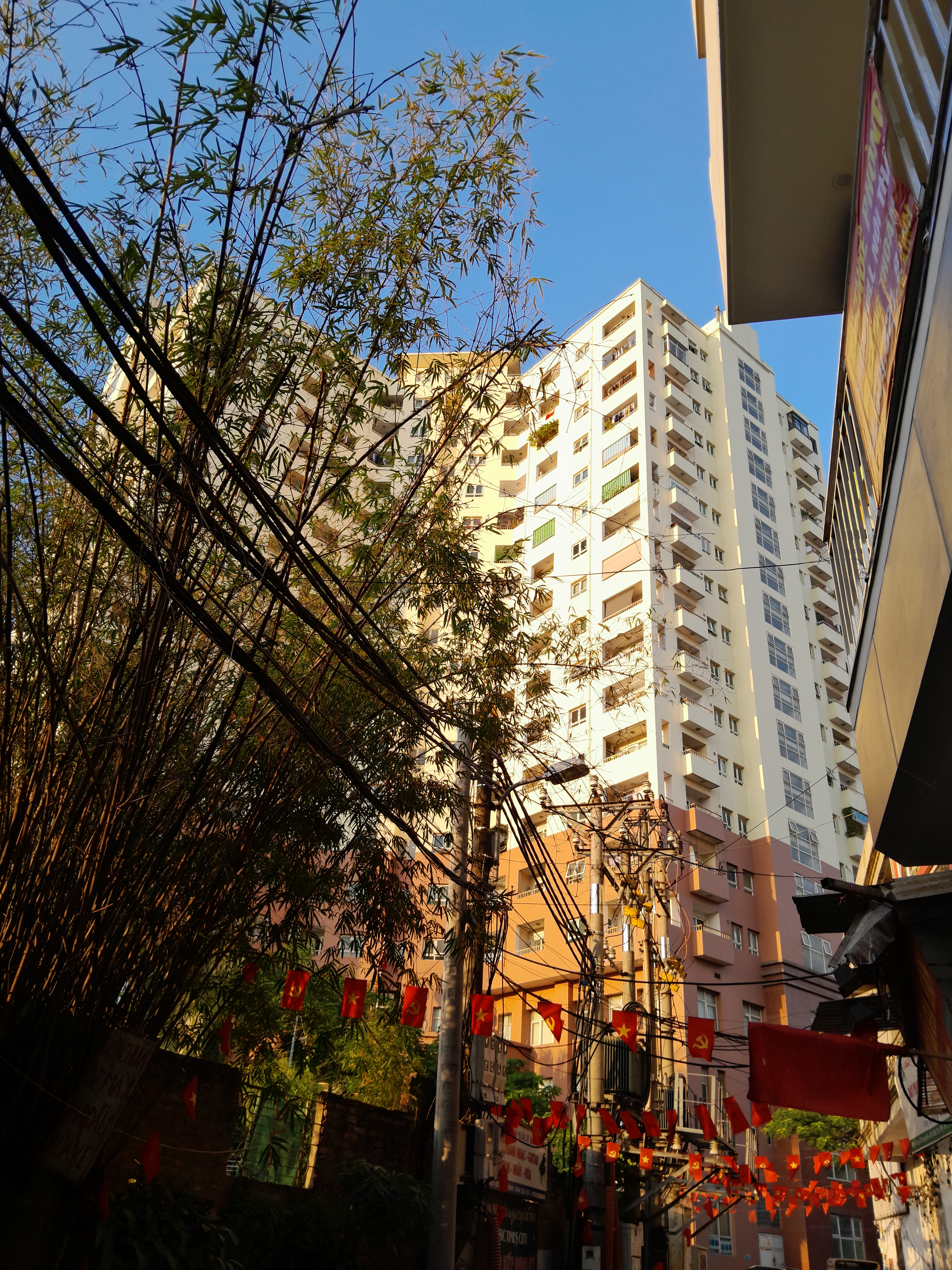
Trung Yên 1 Apartments

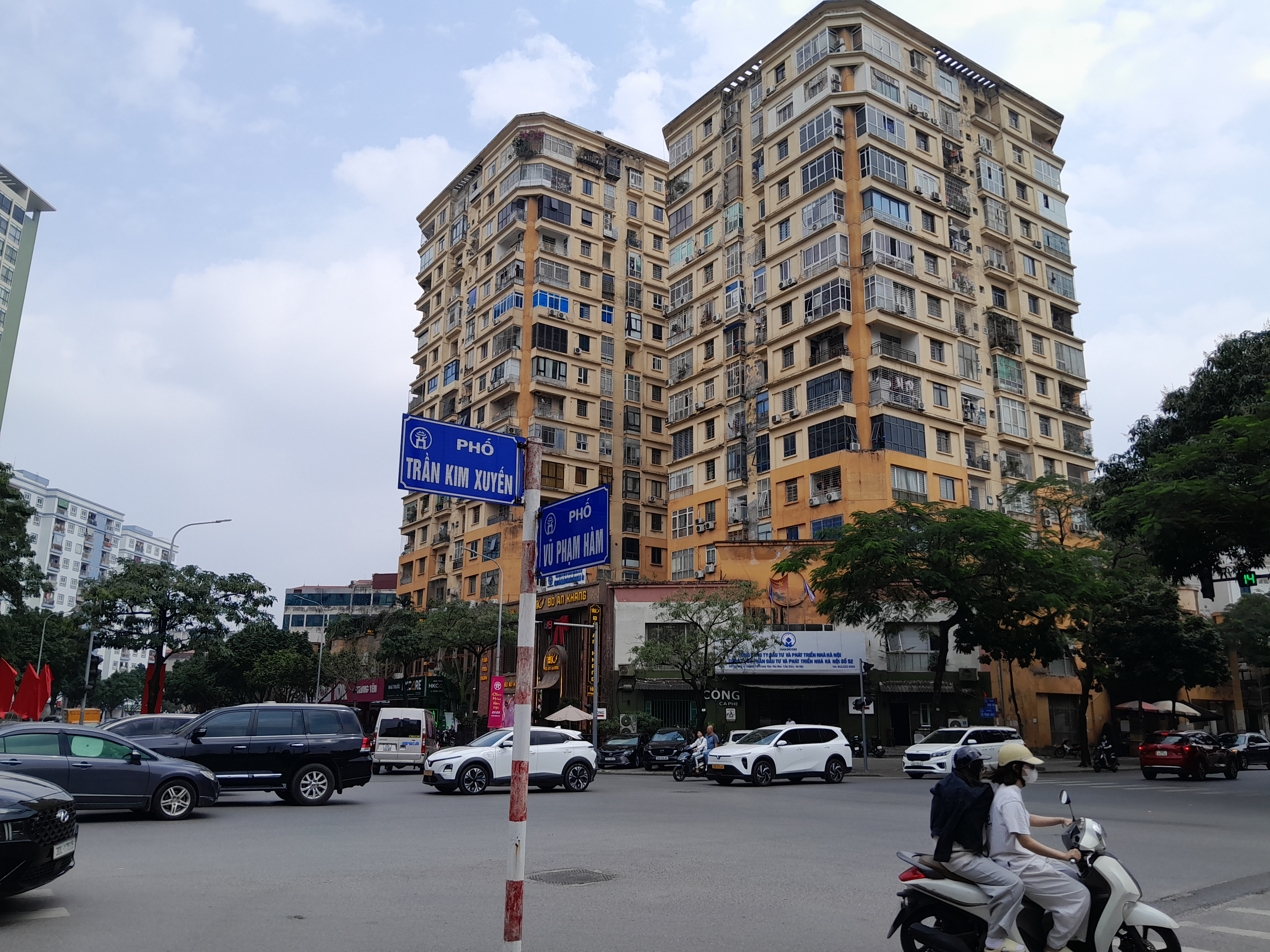
Quốc Sỹ Apartments

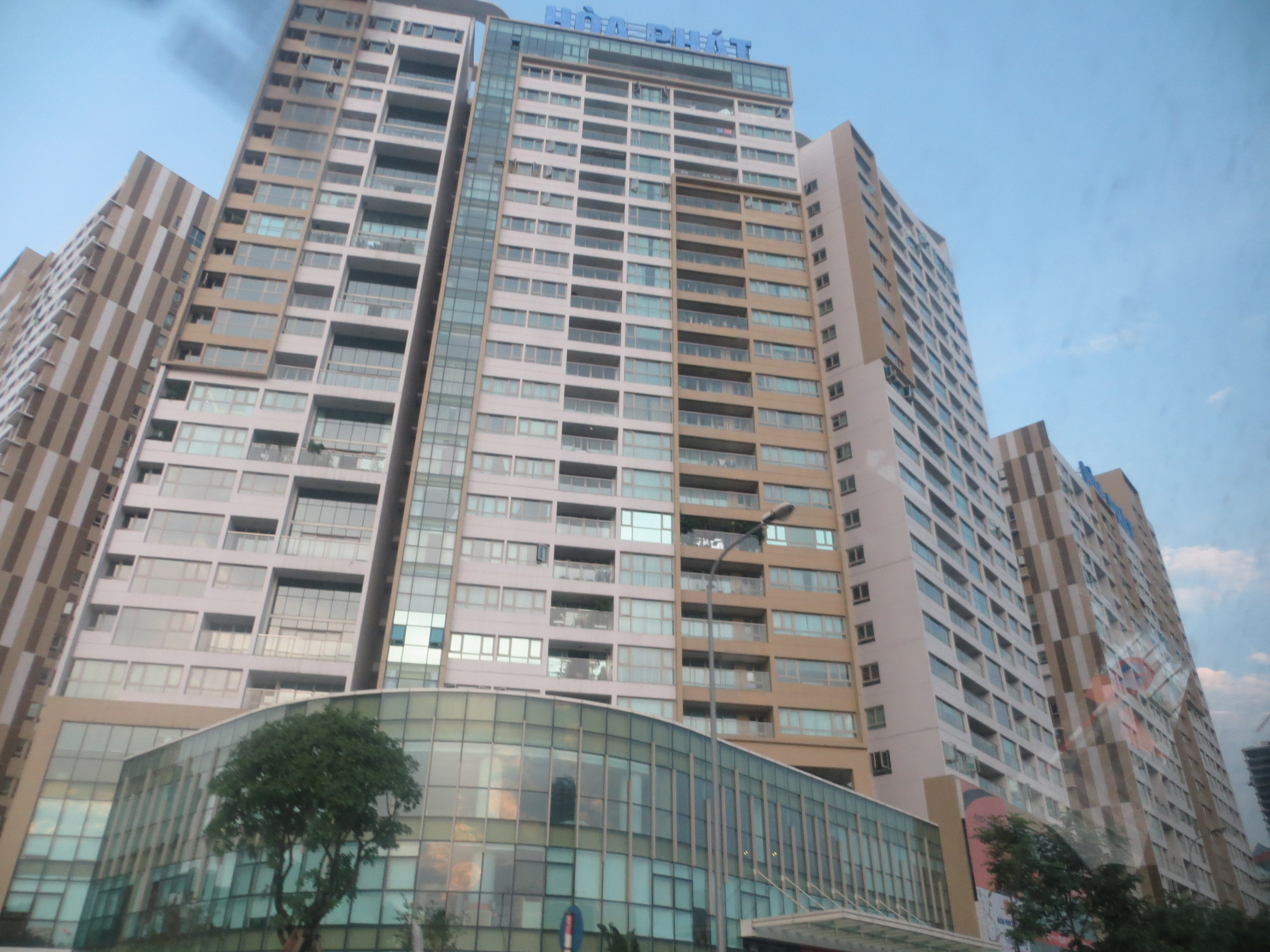
Mandarin Garden Apartments

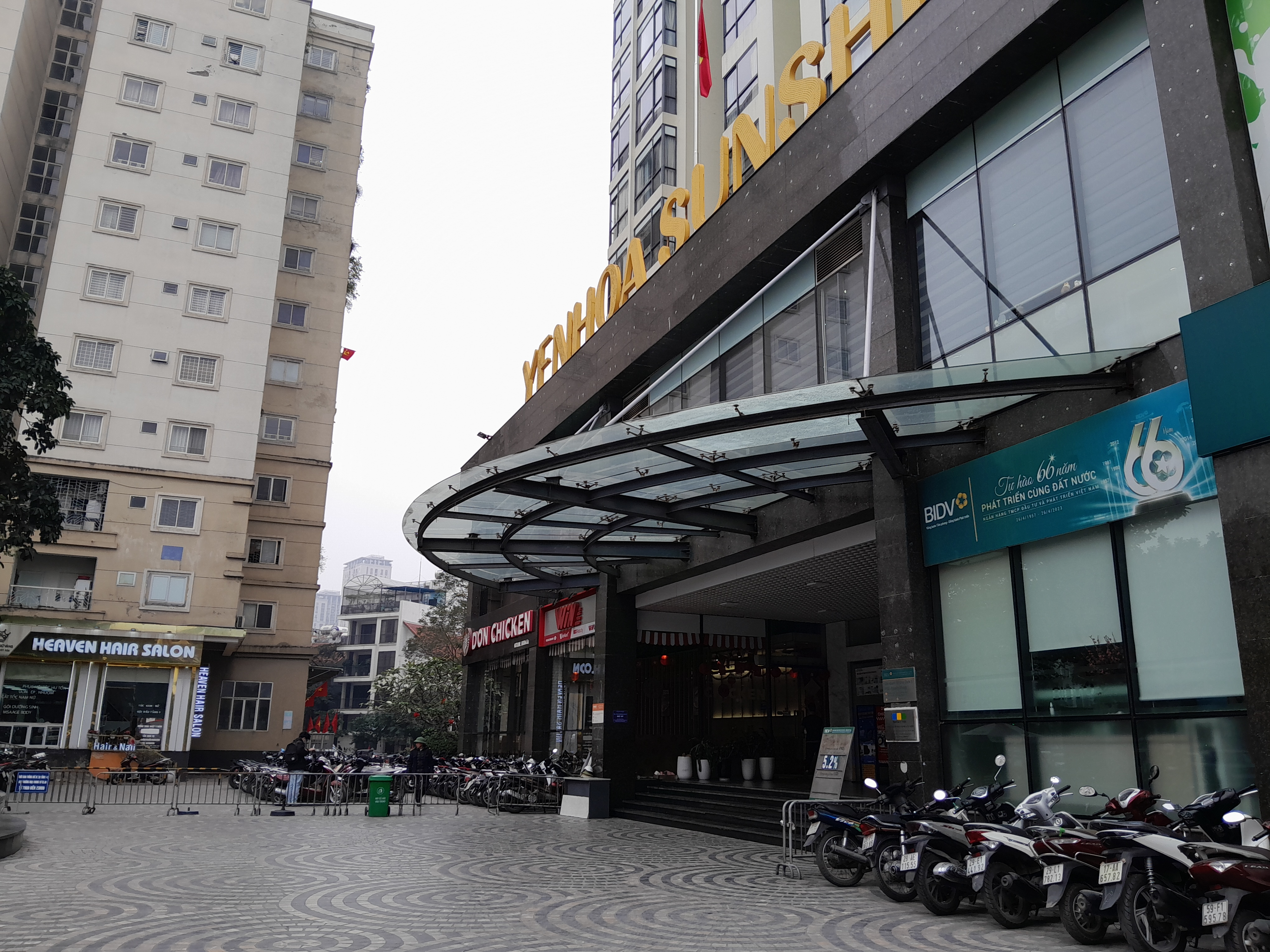
Yên Hòa Sunshine Apartments

=== Education ===
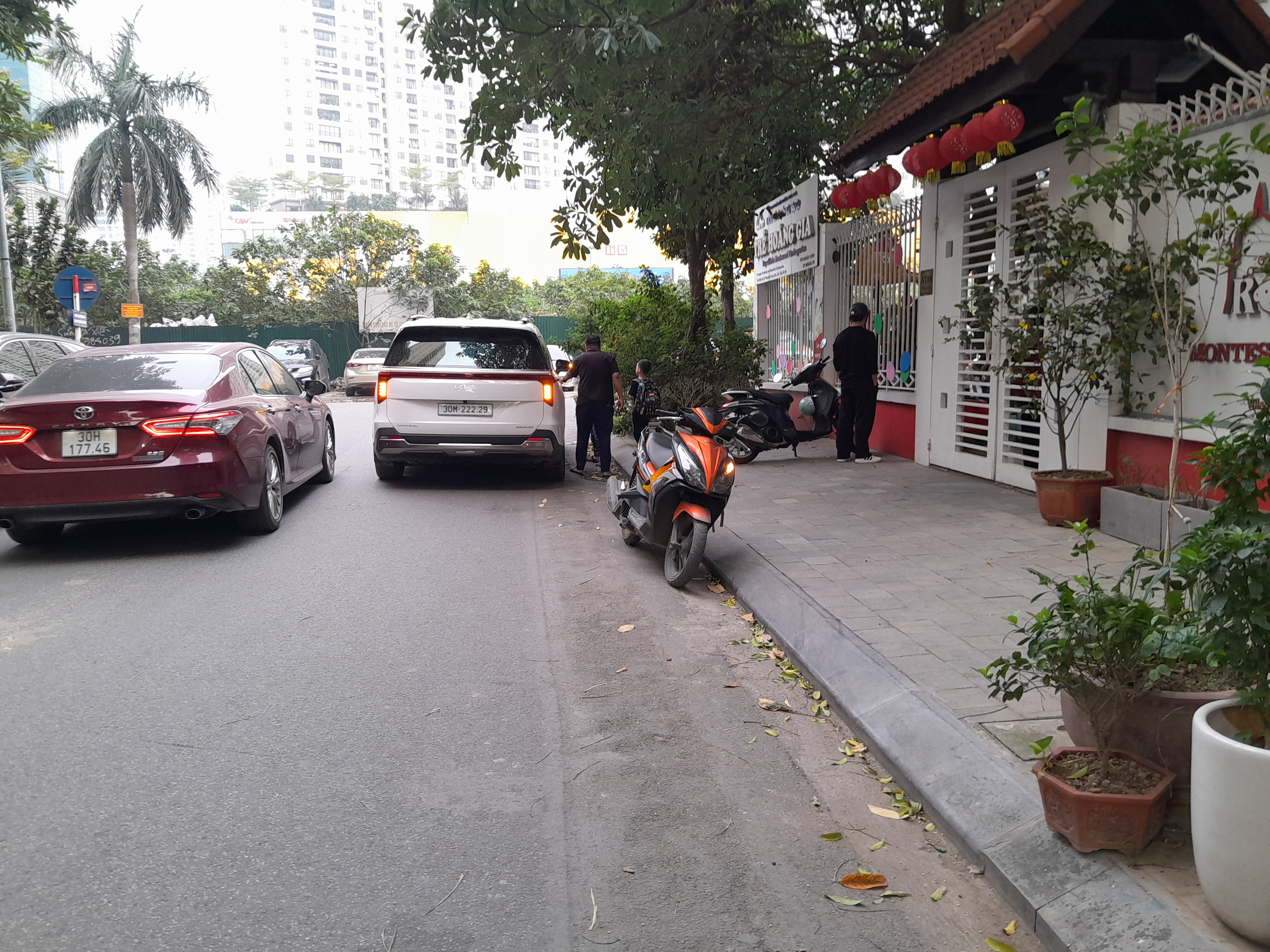
RoyalKidz Montessori Kindergarten

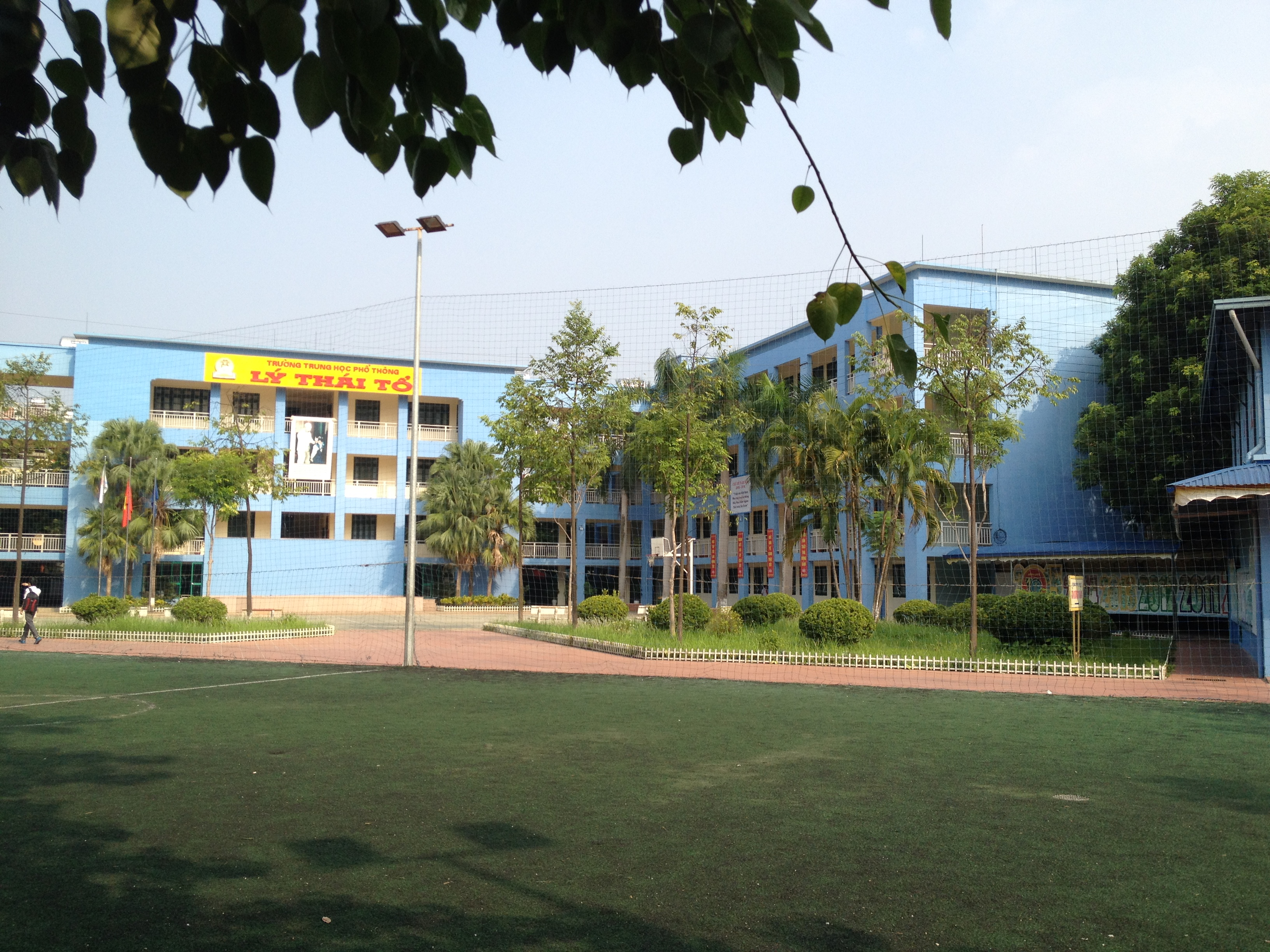
Lý Thái Tổ Schools

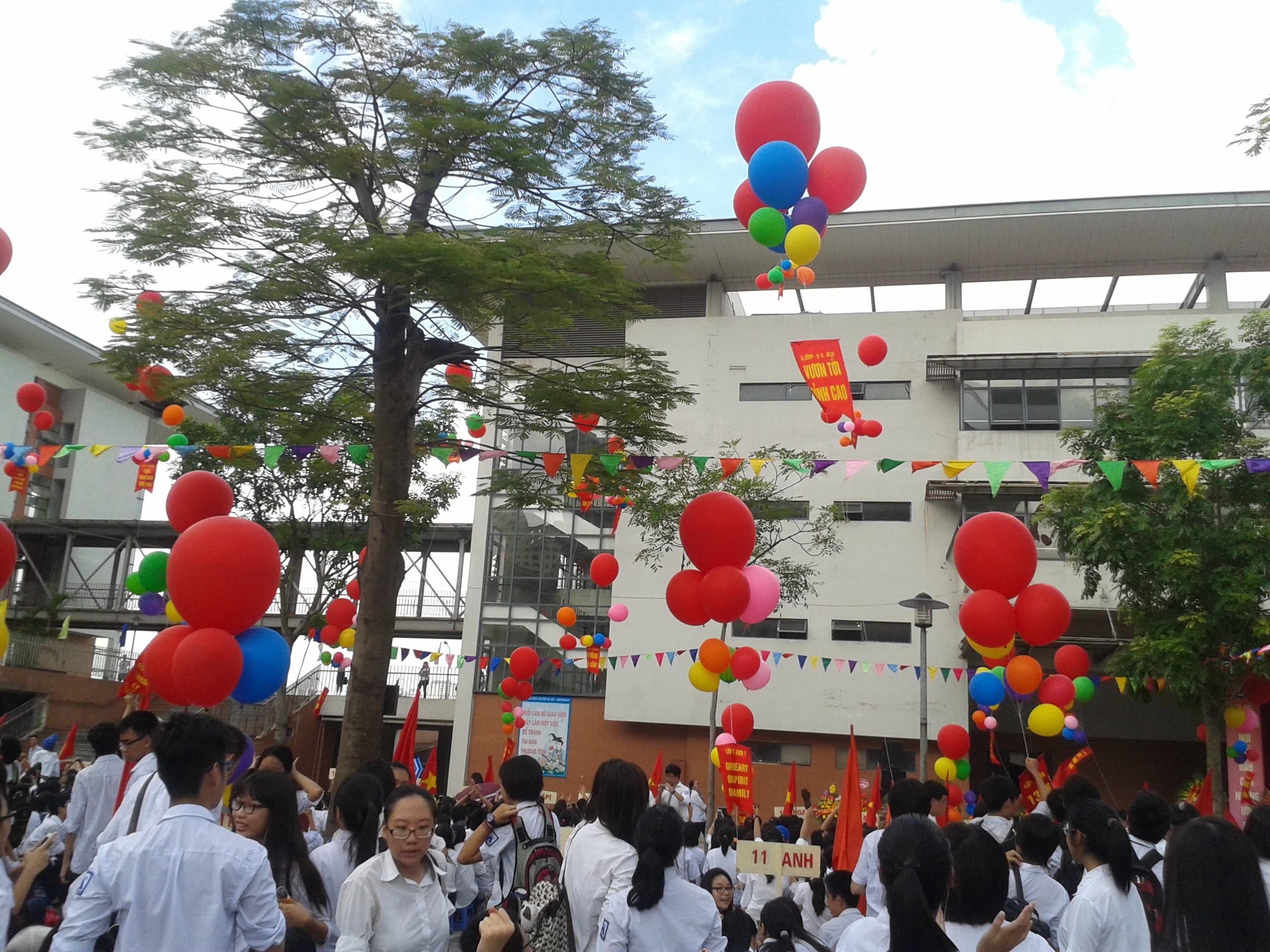
Hanoiamsterdam High School

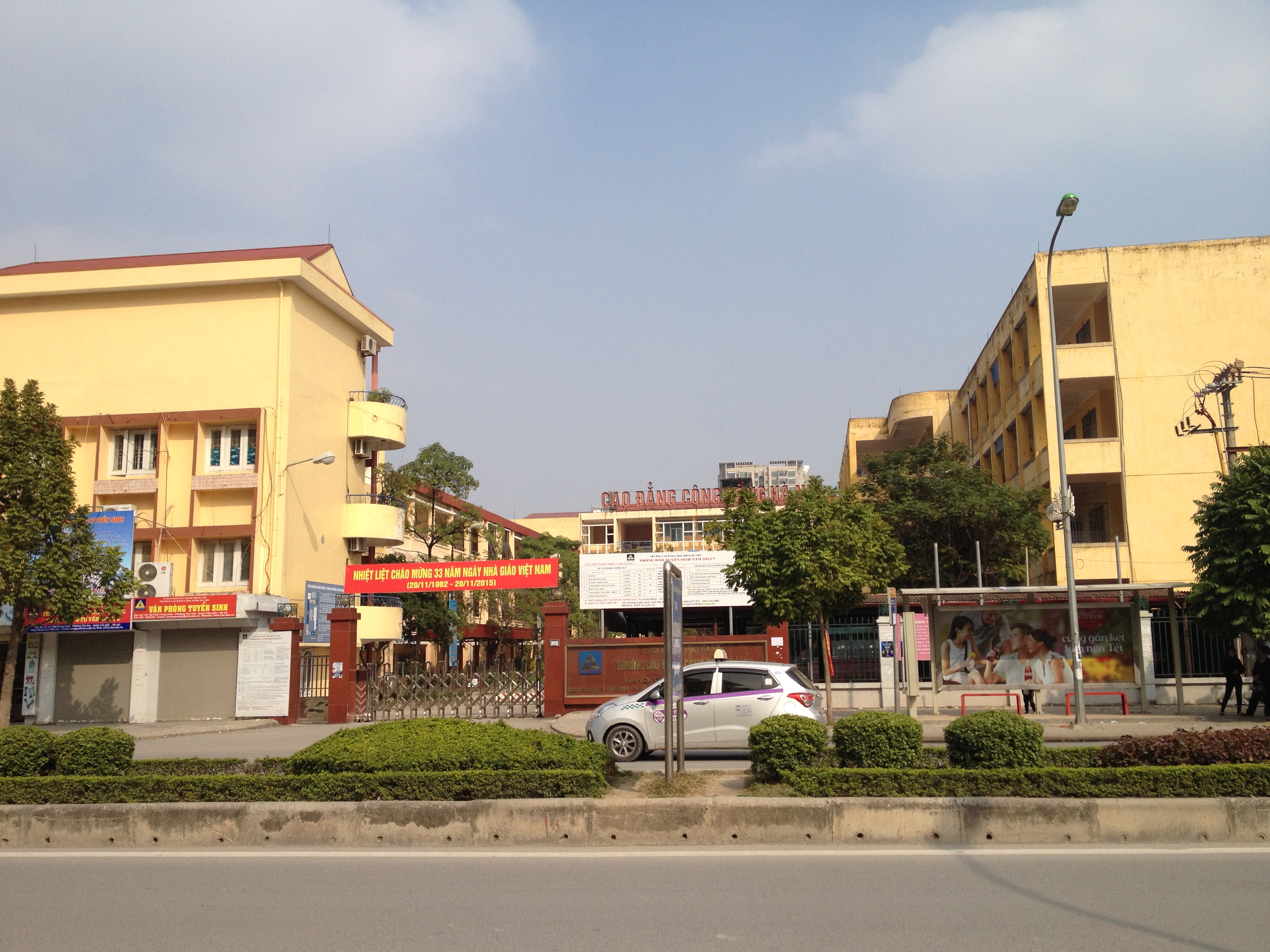
Hanoi Community College

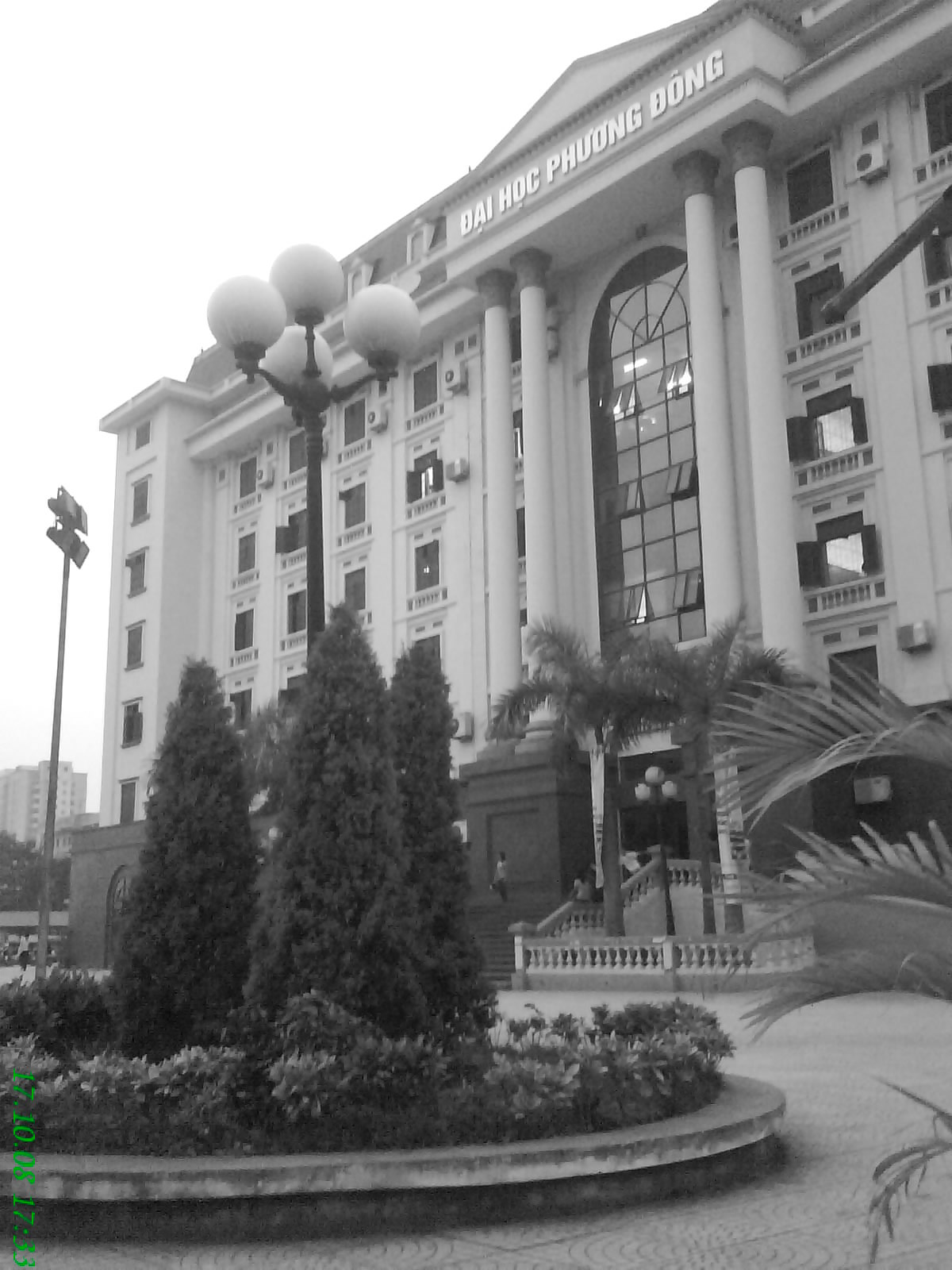
Phương Đông University

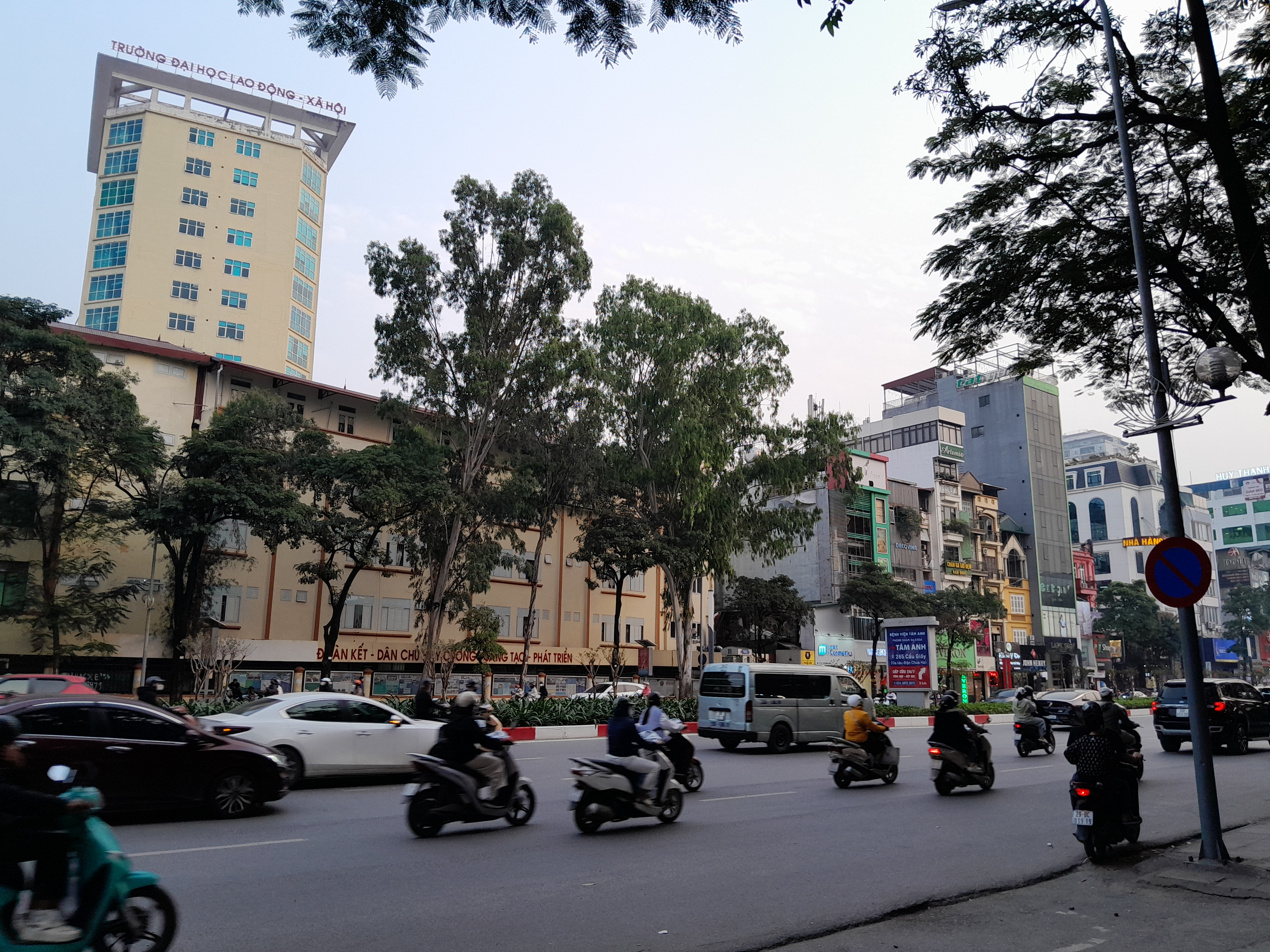
University of Labour and Social Affairs

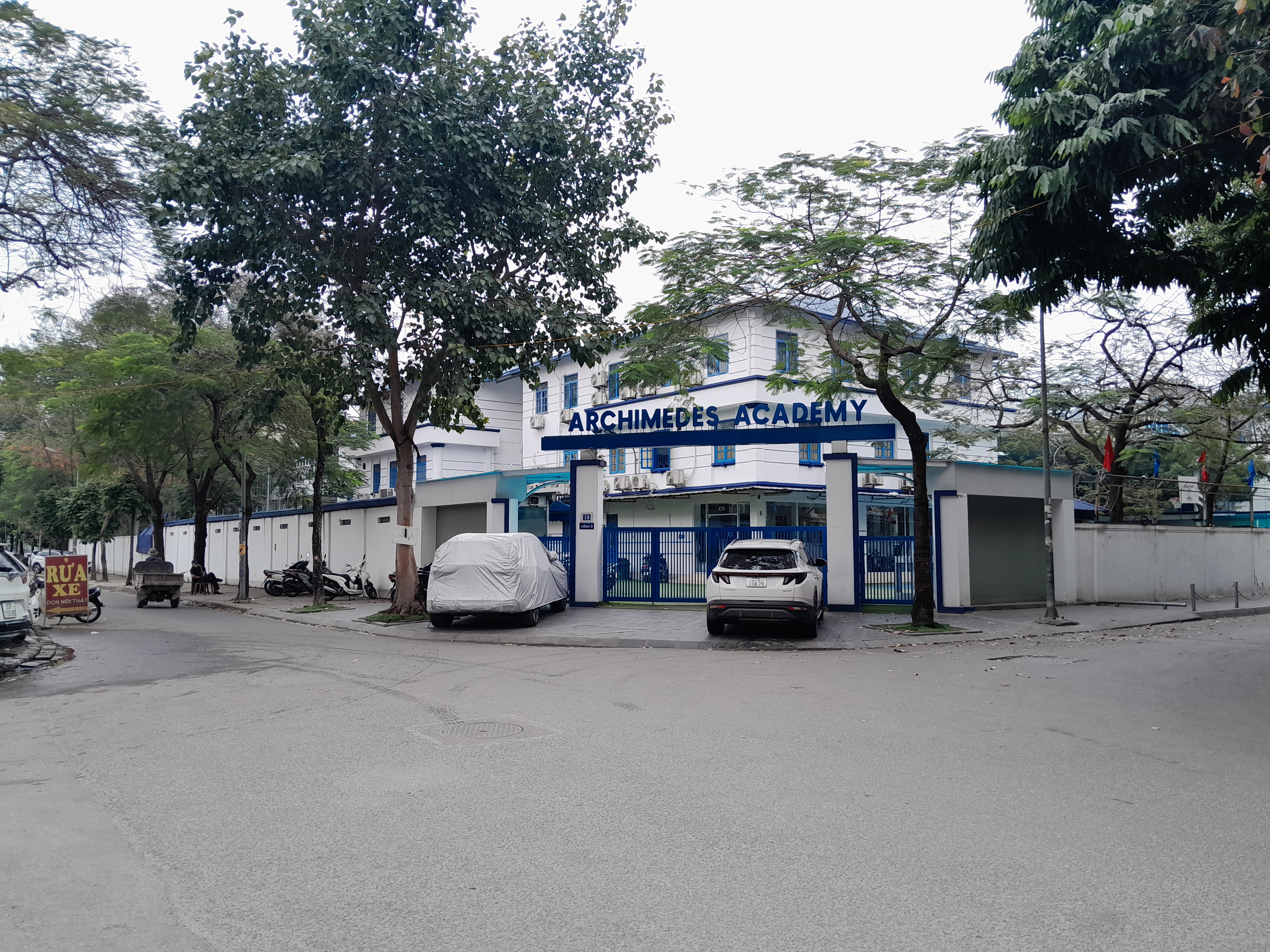
Archimedes Academy

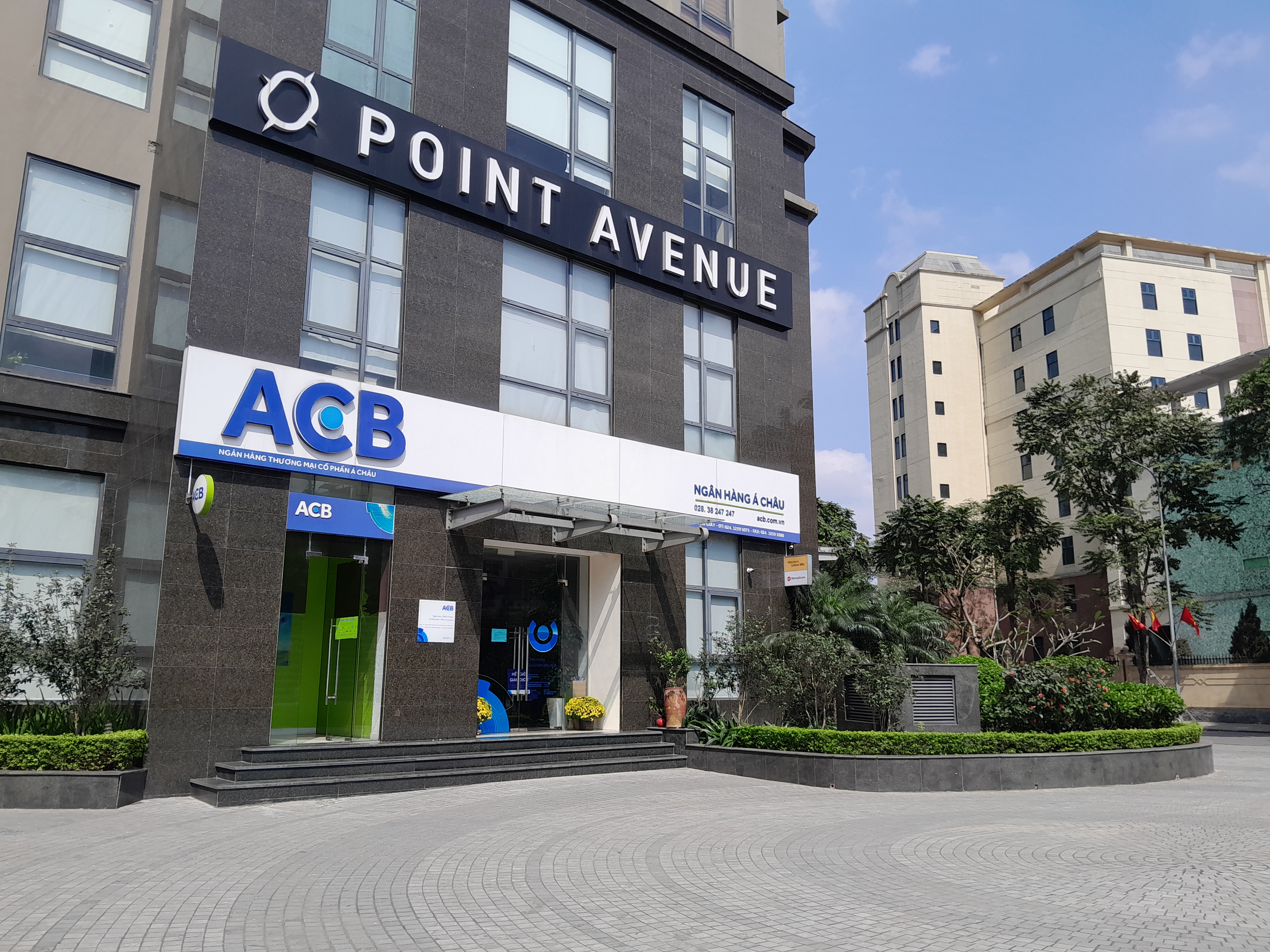
Point Avenue PTE (Note: It was founded in Hanoi 2018 by a group of West Point graduates but exists independently of that organization.)

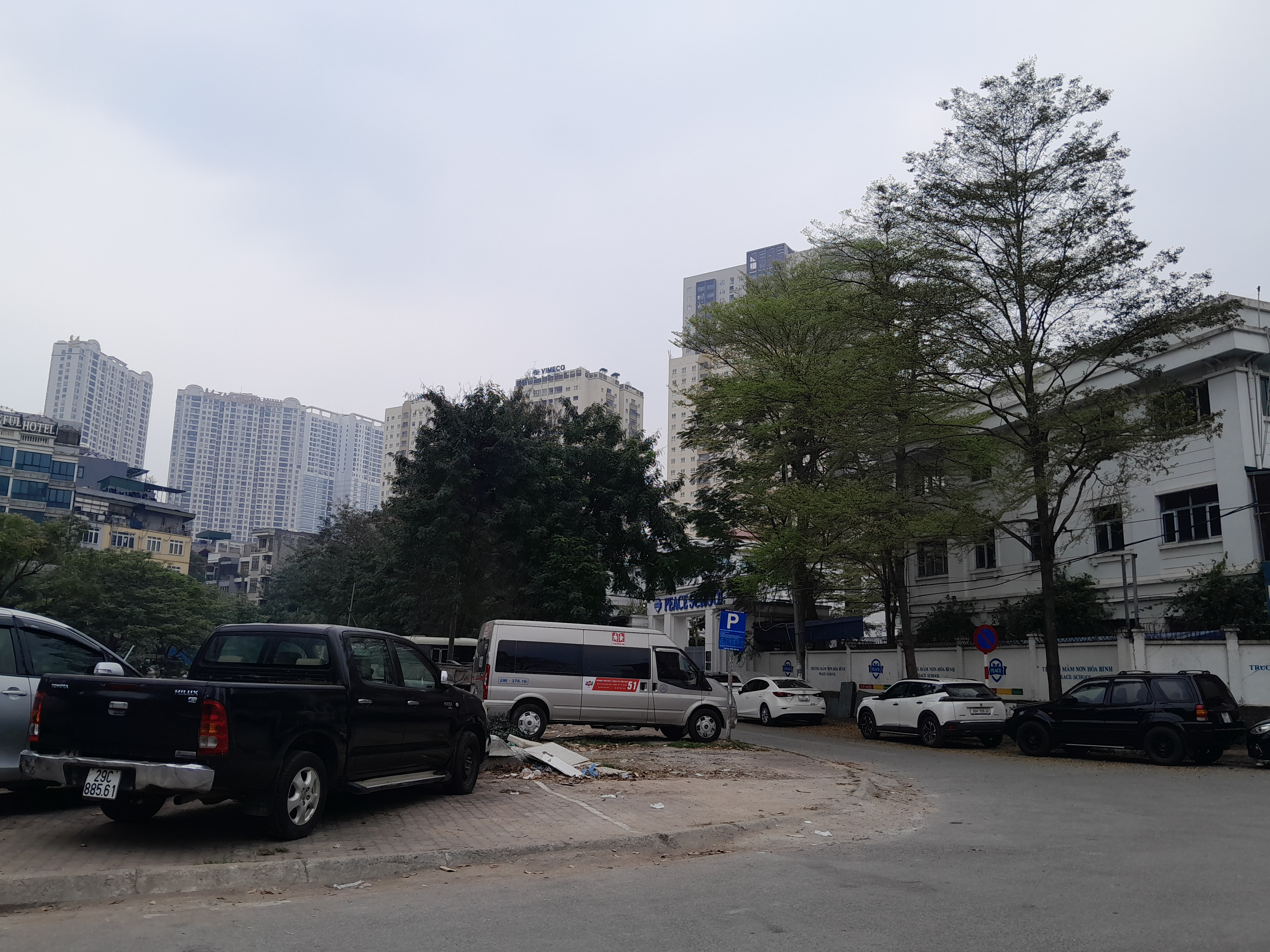
Peace School

=== Famous persons ===
Pre-1986

- Composer Chung Quân
- Composer Doãn Nho
- Writer Doãn Quốc Sỹ
- Doctorate Đặng Công Toản
- Doctorate Đỗ Công Toản
- Doctorate Đỗ Văn Luân
- Doctorate Đỗ Văn Tổng
- Doctorate Hoàng Bôi
- Doctorate Minh Tuyền Hoàng Chí Trị
- Doctorate Hoàng Quán Chi
- Scholar Hoa Bằng Hoàng Thúc Trâm
- Scholar Hoàng Xuân Sính
- Doctorate Hoàng Viết Ái
- Journalist Học Phi
- Shaman Lê Đại Điên
- Reciter Linh Nhâm
- Doctorate Nguyễn Công Thước
- Doctorate Nguyễn Danh Hiền
- Doctorate Nguyễn Dụng Nghệ
- Doctorate Nguyễn Dụng Triêm
- First doctoral candidate Nguyễn Hiền
- Doctorate Nguyễn Huy
- Writer Nguyễn Huy Tưởng
- Doctorate Nguyễn Khiêm Quang
- Doctorate Nguyễn Như Uyên
- Doctor degree Nguyễn Quang Minh (Nguyễn Nhữ Minh)
- Doctorate Nguyễn Sần
- Doctorate Nguyễn Xuân Nham
- Doctorate Nguyễn Viết Tráng (Nguyễn Nhật Tráng)
- Doctorate Nguyễn Vĩnh Thịnh
- Poet Thanh Tâm Tuyền
- Writer Trung Trung Đỉnh
- Poet Tú Mỡ
- Zen master Từ Đạo Hạnh

Modern

- Fimmaker Bùi Chí Trung
- Footballer Đỗ Hùng Dũng
- Actress Hoàng Hà
- Shooter Hoàng Xuân Vinh
- Actress Hoàng Yến Chibi
- Actor Lê Bá Anh
- Actress Trần Thị Minh Hòa
- Actress Nguyễn Ngọc Thư
- Lawyer Nguyễn Danh Huế
- Painter Nguyễn Đại Thắng
- Actor Nguyễn Đình Khang
- Actor Phạm Minh Tuấn
- MC & content editor Nguyễn Quốc Khánh
- Female model Nguyễn Quỳnh Anh
- Actress Quỳnh Kool
- Singer Soobin Hoàng Sơn

== See also ==
- Cầu Giấy
- Đại Mỗ
- Định Công
- Đống Đa
- Hà Đông
- Láng
- Khương Đình
- Nghĩa Đô
- Ô Chợ Dừa
- Thanh Xuân
- Từ Liêm
- Văn Miếu – Quốc Tử Giám
