= Beyond Granite: Pulling Together =

American contemporary art exhibition

- Beyond Granite: Pulling Together (Central Washington, D.C.) Exhibition sites on the National Mall
- Date: August 18–September 18, 2023
- Venue: National Mall
- Location: Washington, D.C.
- Type: Art exhibition
- Theme: Monuments, memorials
- Patron: Andrew W. Mellon Foundation
- Organized by: Trust for the National Mall, National Capital Planning Commission, National Park Service
- Curators: Monument Lab (Paul Farber, Salamishah Tillet)
- Artists: Derrick Adams, Tiffany Chung, Ashon Crawley, vanessa german, Paul Ramírez Jonas, Wendy Red Star

Beyond Granite: Pulling Together is the title of a contemporary art exhibition held on the National Mall in Washington, D.C., from August to September 2023. Organized by the Trust for the National Mall, the National Capital Planning Commission, and the National Park Service, and curated by the nonprofit Monument Lab, Pulling Together was the first curated outdoor art exhibition in the Mall's history and the first in a planned series of outdoor exhibitions and installations under the Beyond Granite moniker.

Curators Paul Farber and Salamishah Tillet commissioned six contemporary artists to create new works that responded to the exhibition's central question, as explained by Farber: "What stories remain untold on the National Mall?" The resulting installations were opened to the public on August 18, 2023, and were widely praised by critics.

== Background ==
The National Capital Planning Commission (NCPC) – the federal agency tasked with regional planning for the Washington area – has regularly received requests from artists, organizations, and the public to install new monuments or memorials on the National Mall; given the historic nature of the site and the finite amount of space on the Mall, the NCPC has approved few additional monuments. Similarly, the Trust for the National Mall (TNM) – the independent nonprofit that partners with the National Park Service (NPS) to maintain and preserve the Mall – has been approached by artists and organizations "on an ad-hoc basis" to install work temporarily on the Mall, according to a TNM executive vice president, with notable examples including the multiple showings of the NAMES Project AIDS Memorial Quilt.

The NCPC, TNM, and NPS originally partnered to find a solution to the demand for additional monuments and memorials on the Mall while respecting the physical limitations of the site to avoid long-term overcrowding, eventually choosing temporary, curated outdoor exhibitions as a starting point for experimentation. The exhibition organizers have called this the first curated outdoor group art exhibition in the National Mall's history. The three organizations, with TNM leading the project, applied for and received $4.5 million in funding from the Andrew W. Mellon Foundation in 2021 for the project as part of the foundation's initiative The Monuments Project.

In 2022, the organizers selected Monument Lab – a nonprofit public art and research organization based in Philadelphia – to curate the first exhibition in the project. Monument Lab has extensively studied the landscape of monuments and memorials in the United States, releasing several audit reports on the demographics of both artists and those memorialized, both of which skew overwhelmingly white and male. Additionally, the nonprofit has curated several exhibitions and installations of public art and temporary monuments or memorials across the United States. Monument Lab co-founder Paul Farber invited professor and critic Salamishah Tillet to co-curate the exhibition with him.

Farber and Tillet, working with several advisory groups, chose a single question to serve as the central inspiration for artists in the exhibition: "What stories remain untold on the National Mall?" The curators invited artists to view different areas of the Mall and research the histories of its monuments and surrounding communities, asking them to create work that responded to both the physical site and the history of the Mall. The exhibition organizers released the list of participating artists in December 2022 along with renderings of their proposed works.

The exhibition opened to the public on August 18, 2023, and remained open for one month, through September 18. At the opening ceremony for the exhibition, NPS Director Charles Sams said "Beyond Granite: Pulling Together does not shy away from those aspects in our history that can be very hurtful to Americans. We must tell those untold stories fiercely.” Following the opening of the exhibition, Axios reported that National Mall superintendent Jeff Reinbold had called Pulling Together "a test" for the efficacy and feasibility of the broader Beyond Granite initiative.

== Participating artists and works ==
Farber and Tillet invited six contemporary American artists to participate in the exhibition: Derrick Adams, Tiffany Chung, Ashon Crawley, vanessa german, Paul Ramírez Jonas, and Wendy Red Star. The artists created work in a range of mediums, including sculpture, installation art, sound art, and interactive art.

- Derrick Adams (b. 1970)
  - America's Playground: DC (2023), Powder-coated steel, polymer printed panel, and thermoplastic Vulcanizate (surfacing)
  - Work sited in Constitution Gardens East
- Tiffany Chung (b. 1969)
  - For the Living (2023), Mixed-media earthwork
  - Work sited in Constitution Gardens West, near the Vietnam Veterans Memorial
- Ashon Crawley (b. 1980)
  - HOMEGOING (2023), Mixed-media sound installation
  - Work sited at Washington Monument South grounds
- vanessa german (b. 1976)
  - Of Thee We Sing (2023), Steel, resin, and archival photographs
  - Work sited in Lincoln Memorial plaza
- Paul Ramírez Jonas (b. 1965)
  - Let Freedom Ring (2023), Steel, bronze, 32 automated bells, participant-activated bell, and patriotic song
  - Work sited near Smithsonian Metro station at 12th St NW
- Wendy Red Star (b. 1981)
  - The Soil You See... (2023), Glass and granite rock
  - Work sited on Constitution Gardens island, at the Memorial to the 56 Signers of the Declaration of Independence

At least one work in the show was acquired by a museum prior to the opening of the exhibition. The Soil You See... (2023) by Red Star was acquired by the Tippet Rise Art Center, Fishtail, Montana, while Of Thee We Sing (2023) by german is scheduled to be exhibited at The Frick Pittsburgh.

== Reception ==
Writing in The New York Times, critic Blake Gopnik said that works in the exhibition exhibited a duality wherein "a work might succeed on one dimension (maybe by undermining traditional, Guy-on-a-Horse ideas about monumentality) in the very act of failing on another (say, to achieve the visceral power of an old-fashioned monument)," further noting that this perceived tension gives the exhibition "the flexible meaning we want from good art." Gopnik praised Red Star and Adams' works in particular, noting a "potent tension" between Red Star's work and the Memorial to the 56 Signers of the Declaration of Independence, which it was sited next to, and calling Adams' interactive playground "monumental art with zero pomposity."

Writing in The Washington Post, critic Philip Kennicott praised the exhibition, saying that "it proves something that has been obvious for decades: The Mall may be overstuffed with traditional monuments, memorials and museums, but it is no way a substantially completed work of public art. Exhibitions like this one should be an annual endeavor."
