= 1744 in art =

Events from the year 1744 in art.

== Works ==
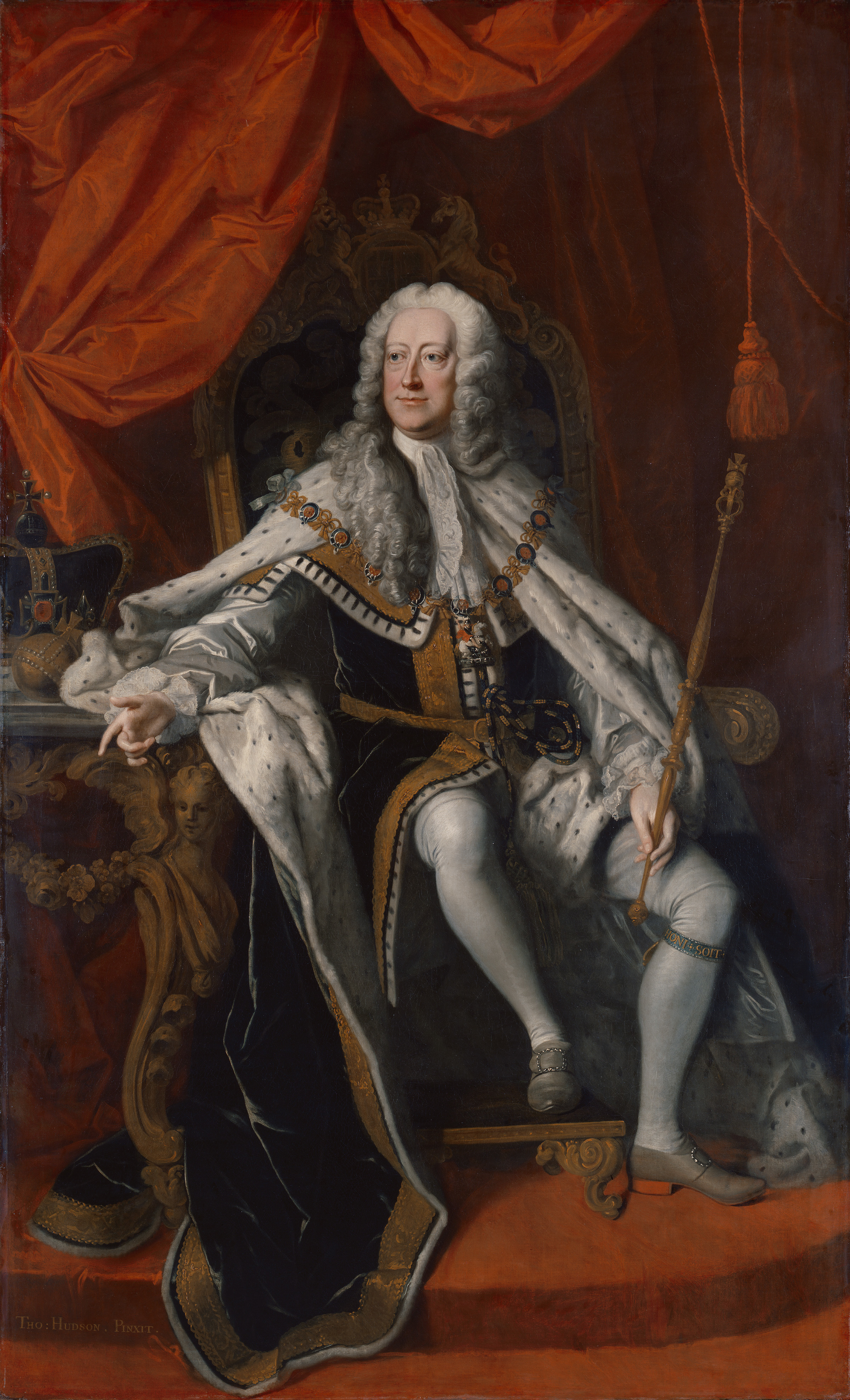
Portrait of George II by Thomas Hudson

- Bernardo Bellotto – Vaprio d'Adda (Metropolitan Museum of Art, New York)
- Canaletto (British Royal Collection)
  - Entrance to the Grand Canal, looking east
  - Piazza S. Marco, looking south
  - Piazza S. Marco, looking west
- Charles-Michel-Ange Challe – Sleeping Diana
- Georg Desmarées – Portrait of Franz Joachim Beich
- Thomas Hudson – Portrait of George II
- Jean-Étienne Liotard – The Chocolate Girl (approximate date)
- Giovanni Paolo Panini – The Lottery in Piazza di Montecitorio
- Giovanni Battista Tiepolo
  - The Banquet of Cleopatra (National Gallery of Victoria)
  - Ceiling paintings in Würzburg Residence
  - Translation of the House of Loreto (frescos in Church of the Scalzi (Venice); destroyed 1915 (approximate completion date))
  - Decorations for Villa Cordellini (Montecchio Maggiore)
- Christian Friedrich Zincke – Miniature portrait of Sir Robert Walpole in Garter robes

== Births ==
- February 13 – David Allan, Scottish painter (died 1796)
- July 9 – François-Guillaume Ménageot, French painter of religious and French historical scenes (died 1816)
- October 27 – Mary Moser, English painter primarily of flowers (died 1819)
- October 25 – Daniel Berger, German engraver (died 1825)
- October 28 – William Hodges, English landscape painter (died 1797)
- December 10
  - William Berczy, Canadian pioneer and painter (died 1813)
  - Thomas Parkinson, British portrait painter (died 1789)
- December 15 – Jean-François Pierre Peyron, French neoclassical painter (died 1814)
- December 21 – Anne Vallayer-Coster, French painter (died 1818)
- date unknown
  - Manuel Acevedo, Spanish painter (died 1800)
  - Prosper-Gabriel Audran, French engraver and teacher (died 1819)
  - Okada Beisanjin – Japanese painter (died 1820)
  - Hendrik de Meijer, Dutch painter (died 1793)
  - János Donát, Hungarian painter (died 1830)
  - Hermanus Numan, Dutch artist, art theorist, and publisher (died 1820)
  - Gabriel Gotthard Sweidel, Finnish church painter (died 1813)

== Deaths ==
- January 18 – Michele Marieschi, Italian painter of landscapes or vistas (a vedutisti) (born 1710)
- January 22 – Pierre Lepautre, French sculptor (born 1659)
- February 13 – Pierre Gobert, French painter (born 1662)
- February 17 – René Frémin, French sculptor (born 1672)
- March 9 – Giuseppe Zola, Italian painter of landscapes with small figures (born 1675)
- June 7 – Pietro Ercole Fava, Italian nobleman and art patron (born 1669)
- July 28 – Lorenzo De Ferrari, Italian painter of the Baroque period (born 1680)
- October – Domenico Maria Muratori, Bolognese (Italian) painter, studied under Lorenzo Pasinelli at Bologna (born 1661), painted La mort de Cléopâtre in the Louvre
- date unknown
  - Charles Collins, Irish painter primarily of animals and still-life (born 1680)
  - Marcantonio Riverditi – Italian painter of portraits and altarpieces (born unknown)
  - Maria Verelst, Dutch miniature and portrait painter (born 1680)
