= Wendy Red Star =

Native American contemporary artist (born 1981)

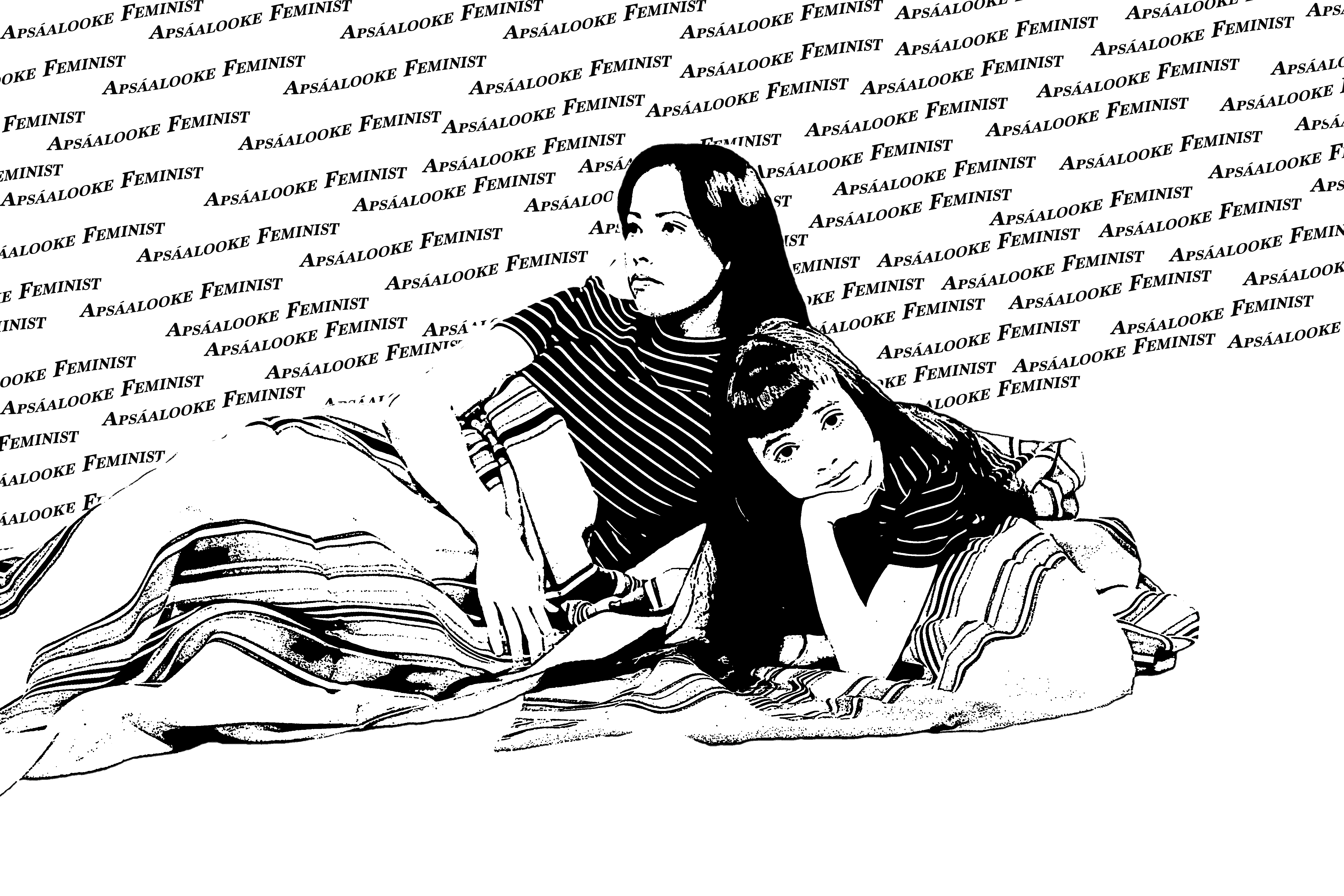
- Red Star, left, pictured in her work Ashkaamne (matrilineal inheritance) (2019)
- Born: 1981 (age 44–45); Billings, Montana, United States
- Education: Montana State University Bozeman, BFA; University of California Los Angeles, MFA
- Known for: Photography, installation, sculpture
- Awards: University of California, Los Angeles Departmental Award; Harriet P. Cushman Award, Bozeman Montana
- Website: wendyredstar.com

Wendy Red Star (born 1981) is an Apsáalooke contemporary multimedia artist born in Billings, Montana, in the United States. Her humorous approach and use of Native American images from traditional media draw the viewer into her work, while also confronting romanticized representations. She juxtaposes popular depictions of Native Americans with authentic cultural and gender identities. Her work has been described as "funny, brash, and surreal". Red Star was awarded a MacArthur Fellowship in 2024.

== Biography and education ==
Red Star was born in 1981 in Billings, Montana. She is of Apsáalooke (Crow) and Irish descent and was raised in Pryor, Montana, on the Crow Reservation, "a rural community that's also a sovereign nation and cultural powerhouse." At age 18, she left the reservation to attend Montana State University - Bozeman. She attended university between 2000 and 2004, and studied art and Native American Studies.

Growing up as biracial, Red Star experienced identity issues. In elementary school, she was afraid of her classmates knowing that her grandparents were white. When she left the reservation, she had to deal with "otherness": the responses she received to her identity and identity-based artwork often damaged her confidence. She later learned to embrace her identity and was completely comfortable with it at 26 when she had her daughter. She incorporated her cultural identity into her work, reflecting on her childhood and where she grew up.

Her mother was a public health nurse who encouraged Crow cultural pursuits; though Red Star herself did not speak Crow, her adopted Korean sister spoke fluent Crow as a child. Her father ranched and was a licensed pilot who played in the "Maniacs", an Indian rock band. Red Star's uncle Kevin Red Star and grandmother Amy Bright Wings were big influences to her practice.

Red Star's undergraduate and graduate level specialization was in sculpture. Her work also includes photography, fashion design, bead work, fiber art, performance art, and painting. In 2004, Red Star was awarded her Bachelor of Fine Art degree from Montana State University, Bozeman. Red Star furthered her studies at the University of California, Los Angeles where she earned a Master of Fine Art degree in 2006.

In 2012–2013, she was a manager at Chief Plenty Coups State Park, located in Pryor, Montana. In 2014, she moved to Portland, Oregon and worked on Medicine Crow and the 1880 Crow Peace Delegation. As of 2016, it was reported that Red Star works as a full-time artist in Portland.

She has lectured at Yale University, Connecticut; Dartmouth College, New Hampshire; the California Institute of the Arts, and Brown University, Rhode Island.

== Career ==
=== Critical reception ===
The Spokesman-Review noted, "Red Star works in a variety of media. Her fiber work blends traditional and contemporary elements, as in her pieces Rez Car Shawl and Basketball Shawl. Her photographs combine stereotypical and authentic images, references to the past and modern day. Many are self-portraits." Red Star's work often includes clichéd representations of Native Americans, colonialism, the environment, and her own family. The Gorman Museum at UC Davis described her work as layering "influences from her tribal background (Crow), daily surroundings, aesthetic experiences, collected ephemera and conjured histories that are both real and imagined." Though she often deals with serious issues of Native American culture, she often employs humor through the inclusion of inflatable animals, fake scenery, and other elements in the work. In her photography, Red Star often depicts herself in traditional elk-tooth dresses that she creates.

Zach Dundas of Portland Monthly noted her "mash-ups of mass-market and Crow culture make perfect sense...Red Star is enjoying a moment in the wider art world. New York's Metropolitan Museum of Art includes her work in a current exhibit of Plains Indian art, and Dartmouth College's Hood Museum is showing her self-portraiture alongside big names like Chuck Close, Cindy Sherman, and Bruce Nauman. Red Star will stage 15 separate exhibitions this year."

According to the description of her APEX exhibit at the Portland Art Museum, her early work "employed gender-focused, political self-imagery...to draw attention to the marginalization of Native Americans." Norman Denizen observed, "Wendy Red Star, Crow Indian cultural activist and performance artist, offers an alternative view, focusing on performances and artworks that contest the images of the vanishing dark-skinned Indian." Her work has been collected at institutions such as the National Museum of the American Indian, the Minneapolis Institute of Arts, and Eiteljorg Museum of American Indians and Western Art.

=== Advocacy ===
Red Star has advocated for improved opportunities for Native women in the art world. In 2014, she curated Wendy Red Star's Wild West & Congress of Rough Riders of the World, "the first-ever all-Native contemporary art exhibition at Bumbershoot", which took place in Seattle during the annual musical concert. There were 10 artists that exhibited, and most of them were Native artists that primarily worked with identity-based artworks. In 2017, Red Star curated an exhibition at the Missoula Art Museum called Our Side, which featured four contemporary Indigenous female artists: Elisa Harkins, Tanya Lukin Linklater, Marianne Nicolson, and Tanis S'eiltin.

Red Star's advocacy also extends to the concept of indigenous futurism and for the sovereign. She speaks out against colonialism, but there is a sense of speaking in existence in her own right. Her art is tool for resistance as well as an expression to her existence. Her multi-generation collaborations and collaborations with indigenous artists is evident of Red Star's efforts to amplify nuance within indigenous representation.

== Works and publications ==
=== Thunder Up Above ===
For Walks in the Dark of the Thunder Up Above series, she created a costume with European and Victorian motifs in a Native American design, and photoshopped an interplanetary background. Dundas observes, "The sci-fi results evoke the intrigue and suspicion of first contact with an unknown people—or, as she put it in her artist's statement, 'someone you would not want to mess with'."

=== Four Seasons ===
Four Seasons: Winter (2006) at the Smithsonian American Art Museum in 2023

For Red Star's Four Seasons series, the Metropolitan Museum of Art catalog noted, "In this four-part photographic work, Wendy Red Star pokes fun at romantic idealizations of American Indians as 'one with nature.' " Luella Brien of the Native Peoples Magazine wrote the Four Seasons series had an avant-garde quality, with traditional "Native American imagery juxtaposed against authentic imagery". Red Star also uses humor to draw viewers into her work. Blake Gopnik of Artnet News commented, "Posing amid blow-up deer, cut-out coyotes and wallpaper mountains, Red Star uses her series to go after the standard blather about Native American's inevitable 'oneness' with nature." The Saint Louis Art Museum acquired Four Seasons as part of its permanent collection, describing it as among "some of the amazing works of art acquired by the Art Museum in 2014".

=== White Squaw ===
Red Star characterizes her work as research-based, especially as she investigates and explores clichéd Hollywood images like beautiful maidens or western landscapes. While conducting research on the term squaw, she found a reference to White Squaw, a 1950s movie, and later books with pulp-fiction style covers, published as recently as 1997. Red Star took photographic prints of the covers, substituting her own image in a cheap costume for the character "White Squaw", using all the original taglines, with comical satiric effect.

=== 1880 Crow Peace Delegation ===
1880 Crow Peace Delegation: Peelatchixaaliash/Old Crow (Raven) (2014) at the Portland Art Museum

In 1880, six Crow chiefs traveled to Washington, D.C. to talk with the president because the settlers were about to build a railroad through their hunting territory. She researched Medicine Crow/Peelatchiwaaxpáash (Raven) for her exhibit of the Crow Peace Delegation to Washington in 1880 and discovered the narratives behind elements of the iconic picture. She used a red pen on a print of this famous image to notate his outfit and the symbolism attached to elements such as his ermine shawl, the bows in his hair, and the eagle fan he is holding. Red Star said she wanted to use the details of his clothing, and the ledger drawings he made upon his return to the reservation, to humanize Medicine Crow. What she learns in research emerges in her creative process, which she articulates with visual means.

=== Circling the Camp ===
Red Star took photographs at the Crow Fair - a large annual event in Central Montana that happens every third week of August. In an effort to focus on the culture and history of the Crow nation, she removed the background of the pictures to bring attention to the Indigenous people and objects in the foreground.

=== Apsáalooke Feminist ===
Most photographs of Crow women are colorless, so Wendy Red Star took photographs of herself and her daughter Beatrice with colorful Crow clothes to showcase Crow people's everyday fashion. The patterned background is photoshopped to give the images a visual punch.

=== My Home is Where My Tipi Sits ===
This series of color photographs consists of grids of idiosyncratic, typological elements of life on Crow reservations: government houses, broken down "rez" cars, sweat lodges, signs and churches. The works reference the photographs of German photographers Bernd and Hilla Becher, which inventory industrial buildings and water towers, arranged in grids to create "families of objects."

=== Let Them Have Their Voice ===
This multimedia installation was made in response to the work of Edward S. Curtis in his 1908 multi-volume book The North American Indian. Red Star altered Curtis' portraits and made the Native subjects voids in the frames, reducing them to anonymous silhouettes. The sitters are made present through a sound installation. Wax cylinder recording of Crow singers performing traditional songs which Curtis recorded between 1907 and 1912. .

=== Wendy Red Star: A Scratch on the Earth ===
The Soil You See... (2023) on the National Mall

This catalogue was published to coincide with the mid-career survey exhibition by the same name. The exhibition was organized by the Newark Museum of Art and shown from February 23-June 16, 2019. This is currently the most comprehensive publication on Red Star and her work.

=== Travels Pretty ===
In 2023 the Public Art Fund organized Travels Pretty, a public art exhibition of a series of paintings reproduced on bus stops in New York, Chicago, and Boston.

=== The Soil You See... ===
In 2023, Red Star was one of six artists commissioned to create a temporary installation for the National Mall in conjunction with Beyond Granite: Pulling Together, the first curated art exhibition in the Mall's history. Commissioned by the Trust for the National Mall, National Capital Planning Commission, and National Park Service, Red Star designed a memorial to the Apsáalooke leaders who had signed - or been made to sign - treaties with the United States. The sculpture, a red glass representation of the artist's fingerprint, embedded in a granite boulder, featured the names of Apsáalooke leaders who had signed treaties and was sited directly next to the Memorial to the 56 Signers of the Declaration of Independence in Constitution Gardens.

== Collaborations ==
In 2013, Red Star began collaborating with her daughter Beatrice Red Star Fletcher, who "figures prominently in her work" and participates as a tour guide for their exhibitions. Their collaborations have been shown at the Tacoma Art Museum, the Seattle Art Museum, and twice at the Portland Art Museum.

In 2022, Red Star collaborated with Stanford University. Wendy Red Star: American Progress is about her experience as an Apsaalooke artist, addressing her lived experiences with belonging and unbelonging in the United States. Red Star engaged with Stanford students affiliated with the Center for Comparative Studies in Race and Ethnicity as well as the Institute for Diversity in the Arts by researching and gathering materials for the artworks. One of the artworks is entitled, Lady Columbia, and it is a “wallpaper print based on original paint-by-numbers”. The collaboration created a free public program that amplifies the artist's voice and story. This is an example of efforts made by Red Star to create public art and space to get people across communities and generations to interact with indigenous stories.

== Notable works in public collections ==
- Four Seasons: Summer, Fall, Winter, Spring (2006), Albuquerque Museum of Art and History, Albuquerque, New Mexico; Allentown Art Museum, Allentown, Pennsylvania; Asheville Art Museum, Asheville, North Carolina; Boise Art Museum, Boise, Idaho; Des Moines Art Center, Des Moines, Iowa; Hood Museum of Art, Dartmouth College, Hanover, New Hampshire; Jordan Schnitzer Museum of Art, University of Oregon, Eugene, Oregon; Minneapolis Institute of Art; National Museum of the American Indian, Smithsonian Institution, Washington, D.C.; Nelson-Atkins Museum of Art, Kansas City, Missouri; Nerman Museum of Contemporary Art, Johnson County Community College, Overland Park, Kansas; New Mexico State University Art Museum, Las Cruces, New Mexico; Portland Art Museum, Portland, Oregon; Saint Louis Art Museum; San Francisco Museum of Modern Art; Seattle Art Museum; Tacoma Art Museum, Tacoma, Washington; Tang Teaching Museum, Skidmore College, Saratoga Springs, New York; Virginia Museum of Fine Arts, Richmond, Virginia; and Art Museum of West Virginia University, Morgantown, West Virginia
- The Last Thanks (2006), Beach Museum of Art, Kansas State University, Manhattan, Kansas; Kruizenga Art Museum, Hope College, Holland, Michigan; Museum of Contemporary Art, Chicago; Philbrook Museum of Art, Tulsa, Oklahoma; and University of San Diego Galleries
- Fancy Shawl Project series (2009), Eiteljorg Museum, Indianapolis
- enit (2010), Gorman Museum of Native American Art, University of California, Davis; and Hallie Ford Museum of Art, Willamette University, Salem, Oregon
- The (HUD) (2010), Gorman Museum of Native American Art, University of California, Davis; Hallie Ford Museum of Art, Willamette University, Salem, Oregon; and Library of Congress, Washington, D.C.
- My Home Is Where My Tipi Sits series (2011), Solomon R. Guggenheim Museum, New York
- Hoop in the Cloud, from the series Thunder Up Above (2011), Minnesota Museum of American Art, Saint Paul, Minnesota
- Sits With The Stars, from the series Thunder Up Above (2011), Portland Art Museum, Portland, Oregon
- Stands To The Sun, from the series Thunder Up Above (2011), Portland Art Museum, Portland, Oregon
- Walks In The Dark, from the series Thunder Up Above (2011), Minneapolis Institute of Art
- Nine Crow Clowns (2012), Nelson-Atkins Museum of Art, Kansas City, Missouri
- síkahpoyíí / bishée / baleiíttaashtee (Motor Oil Buffalo Dress) (2013), Portland Art Museum, Portland, Oregon
- 1880 Crow Peace Delegation series (2014), Baltimore Museum of Art; Birmingham Museum of Art, Birmingham, Alabama; Brooklyn Museum, New York; Metropolitan Museum of Art, New York; Nasher Museum of Art, Duke University, Durham, North Carolina; Portland Art Museum, Portland, Oregon; and Whitney Museum, New York
- Accession series (2015), Amon Carter Museum of American Art, Fort Worth, Texas; British Museum, London; Museum of Modern Art, New York; Rockwell Museum, Corning, New York; Smithsonian American Art Museum, Smithsonian Institution, Washington, D.C.; and Wellin Museum of Art, Hamilton College, Clinton, New York
- Apsáalooke Roses (2015), Eiteljorg Museum, Indianapolis; Hallie Ford Museum of Art, Willamette University, Salem, Oregon; Museum of Fine Arts, Houston; and Portland Art Museum, Portland, Oregon
- iilaalée = car (goes by itself) + ii = by means of which + dáanniili = we parade (2015–2016), Eiteljorg Museum, Indianapolis; Hallie Ford Museum of Art, Willamette University, Salem, Oregon; and Museum of Fine Arts, Houston
- Yakima or Yakama - Not For Me To Say (2015–2016), Eiteljorg Museum, Indianapolis; Hallie Ford Museum of Art, Willamette University, Salem, Oregon; and Museum of Fine Arts, Boston
- Apsáalooke Feminist #1 (2016), Crocker Art Museum, Sacramento, California
- Apsáalooke Feminist #2 (2016), Weisman Art Museum, University of Minnesota, Minneapolis
- Apsáalooke Feminist #3 (2016), Library of Congress, Washington, D.C.
- Crow Masquerade Dance (2016), Nelson-Atkins Museum of Art, Kansas City, Missouri
- Light Blue Rez House on Peach Background, from the series Reservation Pop (2017), Saint Louis Art Museum
- Silver Rez Car on Electric Blue Background, from the series Reservation Pop (2017), Saint Louis Art Museum
- Pendleton Suit 4 (2018), Crystal Bridges Museum of American Art, Bentonville, Arkansas
- Dust (2020), Chazen Museum of Art, University of Wisconsin–Madison; and Hallie Ford Museum of Art, Willamette University, Salem, Oregon
- Four Generations (2020), Chazen Museum of Art, University of Wisconsin–Madison; Hallie Ford Museum of Art, Willamette University, Salem, Oregon; and Museum of Fine Arts, Boston
- Her Dreams Are True (Julia Bad Boy) (2020), Chazen Museum of Art, University of Wisconsin–Madison; Hallie Ford Museum of Art, Willamette University, Salem, Oregon; Library of Congress, Washington, D.C.; and Museum of Contemporary Photography, Columbia College Chicago
- Amnía (Echo) (2021), San Antonio Museum of Art
- Bi’ nneete (No Water) (2021), Memorial Art Gallery, University of Rochester, Rochester, New York
- The Indian Congress (2021), Joslyn Art Museum, Omaha, Nebraska
- Áakiiwilaxpaake (People of the Earth) (2022), Seattle Art Museum
- The Soil You See... (2023), Tippet Rise Art Center, Fishtail, Montana

== Selected exhibitions ==
Red Star has been actively exhibiting her work since 2003. Exhibitions since 2011 include:

- Parading Culture (Tokens, Gold and Glory) Haw Contemporary Fine Art Gallery, Kansas City, Missouri (2016)
- The Plains Indian: Artists of Earth and Sky: Metropolitan Museum of Art (2015)
- Peelatchiwaaxpáash/Medicine Crow (Raven) & the 1880 Crow Peace Delegation: APEX gallery, Portland Art Museum (2015)
- Tableaux Vivant: Nature's Playground. Seattle Art Fair – Volunteer Park. Seattle, Washington (2015)
- Circling the Camp: Wendy Red Star: Indianapolis Museum of Contemporary Art (2014)
- Crow Women's Objects. Saint Louis Art Museum, St. Louis, Missouri. (2014)
- Wendy Red Star: C.N. Gorman Museum (2014)
- I.M.N.D.N. — Native Art for the 21st Century: The Art Gym, Marylhurst University (2014)
- Contemporary American Indian Art: Nerman Museum of Contemporary Art (2014)
- Making Marks: Prints From Crow's Shadow Press: National Museum of the American Indian (2014)
- Cross Currents: Metropolitan State, University of Denver (2013–2014)
- Biennial Contemporary American Indian Arts Series: Native Voices and Identity Narratives: The A.D. Gallery (2013)
- My Home Is Where My Tipi Sits (Crow Country): Missoula Art Museum (2011)
- American Spirit: Bockley Gallery (2011)
- Wendy Red Star: A Scratch on the Earth. The Newark Museum of Art (2019)
- Indelible Ink: Native Women, Printmaking, Collaboration. University of New Mexico Art Museum. (2020)
- Wendy Red Star: Apsáalooke: Children of the Large-Beaked Bird, MASS MoCA, North Adams, MA (2020–2021)

== Fellowships and grants ==
- 2024 MacArthur Fellowship
- Joan Mitchell Foundation Emerging Artist Fellowship
- Eiteljorg Contemporary Art Fellowship
- 2017 Louis Comfort Tiffany Foundation

== See also ==
- Native American women in the arts
- Visual arts by indigenous peoples of the Americas
- Indigenous Futurism
