= Vanessa german =

American artist

vanessa german
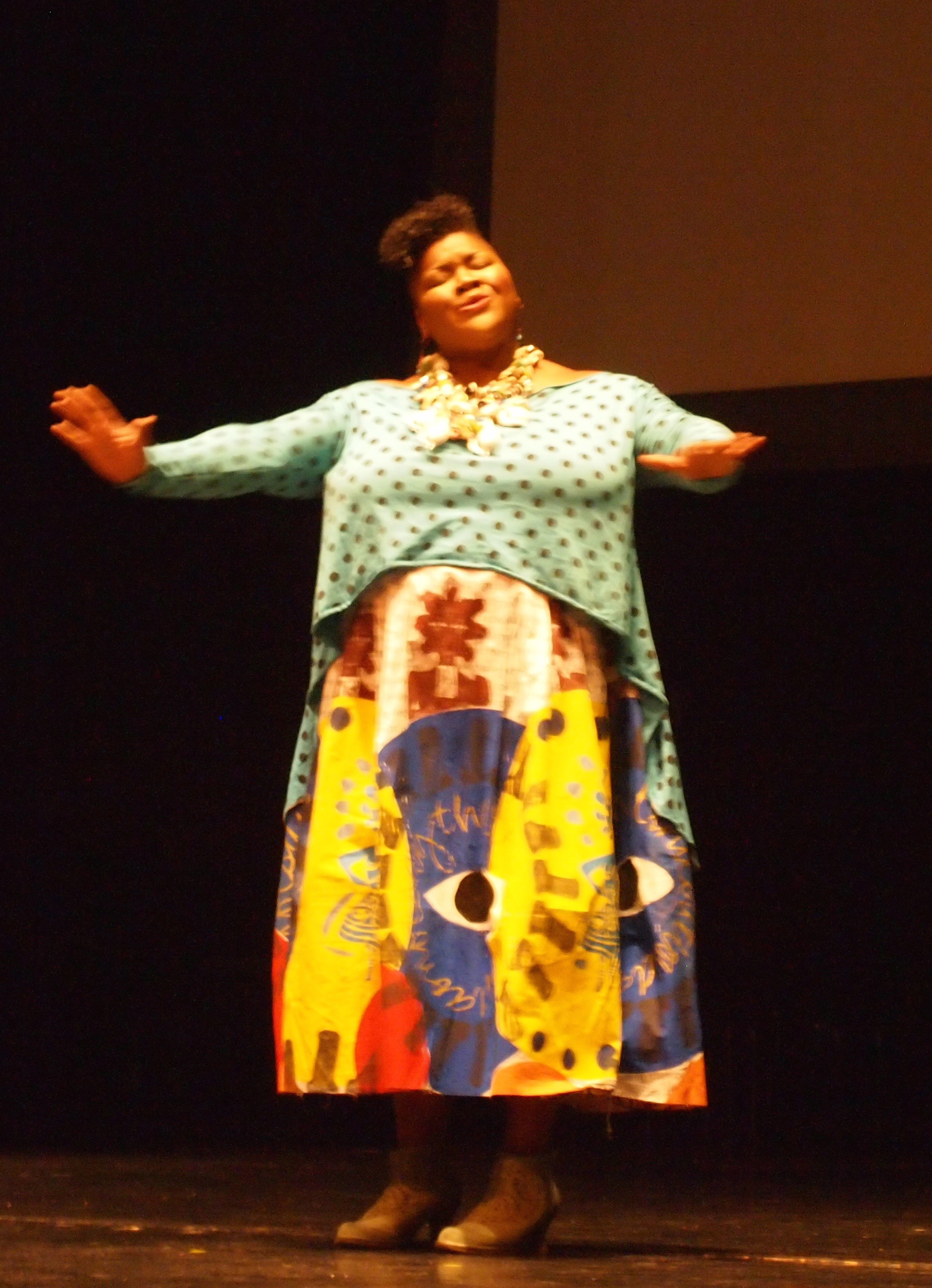
- vanessa german on stage
- Born: 1976 (age 49–50); Milwaukee, Wisconsin, U.S.
- Known for: Sculpture

vanessa german (stylized in all lowercase) (born 1976) is an American sculptor, painter, writer, activist, performer, and poet based in Pittsburgh, Pennsylvania.

Her sculpture often includes assembled statues of female figures with their faces or heads painted black, and a wide range of attached objects, including fabric, keys, found objects, and toy weapons. german is an activist, addressing problems like gun violence and prostitution.

Her work is held in numerous permanent collections, including the Frederick R. Weisman Art Foundation, the Nelson-Atkins Museum of Art, and the Crystal Bridges Museum of American Art; and has been reviewed by Sculpture and discussed in The New York Times, O, The Oprah Magazine, and on NPR's All Things Considered. Her art has been featured in a wide range of galleries, museums and traveling exhibits, including the 2012 "African American Art 1950–present" touring exhibit from the Smithsonian Institution. She was a 2015 recipient of the Louis Comfort Tiffany Foundation Biennial Grant. She was the winner of the 2018 Don Tyson Prize, a biannual $200,000 award from the Crystal Bridges Museum of American Art.

== Early life ==
vanessa german was born in Milwaukee, Wisconsin and raised in the Mid-City area of Los Angeles and Loveland, Ohio by her mother, Sandra Keat German (1949–2014), a fiber artist, quilter and costume maker. She is the third of five children. She moved to Pittsburgh, Pennsylvania in 2000 and began to perform and exhibit her work locally. She describes her work as heavily influenced by her childhood in Los Angeles, where her mother encouraged the children to make their own clothes, and she was also impacted by the AIDS epidemic and drive-by shootings.

== Artistic career ==
A self-taught artist, much of german's artwork is collage and sculpted assemblages. german's sculptural work frequently includes female figures that she calls "power figures" and "tar babies". She creates them by decorating and painting large dolls and figures, then sculpting outward by adding a wide range of materials including objects like cowrie shells, plastic guns, feathers, bottle caps, seashells, toys, and vintage products. She often uses found and donated materials from her Homewood neighborhood. She discovered that her work included elements similar to the central African tradition of Nkisi nkondi, guardian statues pierced with nails and other materials.

Her materials lists for artworks are often poems in themselves. They may include both the physical (e.g. cloth, paint, keys) and non-tangible materials (e.g. "the names of all the dead boys that I know," "tears"). Recurring themes addressed in her work include food, birds, violence, injustice, poverty, and Black Madonna imagery. In her artist statement for 2016's dontsaythatshitoutloud, she describes the impact of finding two men murdered outside her house within a four-month period.

Her work includes the symbolic use of color throughout. Describing beads from one work, she said "If they're red, they're holding rage and love simultaneously. If they're white – they're holding ghosts – the presence of your ancestors ...and they're also holding forgiveness and peace."

Of Thee We Sing (2023) at the Lincoln Memorial in 2023

In 2023, german was one of six artists commissioned to create a temporary installation for the National Mall in conjunction with Beyond Granite: Pulling Together, the first curated art exhibition in the Mall's history. Commissioned by the Trust for the National Mall, National Capital Planning Commission, and National Park Service, german created an assemblage sculpture of African-American singer Marian Anderson for the plaza of the Lincoln Memorial. german's sculpture Of Thee We Sing (2023) memorialized Anderson's performance in the plaza from 1939, hosted after Anderson was denied permission to perform in the segregated DAR Constitution Hall several months prior.

german, like the author bell hooks, stylizes her name in all lowercase. In 2023, she told The Bergen Record that this decision was "a way I level myself without hierarchy."

== ARThouse and Love Front Porch ==
german also led the ARThouse and Love Front Porch, a community art institution, in the Homewood neighborhood of Pittsburgh, PA. She started the ARThouse when she needed to start creating artworks on her front porch because her basement ceiling was too low: her large sculptural pieces had to be taken apart to be removed from the basement. After she started working on the porch, ARTHouse was born. Neighborhood children began gathering to watch her work. This expanded into a dedicated community art space, which moved twice before moving into its permanent location, a house purchased with donations and proceeds from her art sales, dedicated in December 2015. In 2012, Love Front Porch received a $4,000 grant from the Sankofa Fund of Southwest Pennsylvania, which highlights empowering grass-roots African-American community projects.

german also ran the Tuesday Night Monologue Project at ARThouse, a weekly event where guest artists and members of the community could write and share works with each other.

Homewood was described as "The Most Dangerous Neighborhood in America" by MSNBC journalist, Rachel Maddow. german has said about Homewood, "...that doesn't happen every day. It doesn't happen every week. Most people aren't shooting each other. Most people are not running drugs. It's a very small percentage of the population who are engaging in really extreme activities."

The ARThouse suffered severe damage from a fire in 2021 and was closed to the public. german fundraised to renovate the space but decided to leave Homewood herself and moved to North Carolina, describing the impact of living in a community with significant violence by saying "It became impossible to work there because I was scared so much of the time."

== Collections ==
german's work is held in the following permanent collections:

- Art Museum of West Virginia University
- Crystal Bridges Museum of American Art, AR.
- American Visionary Art Museum. Baltimore, MD.
- The Progressive Art Collection, Cleveland, OH
- David C. Driskell Center for the Study of the Visual Arts and Culture of African Americans and the African Diaspora, College Park, MD
- Franciscan University, Steubenville, OH
- Frederick R. Weisman Art Foundation, Los Angeles, CA
- IP Stanback Museum, South Carolina State University, Orangeburg, SC
- The Wadsworth Atheneum Museum of Art, Hartford, CT
- Spelman College Museum of Fine Art, Atlanta, GA
- The Nelson-Atkins Museum of Art, Kansas City, MO
- The Westmoreland Museum of American Art, Greensburg, PA
- The Mount Holyoke College Art Museum, South Hadley, MA
- The Newark Museum
- Senator John Heinz History Center, Pittsburgh, PA

== Notable exhibitions ==
- 2012: African American Art 1950–present, Smithsonian Institution and David C. Driskell Center, College Park, MD
- 2012: Pavel Zoubok Gallery New York, NY.
- 2013: "Homewood". Pavel Zoubok Gallery. New York, NY.
- 2013– 2014: "Under the Influence of Finance – Fashion; Selections from the Frederick R. Weisman Art Foundation" Carnegie Art Museum, Oxnard, CA.
- 2014: Pittsburgh Biennial. Pittsburgh, PA.
- 2015: "Re: Purposed". The Ringling Museum. Sarasota, FL.
- 2015: "Vanessa German: Bitter Root". Holter Museum of Art. Helena, MT.
- 2015: "Vanessa German: The Ordinary Sacred". Concept Art Gallery. Pittsburgh, PA.
- 2016: "Africa Forecast: Fashioning Contemporary Life". Spelman College Museum of Fine Art. Atlanta, GA.
- 2016: "i am armed. i am an army." Pavel Zoubok Gallery. New York, NY.
- 2016: "i come to do violence to the lie". Solo Exhibit. Matrix new work series. The Amistad Center for Art & Culture, Wadsworth Atheneum Museum of Art. Hartford, CT.
- 2016: "Introspective". August Wilson Center for African American Culture. Pittsburgh, PA.
- 2017: "de.structive dis.tallation" Everson Museum of Art. Syracuse, NY.
- 2017: State of The Art: Discovering American Art Now, touring exhibit developed by Crystal Bridges Museum of American Art, Arkansas.
- 2017: "sometimes. we. cannot. be. with. our. bodies." Mattress Factory. Pittsburgh, PA.
- 2019: "Vanessa German: Miracles And Glory Abound" Flint Institute of Arts. Flint, MI.
- 2021: "Reckoning: Grief and Light." The Frick Pittsburgh. Pittsburgh, PA.
- 2022–2023: vanessa german—THE RAREST BLACK WOMAN ON THE PLANET EARTH, Mount Holyoke College Art Museum, South Hadley, MA.

== Documentary ==
"Tar Baby Jane". Filmmaker Gregory Scott Williams, Jr., 2010.

== Selected reviews ==
"Vanessa German." Sculpture magazine. July/ August 2012.

"Cut-and-Paste Culture: The New Collage". ARTnews. December 12. 2013.

"Exhibition Review: Unloaded." afterimage: The Journal of Media Arts and Cultural Criticism. May 22, 2015.

"i take my soul with me everywhere i go". The Georgia Review, September 13, 2016.

"Review: "Africa Forecast" shows how convention inspires Black women's spirit". ArtsATL, November 11, 2016.

== Notable appearances ==
- "The City is Ours Today" (poem). Inauguration of Pittsburgh mayor, Bill Peduto. January 2014.
- "Root" (performed and written spoken word opera) Martha's Vineyard Playhouse, 2011.
- Performance poem. Fashion Africana (2004), Carnegie Museum of Pittsburgh Music Hall.

== Awards ==
- 27th Annual Heinz Award for the Arts, 2022
- Jacob Lawrence Award, The American Academy of Arts and Letters, 2017.
- Louis Comfort Tiffany Foundation Biennial Grant, 2015.
- Ronald H. Brown Community Leadership award, Urban League of Greater Pittsburgh, 2014.
- Emerging Artist of the Year, Pittsburgh Center for the Arts, 2012.
- Duquesne Light Leadership Award: Arts, Culture, Recreation, 2007. (honoring German's spoken word poetry).
