= Will Hermes =

American author, broadcaster, and music critic (born 1960)

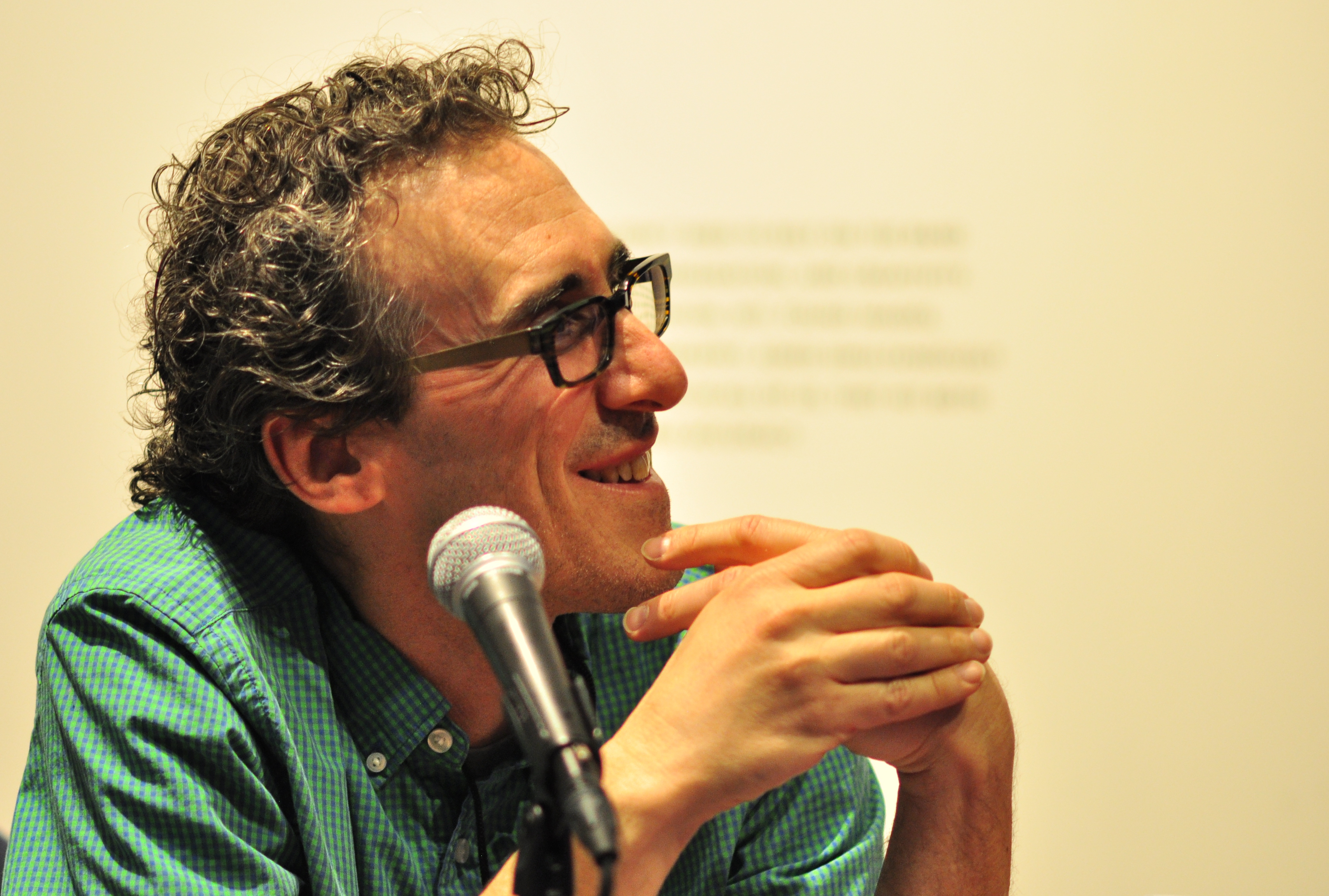
- Hermes at the 2015 EMP Pop Conference
- Born: December 27, 1960 (age 65); New York City, U.S.
- Education: SUNY Oswego; SUNY Binghamton; Queens College, CUNY; University of Minnesota
- Occupations: Author; broadcaster; journalist; critic
- Notable work: Love Goes To Buildings On Fire (2011); Lou Reed: The King of New York (2023)
- Website: willhermes.com

Will Hermes (born December 27, 1960) is an American author, broadcaster, journalist and critic who has written extensively about popular music. He is a long-time contributor to Rolling Stone and to National Public Radio's All Things Considered. His work has also appeared in Pitchfork, Spin, The New York Times, The Village Voice, The Believer, GQ, Salon, Entertainment Weekly, Details, City Pages, The Windy City Times, and Option.

Hermes is the author of Love Goes to Buildings on Fire: Five Years in New York That Changed Music Forever (2011), a history of the New York City music scene in the 1970s; and Lou Reed: The King of New York, a biography.

== Biography ==
Hermes was born in Jamaica, Queens, New York City. He transferred from SUNY Oswego to SUNY Binghamton in 1979, graduating in 1983 with a BA in rhetoric and communication. He later earned a master's degree in education from Queens College, CUNY, and a master's degree in creative writing from the University of Minnesota.

In the late 1980s, Hermes began writing for Option, a Los Angeles–based small-press magazine that covered a wide range of music. In 1993, he became the Arts & Music Editor for City Pages, an alternative newsweekly based in Minneapolis. In 1997, he was hired as a Senior Editor for Spin magazine in New York City. Hermes began contributing regularly to Rolling Stone in the '00s and became a frequent voice in the magazine's review section. He co-edited SPIN: 20 Years of Alternative Music, an anthology of writing from Spin magazine, published in 2006, with Sia Michel, then the magazine's editor-in-chief. His writing was included in Da Capo's Best Music Writing 2006 and Best Music Writing 2007.

In 2011, Farrar, Straus and Giroux/Faber and Faber published his book Love Goes To Buildings On Fire: Five Years in New York That Changed Music Forever, a history of New York City music culture in the 1970s, covering the nascent punk rock, hip hop and disco scenes, along with salsa, loft jazz, and the downtown composers known as minimalists. It was selected as the top music book of 2011 by NPR, and it was an Editor's Choice title in The New York Times Book Review, which called it a "prodigious work of contemporary music history".

Lou Reed: The King of New York, was published by Farrar, Straus and Giroux/Viking in 2023. It was named among the best non-fiction books of 2023 by Kirkus Reviews, and one of the best music books of 2023 by Rolling Stone, Pitchfork, Variety, and Uncut. Writing in The Washington Post, Stephen Metcalf said that the book "is as beautifully researched as it is written; thorough, smart, conscientious and an absolute delight to simmer in". Writing for Bookforum, Hanif Abdurraqib called it "A work of grand affection, one that allows a person their failings, and one that knows that examining those failings alongside the grandest achievements is how one pays homage to a full life." Writing for Literary Review, David Keenan said: "An awkward love letter to the 20th century with added apologia, The King of New York is the perfect biography of Lou Reed for 2023, and will likely remain that way".

== Bibliography ==
=== Books ===
- Hermes, Will; Michel, Sia, eds. (2005). Spin : 20 years of alternative music : original writing on rock, hip-hop, techno, and beyond. New York: Three Rivers Press. ISBN 9780307236623.
- Love Goes To Buildings On Fire: Five Years in New York That Changed Music Forever. Farrar, Straus and Giroux/Faber and Faber, 2011. ISBN 978-0-86547-980-7
- Hermes, Will (2023). Lou Reed The King of New York. New York: Farrar, Straus and Giroux. ISBN 9780374193393

=== Essays and reporting ===
- "Natalie Prass". The Future is Now. Rolling Stone (Australia). 762: 47. May 2015.
- "Review: The Highwomen Write Their Own History on Superb Debut", Rolling Stone, August 29, 2019.
- "Sunday Review: King Sunny Adé: Juju Music", Pitchfork, December 12, 2021.
- "What's Driving A Fresh Wave of Irish Music? Tradition", The New York Times, March 25, 2023.
- "The Year Lou Reed Gave Up On Music", The New York Times, September 22, 2023.
