= Marisa Williamson =

American artist (born 1985)

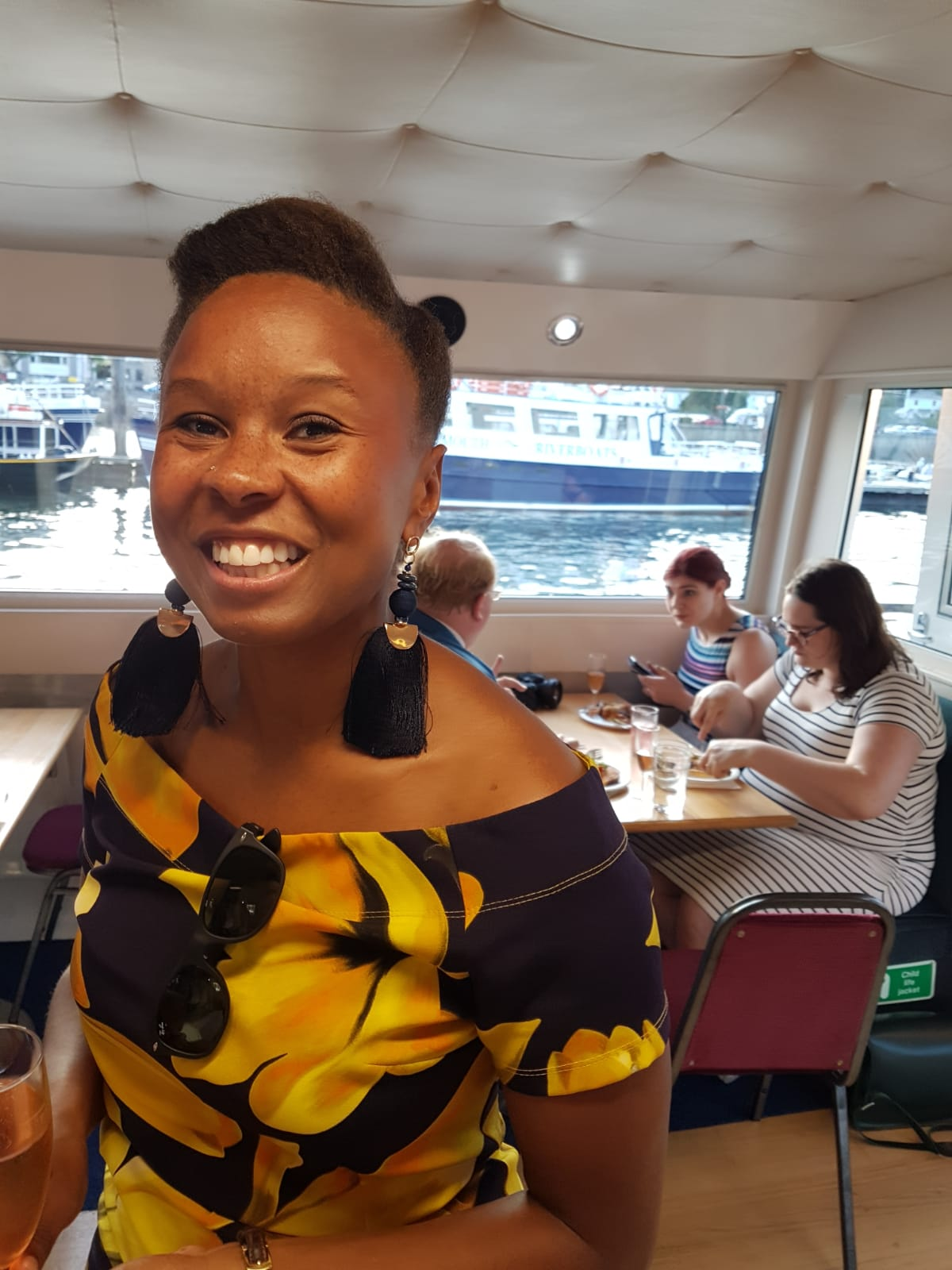
- Born: 1985 (age 40–41)
- Education: CalArts, Skowhegan, Harvard University
- Website: http://www.marisawilliamson.com/

Marisa Williamson (born 1985) is an East Coast-based American artist who works in video and performance around themes of history, race, feminism, and technology. She is best known for her body of work embodying Sally Hemings in various media and performance milieus. Williamson is a graduate of CalArts (MFA 2013), Skowhegan School of Painting and Sculpture (2012), and Harvard University (BA 2008). She is currently an assistant professor at the University of Virginia in the College and Graduate School of Arts and Sciences.

== Work ==
Williamson’s work revolves around questions of the African-American experience, female representation, and historical narratives. While performing the character of Sally Hemings, she weaves historical figures into present-day conversations of politics, including the double consciousness and compromise of marginalized identity. Many of her performances involve props and built environments, such as her 2017 solo show ("SUB") and performance ("FLIGHT") at Soho20 Gallery, for which Williamson constructed a living room set. Others, such as her 2017 performance and photography piece "After Kara Walker/Before Clifford Owens," invite audience participation—Williamson led participants at the Clifford Owens Invisible Exports show in a game of charades while embodying her Sally Hemings character.

Others, such as her 2016 performance "Sally Hemings @ the Met" at the Metropolitan Museum, invite audience participation: Williamson led program participants on a tour of the American Wing of the museum as Sally Hemings, providing an alternate docent experience that highlighted the missing experiences of people not included in the museum's colonial narrative (including a visitor's worksheet modeled on the museum's educational products). Williamson's 2017 performance piece "Sweet Chariot" for Philadelphia's Monument Lab created the parafictional protagonist Amelia Brown, who led visitors through Philadelphia using an image-recognition smartphone app to cue videos about Brown's journey toward freedom. A scratch-off map, referencing both historical reenactments and walking tours, guided participants through Philadelphia.

== Exhibitions ==
2020

The Runaway, SOIL and Jacob Lawrence Gallery, Seattle

2017

Sweet Chariot: The Long Journey to Freedom Through Time, Monument Lab, Philadelphia

SUB, Soho20 Gallery, Brooklyn

2016

Sally Hemings @ the Met, Metropolitan Museum, New York

== Awards and Scholarships ==
Triangle Arts Association Fall Residency, 2016

Shandaken Project Residency, Summer 2015

ACRE Residency, 2014
