= Derrick Adams =

American visual artist

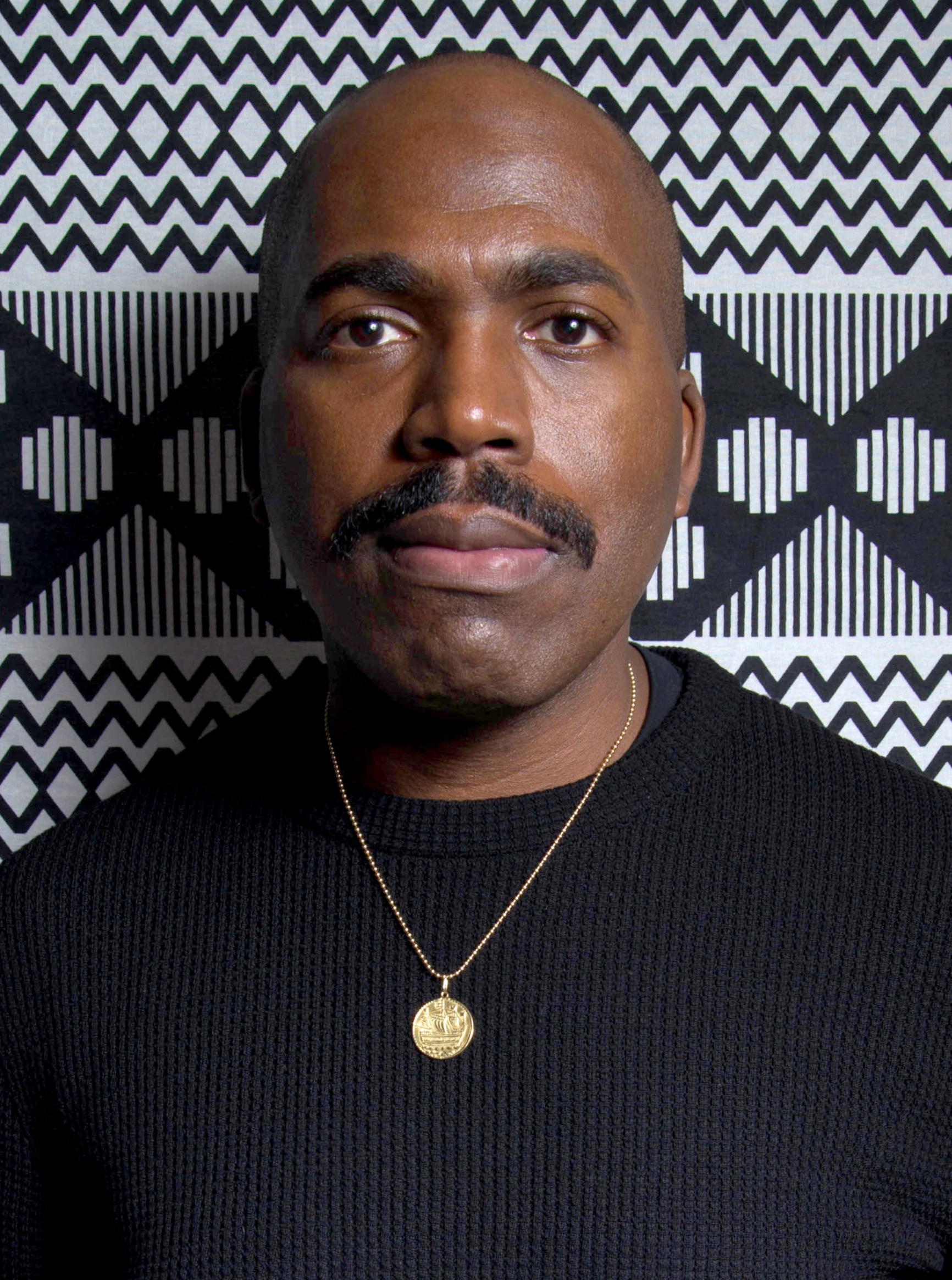
- Adams in 2019
- Born: 1970 (age 55–56); Baltimore, Maryland
- Education: Pratt Institute; Columbia University
- Awards: Louis Comfort Tiffany Award, Joyce Alexander Wein Artist Prize,
- Website: http://www.derrickadams.com/

Derrick Adams (born 1970) is an American visual and performance artist and curator. Much of Adams' work is centered around his Black identity, frequently referencing patterns, images, and themes of Black culture in America, with a focus on what critics have referred to as "Black Joy". Adams has additionally worked as a fine art professor, serving as a faculty member at Maryland Institute College of Art. Adams is represented by Gagosian Gallery. He is a graduate of the Pratt Institute and Columbia University.

== Early life and education ==
Derrick Adams was born in 1970 in Baltimore, Maryland. After briefly teaching elementary school, Adams attended the Pratt Institute. Following his 1996 graduation, Adams earned his MFA from Columbia University, completing his degree in 2003.

== Career ==
In 2016, Adams created an installation (titled Derrick Adams: THE HOLDOUT — A Social Sculpture with Curated Music Program) for the Aljira Center for Contemporary Art in Newark, NJ, that featured a large pyramid enclosing a broadcasting radio station. According to Adams, the pyramids in his work reference the long presence of Black culture and the cultural capital built by black people over history.

Adams's 2016 show at Pioneer Works explored Black characters in popular culture. Titled Derrick Adams: ON, the exhibition included collages, sculptures, and lampshades that evoked characters from popular movies and TV shows like In Living Color and The Matrix.

The Studio Museum in Harlem mounted Adams's 2017 exhibition Derrick Adams: Patrick Kelley, The Journey, in which the artist created mood boards for a proposed autobiography of the fashion designer Patrick Kelley, whose techniques with formal composition resonated with Adams in terms of the construction of identity.

In 2017, Adams used the archival collections of the Stony Island Arts Bank (along with material from other collections), to create a solo show there, Future People. An installation environment featured a looping video that projected images and quotes from Black authors and speakers. A series of collages in the exhibition, Orbiting Us #1-#10, depicted items designed by Charles Harrison, the first Black executive at Sears, Roebuck and Company. Adams used the exhibition to highlight the productive power of Black people to imagine and innovate through difficult circumstances.

At the Museum of Arts and Design in 2018, Adams showed work inspired by The Negro Motorist Green Book. Titled Sanctuary, Adams's show featured an installation environment structured by a miniaturized highway that ran through the galleries, passing collages that evoked locations listed in the guidebook. Sanctuary celebrated the leisure time and success of African Americans even during the Jim Crow era, partly illuminated by small houses resembling milk cartons.

In 2018, the Museum of Contemporary Art Denver presented a survey of Adams's work spanning 2014-2017, including sculptures, installations, and works on paper. Titled, Derrick Adams: Transmission, the exhibition showcased three bodies of work: "Future People" (2017), "Fabrication Station" (2016), and a series of "Boxhead" sculptures (2014), exploring "Derrick Adams's ongoing study of racial identity as it is both filtered through popular culture and also reimagined for the future."

Derrick Adams was awarded a 2018 Gordon Parks Foundation Fellowship, and participated in a two-person exhibition, American Family: Derrick Adams and Deana Lawson, at the Foundation as part of the award. Adams says about the exhibition, "Parks' influence…goes beyond the visual, into the meaning and purpose of why I feel it's so important to show the many facets of black American life in ways that shed light onto the complexity and richness of our past, present and future."

In 2019, Adams's work was featured in the Fox TV hit Empire. The art work in the series depicts the main characters, Cookie and Lucious Lyon (played by Taraji P. Henson and Terrence Howard), and is part of a real-life limited-edition collection of objects, "Empire x Derrick Adams collection", which supports Turnaround Arts, an arts-based school program at the Kennedy Center. This wasn't the first time his work was showcased on a hit American TV show. In 2017, Issa Rae included his work in her HBO comedy Insecure.

in 2019 Adams was commissioned by the MTA (Metropolitan Transportation Authority) to create laminated glass artwork for the Nostrand Avenue Station. The laminated glass artwork consists of 85-panels that span the length of the newly rehabilitated platforms and extend onto the four new pedestrian bridges that connect the station to the neighborhoods of Crown Heights and Bedford-Stuyvesant that are represented within the artwork. Using areal photos, maps, and personal history. Adams employs his collage style to emphasizes the symbiotic relationship between neighborhood residents and their built environment.

In 2020 Adams created a mural for Harlem Hospital.

In 2023, Adams was one of six artists commissioned to create a temporary installation for the National Mall in conjunction with Beyond Granite: Pulling Together, the first curated art exhibition in the Mall's history. Commissioned by the Trust for the National Mall, National Capital Planning Commission, and National Park Service, Adams designed a fully functional, interactive playground that served as a memorial to the desegregation of public schools in Washington, D.C. The playground was divided in half using a large panel that featured pictures of kids playing on a playground in Washington, immediately after the court decision that desegregated schools; one half of the playground was painted in exclusively shades of gray, while the other half was rendered in bright hues, with an archway in the center connecting the two sides.

In 2024-2025, Adams' work was included in the touring exhibit "Giants: Art from the Dean Collection of Swizz Beatz and Alicia Keys" at the Brooklyn Museum and Minneapolis Institute of Art. Two of his deconstructed collages, “Interior Life (Woman)” and “Interior Life (Man),” appear in the 2025 “Strong, Bright, Useful & True: Recent Acquisitions and Contemporary Art From Baltimore" at the Irene and Richard Frary Gallery at the Johns Hopkins Bloomberg Center in Washington, DC.

From April 16–September 7, 2026, ICA Boston presents Derrick Adams: View Master, his first mid-career museum survey, spanning 20 years of work. A monograph published in fall 2025 surveying Adams' career preceded the exhibition and informed its structure, which centers on three recurring themes in his work: Channeling, Signaling, and Mirroring. Following its Boston run, the exhibition is scheduled to travel to the Queens Museum in New York.
