= Paul Ramirez Jonas =

American artist and arts educator (born 1965)

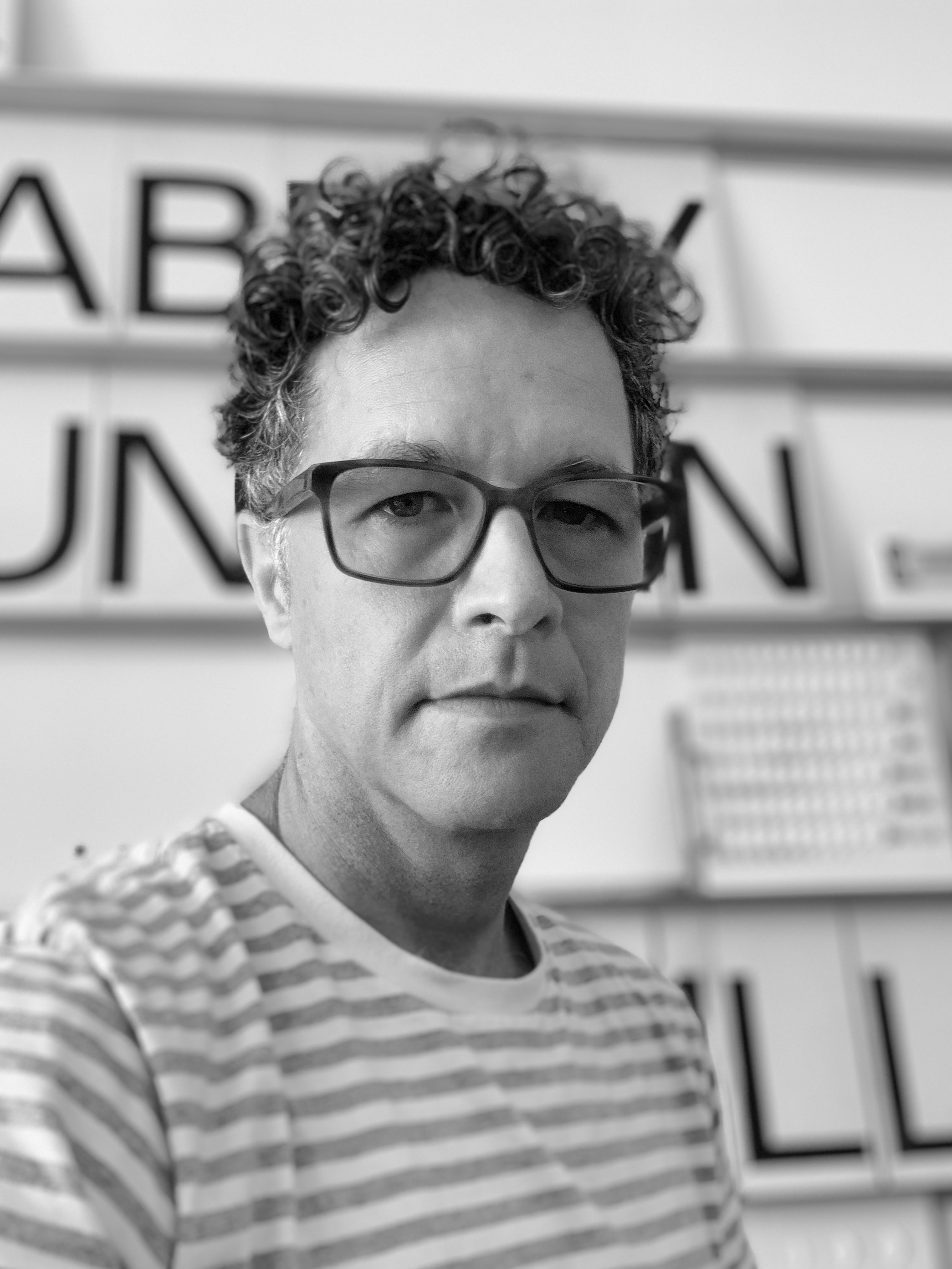
- Born: 1965 (age 60–61); Pomona, California, U.S.
- Education: Brown University, Rhode Island School of Design
- Movement: Social Practice
- Spouse: Deborah Fisher
- Website: paulramirezjonas.com

Paul Ramírez Jonas (born 1965, Pomona, California) is an American artist and arts educator, who is known for his social practice artworks exploring the potential between artist, audience, artwork and public. Many of Ramirez Jonas's projects use pre-existing texts, models, or materials to reenact or prompt actions.

He has participated in the Johannesburg Biennale, the Seoul Biennial, the Shanghai Biennial, the 28th São Paulo Biennial, the 53rd Venice Biennale, and the 7th Bienal do Mercosul, Porto Alegre, Brazil.

== Early life and education ==
Paul Ramírez Jonas was born in 1965 in Pomona, California and raised in Honduras. In 1987, Ramirez Jonas graduated with a B.A. from Brown University, and went on to earn an M.F.A. in painting from the Rhode Island School of Design in 1989.

== Career ==
Shortly after receiving his Master’s Degree, Ramírez Jonas began exhibiting his work in New York in 1990. From the 1990-2004, Ramírez Jonas was primarily known for producing artworks that utilized a wide array of media for display in galleries. For example, he was recognized for a series of sculptures where he recreated historical kite designs for the experiments of Alexander Graham Bell and other inventors. It should be acknowledged that in this period his practice was not limited to only gallery exhibitions but included performance that interacted with audience members. In 1991, in collaboration with fellow artist Spencer Finch, the duo created an alternative audio tour of the Metropolitan Museum of Art, entitled Masterpieces Without the Director. However this format of presentation was an exception and much of his recognition in the 1990s and into the 2000s was in both in commercial and institutional gallery exhibitions. This period would culminate in a survey show in 2004 at Ikon Gallery in Birmingham, UK. This exhibition examined the early works of Ramírez Jonas and his exploration of technological progress as a backdrop to address concepts of time, memory and loss. Despite this emphasis, in the catalogue that accompanied the 2004 Ikon exhibition, editor Sofía Hernández Chong Cuy acknowledges the artist's growing interests in “public space”.

As the 2000s progressed, Ramírez Jonas created public works to intimate drawings, performances and videos. Through his practice, he sought to challenge the definitions of art and the public and to engineer active audience participation and exchange. Ramírez Jonas described his role as "extending beyond the private reader, and into someone who invites viewers to join in. The result of this shift is the reassertion of a contract between the artwork and its public." In addition to conceiving public projects, both permanent (Taylor Square in Cambridge, and Hudson River Park, New York City) and temporary (such as Talisman at 28th Bienal de São Paulo, 2008), Ramírez Jonas was the subject of numerous solo exhibitions. He has participated in the 1st Johannesburg Biennale; the 1st Seoul Biennial; the 6th Shanghai Biennial; the 28th São Paulo Biennial and the 53rd Venice Biennial.

Since 2004, Ramírez Jonas' efforts were increasingly recognized as part of the fields of Social Practice and Socially Engaged Art. This “turn to the social” by many artists consisted of a wide ranging set artistic approaches that embraced art making strategies that were durational, participatory and cross disciplinary and that cultivated links between the aesthetic and political. Ramírez Jonas’ series of works that involved an exchange of keys with the audience had particular import for the field of socially engaged artists and thinkers. These projects were Mi Casa Su Casa produced in San Diego and Tijuana for inSite_05 (2005), Talisman produced in São Paulo for the 28th Bienal de São Paulo (2008) and Key to the City produced in New York City with Creative Time (2010) among others. Notably his work in this period, he distinguished himself by maintaining his position as the author of the work. Whereas other socially engaged artists sought to share or question the role of the author through collaborative production. Although Ramírez Jonas’ work was contingent on the audience enacting the work, he always maintained an investment in the production of art objects as exemplified in his series of projects that circulates keys. In considering these art objects, writer and curator Nato Thompson wrote that the keys, “Recontextualized, they offer opportunities for participants to contemplate a broader range of choices, possibilities, and social interactions.” With Ramírez Jonas’ interest in speech acts, citizenry and audience participation, his works embodied many of the concerns of socially engaged art. His approach described at times as a “MicroUtopia” for its capacity to temporarily engage the audience directly in small but exceptional acts that address large scale societal issues.

In 2003, Jonas presented alongside artist Janine Antoni at Miami Art Museum, former Pérez Art Museum Miami. The exhibition was part of the museum's New Works series, and the duo showcased two of various collaborative projects. Mirror a commissioned work, and Always New, Always Familiar.

In 2017, the Contemporary Arts Museum Houston organized a comprehensive survey of Ramírez Jonas. This exhibition contextualized the gallery based work of the 1990s with the later work of the 2000s. In considering the artist’s evolution over the nearly three decades, the exhibition presented Ramírez Jonas’ oeuvre as possessing a distinct continuity.

== Public Collections (selection) ==
His work is included in various public museum collections including the Pérez Art Museum Miami (PAMM), the Solomon R. Guggenheim Museum, among others.

== Work ==
=== Heavier than Air series (1993–1994) ===
Taking the early prototypes for flying machines as points of departure, Ramírez Jonas built kites that he launched from the beach in reference to the experiments of the Wright Brothers. Each kite was fitted with a timer that, when it went off, photographed the view of the artist below. Like thus, Ramírez Jonas’ early works such as ‘Heavier than Air’ often recreated or reenacted historical moments in both traditional and contemporary media.

=== A Better Yesterday (1999) ===
In 1999, Ramirez Jonas produced a project entitled A Better Yesterday for the exhibition Panorama 2000 organized by the Centraal Museum in Utrecht. This work consisted of painting an analogue clock face on the pavement and buildings of the city center of Utrecht. Since this “clock” spanned a 200 meter diameter of the city center, it could only be viewed in total from the elevation of the Dom Tower, whereas at street level, pedestrians could only view individual numbers. Throughout the day, an attendant, pedaling a tricycle with a musical automaton aboard, would visit each number at the corresponding hour of the day. The mechanics and construction of the automaton was carefully formed to visually combine three references: the Dom Tower in Utrecht, Bruegel’s painted depiction of the Tower of Babel and Tatlin’s Tower. At the top of each hour the musical automaton would play a score that was a mix of the songs It's a Small World (After All) and L'Internationale. The project lasted the length of the exhibition from June 5 - October 3, 1999. The project was part of a large group show of artists making works that utilized the view of the Dom Tower.

=== Talisman (2008) ===
In 2008, Ramírez Jonas produced the work Talisman for the 28th São Paulo Biennial. He arranged for members of the public to a receive a key to the front door of the biennial venue, the Ciccillo Matarazzo Pavilion. Each person who received a key was required to leave behind a copy of one of their own keys as well as sign a contract that established an agreement between themselves, the curators, the artist and the biennial foundation.

=== Publicar Series (2009) ===
In this series of sculptures entitled Publicar, Ramírez Jonas altered large boulders by carving into them a space for monument plaques to be placed. In this carved out space where a bronze plaque would be placed to honor a State figure or event, the artist substituted a cork board that served as a repository for public fleeting messages or personal note- the ephemeral voice of his public. The first three of this series were produced for the 7th Mercosul Biennial in Porto Alegre, Brazil in 2009.

=== Key to the City (2010) ===
In the summer of 2010, Ramírez Jonas created the Key to the City project in New York City with Creative Time and curator Nato Thompson. He replaced 24 locks around the city, so that they could all be opened with a new “key to the city.” Some of the keys opened simple spaces, and other opened complex interactions like participating in a restaurant. Key to the City involved 25,000 participants and centered around a key as a vehicle for exploring social contracts pertaining to trust, access, and belonging. Keys have featured repeatedly in his work as symbols of access and exclusion, public and private ownership. Keys were distributed until June 2010, and the locks remained accessible throughout the summer, until September 2010.

=== The Commons (2011) ===
Within the Contemporary Arts Museum Houston (CAMH) sits Ramírez Jonas's piece called The Commons (2011). Much like his 2009 boulder piece in Porto Alegre, Ramírez Jonas created a riderless horse made of cork for the purpose of allowing the public to use pushpins to leave notices to others. This piece was intentionally ephemeral so that those viewing and involving themselves with this artwork could watch it erode as the material deteriorated. "The Commons" is modeled after the bronze original of Marcus Aurelius atop his steed, Equestrian Statue of Marcus Aurelius, which is located in Campidoglio, Rome. Ramírez Jonas's detail of leaving the horse riderless was intended to give a significant gesture for displaying a horse with no direction—meaning that, without the public, the piece is incomplete.

In 2017, The Commons was part of the exhibition Atlas, Plural, Monumental, a 25-year survey of the artist's work at Contemporary Arts Museum Houston (CAMH).

=== Public Trust (2016 – ongoing) ===
Public Trust was initially staged at three different public squares in Boston, Massachusetts in 2016. The work was a participatory installation which invited participants to consider the impact of their words.

In 2017, Public Trust was part of the exhibition Atlas, Plural, Monumental, a 25-year survey of the artist's work at Contemporary Arts Museum Houston (CAMH).

=== Eternal Flame (2020) ===
‘Eternal Flame’ was a monument in the form of a communal grill and imagined cooking culture as both a symbolic and real eternal flame – there is always a lit cooking fire somewhere on this globe. The work honored the role of cuisine and cooking in cultural cohesion and expression among communities and identities, even when individuals and families relocate locally, nationally or internationally. ‘Eternal Flame’ was designed to recognize the importance of dialogue and exchange. With this in mind, the artist produced a video featuring local chefs preparing recipes and relating stories on each dish’s significance and stating what the eternal flame meant to them. Ramírez Jonas imagines cooking culture as a symbolic eternal flame, enduring in communities for generations, over vast distances. The 5 grills within ‘Eternal Flame’ grills were open for public use during the Park’s open hours, which are every day from 9am to sunset. There was no reservation system, instead the grills were available on a first-come, first-served basis.

=== Key to the City (2022) ===
In 2022, Ramírez Jonas built on his Key to the City project from 2010, allowing anyone to award the "key to the city" to anyone else, without vetting.

=== Let Freedom Ring (2023) ===
In 2023, Ramírez Jonas was one of six artists commissioned to create a temporary installation for the National Mall in conjunction with Beyond Granite: Pulling Together, the first curated art exhibition in the Mall's history. Commissioned by the Trust for the National Mall, National Capital Planning Commission, and National Park Service, Ramírez Jonas designed an interactive arched bell tower that played the song My Country, 'Tis of Thee when activated. Viewers were invited to ring the final note in the song using a separate, larger bell that was out of tune with the rest of the song and was inscribed with phrases celebrating freedom.

== Awards and honors ==
His honors include grants from the Joan Mitchell Foundation in 2008, ArtMatters Foundation in 2008 as support for his project Desahogo, the National Endowment for the Arts (NEA), the Howard Foundation, the International Studio Program in Sweden, and the Atlantic Center for the Arts, among others.

== Teaching ==
Ramírez Jonas has taught at Rhode Island School of Design (RISD), California Institute of the Arts (Cal Arts), Columbia University, New York University (NYU), and the School of the Museum of Fine Arts Boston. Beginning in 2007, he was an associate professor at Hunter College. In July 2021, he left Hunter College for Cornell University where he is a professor and serves a chair of the art department.

== Personal life ==
Ramírez Jonas was married to artist Janine Antoni. The couple met while in graduate school at Rhode Island School of Design. They have a daughter and lived in Brooklyn. Ramirez Jonas married arts professional and founder and former executive director of A Blade of Grass, Deborah Fisher. In 2022, the couple relocated to Ithaca New York after Ramirez Jonas was appointed Chair of the Art Department at Cornell University the previous year.

== Publications ==
- Dean, Daderko (2017). Paul Ramírez Jonas: Atlas, Plural, Monumental. with essays by Bill Arning, Claire Barliant, Shannon Jackson and Dean Daderko. New York: Dancing Foxes Press. ISBN 978-0998632612.
- Alexandra, Garcia Waldman (2016). Paul Ramirez Jonas: Public Trust. with essays by Kate Gilbert, and Alexander Provan. Sao Paulo: APC. ISBN 9788566741032.
- Leigh, Markopoulos (2014). Over the Water: Paul Ramirez Jonas. and McDougall, Marina, eds. San Francisco: Exploratorium.
- Sofia, Hernandez Chong Cuy (2004). Paul Ramirez Jonas. with an essay by Ines Katzenstein, et al. Manchester: Cornerhouse Publications.

== Documentaries ==
- Film: Eternal Flame Socrates Sculpture Park (2020) by RAVA Films.
- Film: Paul Ramirez Jonas: Public Trust (2016) Grand Central Art Center CSUF
- Video: A Conversation with Paul Ramírez Jonas and Claire Bishop (2010) by Creative Time
- Video: Creative Time Summit, Section 4: The Art of Pedagogy with Paul Ramirez Jonas (2015) by Creative Time
