= Tiffany Chung =

Vietnamese American artist

- Born: 1969 (age 56–57); Da Nang, Vietnam
- Education: California State University, Long Beach; University of California, Santa Barbara
- Known for: Cartography drawings, sculpture, video, photograph, and performance art
- Website: www.tiffanychung.net

Tiffany Chung is a Vietnamese American contemporary artist who works primarily in thematic cartography and installation, and is also active in photography, painting, performance, sculpture, and other arts. Chung is globally noted for her interdisciplinary and research-based practice, with works and installations that examine conflict, geopolitical partitioning, spatial transformation, environmental crisis, displacement, and forced migration, across time and terrain.

== Life and education ==
Chung was born in Da Nang, Vietnam, in 1969. She and her family came to the United States as refugees after the Vietnam War. Chung received her Bachelor of Fine Arts in Photography from the California State University, Long Beach and Master of Fine Arts in Studio Art from the University of California, Santa Barbara. As part of the younger generation of overseas Vietnamese returning to Vietnam to live and work, Chung was based in Saigon (Ho Chi Minh City) for over a decade, contributing to the growth of contemporary art in the country, including acting as a co-founder for Sàn Art, a gallery space for independent activists and artists.

== Meaning and origins of her work ==
Chung is known for her meticulously detailed cartographic works and multimedia installations consisting of hand-drawn and embroidered maps, paintings, photographs, sculptures, videos, archival materials, and at times, theater performances. Chung's research and practice delve into an interwoven and complex framework of social, political, economic, and environmental processes in countries impacted by war destruction and climate disasters. Chung's projects are often informed by personal memories and experiences and are extended into larger global contexts. Her work excavates layers in histories of traumatized topographies, creating interventions into the spatial and political narratives produced through statecraft with cultural memories.

While being conscious of the habitual framing of collective memories on violence and victim-hood, a traumatic paradigm in the field of memory studies, Chung believes gestures of remembrance can work through and call for accountability of historical injustices in moving forward. The subtext that runs through many of her projects is the fortitude and agency of people—whose resilience, wisdom, and hope have inspired her work.

== Work and career ==
reconstructing an exodus history: boat trajectories from Vietnam and flight routes from refugee camps and of ODP cases (2020) at the Smithsonian American Art Museum in 2023

In 2019, Chung presented a major solo exhibition at the Smithsonian American Art Museum, Tiffany Chung: Vietnam, Past Is Prologue. The first iteration of Chung's Syria Project was featured in the 56th Venice Biennale's central exhibition All the World’s Futures, with 40 map-based drawings that chart Syria's ever expanding cycles of violence and refugee displacement. Chung has exhibited at museums and biennials worldwide, including the Museum of Modern Art (NY), Nobel Peace Center (Norway), Louisiana MoMA (Denmark), Sharjah Biennale (UAE), Biennial de Cuenca (Ecuador), Sydney Biennale (Australia), Statens Museum for Kunst (Denmark), EVA International–Ireland's Biennial, Centre de Cultura Conteporània de Barcelona (Spain), 21st Century Museum of Contemporary Art, Kanazawa (Japan), among other venues.

In 2023, Chung was one of six artists commissioned to create a temporary installation for the National Mall in conjunction with Beyond Granite: Pulling Together, the first curated art exhibition in the Mall's history. Commissioned by the Trust for the National Mall, National Capital Planning Commission, and National Park Service, Chung created a site-specific installation that resembled a massive sculptural version of her signature map paintings, made with nylon rope positioned on a large map on the ground near the Vietnam Veterans Memorial. Chung's work, For the Living (2023), is a physical representation of the routes taken by migrants and refugees during and after the Vietnam War.

Chung is currently a Mellon Arts & Practitioner Fellow at Yale Center for the Study of Race, Indigeneity, and Transnational Migration (2021). She was a finalist for the Vera List Center Prize and named Jane Lombard Fellow for Art & Social Justice (2018-2020). Chung has been a recipient of other awards, including Asia Arts Game Changer Award by Asia Society India (2020); Asian Cultural Council Grant (2015); Sharjah Biennial Artist Prize for Exceptional Contribution (2013). Her essays on conflict, displacement, migration, and climate impact have been published recently, including "While the World Stands Still: Remembering the Swelling River," After Hope Essays, Asian Art Museum, SF (2021); “The Right of Return,” CoBo Social Publication 2021 et al. 2, ed. Denise Tsui, Hong Kong; “Border,” CONNECTEDNESS: An Incomplete Encyclopedia of the Anthropocene, ed. Marianne Krogh, Strandberg Publishing, Denmark (2020); “While the World Stands Still,” Art at A Time Like This, NY (2020); “[no] victory,” Aroop: Totems and Taboos, Vol.3, No.1, ed. Nancy Adajania & Ashok Vajpeyi, The Raza Foundation, India (2018).

Given Chung's engagement in academic and political discourses, she has been invited to organize and take part in many panel discussions and symposiums on social and political issues, asylum policies and recommendations, decolonizing strategies, and reclaiming the multiplicity of historical memories. Selected talks include “East-West Dialogue with Viet Thanh Nguyen & Tiffany Chung,” East West Fest, Asian Cultural Council, NY (2021); “After Hope: Artists in Conversation,” Museum of African Diaspora & Asian Art Museum, San Francisco (2020); “Profit and Loss” Symposium, University of Toronto, Ontario (2020); “Tiffany Chung: Remapping Histories: Wars, Embattled Sites, and Forced Migration,” Minneapolis Institute of Art (2020); “Tiffany Chung,” James Dicke Contemporary Artist Lecture, SAAM (2019); “Global Voices: Conversations with Jane Lombard Fellows,” If Art Is Politics, Vera List Center Forum, NY (2019); “Citizens and Borders: Migration and Displacement” panel discussion co-organized by MoMA, ZEE Jaipur Literature Festival, India (2017); “Tiffany Chung in conversation with war correspondent Nagieb Khaja,” art alive Kunst Festival, Louisiana MoMA, Denmark (2016); among others.

== Social engagement ==
Investing in the potential outreach of art as a form of political imagination and participation, Chung has consistently extended her practice beyond artmaking. Her fieldwork in Hong Kong between 2015 and 2018 focused on former Vietnamese refugees that were resettled in Hong Kong, a place of transit that turned into a permanent home for them. Inspired by their experience of growing up in detention and organizing protests against deportation, and with materials collected from her research at the UNHCR in Geneva and other sources, Chung put together three panel discussions that focus on asylum policy, refugee experience, and potential change. The participants were Hong Kong based human rights lawyers, these former refugees, and representatives of Trampoline House, a refugee community center in Denmark. Contributing to such conversations shifts the refugees’ victim position to one with agency and brings new meanings to the trauma that many of them have gone through. At the same time, Chung collaborated with a group of young Vietnamese artists in Saigon on a project that prompted these artists to explore the officially erased Vietnam exodus history, through re-rendering archival photographs into watercolor paintings. The first iteration of this project is currently on view in an opening exhibition of the highly anticipated and newly opened M+ museum in Hong Kong, entitled "Hong Kong: Here and Beyond".

In 2016 and 2017, Chung conducted map-making workshops with young refugees living in Denmark in Traveling with Art, an education program initiated by Louisiana MoMA & Danish Red Cross schools. This program facilitates the space and time for these youngsters to practice reflecting and focusing, which is crucial for them to regain hope and direction in life. As she continues to track the conflict and displacement in Syria, as well as the movements of refugees from Africa, the Middle East, Asia, and Central America, Chung's current project aims to shed light on the stories, activism, and self-sustainability of several refugee groups living in the U.S., particularly Syrians, Afghans, and Rohingyas.

During the recent pandemic, Chung worked with her former professor, Kim Yasuda, to conceive and carry out an academic alternative program at UC Santa Barbara, AGENCY | URGENCY: Learning with the Global Souths. A|U draws upon the imagination and agency of artists in social and political change. Under lockdowns, A|U virtually connected a cohort of global art actors with the faculty and students in the Art Department for the informal study and dialogue around various de-colonizing strategies embedded in the practices of artists and curators from the global souths: challenging established narratives and structures, unpacking different forms of knowledge production and cultural dissemination, embracing collectivity and connectivity in interdisciplinary art practice, community engagement, and global solidarity.

== Academic and critical reception ==
Chung's work has been contextualized and presented in other critical disciplines of urban studies, refugee studies, history, and memory studies, besides art. Selected scholars’ publications include The City in Time: Contemporary Art and Urban Form in Vietnam and Cambodia, Pamela N. Corey (Univ. of Washington Press, 2021); Return Engagements: Contemporary Art’s Traumas of Modernity and History in Sài Gòn and Phnom Penh, Việt Lê (Duke Univ. Press, 2021); In Camps: Vietnamese Refugees, Asylum Seekers, and Repatriates, Jana K. Lipman (Univ. of California Press, 2020); “Probeheads Of Resistance and The Heterotopic Mirror: Tiffany Chung and Dinh Q. Lê’s Stratigraphic Cartographies” by Colin Gardner in Arts, Pedagogy and Cultural Resistance New Materialism, ed. Anna Hickey-Moody & Tara Page (Rowman & Littlefield International, 2016); “Tiffany Chung – an archaeology for future remembrance” by Erik Harms (Yale professor in anthropology & author of Luxury and Rubble: Civility and Dispossession in the New Saigon, Univ. of California Press, 2016); Waters Urbanisms East, ed. Bruno De Meulder & Kelly Shannon (Park Books, Zurich, 2013).

Chung's work has also been reviewed in The New York Times, Artforum, Art Asia Pacific, Frieze, Artsy, Hyperallergic, CNN, Wall Street International, Ocula, Houston Chronicle, and others. In 2016, The European Business Review selected her for the “Female Leadership in our Time” special edition, with an interview spread. In the same year, Chung was the subject of Bloomberg TV's Brilliant Ideas documentary series, episode 39. In 2017, the Japan Foundation published an in-depth interview entitled “Tiffany Chung – Excavating and Remapping Erased Histories.” She has also been featured in video interviews by SAAM, Minneapolis Institute of Art, Louisiana MoMA (Denmark), M+ (Hong Kong) and radio programs such as BBC Sounds (UK) and ABC Radio National (Australia).

In 2022, Chung's life and career was illustrated by Rebe Chen for the Smithsonian American Art Museum's project "Drawn to Art: Tales of Inspiring Women Artists," which aims to highlight notable women artists and their stories.

== Public collections ==
British Museum, London, UK.

Smithsonian American Art Museum, D.C., USA.

Louisiana Museum of Modern Art, Humlebæk, Denmark.

San Francisco Museum of Modern Art, San Francisco, CA, USA.

Minneapolis Institute of Art, Minneapolis, MN, USA.

Sharjah Art Foundation, Sharjah, United Arab Emirates.

M+ Museum, Hong Kong.

Faurschou Foundation, Copenhagen, Denmark.

Fukuoka Asian Art Museum, Fukuoka, Japan.

Singapore Art Museum, Singapore.

AK Wien Kultur, Vienna, Austria.

Queensland Art Gallery | Gallery of Modern Art, Brisbane, Australia.

Royal Melbourne Institute of Technology (RMIT), Hanoi/Ho Chi Minh City, Vietnam.

Herbert F. Johnson Art Museum, Cornell University, Ithaca, NY, USA.

Ford Foundation, New York, NY, USA.

Orange County Museum of Art, Newport Beach, CA, USA.

San José Museum of Art, CA, USA.

Smith College Museum of Art, Northampton, MA, USA.

Albright-Knox Art Gallery, Buffalo, NY, USA.

Cummer Museum, Jacksonville, FL, USA.
