= Janine Antoni =

Bahamian–born American artist

- Born: January 19, 1964 (age 62); Freeport, Bahamas
- Education: Sarah Lawrence College, Rhode Island School of Design
- Known for: Performance art, Sculpture, Installation art
- Movement: Feminist Art Movement
- Awards: MacArthur Genius Grant

Janine Antoni (born January 19, 1964) is a Bahamian–born American artist, who creates contemporary work in performance art, sculpture, and photography. Antoni's work focuses on process and the transitions between the making and finished product, often portraying feminist ideals. She emphasizes the human body in her pieces, such as her mouth, hair, eyelashes, and, through technological scanning, her brain. Antoni uses her body as a tool of creation or as the subject of her pieces, exploring intimacy between the spectator and the artist. Her work blurs the distinction between performance art and sculpture.

She describes her work by saying "I am interested in extreme acts that pull you in, as unconventional as they may be."

She currently resides in Brooklyn, New York. She is represented by Luhring Augustine Gallery, NY, and Anthony Meier Fine Arts, San Francisco.

== Early life and education ==
Antoni was born January 19, 1964, in Freeport, Bahamas. In 1977, she moved to Florida to attend boarding school. She graduated from Sarah Lawrence College in 1986 with a B.A.degree. She received a M.F.A. degree in 1989 in Sculpture from Rhode Island School of Design. Although she was educated in the United States, her experience growing up in the Bahamas is influential in her work. Her difficulty acclimating to American society is what drove her to use her body as a tool, as she felt her body language made her stand out.

== Career ==
Tableau vivants, a static scene containing one or more actors or models, are an art form that Antoni has used in her work. In her installation Slumber (1994), Antoni slept in the gallery for 28 days and while she slept, an EEG machine recorded her REM patterns, which she then wove into a blanket from the night gown under which she slept. This particular work was seen as a tableau vivant because of its embrace of spectacle and its reliance on Antoni's physical presence:

The aspirational focus of this tableau vivant, while situating the artist as an object on view, simulataneously [sic] insists on an aesthetics of connections: between the artist and beholders, between the artists [sic] and the art institutions, and between the artist's conscious and unconscious processes.

Antoni explains this desire to be involved in the viewer's experience when she writes:

[Performance] wasn't something that I intended to do. I was doing work that was about process, about the meaning of the making, trying to have a love-hate relationship with the object. I always feel safer if I can bring the viewer back to the making of it. I try to do that in a lot of different ways, by residue, by touch, by these processes that are basic to all of our lives... that people might relate to in terms of process... everyday activities--bathing, eating, etc. But there are times when the best way to keep people in that place, which for me is so alive and pertinent, is to show the process or the making.

She says of this performer/audience interaction: "This letter sums up my relationship to my audience. I have a deep love for the viewer; they are my imaginary friend."

Antoni has cited Louise Bourgeois as a strong artistic influence, referring to Bourgeois as her "art mother." She also cites Robert Smithson as an influence.

== Public Collections (selection) ==
Antoni's work is in various public museum collections, including the Pérez Art Museum Miami (PAMM), San Francisco Museum of Modern Art (SFMoMA), National Gallery of Art, the Solomon R. Guggenheim Museum, The Broad, the Metropolitan Museum of Art, among others.

She was interviewed for Lynn Hershman Leeson's 2010 documentary film, !Women Art Revolution.

== Work ==
=== Gnaw (1992) ===
In her work Gnaw (1992), Antoni used her mouth to bite, chew, and carve the corners and edges of two 600 lb (300 kg) cubes, one made of chocolate and the other of lard. She collected the removed pieces of chocolate and lard to create a separate mock store front display which she called Lipstick/Phenylthylamine Display, consisting of heart-shaped boxes made of chocolate and lipstick tubes filled with a "lard, pigment, and beeswax". Antoni made a statement about her work saying "Lard is a stand-in for the female body, a feminine material, since females typically have a higher fat content than males, making the work somewhat cannibalistic". In this work, Antoni addresses the transformation in cultural acceptance of feminine desire and sexuality.

=== Loving Care (1993) ===
In Loving Care (1993), Antoni used her hair as a paintbrush and Loving Care hair dye as her paint. Dipping her hair in a bucket of dye, Antoni mopped the gallery floor on her hands and knees, pushing viewers out of the space as she coated the floor in color. In this process Antoni explored the body, as well as themes of power, femininity, and the style of abstract expressionism. This performance took place at the Anthony d'Offay Gallery, London, in 1993.

=== Lick and Lather (1993) ===
In Lick and Lather (1993), Antoni produced fourteen busts of herself, seven cast from chocolate and the other seven from soap. She then "re-sculpts" the busts by licking the chocolate and bathing herself with the soap as the title suggests, distorting each bust's appearance. The installation portrays complex ideas of femininity and Antoni's relationship with herself as a woman. Washing, bathing, and eating are indulgent, self-loving acts, and in her destruction of her own image using these methods she explores the love/hate relationship that we have with ourselves. In an interview in 1996, Antoni discussed the defacing of the chocolate bust in installation, as somebody had bitten the nose off. Antoni states, "I didn't want to leave it as part of the piece because, for me, the licking was very important, in the sense that it was a very loving act, very different than Gnaw". The soap has been interpreted by some as a symbol of the societal expectations placed on women, as they are required to be "clean" in a metaphorical and literal sense. The chocolate can also be connected to stereotypical ideas of womanhood in its common consumption by women.

=== Slumber (1994) ===
Slumber was a performance piece which stretched over the course of many weeks. Antoni spent the first weeks sleeping in the gallery space, a room with no decor, filled only by a wire-frame bed and a desk with a computer and wires. She slept with a blanket which she wove during the day, creating an infinite blanket connected to a loom that she slept with at night. While Antoni slept, she recorded her eye movements using an electroencephalogram, and weaves recreations of the recorded data made of her nightgown into the blanket. The piece comments on connections: between the artist and the viewer, the artist and art institutions, and the artist's conscious and unconscious processes.

=== Tear (2008) ===
In Tear (2008), Antoni created a wrecking ball in lead and then used it to demolish a building synchronized with the blinking of her eyelid. Each impact damaged the surface of the ball, thus telling its history. The intention of this project was to leave the viewer to interpret the psychological reaction of danger.

=== Conduit (2009) ===
In Conduit (2009), Antoni transformed a copper gargoyle into a sculptural tool that allowed her to urinate while standing, equating her body with the architectural form. Drawing inspiration from the mythical griffin, Antoni's hybrid device evokes both plumbing and architectural elements, with the oxidized copper bearing the physical traces of her performative act.

=== Crowned (2013) ===
Antoni's Crowned (2013) was inspired after her giving birth in 2004 to her daughter. The work consists of a sculpture of a wall with plaster crown molding, with two plaster pelvic bones protruding from the wall, framed by plaster splashed around the objects. The sculpture visually resembles the second stage in childbirth called, "crowning," when the baby's head is surrounded by the vaginal orifice.

=== I Am Fertile Ground (2019) ===
I Am Fertile Ground (2019) was a site-specific installation in the catacombs of Green-Wood Cemetery in Brooklyn, New York. Small photographs, close-ups of living bodies, are presented in gilded frames shaped to look like human bones. The work speaks to the fragility of the human form, surrounded as it was by the remains of some 560,000 individuals buried at Green-Wood, one of the earliest examples of a large park-like and varied in style cemetery, built in rural America.

== Teaching ==
Since 2000, Antoni has taught fine art in a graduate course called "Master Class/Mentor Groups" at Columbia University, School of the Arts.

== Personal life ==
Antoni was married to artist Paul Ramirez Jonas, and together they have a daughter. The couple met while in graduate school at Rhode Island School of Design.

== Awards ==
- 1996 – IMMA Glen Dimplex Artists Award
- 1998 – Genius Grant, MacArthur Fellow
- 1998 – Painting and Sculpture Grant, the Joan Mitchell Foundation
- 1998 – Larry Aldrich Foundation Award
- 1999 – New Media Award
- 2003 – Artistic Achievement Award, Rhode Island School of Design
- 2011 – Guggenheim Fellow
- 2012 – Creative Capital Grant
- 2014 – Anonymous Was A Woman Grant
