= Gabriel Gotthard Sweidel =

Finnish church painter (1744–1813)

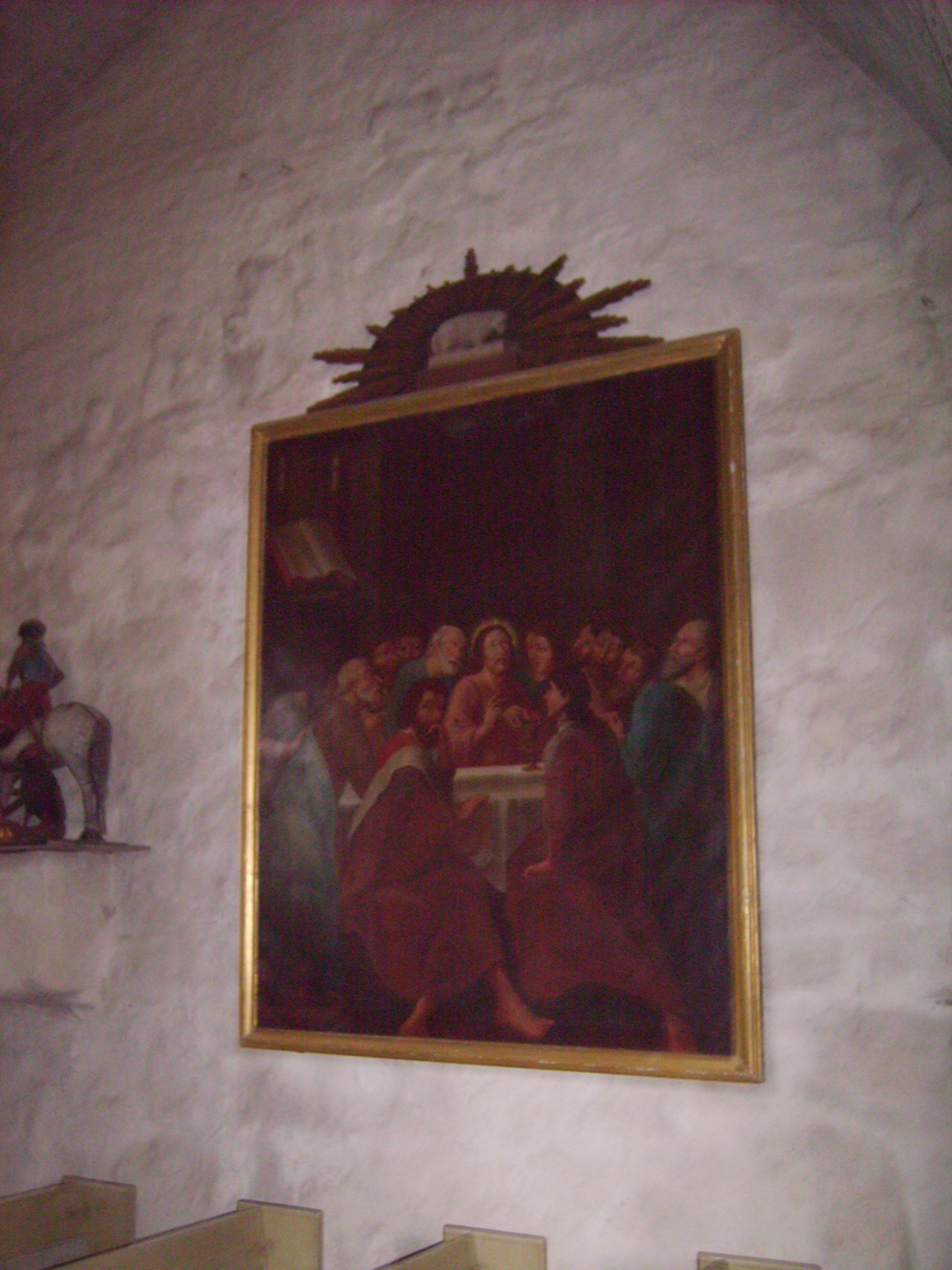
The Last Supper by Gabriel Gotthard Sweidel, medieval church in Korpo

Gabriel Gotthard Sweidel, also Sveidel or Sweidell, (1744 – 22 March 1813, in Turku) was a Finnish church painter.

Sweidel worked as a master painter in Turku, painting primarily religious-themed works for church commissions. He married Gustava Stock Berg May 18, 1786. Their son, Joel Robert Sveidel was ordained a priest in 1820. He painted altarpieces for the Korpo church in 1792, the church of Kökar in 1803, and the Kokemäki Church in 1811.
