= Pavel Zoubok Gallery =

Art gallery in Manhattan, New York

Coordinates: 40.750247°N 74.004049°W

Pavel Zoubok Gallery is an art gallery in New York City. Founded in 1997 by Pavel Zoubok, the gallery's program focuses on collage, assemblage, and mixed media installation.
