= Sia Michel =

American journalist

- Born: May 17, 1967 (age 59); Erie, Pennsylvania
- Education: University of Pennsylvania
- Occupations: Culture editor, The New York Times
- Writing career
- Genres: Arts, culture and social justice
- Notable work: Became the first woman to edit a large-circulation American rock magazine

Sia Michel (born May 17, 1967, in Erie, Pennsylvania) is an American newspaper editor. As editor-in-chief of Spin, she became the first woman to edit a large-circulation American rock magazine. Subsequently appointed as the deputy culture editor of The New York Times, she was promoted to the position of Culture editor in January 2023.

== Biography ==
After Michel graduated from the University of Pennsylvania, she began her journalism career as a reporter and music editor with SF Weekly.

Michel has won several awards for reporting and feature writing, including a 1999 ASCAP Deems Taylor Award for her reporting on the death of hip-hop icon The Notorious B.I.G.

In February 2002, she was appointed as editor-in-chief of Spin after having worked at the magazine for five years. The first woman to edit a large-circulation American rock magazine, she held that position until February 2006 when the magazine was bought out by new owners. During the time of her editorial leadership, the publication had a circulation of more than half a million readers.

Hired by The New York Times in 2007, she was subsequently promoted to the position of editor of Arts & Leisure and pop music editor for the publication. She was then appointed deputy editor in 2018. During her tenure with the Times, she has served as a primary editor for Pulitzer Prize-winning film critic Wesley Morris and contributing critic at large Salamishah Tillet. In January 2023, Michel was appointed as the publication's new Culture editor.

== See also ==
- History of journalism
- Women in journalism
