= Portrait of George II =

Painting by Thomas Hudson

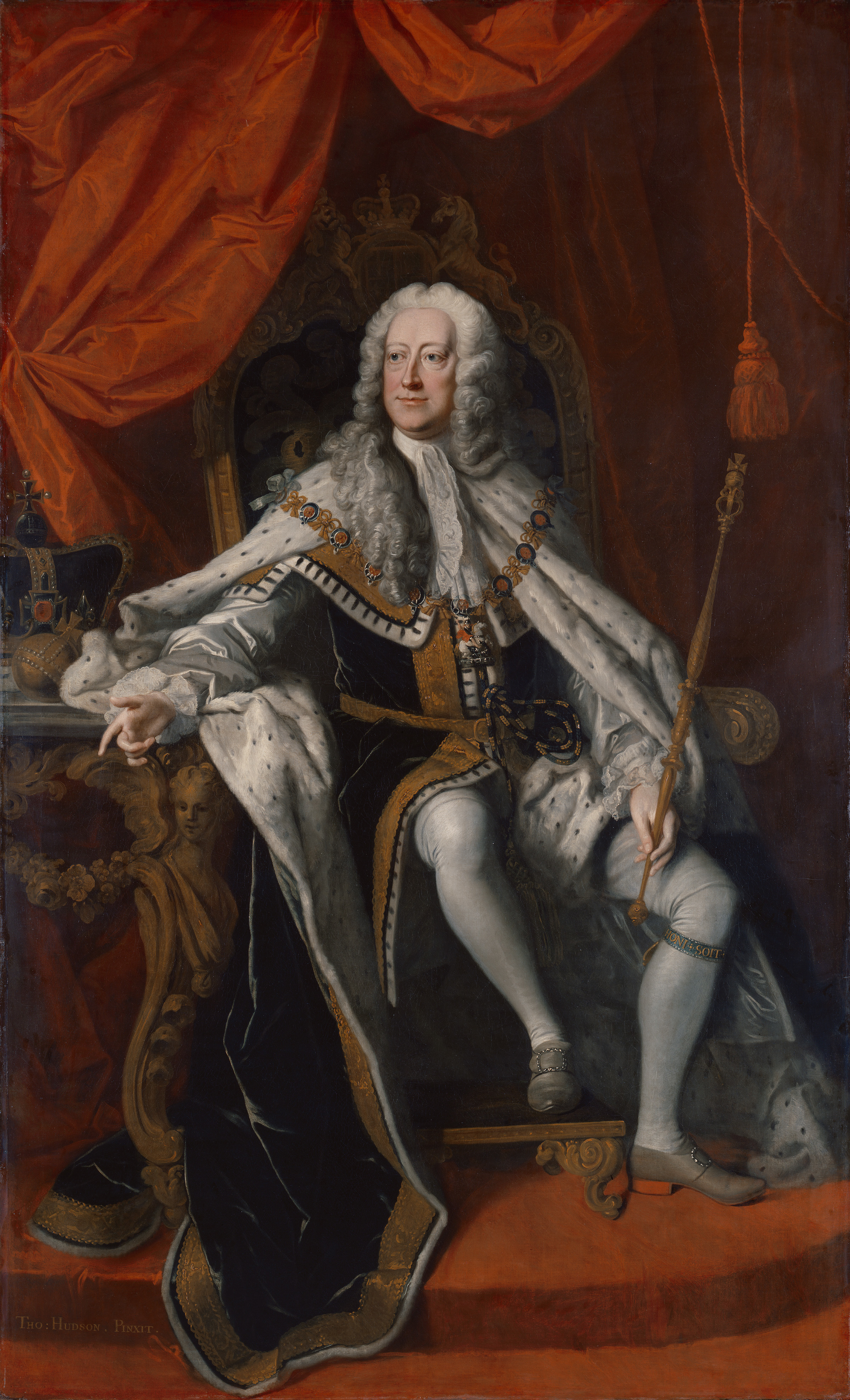
- Artist: Thomas Hudson
- Year: 1744
- Type: Oil on canvas, portrait
- Dimensions: 218.8 cm × 146.7 cm (86.1 in × 57.8 in)
- Location: National Portrait Gallery; London

Portrait of George II is a 1744 portrait painting by the British artist Thomas Hudson depicting George II of Great Britain. The German-born George reigned as King of Great Britain, King of Ireland and Elector of Hanover from 1727 to 1760. He notably led Allied troops to victory at the Battle of Dettingen the previous year, an event commemorated in a painting by John Wootton.

This portrait features the king sitting on his throne with his crown and other symbols of sovereignty. It was commissioned by the judge John Willes for the Court of Common Pleas in Westminster. Today the painting is the collection of the National Portrait Gallery having been acquired in 1883.

== Bibliography ==
- Ormond, Richard, The Face of Monarchy: British Royalty Portrayed. Phaidon, 1977.
- Smith, Hannah. Georgian Monarchy: Politics and Culture, 1714-1760. Cambridge University Press, 2006.
- Thompson, Andrew C. George II: King and Elector. Yale University Press, 2011.
- Williamson, David. The National Portrait Gallery History of the Kings and Queens of England. Barnes & Noble Books, 2003.
