= Salamishah Tillet =

American scholar, writer, and feminist activist (born 1975)

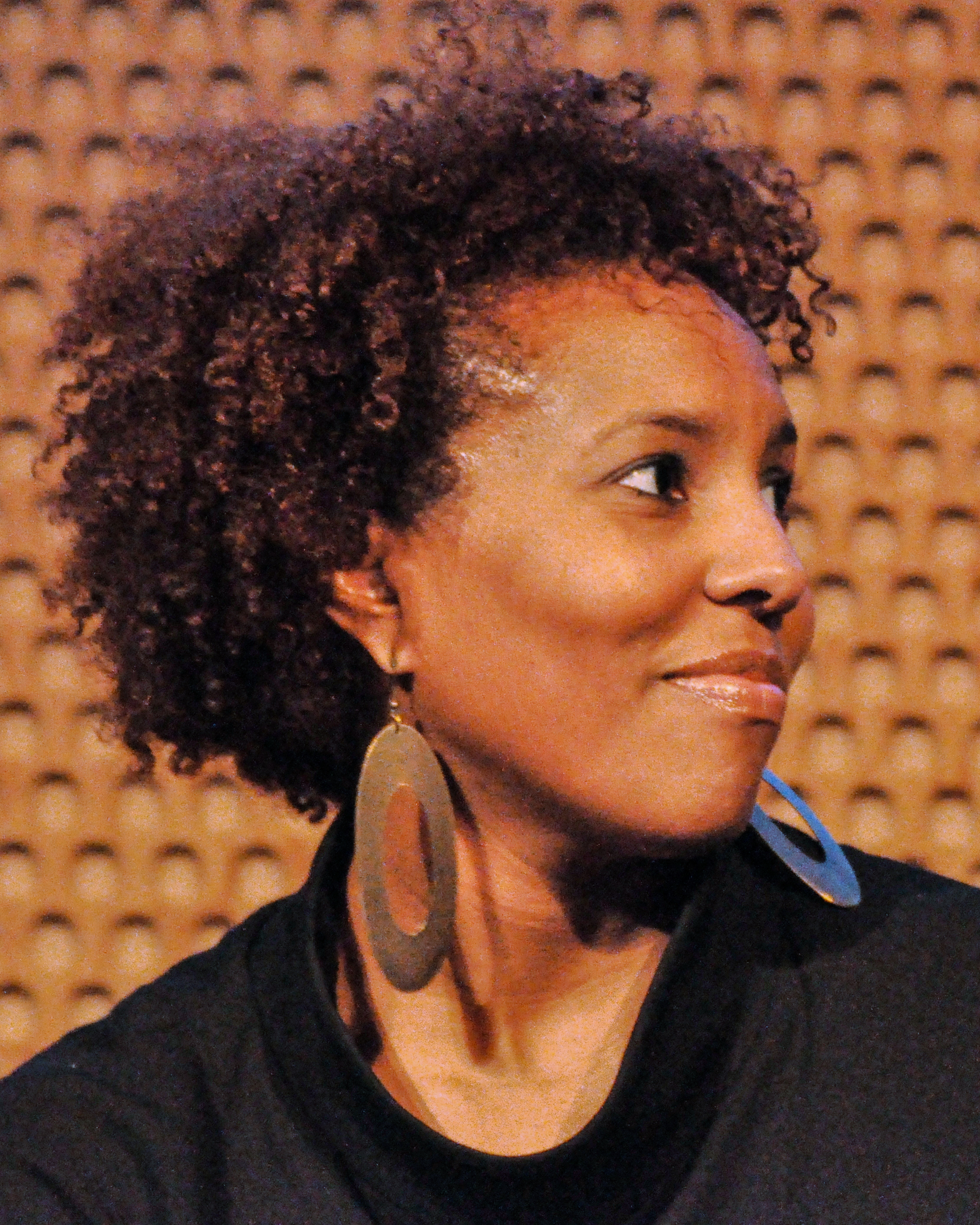
- Tillet in 2010
- Born: Salamishah Margaret Tillet; August 25, 1975 (age 51); Boston, Massachusetts, U.S.
- Awards: Pulitzer Prize for Criticism (2022)

Academic background
- Education: University of Pennsylvania (BA); Brown University (MA); Harvard University (MA, PhD)

Academic work
- Notable works: Sites of Slavery: Citizenship and Racial Democracy in the Post–Civil Rights Imagination

Salamishah Margaret Tillet (born August 25, 1975) is an American scholar, writer, and feminist activist. She is the Henry Rutgers Professor of African American Studies and Creative Writing at Rutgers University–Newark, where she also directs the New Arts Justice Initiative. Tillet is also a contributing critic-at-large at The New York Times.

In 2003, Salamishah co-founded A Long Walk Home, a Chicago-based non-profit that uses art to empower young people to end violence against girls and women. Tillet received the Pulitzer Prize for Criticism in 2022 for "learned and stylish writing about Black stories in art and popular culture–work that successfully bridges academic and nonacademic critical discourse."

== Early life and education ==
Tillet was born in Boston, Massachusetts, to Lennox Tillet and Volora Howell. Her name, Salamishah, combines "salaam", the Arabic word for peace; "mi", her parents' interpretation of black; and "shah", a Persian royal title. Upon her parents' separation, she lived in Boston with her mother. Tillet and her sister Scheherazade moved to her father's city of Port of Spain, Trinidad in 1985 after her mother was sexually assaulted. In Port of Spain, Tillet attended Mucurapo Girls School and St. Joseph's Convent. In 1988, Tillet returned to the United States, where she lived in Orange, New Jersey and attended Newark Academy in Livingston. During her high school years Tillet developed an interest in literature, played soccer, and ran track. She set school records for the 300-meter and 600-meter indoor races.

Tillet attended the University of Pennsylvania, where she originally intended to study law. However, taking courses on topics such as jazz and literature with professors such as Farah Jasmine Griffin, transformed Tillet's trajectory and interests. Under the mentorship of Griffin, Tillet began to understand the impact of work in academia. In an interview with Kathryn Levy Feldman from the Penn Gazette, Tillet states, "I didn't grow up having academics in my family... I didn't know you could be an English Professor, but Farah provided a lot of insight as well as a model for how I could do work that was relevant." At this time, Tillet "made a conscious commitment to writing my own scholarly works in accessible language and to be politically engaged".

Tillet earned a B.A. in English and African American Studies from Penn, graduating magna cum laude and Phi Beta Kappa in 1996. The following year, she earned her Master of Arts in Teaching from Brown University. In 2002, she earned an A.M. in English and American Literature from Harvard University. She subsequently earned a Ph.D. in the History of American Civilization (now American Studies) in 2007, also from Harvard. At Harvard, Henry Louis Gates, Jr. and Werner Sollors co-chaired her dissertation, "Peculiar Memories: Slavery and the Cultural Imagination."

== Career ==
Tillet returned to the University of Pennsylvania in 2007 to join the faculty in the English Department. Her research and courses there included topics in American studies, 20th and 21st-century African-American literature, film, popular music, cultural studies, and feminist theory. Tillet's courses included Family Feuds: Beyonce, Jay-Z, and Solange and the Meaning of American Music, No Bench By the Road: Monuments, Memory, and the Afterlife of Slavery, "Where My Girls At?": African American Women Performers in the 20th Century, and Black Rage: Race, Affect, and the Politics of Feeling.

Tillet teaches courses in creative nonfiction and African-American studies in the MFA program in the Department of English, Creative Writing and Department of African-American and African Studies at Rutgers University—Newark.

Tillet is based in Newark, New Jersey, where she lives with her partner and two children.

== A Long Walk Home ==
In 2003, Salamishah and her sister Scheherazade Tillet co-founded A Long Walk Home (ALWH), a Chicago-based nonprofit that uses art to empower young people to end violence against girls and women. Through its programs, multimedia performances and college workshops, ALWH has educated survivors and activists to build safe communities and eliminate gender violence. A Long Walk Home works with artists, students, activists, therapists, community organizations, and cultural institutions to elevate marginalized voices, facilitate healing, and activate social change.

Twenty years before #MeToo, A Long Walk Home emerged as a leading organization in the United States using black feminist justice approaches to combat gender violence and racism. ALWH has been the recipient of the Face History and Ourselves "Upstanders" Award, the Moxie Award for Excellence and Creativity from Illinois Coalition Against Sexual Assault, the Chicago Foundation for Women's Impact Awards, the Bright Promise Foundation's Ed Marciniak Bright Star Award, and part of the 2nd Move to End Violence cohort—a 10-year initiative by the NoVo Foundation designed to strengthen the collective capacity to end violence against girls and women in the United States.

=== Story of a Rape Survivor (SOARS) ===
In 1997, Tillet told her sister that she had been raped twice in college. That next year, while enrolled in her first social documentary photography class, Scheherazade asked Salamishah if she could document Tillet's healing journey, which included the reclamation of her sexuality, spirituality, and body. Throughout her photographic journey, both Scheherazade and Salamishah discovered ways to heal Salamishah, her family, and others. By 1999, the Tillet sisters invited a cast of black women artists to bring those images to the 90-minute performance, Story of a Rape Survivor (SOARS), which is a collective portrait of one black woman's survival of sexual assault. SOARS is a record of black women as the earliest trailblazers in ALWH's current movement to end sexual violence against all people. Feminist icon Gloria Steinem described SOARS as "a gift that beautifully blends art, policy, and grassroots organizing to empower our most vulnerable and voiceless Americans." It is being adapted into a documentary film by Yvonne Shirley.

=== The Girl/Friends Leadership Institute ===
In 2009, A Long Walk Home launched Girl/Friends, a youth-centered leadership program that amplifies the voices and creative visions of girls and women of color. Created as a safety net for adolescent girls who are most vulnerable to racial and gender-based violence, Girl/Friends has been at the forefront of Chicago's most recent campaigns to end violence against girls and young women, which includes sexual and domestic violence, crimes against queer and gender non-conforming girls, gun violence, and police brutality.

For its innovative and intersectional strategy to combat gender violence, A Long Walk Home has been featured in The Chicago Reader, Chicago Tribune, The New Yorker, The New York Times, The Washington Post, on CNN, MSNBC, and NPR. ALWH has also been awarded major grants from the With and For Girls Collective and the NoVo Foundation. Salamishah and her sister, Scheherazade, were finalists for Glamour's Women of the Year Award for their work to end violence against girls and women.

== New Arts Justice ==
New Arts Justice is an incubator within Rutgers University-Newark that is committed to feminist approaches to art's relationship to place, social justice, and civic engagement. It was inspired by poet and activist Amiri Baraka's 1968 film The NEW-ARK and concerns racial justice education, urban public theater, and political consciousness-raising in Newark.

Housed in Express Newark, under the directorship of Tillet, New Arts Justice is a joint partnership between the Clement A. Price Institute on Ethnicity, Culture, and Modern Experience and Express Newark that:

- Curates inside/outside public art installations and exhibitions throughout the city of Newark
- Supports emerging to mid-career fine artists and curators who actively practice socially-engaged art
- Promotes and publishes innovative scholarly research and data collection on art and civic engagement

=== A Call to Peace ===
A Call to Peace was a public art and history exhibition co-curated by New Arts Justice and Monument Lab around a central question: What is a timely monument for Newark? The exhibition was conceived in response to Military Park's Wars of America monument (1926), built by sculptor Gutzon Borglum. Borglum, famed for creating Mount Rushmore and designing a Confederate monument on Stone Mountain in Georgia, was also affiliated with the Ku Klux Klan and used granite from Stone Mountain as the pedestal for his sculpture in Newark.

A Call to Peace includes four temporary prototype monuments by artists Manuel Acevedo, Chakaia Booker, Sonya Clark, and Jamel Shabazz, who each responded to the exhibition's central question. The artists' projects respectively focus on underrepresented veterans, engaging the legacies of the Confederate statues, and addressing the relationship between public spaces and historical memory. The artists were invited based on their interdisciplinary approaches to monumental work and their innovative approaches to art and social justice.

== Publications ==
Tillet published the book Sites of Slavery: Citizenship and Racial Democracy in the Post-Civil Rights Imagination in 2012. The book examines how contemporary African-American artists and writers use slavery as a metaphor for their feelings of exclusion and estrangement in the United States. The text originated as an independent study project on 18th and 19th-century slave narratives when Tillet was an undergraduate. Tillet says Sites of Slavery "comes out of my desire to understand why contemporary African-American artists and intellectuals are so preoccupied with returning to the theme of slavery in their works and how their representations of the past help understand our racial present better."

American literary critic Henry Louis Gates Jr. called Sites of Slavery "an original contribution and a dazzling analysis of the many ways slavery lives in the contemporary imagination and colors our past, present, and future". Valerie Smith, President of Swarthmore College, notes: "This book will transform the way we think about the place of African-American cultural production in relation to 'post-civil right era' political discourse."

Tillet has contributed to scholarly journals and publications. In 2010, Tillet co-edited a special issue on Ethiopia, literature, and art for Callaloo: A Journal of African Diaspora Arts and Letter. She has also produced chapters and articles, including "'I Got No Comfort in This Life': The Increasing Importance of Patsey in 12 Years a Slave", for American Literary History, "Elle Perez: On Feminism" for a special issue of Aperture magazine, and "'You Want to Be Well?': Self-Care as a Black Feminist Intervention in Art Therapy" in Art Therapy for Social Justice: Radical Intersections. Tillet has also written the liner notes, "Nina Simone: The Voice of a People", for Nina Simone Sings the Blues and "Freedom Then, Freedom Now" for Wake Up! by John Legend and the Roots.

Tillet wrote the nonfiction book In Search of The Color Purple: The Story of an American Masterpiece, published in January 2021 by Abrams Books. Currently, she is working on All the Rage: "Mississippi Goddam." and the World Nina Simone Made with Ecco Press.

Tillet has presented her scholarly and activist work at various conferences, festivals, and seminars hosted at universities and institutions such as Boston College, Brown University, Duke University, New York University, and Princeton University. A few of her lectures include "'We Would Have to Fight the World': The Global Influence & Afterlife of the Combahee River Collective", at the National Women's Studies Association in Baltimore, "Real Talk: On Black Girlhood and the Future of Feminism," at the Toni Cade Bambara Scholar-Activism Conference at Spelman College, and "Black Girls in Search of Justice: The Bluest Eye, Brown v. Board, and The Fate of Black Girlhood" at Loyola University.

Tillet has co-organized projects and conferences including The Continuum Violence Project, an incubator for policyholders, activists, and academics who work on ending violence—gun control, community and gang violence, and gender-based violence. She co-organized Black Girl Movement: A National Conference, a conference hosted by Columbia University that focused on the experiences and realities of Black girls in the United States. Tillet has interviewed Oprah Winfrey, Shonda Rhimes, Spike Lee, Kerry Washington, Ava DuVernay, Solange Knowles, Michael B. Jordan, and Suzan Lori-Parks. Tillet has appeared on broadcasts, radio shows, and podcasts on platforms such as MSNBC, CNN, and C-SPAN. She has also appeared in the documentaries Surviving R. Kelly and NO! The Rape Documentary by Aishah Shahidah Simmons.

Tillet is a cultural critic who has written for a number of publications including "Solange: The Messenger" for Elle magazine, "'Black Panther': Why Not Queen Shuri?" for The Hollywood Reporter, and "Quentin Tarantino's Exceptional Slave: "Django Unchained'" for CNN: In America. She is a regular writer for the Culture and Opinion sections of The New York Times and has written "Why Harvey Weinstein's Guilt Matters to Black Women", "After the 'Surviving R. Kelly' Documentary, #MeToo Has Finally Returned to Black Girls", and "Nina Simone's Time is Now: Again".

== Awards ==
In 2010, the University of Pennsylvania awarded Tillet with the Edmund J. and Louise W. Kahn Award for Distinguished Teaching by an Assistant Professor. Tillet was a 2010-2011 recipient of a Career Enhancement Fellowship from the Woodrow Wilson National Fellowship Foundation. During that academic year, she served as a visiting fellow at the Center of African American Studies at Princeton University. From 2013-14, she was a scholar-in-residence at the New York Public Library's Schomburg Center for Research in Black Culture located in Harlem. In 2019, she was awarded the Badass Art Woman Award by the Project of Empty Space.

In May 2022, Tillet was awarded the Pulitzer Prize for Criticism for "learned and stylish writing about Black stories in art and popular culture–work that successfully bridges academic and nonacademic critical discourse". Her primary editor, Sia Michel, described Tillet as someone who pitches "Text after text of ideas. So many ideas. And they are brilliant, surprising and steeped in history."

For her leadership in activism and advancing girls' and women's rights, Tillet was named one of the "Top 50 Global Leaders Ending Violence Against Children" by the Together for Girls' Safe magazine and America's "Top Leaders Under 30" by Ebony.

== Bibliography ==
- Tillet, Salamishah (2012). Sites of Slavery: Citizenship and Racial Democracy in the Post-Civil Rights Imagination. Durham: Duke University Press. ISBN 978-0-8223-5242-6.
- Tillet, Salamishah (2021). In Search of The Color Purple: The Story of an American Masterpiece. New York. ISBN 978-1-4197-3530-1.
