= Tippet Rise Art Center =

Arts venue in Montana, United States

Tippet Rise Art Center in Fishtail, Montana.

Tippet Rise Art Center is an arts venue located on an 12,000-acre working ranch (4,900 ha) in southcentral Montana, north of Yellowstone National Park. Established in 2016, the art center presents concerts of classical music and exhibits large-scale contemporary outdoor sculptures.

Tippet Rise has the stated purpose of celebrating the union of music, art, architecture, and landscape. Its patrons are artists and philanthropists, Peter and Cathy Halstead. Cathy Halstead is an abstract painter and Peter Halstead is a pianist, photographer, and poet. Cathy Halstead is the daughter of Sidney Frank, who was an entrepreneur and philanthropist.

Tippet Rise's sculpture collection includes three sculptural structures by Ensamble Studio, two works by Alexander Calder on loan from the Hirshhorn Museum and Sculpture Garden as well as works by Patrick Dougherty, Mark di Suvero, and Stephen Talasnik. In July 2019, a new structure designed by the architect Diébédo Francis Kéré opened to the public.

The art center is open to the public in limited numbers during the months of July, August and September. Reservations are required to visit Tippet Rise.

== Outdoor sculptures ==
External videos
- Arts outdoors. PBS Newshour, October 11, 2019, 47:29-56:52,

Tippet Rise opened in 2016 with eight large-scale works by modern masters.

- Beethoven's Quartet by Mark di Suvero – originally part of the collection at Storm King Art Center
- Proverb by Mark di Suvero – (2002) formerly in the Dallas Arts District
- Two Discs – (1965) by Alexander Calder
- The Stainless Stealer – (1966) by Alexander Calder
- The Inverted Portal by the Spanish architecture firm Ensamble Studio
- The Beartooth Portal by the Spanish architecture firm Ensamble Studio
- The Domo by the Spanish architecture firm Ensamble Studio
- Satellite No. 5 Pioneer by Stephen Talasnik
- Daydreams by Patrick Dougherty, a model of a nineteenth-century schoolhouse designed by CTA Architects Engineers, engulfed by twigs

Tippet Rise shares similarities with large sculpture parks such as Storm King Art Center in New York and Gibbs Farm in New Zealand.

== Music venues and performances ==
Tippet Rise Art Center includes three venues for live classical music performances and chamber music recitals:

The Olivier Music Barn

An informal and acoustically intimate indoor performance space with a direct view of the Beartooth Mountains. The scale and proportions of the 150-seat Olivier Music Barn are inspired by the Esterhazy Music Room, the performance space for which Franz Joseph Haydn composed his chamber music repertoire. A contemporary innovation—a high ceiling suspended above the boxlike space—is said to lend an elevated, ethereal character to the resonant acoustics, but is designed to mimic the pitched roof of a traditional wood barn. The building also houses Tippet Rise's visitor center, which includes a state-of-the-art recording room with 3D sound this summer and 4K high definition film projection capabilities.

In January, 2019, Tippet Rise received LEED Gold certification from the U.S. Green Building Council for the Olivier Music Barn's environmentally sustainable design and systems, including low-carbon emissions and near-net-zero energy consumption. All buildings on the art center's main campus are heated and cooled with a geothermal energy system; 8,000 square-feet of solar panels provide light and power to buildings and vehicles. Water consumption is minimized by collecting and reusing rain and snowmelt for irrigation..

The Domo

Cast from the land at Tippet Rise and designed by the Spanish architectural firm, Ensamble Studio, founded in 2000 by Antón García-Abril and Débora Mesa, the Domo is considered equal parts, land art, sculpture, and performance space.

The Tiara Acoustic Shell

An outdoor, 100-seat, portable venue.

Musical Performances

The inaugural season, in 2016, included seven weeks of classical music performances by world-renowned musicians and rising stars. Since 2016, many musicians have performed at Tippet Rise Art Center. These include pianists Anne-Marie McDermott, Wu Han, Stephen Hough, Yevgeny Sudbin, and Pedja Muzijevic; cellists David Finckel and Matt Haimovitz, violinist Caroline Goulding; the Ariel String Quartet, and the Orchestra of St. Luke's St. Luke's Chamber Ensemble.

== Personnel ==
Pedja Muzijevic currently serves as the art center's Artistic Advisor. Born in Sarajevo, Bosnia and Herzegovina, Muzijevic studied piano with Vladimir Krpan at the Academy of Music in Zagreb. He came to the United States in 1984 to continue his education at the Curtis Institute of Music in Philadelphia and The Juilliard School in New York. He has played recitals at Lincoln Center's Alice Tully Hall and Mostly Mozart Festival, 92Y and The Frick Collection in New York, Spoleto USA, and others. His symphonic engagements include the Atlanta Symphony, Dresden Philharmonic, St. Paul Chamber Orchestra, and Zagreb Philharmonic. Muzijevic is also the Artistic Administrator at Baryshnikov Arts Center in New York and the Artistic Director of Concert in the 21st Century, a residency program at the Banff Centre for Arts & Creativity in Canada.

Christopher O’Riley served as the art center's inaugural Artistic Advisor. The late Charles Hamlen, co-founder of IMG Artists, served as Artistic Advisor for the 2017 and 2018 seasons.

== Films & Sound Recording ==
Tippet Rise Art Center created numerous films and audio recordings since its inception in 2016. Mickey Houlihan oversaw the 9.1 surround sound recording studio development and production. Kathy Kasic served as the center's film director from 2016-2018, working in conjunction with producer Mickey Houlihan on over 70 productions of music performances, documentaries and lyrical films.

== Location ==
Tippet Rise Art Center is located near Fishtail, Montana about a 1.5 hour drive southwest of Billings Montana or a 2-hour drive southeast of Bozeman. It is north of the Beartooth Mountains, the Custer National Forest, the Absaroka-Beartooth Wilderness, and Yellowstone National Park.

Some residents of the area were aggrieved by the construction of the facility in what was previously an undeveloped site.
