= Marcantonio Riverditi =

Italian painter

Marcantonio Riverditi (died 1744) was an Italian painter of the Baroque. He was born in Alessandria della Paglia, and trained in Bologna, where he followed the style of Guido Reni.

He painted portraits and altarpieces such as an Annunciation for the church of the Padri Camaldolesi and a S. Francesco di Paola for the church of Santa Maria de Foscherari. He died at Bologna.
