= Ashon Crawley =

American scholar of religion, author, and artist

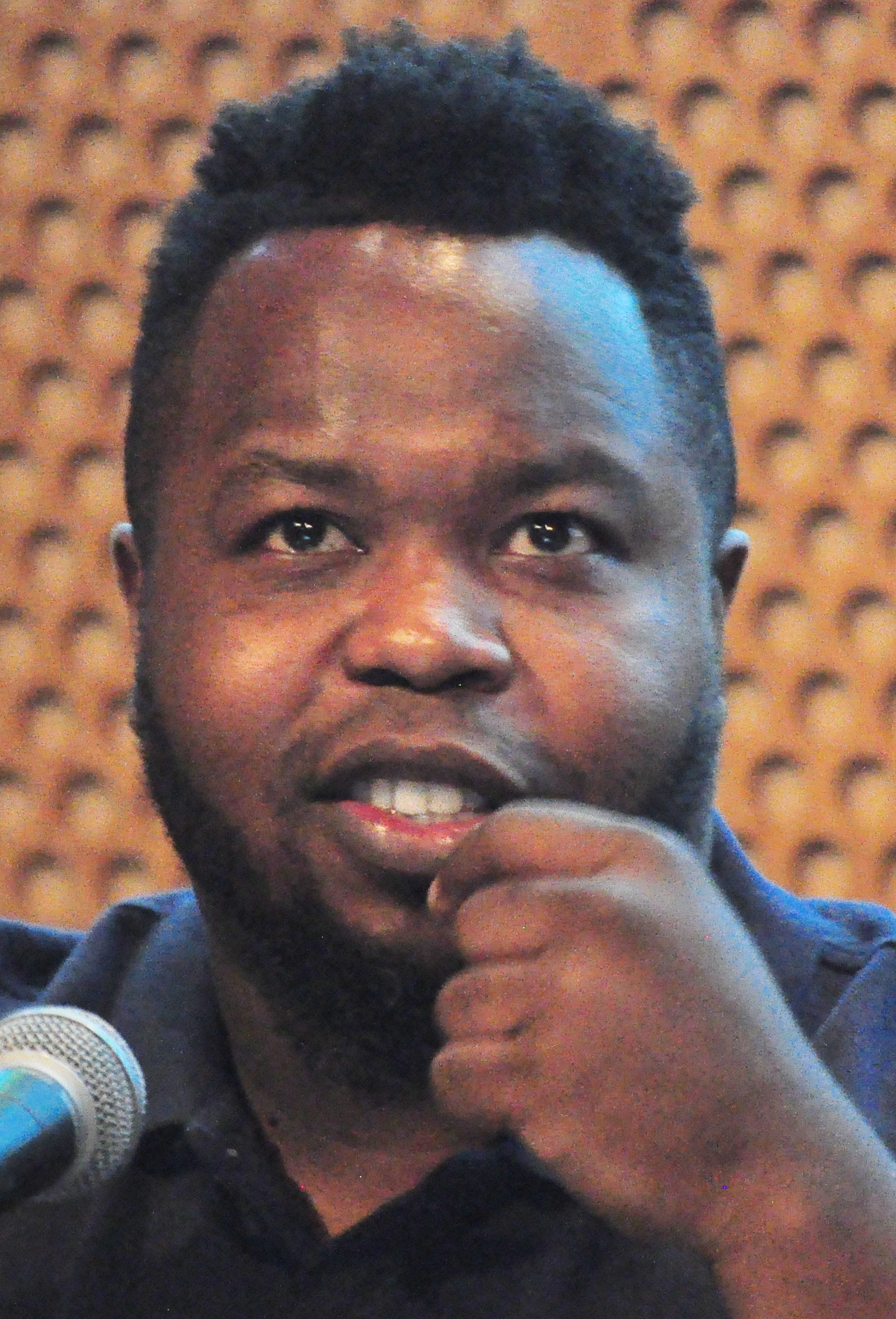
Ashon Crawley speaking at a conference in 2014.

Ashon T. Crawley is an American religious studies scholar, author, and multidisciplinary artist. He is a professor of religious studies and African American and African studies at the University of Virginia and the author of Blackpentecostal Breath: The Aesthetics of Possibility, on aesthetics and performance as modes of social imagination, and The Lonely Letters, an epistolary, semi-autobiographical work. The Lonely Letters won the 2021 Lambda Literary Award for Nonfiction and the Believer Book Award for Nonfiction. Crawley is working on a book about the Hammond organ’s historical role in Black church and social life.

== Education ==
Crawley earned a Bachelor of Arts from the University of Pennsylvania in 2003, then received a Master of Theological Studies from Emory University in 2007. In 2013, he completed his PhD at Duke University.

== Publications ==
- Blackpentecostal Breath: The Aesthetics of Possibility, published October 3, 2016 by Fordham University Press
- The Lonely Letters, published April 10, 2020 by Duke University Press

== Awards ==
Year	Award	Nominated work	Result	Ref.
2019	American Musicological Society Judy Tsou Critical Race Studies Award	Blackpentecostal Breath	Winner	
2020	Believer Book Award for Nonfiction	The Lonely Letters	Winner	
2021	Lambda Literary Award for Nonfiction	The Lonely Letters	Winner	
