= Manuel Acevedo =

Spanish painter

Manuel Acevedo (or Acebedo, 1744–1800) was a Spanish painter who was born in Madrid. He was a disciple of Jose Lopez, but by diligently copying the works of the best painters he soon surpassed his master. He painted historical and religious subjects, and was much employed in Madrid. Bermudez mentions a "John the Baptist" and a "St. Francis" by him in the chapel of the hospital of La Latina at Madrid. He died in 1800.
