= Fishtail, Montana =

- Unincorporated community
- Location within Montana Location within the United States
- Coordinates: 45°26′55″N 109°30′21″W
- Country: United States
- State: Montana
- County: Stillwater

Area
  - Total: 0.58 sq mi (1.50 km^{2})
  - Land: 0.58 sq mi (1.50 km^{2})
  - Water: 0 sq mi (0.00 km^{2})
- Elevation: 4,485 ft (1,367 m)

Population (2020)
  - Total: 67
  - Density: 115.9/sq mi (44.75/km^{2})
- Time zone: UTC-7 (Mountain (MST))
  - Summer (DST): UTC-6 (MDT)
- ZIP code: 59028
- Area code: 406
- GNIS feature ID: 2806666

Fishtail is a small unincorporated community in Stillwater County, Montana, United States. As of the 2020 census, Fishtail had a population of 67. It is located on the West Rosebud River. Its post office was established on February 15, 1901, with Charles Sullivan as its first postmaster. It has a zip code of 59028.

== History ==
The community of Fishtail was established in 1892. It was platted in 1913.

Fishtail was affected by the 2022 Montana floods when the Stillwater River flooded.

== Demographics ==
Historical population
Census	Pop.	Note	%±
2020	67		—
U.S. Decennial Census

== Media ==
The Stillwater County News is a newspaper serving the area. It is printed weekly and also available online.

The town receives radio and television from the wider Billings area.
