= List of Vietnamese artists =

This is a list of artists who were born in the Vietnam, or whose artworks are closely associated with that country.

Artists are listed by field of study, and then by family name in alphabetical order (review Vietnamese naming customs as the family name will display in the first name field, with exceptions including people of the diaspora), and they may be listed more than once on the list if they work in many fields of study.

== Art collectives ==
- Nha San Collective
- The Propeller Group

== Architects ==
- Hoàng Thúc Hào (born 1970), architect and vice president of the Vietnam Association of Architects
- Ngô Viết Thụ (1927–2000), architect and urbanist
- Nguyễn An (1381–1453), Vietnamese-born Chinese architect of the Ming dynasty and hydraulics specialist between the first and fifth decades of the 15th century
- Võ Trọng Nghĩa (born 1976), architect

== Painters ==
- Bàng Nhất Linh (born 1983), visual artist
- Dao Droste (born 1952), Vietnamese-born German sculptor, painter, and installation artist
- Đỗ Quang Em (1942–2021), painter
- Hoàng Hồng Cẩm (1959–2011), painter
- Jun Nguyen-Hatsushiba (born 1968), Japanese-Vietnamese video artist and drawer
- Nguyễn Huy An (born 1982), painter, sculptor, installation artist, performance artist
- Nguyễn Mạnh Hùng (born 1976), painter, sculptor, and installation artist
- Bernadette Phan (born 1966), painter and drawer
- Phạm Lực (born 1943), painter
- Trần Đông Lương (1925–1993), painter
- Trần Quang Hiếu (1938–1985), sketch and panel artist
- Trần Trọng Vũ (born 1964), painter
- Trương Tân (born 1963), painter
- Tú Duyên (1915–2012), folk art painter, and printmaker

=== Lacquer painters ===
- Bùi Hữu Hùng (born 1957), painter, known for lacquer painting
- Công Quốc Hà (born 1955), painter, known for lacquer painting
- Nguyẽ̂n Lam (born 1944), painter, known for lacquer painting
- Phan Kế An (1923–2018), painter and renowned lacquer artist
- Trương Công Tùng (born 1986), painter, known for lacquer painting

=== Silk painters ===
- Trần Văn Thọ (1917–2004), silk painter and watercolorist
- Vũ Giáng Hương (1930–2011), painter, known for silk paintings

== Photographers ==
- Đoàn Công Tính (born 1943), photographer for the People's Army of Vietnam
- Maika Elan (born 1986), photographer
- Dinh Q. Lê (born 1968), Vietnamese-born American photographer and multimedia artist
- Trần Tuấn Việt (born 1983), photographer
- Nick Ut (born 1951), Vietnamese-born American photojournalist

== Sculptors ==
- Dao Droste (born 1952), Vietnamese-born German sculptor, painter, and installation artist
- Điềm Phùng Thị (1920–2002), modernist sculptor
- Lê Hiền Minh (born 1979), Dó paper installations, sculptor
- Nguyen Huy An (born 1982), painter, sculptor, installation artist, performance artist
- Nguyen Phuong Linh (born 1985), conceptual artist, sculptor, installation artist, and video artist
- Nguyễn Thu Thủy (born 1971), mosaicist, and ceramist
- Thu Van Tran (born 1979), Vietnamese-born French sculptor and installation artist

== See also ==
- List of Vietnamese people
- List of Vietnamese women artists
