= Nguyen Art Foundation =

Non-governmental art organization in Vietnam

Nguyễn Art Foundation
- Established: 2018
- Location: 147 Street No.8, Nam Long Residential Area, District 7, Ho Chi Minh city and 2 Street No.5, Van Phuc Residential City, Thu Duc City, Ho Chi Minh city
- Founder: Quynh Nguyen
- Website: nguyenartfoundation.com

Nguyễn Art Foundation (NAF) is a non-profit art organization based in Vietnam, with two permanent locations at EMASI Nam Long and EMASI Van Phuc in Ho Chi Minh City. The Foundation organizes exhibitions, educational programs, and collaborative initiatives related to contemporary art in Vietnam. It facilitates artistic and intellectual engagement via its collection, research, and development projects.

NAF was founded in 2018 by art collector Quynh Nguyen and operates as a privately funded institution. It began as a public collection of contemporary Vietnamese art and later expanded to include works by regional and international artists. The Foundation collaborates with institutions such as EMASI Schools, Renaissance International School Saigon and others to organize exhibitions and community-based programs in Vietnam and abroad.

NAF is a member of the Southeast Asian Collector’s Circle, and a patron of CIMAM – the International Committee for Museums and Collections of Modern Art.

== Collection ==
The Foundation’s collection includes more than 1,000 works, primarily by artists from Vietnam and Southeast Asia. The holdings are divided into categories including wartime sketches, Painting & Drawing, Sculpture, Photography, Performance Art, Artist Book & Artist Writing, Installation, and Video Art & Artist Film. Works from the collection are shown in exhibitions, through institutional loans, and in educational displays.

== Exhibitions and Display ==
NAF presents exhibitions and permanent displays at EMASI Schools and Renaissance International School Saigon, with works from both the Foundation’s collection and other contributing artists. Curated by in-house and guest curators, the exhibitions are organized around themes such as Past & Present, Community & Compassion, Innovation & Dedication, and Distance, Nearby.

Selected exhibitions include In absence, presence (2024), curated by Bill Nguyen; The Oddball, The Rebel, and The Maverick (2024), curated by Uyen Le; In Stranger Lands: Cocoa’s Journeys To Asia (2024), curated by Caroline Ha Thuc; Rhyming Gestures (2023), curated by Thái Hà and Nhat Vo; White Noise (2023), curated by Van Do; No more, not yet (2023), curated by Bill Nguyen; Illuminated Curiosities (2022), curated by Ace Le and Duong Manh Hung; People, Victory and Life after the War (2021), curated by Gridthiya Gaweewong.

== Education and public programs ==
NAF develops education programs with schools, educators, and artists. Including workshops, talks, exhibition tours, and curriculum-based activities, these programs are designed to introduce contemporary art to students and the public, and in connection with the Foundation’s exhibitions and collection.

== Development Projects ==
The Foundation undertakes projects relating to art history, theory, and curatorial practice, including research and publication initiatives, residency collaborations, and support for emerging practitioners.

=== Interviews ===
NAF has produced an interview series with artists, curators, and cultural practitioners based in Vietnam.

Participants include Dinh Q. Le, Tuan Mami, Nguyen Trinh Thi, Tuan Andrew Nguyen, Truong Cong Tung, Phan Thao Nguyen, among others.

=== Publication ===
The Foundation works with writers, scholars, and institutions to produce publications on contemporary art. Recent titles include An Exercise in Resonance (2025), by kula Vietnam; White Noise: Three Parables + 1 (2024), by Alfonse Chiu; Signs and Signals from Vietnam (forthcoming), edited by Pamela N. Corey and Nora Taylor, co-published with NUS Press.

=== Community Building ===
NAF partners with other local and international organizations on residencies, symposia, and research initiatives. Selected collaborations include Lananh Chu’s artist residency with Gasworks (2025); Sensing Photography: Vietnam & Vectors of Global Photography Symposium hosted at Fulbright University Vietnam (2025); No Cai Bum Art Week – Da Nang & Hoi An (2024); The First Conference on Curating in Vietnam (2024); Lena Bui’s artist residency at Delfina Foundation (2023); No Cai Bum Art Week – Da Lat Dreamy (2022); Reed Island (Red River) Talk Series, IN:ACT 2022 (2022); A. Farm Residency, co-initiated with Sàn Art and MoT+++ (2018-2021).

== Reception ==
NAF has been covered by art and culture publications for its exhibitions and activities. In 2023, ArtReview Asia reviewed White Noise exhibition, describing it as “an exploration of trauma, subjectivity, and memory.” Tatler Asia listed NAF among notable independent art organizations in Ho Chi Minh City, citing its educational and curatorial programming. Vietcetera in 2020 described it as “one of Vietnam’s largest private collections of contemporary art.” Vietcetera in 2020 described it as “one of Vietnam’s largest private collections of contemporary art.” CIMAM noted its patron membership in 2023.
