= List of Vietnamese women artists =

This is a list of women artists who were born in the Vietnam or whose artworks are closely associated with that country.

== B ==
- Thi Bui (born 1975), Vietnamese-born American graphic novelist, illustrator

== C ==
- Tiffany Chung (born 1969), Vietnamese-born American multimedia and installation artist
- Cong Kim Hoa (born 1962), lacquer painter

== D ==
- Thuy Diep (born 1975), Vietnamese-born American fashion designer
- Dao Droste (born 1952), Vietnamese-born German sculptor, painter, and installation artist

== E ==
- Maika Elan (born 1986), photographer

== H ==
- Đặng Thị Minh Hạnh (born 1961), fashion designer
- Vũ Giáng Hương (1930–2011), painter, known for silk paintings

== K ==
- Lim Khim Katy (born 1978), painter, of Chinese-Cambodian and Vietnamese descent

== L ==
- Thao Lam, Vietnamese-born Canadian children's book illustrator, author

== M ==
- Lê Hiền Minh (born 1979), Dó paper installations, sculptor

== P ==
- Thảo Nguyên Phan (born 1987), painter, filmmaker, and installation artist
- LeUyen Pham (born 1973), children's book illustrator, author

== T ==
- Điềm Phùng Thị (1920–2002), modernist sculptor
- Nguyễn Thu Thủy (born 1971), mosaicist, and ceramist
- Thu Van Tran (born 1979), Vietnamese-born French sculptor and installation artist

== See also ==
- List of Vietnamese people
- List of Vietnamese artists
