= Việt Lê =

Vietnamese-American artist, academic, and curator

- Born: 1976 (age 49–50); Ho Chi Minh City, Vietnam
- Other name: Viet H. Le
- Education: University of Southern California, University of California, Irvine, California State University, Fullerton
- Occupations: artist, writer, curator, educator
- Years active: 1998–present
- Website: vietle.net

Việt Lê (born 1976) is a Vietnamese-born American artist, writer, and curator. Lê is an associate professor at the California College of the Arts.

He has been published in positions: Asia critique; Crab Orchard Review; American Quarterly; Amerasia Journal; Art Journal; and the anthologies Writing from the Perfume River; Strange Cargo; The Spaces Between Us; Modern and Contemporary Southeast Asian Art; among others.

== Biography ==
Việt Lê was born in 1976 in Ho Chi Minh City, Vietnam. Lê received his M.F.A. degree from the University of California, Irvine. He received his M.A. and Ph.D. from the University of Southern California. In Taipei, he was a postdoctoral fellow at Academia Sinica.

== Exhibitions ==
Solo art exhibitions include lovebang! (2016) at Kellogg University Art Gallery, Los Angeles; vestige (2015) at H Gallery, Bangkok; tan nÁRT cõi lòng | heARTbreak! (Nhà Sàn Collective Hà Nội). Lê has presented his work at The Banff Centre, Alberta, Canada; UCLA Hammer Museum, Los Angeles, USA; DoBaeBacSa Gallery, Seoul, Korea; Japan Foundation, Việt Nam; 1a Space, Hong Kong; Bangkok Art & Cultural Center (BACC), Thailand; Civitella Ranieri, Italy; Shanghai Biennale, China; Rio Gay Film Festival, Rio de Janeiro, Brazil; among other venues.

=== Solo exhibitions ===
2016

- lovebang!, February 27 - April 23, 2016, W. Keith and Janet Kellog University Art Gallery at California State University, Pomona, Pomona (two person solo exhibit with Laura Kina)
- tan nÁRT cõi lòng | heARTbreak! December 26, 2015 - January 3, 3016
  Nhà Sàn Collective Hà Nội, Việt Nam

2015

- vestige, H Gallery, Bangkok, Thailand December 14, 2013 - January 14, 2015

2012

- still December 10, 2011 - February 4, 2012
  California College of the Arts, San Francisco

2010

- boy bang! November 4–28, 2010
  Java Arts, Phnom Penh, Cambodia

2009

- succeed or quit June 8 - July 28, 2009
  site-specific installation, Umbria, Italy

2007

- what's love got to do with it? October 2007
  two-person solo exhibition with Julie Thi Underhill
  Creighton University Art Gallery, Omaha, NE

2004

- represent June 21 - July 3, 2004
  site-specific installation, The Banff Centre, Canada
- pictures of you April 9–17, 2004
  Hudson D. Walker Gallery, Provincetown, MA
- It's a Fine Day March 5, 2004
  solo performance, Shoshin Performance Space, NYU

2002

- sweet bitter August 11, 2002
  Solo performances by Việt Lê, Leo Garcia, LeVan D. Hawkins, Alex Penn
  Curated by LeVan D. Hawkins, Highways Performance Space, SantaMonica, CA

2001

- the indifference of every day September - December 2001
  multimedia installation of digital images and text in a public space Cyber A, University of California, Irvine

2000

- hom(m)e July 2000 - January 2001
  site-specific installation Pillsbury Madison & Winthrop LLP, corporate office, Costa Mesa, California

1998

- Masquerade: A Solo Exhibition January 27 - February 14, 1998
  Sight and Sound Gallery, California State University, Fullerton, California

=== Experimental Films ===
lovebang! trilogy 2012-17

- lovebang! 2016, directed by Việt Lê. Collaborators: Chean Long, Khvay Samnang, GiGi.
- eclipse, 2016, directed by Việt Lê with Jamie Maxtone-Graham. Collaborators: Nguyen Phuong Linh, Tuan Mami, Anh Phong Le. Producer: Nguyễn Quốc Thành.
- heARTbreak! 2016–17. Producer: Henry Tan.
  - Select Film Festival Official Selection: Future Shorts Film Fest '12, Sài Gòn, Việt Nam; CAAMFest '12, San Francisco; Frameline LGBT Film Festival '13; San Francisco Global Vietnamese Film Fest '13; MIX New York Experimental Queer Film Fest '13, New York; Southwest Gay & Lesbian Film Fest, Alburquerbue New Mexico '13; Queer Arts Festival '13, Hà Noi, Việt Nam; Rio Gay Film Fest 2014, Rio de Janeiro, Brazil; Queer Rebels Exploding Lineage Film Fest, SF '14
  - Select Gallery Exhibitions/ Presentations: Bangkok Art & Culture Centre | The Art Centre, Chulalongkorn University, Bangkok, Thailand; Department of Avant Garde Cliches, Manila, Philippines; Meta House, Phnom Penh, Cambodia; Aljira A Center for the Arts; Boston, USA; Los Angeles, USA; Lanchester Gallery, Coventry, UK; Taipei, Taiwan; College Art Association, New York; USA Sonic Tonics: Spiritual Asias (working title) 2017- (feature film trilogy in-process)

=== Group exhibitions ===
2017

- Waiting With performance. Invited collaborative performance with Faith Wilding.
  Northern California Women's Art Caucus, San Francisco, USA. January 17, 2017

2016

- APAture Festival Featured Artist: October 9, 2016
  Việt Lê | Film Showcase, Koret Auditorium, SF Main Public Library, San Francisco, CA, USA
- Imaginary Selves February 2-March 10, 2016
  Guest curated by Jennifer Vanderpool, Ph.D.
  Harris Gallery, University of La Verne, 1950 Third Street, La Verne, California 91750

2015

- Queer Rebels Fest! (eclipse screened) May 29–30, 2015
  African American Art & Culture Complex, San Francisco

2014

- forever queer! Dec. 20, 2013-January 5, 2014
  Nha San Collective, Hả Nội, Việt Nam, curated by Nguyễn Quốc Thành

2013

- "Queer Rebels" Program (love bang! screened) November 2013
  Mix New York Queer Experimental Film Festival
  curated by Celeste Chan and Kali Boyce
- Southwest Gay & Lesbian Film Festival October 11–20, 2013
  (love bang! screened) Albuquerque, New Mexico
- "Transtastic" film shorts program (love bang! screened) June 24, 2013
  Frameline LGBT Film Festival. San Francisco, CA
- Sex. Money. Race. Gender: The Ladydrawers (of Ill.) June 27-July 27, 2013
  Exhibition & Workshop Series
  A+D Gallery, Chicago, Illinois
  curated by Anne Elizabeth Moore
- boi band poster workshop with Việt Lê & Morgan Claire, Residency Workshop Series July 25, 2013
- Asian American Festival Favorites (love bang! screened) April 30, 2013
  OVEE TV, national platform
  curated by Kar Yin Tham, Center for Asian American Media (CAAM) featuring Lobster Shmobster (Dave Quion & Kyle Ross /USA/2 minutes/2004); The Others (Aram Siu Wai Collier/USA/9 minutes/2009); love bang! (Việt Lê/Cambodia-USA/6 minutes/2012); Lady Razorbacks (Laura Green/USA/4 minutes/2011); The Postcard (Josh Kim/South Korea/15minutes/2007)
- Vietnamese Global Film Festival April 27–28, 2013
  Roxie Theater, San Francisco
  Organized by the Diasporic Vietnamese Artists Network (DVAN)

== Fellowships ==
Lê has received fellowships from Fulbright-Hays (Việt Nam), William Joiner Center (US), Civitella Ranieri Foundation (Italy), Fine Arts Work Center (US), Center for Khmer Studies (Cambodia), Art Matters Foundation, International Institute for Asian Studies (Leiden University, the Netherlands), Camargo Foundation (Cassis, France), and PEN Center USA.

== Curatorial ==
Lê co-curated, Miss Saigon with the Wind (2005) at Highways Performance Space, Santa Monica; and Charlie Don’t Surf! (2005) at Centre A, Vancouver, British Columbia; and he co-curated with Leta Ming and Yong Soon Min (2008), humor us at Los Angeles Municipal Art Gallery, Los Angeles; transPOP: Korea Việt Nam Remix (2008–2009) with Yong Soon Min traveling in Seoul, Saigon, Irvine, and San Francisco; the 2012 Taipei Kuandu Biennale, and Love in the Time of War (UC Santa Barbara and SF Camerawork), which features special online-only projects. He co-organized the 2015 Artistic Interventions: Histories, Cartographies in Asia conference (Ph.D. workshops and symposium) in Hong Kong.

== Writing ==
He has co-edited special issues of Asian American Literary Review ([Re]Collecting Vietnam, 2015), BOL Journal (Việt Nam and Us, 2008) and Reflections: A Journal of Writing, Service Learning, and Community Literacy (Syracuse University Press, 2008). Lê has also coedited with Professor Lan Duong a special issue of Visual Anthropology (Routledge, forthcoming). He is a reviews co-editor (with Prof. Laura Kina) of Asian Diasporic Visual Cultures and the Americas (ADVA) (Brill). He was a nominated finalist for the 2009 Sovereign Art Foundation Art Prize (Hong Kong). His poetry collection was a 2013 Crab Orchard Review First Book Award Semi-Finalist.

He received the inaugural Prudential Eye Prize for Best Writing on Asian Contemporary Art in 2015
