= Kiang Malingue =

Commercial art gallery in Hong Kong and Shanghai

Coordinates: 22.2802°N 114.1577°E

Kiang Malingue is a commercial art gallery with premises in Hong Kong and New York City. It was founded by Edouard Malingue and Lorraine Kiang Malingue as the Edouard Malingue Gallery in 2010. The establishment combines different disciplines, ranging from video and installation to painting and sound, and also actively works with international institutions and curators to present off-site artistic projects and exhibitions.

== Background ==
Since 2010, as Kiang Malingue (previously Edouard Malingue Gallery), the institution has produced over a hundred exhibitions in Hong Kong, Shanghai, Beijing, and internationally. Some solo exhibitions in recent years have included Kwan Sheung Chi's "Not retrospective" in 2024, Wong Ping's "anus whisper", also in 2024, Apichatpong Weerasethakul's "A Planet of Silence, Selected Works from 2021–2022" in 2023, Zheng Bo's "Beech, Pine, Fern, Acacia" in 2023, Brook Hsu's "Oranges, Clementines and Tangerines" in 2022, Chou Yu-Cheng's "Sedimentary Gradient" in 2022, Yeung Hok Tak's "What a big smoke ring" in 2022, Nabuqi's "Ghost, Skin, Dwelling" in 2021, Yang Chi-Chuan's "Plastonki" in 2021, Yu Ji's "Forager" in 2020, Günther Förg's "1986 – 1992" in 2020, Ko Sin Tung's "Adaption" in 2019, "R for Rhombicuboctahedron" in 2019, the eighth volume of Ho Tzu Nyen's series "The Critical Dictionary of Southeast Asia", "The highway is like a lion's mouth" by Samson Young in 2018, Wong Ping's "Who's the Daddy" in 2017, "Refresh, Sacrifice, New Hygiene, Infection, Clean, Robot, Air, Housekeeping, www.ayibang.com, Cigarette, Dyson, Modern People" by Chou Yu-cheng in 2017, among others.

Kiang Malingue has participated in art fairs, including Art Basel, Art Basel Hong Kong, Art Basel Miami Beach, Art Basel Paris, Frieze London, Frieze Seoul, West Bund Art & Design, and FOG Design+Art. It also organizes public talks.

== Artists ==
The gallery represents a variety of international artists, including:

- Cho Yong-ik
- Apichatpong Weerasethakul
- Ellen Pau
- Chou Yu-cheng
- Ho Tzu Nyen
- Samson Young
- Su-Mei Tse
- Truong Cong Tung
- Tiffany Chung
- Tromarama
- Ying Miao
- Carrie Yamaoka

== Space ==
The gallery's first space opened in 2010 and was designed by the Office for Metropolitan Architecture Asia (Hong Kong), led by the architect Rem Koolhaas. In January 2015, the gallery expanded twice in size and moved to a new space, occupying an entire floor, designed by the Hong Kong–based firm BEAU Architects. In October 2022, Kiang Malingue announced the opening of its new headquarters at 10 Sik On Street, Wan Chai. In May 2025, Kiang Malingue expanded internationally with the opening of a new space at 50 Eldridge Street in New York City's Lower East Side.
