= Bàng Nhất Linh =

Vietnamese artist (born 1983)

- Born: 1983 (age 42–43); Hanoi, Vietnam
- Occupation: Contemporary artist

Bàng Nhất Linh (born 1983) is a Vietnamese contemporary artist based in Hanoi. His works are usually simple but multi-layered, dreamy and humane. They reflect the surveys into the depths of the psychological spaces, memories, history, submerged and of the oblivion in which "war memorabilia are removed from their original contexts to be placed within another context, or positioned in a relationship with human as communicable and interactive objects.

== Life ==
Bàng Nhất Linh is also well known as a collector of war memorabilia. He was born in Kham Thien, Hanoi - a special place in the Vietnam War, which has inspired his interest and tie with historical events. Linh became a visual artist after graduating from Vietnam University of Fine Arts in 2005. In 2014, he was featured, among 8 other artists like Nguyen Phuong Linh, Nguyen Huy An ... in a book that examines Vietnamese art scene and outstanding Vietnamese local artists born in the 1980s. : "Art and Talents" as "having a unique artistic identity, different from other colleagues of his generation ...".

== Works ==
=== Dust, bikes and dim streets (2009) ===
The artwork featured in this exhibition is an interactive installation in which the viewer contributes to the work by coloring the miniature of 100 turtle towers - the symbol of Hanoi.

=== Le temps perdu (2010) ===
The exhibition, contains artworks made with paddy rice, takes place at L'Espace, the French cultural center in Hanoi. One of the artwork is a car covered completely by paddy rice

=== Under the river (2010–2012) ===
The biggest project in terms of physical size of Linh. It was inspired by a famous naval battle in the history of Vietnam - the Battle of Bạch Đằng. The work was built after a model of Chinese naval battleship in Han Dynasty era hanging on wooden stakes. However, the artwork was not exhibited, and the project was canceled due to censorship.

=== Born in 1983 / Kham Thien (2013) ===
This installation and video exhibition is about the war through the eyes of the North Vietnamese people. It consists of everyday objects that are thought to be familiar and simple but are made by soldiers from war material such as ammunition. An installation occupies a large wall made of poems written in the Vietnam War period.

=== The vacant chair (2013–2015) ===
Linh's most well-known project, oversea. A video installation with two men who were soldiers on two war fronts during the Vietnam War. They cut each other's hair in a barber chair made from the Mig21 fighter seat. The music used in the piece is "The Vacant Chair," a famous American Civil War song composed by George F. Root in 1861 on the inspiration of Henry S. Washburn's poem.

== Exhibitions ==
Linh developed his career with all his projects as solo exhibitions in Vietnam, except for a number of group exhibitions oversea such as Mien Meo Mieng - Vietnam Contemporary Art in Bildmuseet or Sunshower - Contemporary Art from Southeast Asia. Asia from 1980s now "- a comprehensive exhibition and contemporary art system in the region co-organized by Mori Art Museum, The National Art Center, Tokyo and Japan Foundation Center. Along with Tran Luong, Linh is also one of two Vietnamese artists chosen by the Fukuoka Asian Art Museum in Sunshower - a shortened version.

== Publication ==
- 2017 'SUNSHOWER: Contemporary Art from Southeast Asia 1980s to Now' (Edited and published by Heibonsha Publisher, The National Art Center Tokyo, The Mori Art Museum, and the Japan Foundation Asia Center)
- 2016 'Vietnam Eye' - Vietnam contemporary art (Skira Publisher)
- 2015 'Mien Meo Mieng - Vietnam Contemporary Art' (Published by Bildmuseer-Sweden)
- 2014 'Art & Talent: a foreground on the 8X contemporary artists of Vietnam and nine typical artists' (Vietnam Women Publisher)
