= The Propeller Group =

Cross-disciplinary media arts collective

- Founded: 2006
- Founders: Phunam Thuc Ha; Matt Lucero; Tuan Andrew Nguyen
- Headquarters: Ho Chi Minh City, Vietnam; Los Angeles, California, United States
- Website: www.the-propeller-group.com teepeegee.com

The Propeller Group is a cross-disciplinary structure for creating art projects. The collective is headquartered in Ho Chi Minh City, Vietnam and works in conjunction with creative individuals in Los Angeles, California, United States.

== About ==
The Propeller Group was founded in late 2006 by visual artists Phunam Thuc Ha (born 1974, Ho Chi Minh City, Vietnam) and Tuan Andrew Nguyen (born 1976, Ho Chi Minh City, Vietnam), who were joined by Matt Lucero (born 1976, Upland, California) in 2008. Phunam studied sculpture and conservation in Bangkok and Chiang Mai, Thailand and at the Hanoi College of Fine Arts. Nguyen earned a BFA from the University of California, Irvine. He met Lucero while they were completing their MFA from the California Institute of the Arts. Lucero earned a BFA from the University of California, Riverside. As of late 2017, Phunam Thuc Ha and Matt Lucero are no longer active members of The Propeller Group having withdrawn to pursue more personal interests. Tuan Andrew Nguyen continues to work with the group. Whereas his own practice focuses on 'memory and its potential for political resistance', Nguyen's work with The Propeller Group explores 'the memory of the Cold War and its residual effects on how we perceive and how we relate to one another in the present day'.

The collective is dedicated to developing original creative content, bridging between fine art and mainstream media. The group draws inspiration from television, film, video, and the Internet. They make large-scale collaborative projects in new media, from online viral campaigns, international film productions, television commercials, to art installations, and everything in between, taking a special interest in multimedia and mass communication. The collective employs strategies from advertising, marketing, and the rarefied forms of commodity exchange and display that take place in galleries and museums. Their medium and Vietnam are frequently their subjects. They use mass media as a platform to combine seemingly contradictory phenomena: advertising and politics, history and future, and public and private. They often push their work back into the public sphere, using commodities as a form of public art. The collective cites graffiti as a source of influence, as seen in their documentary Spray It Don't Say It (2006), which follows the evolution of graffiti in Vietnam. The influence of graffiti is also present in Television Commercial for Communism (2011), drawing inspiration from the COST REVS tag, which mixes identity with advertising and branding and takes advantage of the public space.

=== TPG Films ===
TPG Films, The Propeller Group's second identity, functions as a full-service video production company.

The Propeller Group also functions as the full-service video production company TPG Films. In addition to making music videos for Vietnamese pop singers Thanh Bui, Hoàng Thùy Linh, Minh Hằng, Hồ Ngọc Hà, Phương Vy, Anh Khang, Liêu Anh Tuấn, and the occasional commercials, TPG Films has collaborated with Vietnamese American artist Dinh Q. Lê on multimedia installation projects. They also regularly team up with Danish art collective Superflex, co-producing short films and video installations. The distinction between The Propeller Group and TPG Films reflects the shifting relations between art and commerce.

Phunam and Nguyen also co-founded the artist-run, non-profit, alternative space Sàn Art (Ho Chi Minh City) along with Dinh Q. Lê and Tiffany Chung in 2007.

== Works ==
Their works have been described as a blend of aesthetics and culture, between fine arts and mainstream media, between art gallery and the media world, between high culture and low culture, with an interdisciplinary and border-crossing appeal, a fusion of two seemingly different concepts and ideologies, such as the blend of the tool of capitalism (advertising) and ideology of communism in their project Television Commercial for Communism. According to the Guggenheim Museum, "To appreciate the Propeller Group’s work is to enter an extended network of aesthetic and cultural production." The Propeller Group has been the subject of solo exhibitions at galleries and museums worldwide. Their work has been included in No Country: Contemporary Art for South and Southeast Asia at the Solomon R. Guggenheim Museum, New York and The Ungovernables, New Museum Triennial. The collective, under the identity TPG, has also exhibited at Museum of Modern Art, Hammer Museum, San Francisco Museum of Modern Art, Lombard Freid Gallery, Guangzhou Triennial, and Singapore Art Museum.

=== Films ===
- Spray It Don't Say It (2006) – documentary film
- She Sells Seashells (2007) – short film, in collaboration with The Seashores
- Burning Car (2008) – short film, in collaboration with Superflex
- Flooded McDonald’s (2008) – short film, in collaboration with Superflex
- The Financial Crisis (2009) – video clips for television broadcast, in collaboration with Superflex
- Porcelain / Mảnh Ghép Cuộc Đời (2009) – three-part television mini-series, in collaboration with Superflex
- FADE IN: EXT. STORAGE – CU CHI – DAY (2010) – short film, in collaboration with Superflex
- The Guerillas of Cu Chi (2012) – short film
- Light and Belief (2012) – short documentary film, with Dinh Q. Lê
- The Living Need Light, The Dead Need Music (2014) – short film

=== Video art ===
- The Farmers and the Helicopters (2006) (in collaboration with Dinh Q. Lê)
- Uh (2007)
- From Father to Son (2007) (in collaboration with Dinh Q. Lê)
- South China Sea Pishkun (2009) (in collaboration with Dinh Q. Lê)
- Modern Times Forever (2011) (in collaboration with Superflex)
- Erasure (2011) (in collaboration with Dinh Q. Lê)
- Television Commercial for Communism (2011)

=== Interdisciplinary projects ===
- Temporary Public Gallery (2010): Renting out advertising space to curate artworks in public, the group attempts to challenge notions of public space, advertising, and public art in Vietnam as there are limitations of the public art due to control through different censorship bodies.
- Estranged Fruit (2011): A study in the application of political history and socio-political meaning through the introduction of one of America’s most famous protest song, Strange Fruit, into China’s growing rock scene, via Chinese punk rock & industrial metal band, VooDooKungFu. Estranged Fruit was displayed in its first iteration in Hong Kong at 1A Space as an installation.
- Vietnam the World Tour (2010–2012): A rogue anti-nation-rebranding campaign. It appropriates marketing language, graffiti strategies, and viral video platforms to re-associate a historically colonized and mediated national identity with an entirely new mediated history.
- Static Friction: Burning Rubber (2012): An attempt to discuss the larger issues of globalism, economy, industry, individuality, rebellion, violence and aesthetics with one simple act: the burnout. Single channel video, modified Honda Wave, photographs.
- Static Friction (2012): A five-part work, including 1967, Collision, The Dream, Portraits of Mechanical Reproduction, and Chasing Inertia.
- The History of the Future (2012): A two-part mold is shown in the gallery space along with an accompanying short film showing a series of packshots, inter-cut with a short documentary narrative of the artists’ journey to an unknown location to bury the sculpture. The GPS coordinates are kept in a steel safe rigged with a time-release mechanism, attached to a digital counter, counting down from 100 years, only to be unlocked when the counter reaches zero.

== Selected exhibitions and screenings ==
No.	Title	Year	Location
1	6th NHK Asian Film Festival	2007	Tokyo, Japan
2	The History of a Decade That Has Not Yet Been Named Lyon Biennial	2008	Lyon, France
3	Strategies from Within: Vietnamese and Cambodian Contemporary Art	2008	Ke Center, Shanghai, China
4	Farewell to Post-Colonialism 3rd Guangzhou Triennial	2008	Guangdong Museum of Art, Guangzhou, China
5	Quiet Shiny Words	2008	Galerie Quynh, Ho Chi Minh City, Vietnam
6	4th Biennial Cinema Symposium	2008	Los Angeles, CA, USA
7	Gwangju Biennale	2008	Gwangju, Korea
8	The Farmers and the Helicopters	2008	Freer & Sackler Gallery, Smithsonian Institution, Washington D.C., USA
9	Oberhausen Film Festival	2009	Germany
10	Palais Project	2009	Vienna, Austria
11	Intersection Vietnam	2009	Valentine Willie Fine Arts, Kuala Lumpur, Malaysia
12	Against Easy Listening	2010	1A Space, Hong Kong
13	Your Name Here (in collaboration with Tyke Witnes)	2010	Sàn Art at L’usine, Ho Chi Minh City, Vietnam
14	The Farmers and the Helicopters	2010	Museum of Modern Art, New York, NY, USA
15	FAX	2010	Para Site, Hong Kong
16	Video, an Art, a History	2011	Singapore Art Museum, Singapore
17	Project 35 Independent Curators International	2011	Pratt Manhattan Gallery, NY, USA
18	Commercial Break 54th Venice Biennale (presented by Garage Center for Contemporary Culture, Garage Projects)	2011	Venice, Italy
19	Negotiating Home, History and Nation	2011	Singapore Art Museum, Singapore
20	Singapore Biennale 2011 Open House	2011	Singapore Art Museum, Singapore
21	The Ungovernables: 2012 New Museum Triennial	2012	New Museum, NY, USA
22	Made in L.A. 2012 Los Angeles Biennial	2012	Hammer Museum, Los Angeles, CA, USA
23	The Unseen 4th Guangzhou Triennial	2012	Guangdong Museum of Art, Guangzhou, China
24	Six Lines of Flight	2012	San Francisco Museum of Modern Art, San Francisco, CA, USA
25	No Country: Contemporary Art for South and Southeast Asia Solomon R. Guggenheim Foundation, Guggenheim UBS MAP Global Art Initiative	2013	Solomon R. Guggenheim Museum, New York, NY, USA
26	Lived, Lives, Will Live!	2013	Lombard Freid Gallery, New York, NY, USA
27	Lenin Piece Art Basel – Hong Kong	2014	Hong Kong
28	All the World’s Futures 56th Venice Biennale	2015	Venice, Italy
29	The Living Need Light, The Dead Need Music	2016	James Cohan Gallery, New York, NY, USA
30	Is It an Art Collective or a Vietnamese Ad Agency? Yes and Yes	2018	New York, NY, USA
31	The Picture Will Still Exist	2017	MoT+++, Ho Chi Minh City, Vietnam

== See also ==
- List of Vietnamese artists
- Video art
- New media art
- Multimedia art
- Contemporary art
- Pop art
