= Tromarama =

Indonesian art collective

Tromarama (est. 2006, Bandung) is an Indonesian art collective founded by Febie Babyrose (b. 1985, Jakarta), Ruddy Hatumena (b. 1984, Bahrain) and Herbert Hans (b. 1984, Jakarta).

== Biography ==
Graduates of Institut Teknologi of Bandung, Babyrose, Hatumena and Hans met in a music video workshop where they conceived ‘Serigala Militia’ (2006) for Seringai's track of the same title and established Tromarama, referencing the “traumatic” experience of making hundreds of woodcut plywood boards.

Since then, Tromarama's work has been exhibited at Open Eye Gallery (Liverpool, 2016), the Gwangju Biennale (2016), Frankfurter Kunstverein (Frankfurt am Main, 2015), the Stedelijk Museum (Amsterdam, 2015), National Gallery of Victoria (Melbourne, 2015) and Mori Art Museum (Japan, 2010) amongst other locations.

== Work ==
Engaging with the notion of hyperreality in the digital age, Tromarama specialises in developing inventive responses to contemporary urban culture spanning multiple media – from stop motion animation and video art to installations and lenticular prints. Fleshing out the element of play and humour in everyday life, each work infuses the ordinary with novel means of contemplation in the context of urban Asian cultural environment and political reverberations.

In 2016, Tromarama's installation ‘’Private Riots’ (2014–2016) – a monumental structure composed of flash sequence video and protest banners – was selected for the Encounters section of Art Basel Hong Kong curated by Alexie Glass-Kantor. Other notable solo exhibitions in recent years include its debut in the UK (2016) curated by Ying Tan in collaboration with Edouard Malingue Gallery and Open Eye Gallery as part of the Liverpool Biennial fringe programme and ‘Panoramix’ (2015) at Edouard Malingue Gallery in Hong Kong.
