= Cong Kim Hoa =

Vietnamese artist

Công Kim Hoa
- Born: Công Kim Hoa; 1962 (age 63–64); Hanoi, Vietnam

Công Kim Hoa (born 1962 in Hanoi) is a Vietnamese painter who is known for her lacquer painting. She graduated from the Hanoi College of Fine Art in 1985.

Hoa comes from an artistic family. Her parents are Cong Ton Toan and Dinh Thi Lieu. Her brother Công Quốc Hà is also a lacquer painter.
