= Thảo Nguyên Phan =

Vietnamese multimedia artist

- Born: 1987 (age 38–39)
- Education: University of Fine Arts (2008); Lasalle College of the Arts (2009); School of the Art Institute of Chicago (2014)
- Occupation: Visual multimedia artist
- Website: thaonguyenphan.com

Thảo Nguyên Phan (born 1987) is a Vietnamese visual multimedia artist whose practice encompasses painting, filmmaking, and installation. She currently lives and works in Ho Chi Minh City and has exhibited widely in Vietnam and abroad. Drawing inspiration from both official and unofficial histories, Phan references her country's turbulent past while observing ambiguous issues in social convention, history, and tradition. She has exhibited in solo and group exhibitions in Vietnam and abroad, at many public institutions, including the Factory Contemporary Art Centre, Ho Chi Minh City; Nha San Collective, Hanoi; Rockbund Art Museum, Shanghai; Times Art Center in Berlin, Timișoara; and the Mistake Room, Los Angeles.

She has won numerous awards throughout her career, and she is also a founding member of Art Labor (est. 2012) with artist Trương Công Tùng and curator Arlette Quỳnh-Anh Trần, a cross-disciplinary collective that develops art projects with the aim of benefiting the local community. In collaboration with independent art space Sàn Art in Ho Chi Minh, Art Labor hosts educational workshops that explore visual arts and the life sciences, examining shared cultural histories in the region through guest lectures and an artist-in-residency program.

== Education ==
Thảo Nguyên Phan graduated from Ho Chi Minh City University of Fine Arts in 2008. The following year, she received a Bachelor of Fine Arts with First Class honors from Singapore's Lasalle College of the Arts and completed an MFA in Painting and Drawing from the School of the Art Institute of Chicago (SAIC) in 2014.

== Awards and residencies ==
Phan is a 2018 recipient of the Han Nefkens Foundation – LOOP Barcelona Video Art Production Award. The Han Nefkens Foundation has supported the production and presentation of Becoming Alluvium (2019), an installation of video and painting, to be shown at the Fundació Joan Miró, Barcelona (2019–20), WIELS Contemporary Art Centre, Brussels (2020), and Chisenhale Gallery, London (2020). Phan was also one of four finalists for the Hugo Boss Asia Art Award 2019, alongside Eisa Jocson, Hao Jingban and Hsu Che-Yu, and was a 2016–2017 Rolex Protégé for Visual Arts, mentored by internationally acclaimed, New York-based performance and video artist Joan Jonas.

Phan was one of four special mentions of the Sharjah Biennale 14 prize, Sharjah, UAE, in 2019. In 2018, she was awarded the Grand Prize, APB Foundation Signature Art Prize, National Museum of Singapore. Further awards and residencies include an NTU CCA Residency, NTU Center for Contemporary Art, Singapore, 2017; Visual Arts Workshop in Botín Foundation, led by Joan Jonas, Santander, Spain, 2016; CDEF Grant, 2014; San Art Laboratory Artist in Residency program, San Art, Ho Chi Minh City, Vietnam, 2013; Incentive Scholarship, School of the Art Institute of Chicago and a nomination for the Dedalus foundation grant, in 2012; Presidential Scholarship at the School of the Art Institute of Chicago in 2012; Incentive Scholarship, School of the Art Institute of Chicago and first place, general category, Union League Civic & Arts foundation, Chicago in 2011.

== Partial list of exhibitions ==
Solo

- Poetic Amnesia, Curated by Zoe Butt, the Factory Contemporary Art Centre, Ho Chi Minh City, Vietnam and Nha San Collective, Hanoi, Vietnam (2017)
- Poetic Amnesia, Rolex Arts Weekend, Gemäldegalerie, Berlin, Germany (2018)
- Becoming Alluvium, Han Nefkens Art Foundation - Loop Barcelona video art award, Fundació Joan Miró, Barcelona, Spain (2019)
- Monsoon Melody, Han Nefkens Art Foundation and WIELS, Contemporary Art Centre, Brussels, Belgium (2020)

Group

- Open Edit: Mobile library, in collaboration with Truong Cong Tung, San Art, and Asia Art Archive, Ho Chi Minh City, Vietnam (2011)
- Riverscapes in Flux, travelling exhibition to Vietnam, Thailand, Cambodia, Indonesia, and Philippines, organized by the Goethe Institute, Hanoi, Vietnam (2013)
- Right Fiction, San Art, Ho Chi Minh City, Vietnam (2013)
- Modern Love, Institute of Contemporary Arts Singapore, curated by Bala Starr and Khairuddin Hori (2014)
- Vietnam Now: Changing Society, at the Canvas International Art, Amsterdam (2014)
- Embedded South(s), online exhibition of moving images sponsored by San Art and the Prince Claus fund (2016)
- Anywhere but Here, Betonsalon, Paris, France (2016)
- Constructing Mythologies, Edouard Malingue Gallery, Hong Kong (2018)
- A Beast, a God and a Line, at Dhaka Art Summit, Bangladesh, Para Site, Hong Kong, and the Museum of Contemporary Art, Warsaw (2018)
- Relics, Jendela visual arts space, Esplanade, Singapore (2018)
- Where Water Comes Together with Other Water, Lyon Biennale, Lyon, France (2019)
- Where The Sea Remembers, The Mistake Room, Los Angeles, USA (2019)
- Journey beyond the arrow, Sharjah Art Biennial 14: "Leaving the Echo Chamber", curated by Zoe Butt (2019)

== Publications ==
Thảo Nguyên Phan's first monograph, Monsoon Melody, was co-published by exhibition partners Fundació Joan Miró, Barcelona, WIELS, Brussels, and the Chisenhale Gallery, London; the Han Nefkens Foundation; and Mousse Publishing. The publication was edited with the support of Galerie Zink Waldkirchen, with texts by Zoë Gray, Sam I-Shan, Lila Matsumoto, Han Nefkens, Pamela Nguyen Corey, Thảo Nguyên Phan, Hilde Teerlinck, and Thomas D. Trummer. The book mirrors Phan's interest in philosophy and literature, featuring stills from her films and texts that provide insight into her latest work. Phan has also released an artist book, Thảo Nguyên Phan: Voyages de Rhodes, which replicates the watercolors she painted directly onto the pages of Jesuit Missionary Alexandre de Rhodes' book, which chronicles his initial discoveries in Vietnam (1591–1660), and produced an exhibition catalogue for her exhibition Poetic Amnesia.
