= Renaissance International School Saigon =

Coordinates: 10.7381°N 106.7243°E

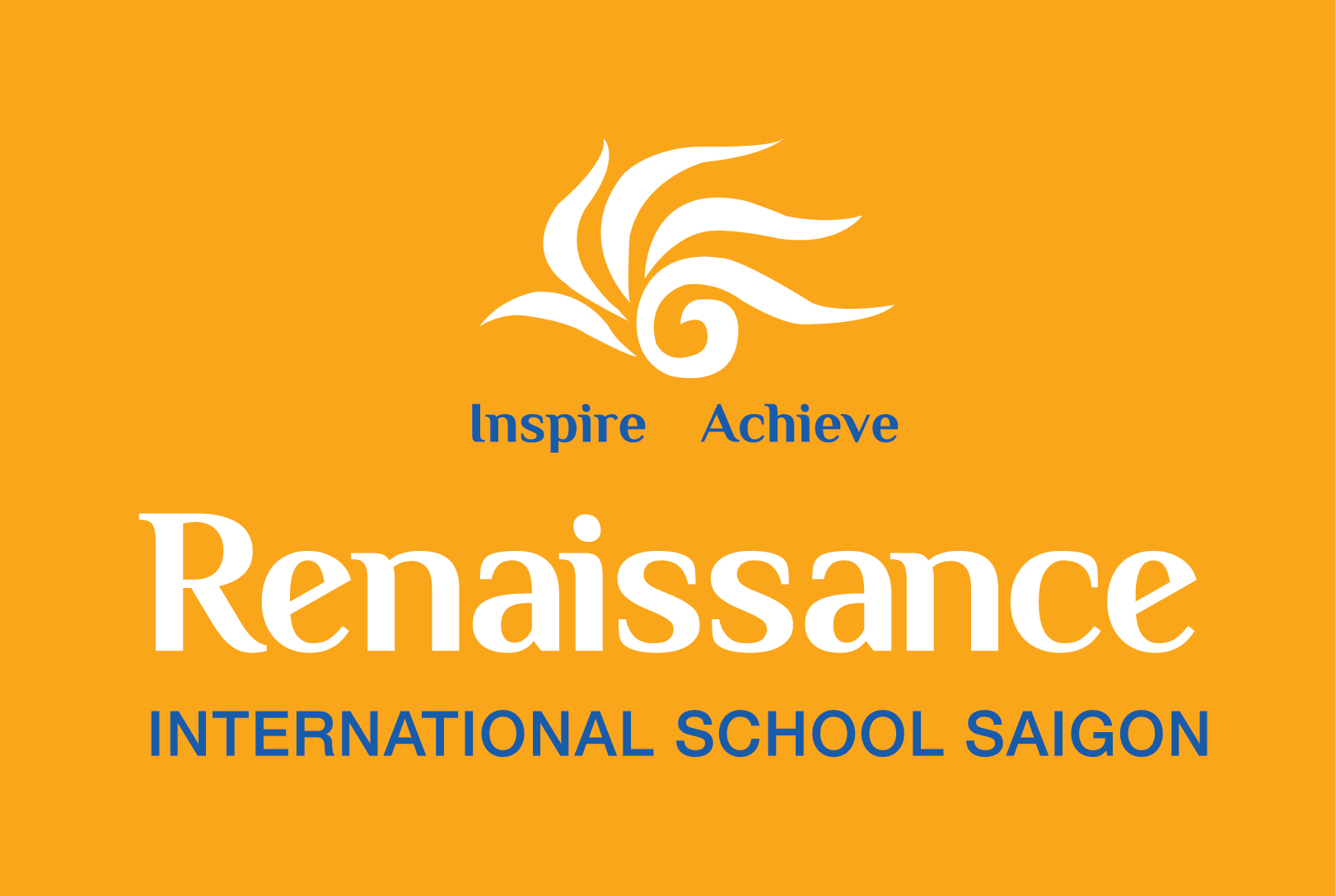
- Ho Chi Minh City; Vietnam

Information
- Type: International School
- Motto: Be happy, belong, be excellent
- Established: 2007
- Founder: Khai Sang Corporation
- Chairman: Chairman
- Head of School: Andy Roberts
- Grades: K–12
- Accreditation: IB World School (IB Continuum School), Council of International Schools (Fully accredited)
- Website: https://www.renaissance.edu.vn/
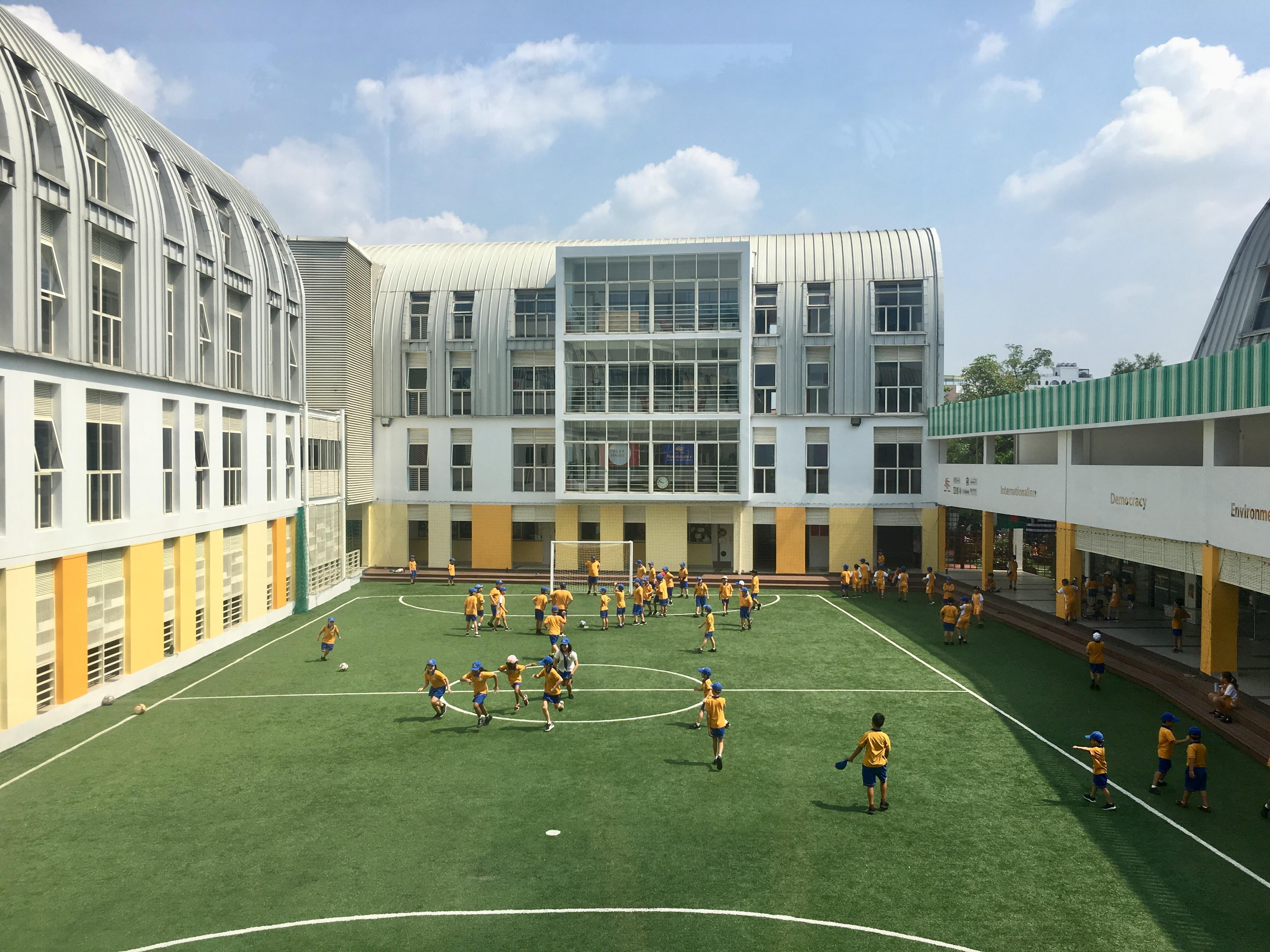

The Renaissance International School Saigon (Vietnamese: Trường Quốc tế Renaissance) is a private international school in District 7, Ho Chi Minh City, Vietnam. Founded in 2007, the school opened in May 2008, the school provides an English-medium education from Early Years through Year 13. Renaissance is an International Baccalaureate (IB) World School authorized to offer the Primary Years Programme (PYP), Middle Years Programme (MYP), and Diploma Programme (DP), and also offers the Cambridge International General Certificate of Secondary Education (IGCSE) in Years 10 and 11.

The school serves a diverse international community and is accredited by the Council of International Schools (CIS; Hội đồng các Trường Quốc tế). It is also a member of the Federation of British International Schools in Asia (FOBISIA) and the East Asia Regional Council of Schools (EARCOS).

== History ==
Renaissance International School Saigon was established in 2007 and welcomed its first students in 2008. The school was founded to provide an international education based on English-language instruction while integrating the cultural and educational context of Vietnam.

In 2009, Renaissance was authorized to deliver the International Baccalaureate Diploma Programme (IBDP), becoming one of the early adopters of the programme in Vietnam. The school's first IB Diploma cohort graduated in 2011.

During the following decade, Renaissance expanded its academic programmes and strengthened its international standing through accreditation and professional affiliations. The school became a member of the Council of International Schools (CIS) in 2016 and was awarded CIS accreditation in 2017. Following a comprehensive evaluation process, its accreditation was successfully renewed in 2023, maintaining its status as a CIS-accredited institution.

Renaissance joined the Federation of British International Schools in Asia (FOBISIA) in 2018 and became a member of the East Asia Regional Council of Schools (EARCOS) in 2019. These affiliations support collaboration, professional development, and student engagement across international school networks throughout Asia-Pacific.

By the mid-2020s, the school had completed its development as an IB Continuum School, offering all three International Baccalaureate programmes from primary through pre-university education.

== Curriculum ==
Renaissance International School Saigon delivers an English-language curriculum from Early Years through Year 13. The curriculum combines International Baccalaureate programmes with Cambridge International qualifications and is designed around inquiry-based learning, critical thinking, international-mindedness and academic preparation for higher education.

=== Primary Years Programme (PYP) ===
Students aged 2 to 11 follow the International Baccalaureate Primary Years Programme (PYP), which emphasises inquiry-based learning, conceptual understanding and interdisciplinary study.

=== Middle Years Programme (MYP) ===
The Middle Years Programme (MYP) serves students aged 11 to 16 and focuses on critical thinking, interdisciplinary learning, personal development and global perspectives. The programme aims to develop independent learners capable of applying knowledge in real-world contexts.

=== Cambridge IGCSE ===
Students in Years 10 and 11 undertake Cambridge International General Certificate of Secondary Education (IGCSE) courses across a range of academic disciplines. The programme provides externally assessed qualifications recognised by universities and educational institutions worldwide.

A notable feature of the school's academic structure is the integration of Cambridge IGCSE qualifications within a full International Baccalaureate continuum. Students complete IGCSE studies before progressing to the IB Diploma Programme, combining the subject-specialist and externally assessed nature of Cambridge qualifications with the inquiry-based educational philosophy of the IB.

In announcing its MYP authorisation, the school stated that it had become the only IB Continuum School in Ho Chi Minh City offering all three IB programmes alongside the Cambridge IGCSE curriculum.

=== IB Diploma Programme (IBDP) ===
Students in Years 12 and 13 follow the International Baccalaureate Diploma Programme, a two-year pre-university qualification recognised by higher education institutions internationally. The programme includes six academic subject groups as well as the core requirements of Theory of Knowledge (TOK), the Extended Essay (EE), and Creativity, Activity, Service (CAS).

== Accreditation and Memberships ==
Renaissance International School Saigon is accredited by the Council of International Schools (CIS), with accreditation first awarded in 2017 and renewed in 2023.

The school is authorised by the International Baccalaureate Organization (IBO) to offer the PYP, MYP and Diploma Programme and is recognised as an IB Continuum School.

Renaissance is also authorised by Cambridge International Education to deliver Cambridge IGCSE qualifications.

The school has been a member of FOBISIA since 2018 and EARCOS since 2019.

== Campus ==
The school operates a purpose-built campus in District 7, Ho Chi Minh City. Facilities include science laboratories, information technology suites, specialist arts and music spaces, a theatre-style auditorium, sports facilities, a gymnasium and a swimming pool.

== Student Body ==
As of 2026, independent education directories reported an enrolment of approximately 500–600 students aged 2 to 18 years.
