= Nguyễn Mạnh Hùng =

Vietnamese artist

- Born: 1976 (age 49–50); Hanoi, Vietnam
- Occupation: Multidisciplinary artist

Nguyễn Mạnh Hùng (born 1976) is a Vietnamese multidisciplinary artist based in Ho Chi Minh City.

Hùng makes art that reflects the comical situations arising from the rapid yet piecemeal processes of domestic urbanization and modernization. Nguyen Manh Hùng's artworks present immersive environments with droll juxtapositions that cleverly allude to national and cultural realities in Vietnam, as well as personal and contemporary life experiences, focusing on the visual relationships of disjointed elements and unusual scales. Hung reflects on the idea of community, the conflicts that exist within and without constructed societies, and the complexities of civic development and individual responsibility. Depicting military airplane laden down with oversize grocery items, or else soaring across the sky with bushels from the rice harvest, Hung's surreal scenes humorously morph a symbol of destruction with conduits of hope, benevolence and joy.

== Life ==
Born in 1976, a year after the American–Vietnam War, Hùng grew up observing its effects on daily life and reflecting on them through paintings. He graduated from the University of Fine Arts in Hanoi in 2002. Hung is also known as the art director of Nha San Studio (from 2008 to 2011), the first non profit artist led art space for contemporary art in Hanoi since 1998. He supports young artists to analyze and realize their work at Nha San.

== Work ==
=== 2D works ===
The works of Nguyễn Mạnh Hùng focuses mainly on the idea of representation. He creates paintings and sculptures juxtaposed with a great sense of humor different elements of the history of Vietnam. He questions the notion of kitsch, comparing scholarly and popular cultures. Partly influenced by early and contemporary Surrealism, Hung confronts these issues with his trademark irony and humor highlighting the oftentimes absurdity of human behavior and endeavor.

=== 3D works ===
Keeping the militaristic themes that are prominent in his earlier paintings, Nguyen exercised greater freedom in transforming previous concepts into resonant, 3D installations that are redolent of Vietnamese life. Making witty references to his Hanoi upbringing, Nguyen's interpretations were unabashed and direct, transporting audiences to a world in which everything is made bare through his biting humor.

=== Sound ===
Beside being a visual artist, Nguyễn Mạnh Hùng also a musician. He has participated in Hanoi New Music Festival (2013, Hanoi New Music Meeting (2009, Dai Lam Linh (2009), From Cricket to Airplane (2008), Hanoi Moving (2007), Sound from apartment blocks – Asian Art Mart Singapore (2007), Stories of us (2005), Nowhwerefolk (2003)

== Exhibition ==
His work was featured in the 7th Asia Pacific Triennial of Contemporary Art at the Queensland Art Gallery | Gallery of Modern Art in Brisbane, Australia. Notable regional and international exhibitions include 'Mien Meo Mieng' at Bildemuseet, Umea, Sweden (2015); ‘Living together in paradise’ at the Goethe-Institut, Hanoi, Vietnam (2011); ‘One Planet’ at Galerie Quynh, Ho Chi Minh City, Vietnam (2013); 'Tam Ta' at San Art, Ho Chi Minh City (2010); ‘Lim Dim: Young Vietnamese Artists’ at Stenersenmuseet, Oslo (2009); 'transPOP: Korea Vietnam Remix’ at ARKO Art Center, Seoul, and Yerba Buena Center for the Arts, San Francisco (2007–2008); ‘Connect: Kunstzene Vietnam’ presented by ifa Galleries, Berlin and Stuttgart (2009); New Asian Waves' presented by ZKM Center for Art and Media, Karlsruhe, Germany (2007). In 2014, he was an artist-in-residence at Musee D'Art Contemporain Du Val-de-Marne (MAC/VAL) in France. Recently, Hung been participated in Creative Fusion, an urban-based, community-engaged residency program for international artists created by the Cleveland Foundation, Ohio.
