= Lim Khim Katy =

Vietnamese artist

- Born: 1978 (age 47–48); Ho Chi Minh City, Vietnam
- Known for: Painting

Lim Khim Katy (born 1978) is a contemporary Vietnamese artist.

== Biography ==
Lim Khim Katy was born in 1978 in Ho Chi Minh City, Vietnam, to a Chinese Cambodian father and a Vietnamese mother. She graduated from Ho Chi Minh City Fine Arts University in 2001 with a BA and an MFA in 2010. Her paintings often focus on middle class or poor Vietnamese people going through troubling times in their lives. In juxtaposition, she paints nostalgic villages landscapes that express both strong emotion and great tranquility.

== Painting style ==
Lim Khim Katy continues to use a palette knife to paint her landscapes but for her figurative work, she will use a brush for the detail work.

She never uses a model when painting. Instead, she creates her subjects' features and emotions purely from her mind. Likewise, her landscapes are never painted with a specific place in mind or even a photograph of a place. She paints from her imagination with her emotions at the time determining the colors of the forest and river.

After twenty years of being an artist, Lim Khim Katy continues to approach each new day of painting with eagerness and exhilaration. She strives to improve and evolve as a painter with her works becoming more emotional and having societal relevance.

== Exhibitions and awards ==
- 2001
  - Certificate of merit at Vietnam National Fine Arts Exhibition for the painting "Naptime"
  - Certificate of merit at Asia Pacific Contemporary Fine Arts Exhibition organized by Philip Morris for the painting "The Power of Numbers"
  - Certificate of merit of section 6 exhibition for the painting "Silence"
- 2003
  - Award from the Vietnam Literary and Artistry Association at Section 6 Exhibition for the painting "Empty Bowls"
- 2004
  - Third prize of Young's Eyes Exhibition organized by the Consulate General of France and the Vietnam Literary and Artistry Association for the painting "Empty Bowls"
  - Consultation prize at Vietnam ethnic minority artists exhibition organized by the Fine Arts Association for the painting "Everyone has his own dream"
- 2005
  - Solo Exhibition in Hanoi, Vietnam
  - Certificate of merit at Vietnam National Fine Arts Exhibition for the painting "Black Sea"
  - Award from the Vietnam Association at Section 6 Exhibition for the painting "Asian Woman"
  - International Exhibition in Museum Vietnam for the painting "Thinking of Another People"
- 2006
  - Solo Exhibition "Symphony of Thoughts" at La Lanta Fine Arts in Bangkok, Thailand
