= Bernadette Phan =

Vietnamese artist

Bernadette Phan (born 1966) is a Vancouver based visual artist working with painting and drawing.

== Early life and education ==
Phan was born in Cambodia to Vietnamese parents, and was raised in France and Canada. She received a Bachelor of Fine Arts (BFA) in Studio Arts at Concordia University in Montreal, Quebec, and a Master of Fine Arts (MFA) in Printmaking at Temple University in Philadelphia, Pennsylvania.

== Works ==
Ovalicity, 2004

Ovalicity is a series of paintings engaging with oval shaped marks depicted across the work's "painterly, atmospheric surfaces."

=== Trippy Ethers, 2009 ===
Trippy Ethers is a series of painting moving away from expressive marks of shapes, and utilizing strokes to create small marks of paint, ranging over the canvas. There is no accumulating image that rises out of the painted surface, but instead the sense of space and dimension is formed in the viewer's mind. Trippy Ethers can be understood as an attempt to reverse the contemporary conditions of information overload. Kelowna Art Gallery describes Phan's series as being "not monotonous...," but as "rich, meditative, contemplative works that invoke a quietude within the viewer".

== Exhibitions ==
=== Solo exhibitions ===
- Bernadette Phan, Syntax Gallery at the International Centre of Arts and Technology, Vancouver, British Columbia, 2017
- Float, Equinox Gallery, Vancouver, British Columbia, 2003

=== Group exhibitions ===
- Lili and the Migratory Influences, Burnaby Public Library, Burnaby, British Columbia, 2015
- The Point Is, Kelowna Art Gallery, Kelowna, British Columbia, 2011
- Fantastic, Centre A, Vancouver, British Columbia, 2007
- Some New Paintings: Bernadette Phan, Philippe Raphanel, Ben Reeves, Equinox Gallery, Vancouver, British Columbia, 2002
