= Đoàn Công Tính =

Vietnamese photographer (b. 1943)

Đoàn Công Tính (born 1943) was a Vietnamese photographer for the People's Army of Vietnam. Nicknamed "King of the Battlefield", Tính was well-known for capturing the action of the war and getting his images published in a timely manner.

== Career ==
At the age of 19, Tính volunteered for the People's Army of Vietnam. In 1965, he graduated as an artillery officer from the military academy. During his time in school, he purchased a Russian-made Feddeka camera from his classmate and taught himself photography.

In 1967, Tính started to use his own photographs to accompany the articles that he wrote for the political newspaper. His commander, noticing his interest in photography, issued him a German Praktica camera. Tính later volunteered to cover the Southern front along the Ho Chi Minh trail from 1970 to 1973. He served as a photographer for the Vietnam News Agency.

== Controversy ==
An image of North Vietnamese soldiers climbing a rope near a waterfall taken in 1970 that was exhibited as part of the International Photojournalism Festival of Perpignan (Visa pour l’image Perpignan) in France and later republished in a photo gallery by The New York Times, was later discovered to have been photoshopped. Danish photographer Jørn Stjerneklar noticed the difference between the image displayed in the festival and the original, while on a visit to Tính.

Tính apologised for 'mistakenly' sending the photoshopped image, claiming that the original negative had been damaged and that he accidentally included a copy of the image with a photoshopped background in a CD to the organisers. The controversy ignited debates around the presumed objectivity of photojournalism and the role of photography in propaganda.
