= Chou Yu-cheng =

Taiwanese artist

- 周育正
- Born: 1976 (age 49–50); Taipei, Taiwan
- Education: National Taiwan University of Arts; École nationale supérieure des Beaux-Arts
- Awards: Taishin Annual Visual Art Award; 2011; Taipei Art Award; 2012
- Website: yuchengchou.com

Chou Yu-cheng (Chinese: 周育正; born 1976) is a Taiwanese conceptual artist based in Taipei.

== Biography ==
Chou Yu-cheng was born in Taipei, and received a BFA from the National Taiwan University of Arts in 1999 and an MFA from the École nationale supérieure des Beaux-Arts de Paris in 2007. A graduate from the research programme La Seine, he received the Taipei Art Award in 2012 and the Taishin Annual Visual Art Award in 2011.

== Work ==
His work is held in museum collections including the Hong-gah Museum in Taiwan, and the Centre for Chinese Contemporary Art in Manchester in the United Kingdom.

== Exhibitions ==
Chou has exhibited at the Künstlerhaus Bethanien in Berlin, the Centre for Chinese Contemporary Art in Manchester and the Taipei Fine Art Museum in Taipei. His work 'Chemical Gilding, Keep Calm, Galvanise, Pray, Gradient, Ashes, Manifestation, Unequal, Dissatisfaction, Capitalise, Incense Burner, Survival, Agitation, Hit, Day Light' was shown at the Künstlerhaus Bethanien in Berlin in 2015 Other exhibitions include:

- 2012 – Neon, National Taiwan Museum of Fine Arts, Taichung, Taiwan
- 2014 – Listz, Kaohsiung Museum of Fine Arts, Kaohsiung, Taiwan
- 2015 – Another Geoff Molyneux, Asia Now Paris, Paris, France.
