= Nguyễn Trinh Thi =

- Born: 1973 (age 52–53); Hanoi, North Vietnam
- Education: Hanoi Foreign Studies College (1994); University of Iowa (1999); University of California, San Diego (2005)
- Occupations: Independent filmmaker, documentarian, and video artis

Nguyễn Trinh Thi (阮純詩, born 1973) is a Hanoi-based independent filmmaker, documentarian, and video artist. She is known for her layered, personal, and poetic approach to contentious histories and current events through experiments with the moving image. Regarded as one of the pioneers of her home country Vietnam's independent cinema, Thi is seen as the most notable video artist in Vietnam's contemporary art scene. She plays an important role in the country's cinema, with works shown in international festivals and exhibitions.

Inspired by her heritage, her pieces are powerful and haunting, and they focus on social and cultural issues, especially the complex, traumatic history of Vietnam and its after-effects in the present. In her longer documentary films, she employs calm and quiet visuals while eschewing voiceovers in order to let the people of her country speak directly to the camera. Her diverse practice has consistently investigated the role of memory in the necessary unveiling of hidden, displaced, or misinterpreted histories, and she has examined the position of artists in the Vietnamese society.

== Styles and Themes ==
Nguyen's works dealt with unspoken histories in Vietnam and called into question national agendas and societal norms. Her nuanced treatment of provocative and political content encapsulates the complexities of Southeast Asian history and the perplexing (and sometimes frustrating) role of the artist working within this multi-faceted sociopolitical framework.

Her practice has consistently investigated the role of memory in the necessary unveiling of hidden, displaced, or misinterpreted histories, often making use of original documentary footage or undertaking extensive investigative field work. Her materials are diverse – from video and photographs shot by herself, to those appropriated from various sources including press photos, corporate videos, and classic films. Her practice traverses boundaries between film and video art, installation and performance.

Trinh Thi is interested in History, the Truth, in taboo subjects. She gives voice to marginalized people in society, to those who have suffered trauma in the past. She is a filmmaker who dares to question the country's history, one that differs from the reconstruction produced by propaganda. Trinh Thi leads searches not only for reality, but is also for images. In her quest, she is constantly experimenting with new structures, formal tests on her creative path. She goes from the live-movie (Love man love woman) to found-footage thumbnail (Song to the front), from experimental documentary (Chronicle of a Tape Recorded Over) to video installations (Unsubtitled, Que faire). At the core of her work, a progressive exploration of her personal vision, Trinh Thi pays attention to gestural details, to the expressive faces of people who expose themselves and emerge from the backdrop of a chaotic world. Her gaze is silent, anxious, humanist.

== Life and education ==
Nguyen Trinh Thi studied journalism, photography, international relations, and ethnographic film in the United States. She earned a Bachelor of Arts degree in Russian and English from Hanoi Foreign Studies College, Hanoi, in 1994; a master's degree in Professional Journalism, University of Iowa, Iowa City, in 1999; and Master of Pacific International Affairs, University of California, San Diego (UCSD), in 2005.

After studying journalism and photography at the University of Iowa; and international studies and ethnographic film at University of California, San Diego, she decided to return to Vietnam to pursue a career as an independent filmmaker at a time when this concept was still foreign and filmmaking was very difficult due to censorship. Thi returned to her home country, Vietnam, after spending many years in the United States, where she studied journalism and filmmaking among other things. Here, documentary films had primarily been the domain of the Vietnam Documentary & Scientific Studio, which produces films by order of the government. A free documentary film scene was practically non-existent, for numerous reasons: There was no access to work opportunities, production budgets and distribution channels, as well as to training opportunities, contacts to the international scene and knowledge about the development trends of documentary films elsewhere in the world. This was augmented by the pressure of censorship and the lack of interest of the general public, which equated documentary films with propaganda. So there were many different obstacles preventing a documentary film culture from developing in Vietnam.

In 2009, Nguyen founded and directs Hanoi DocLab, an educational center and studio for the production of documentary films and video art in Hanoi.

== Work ==
=== Letters from Panduranga (2015) ===
Through a network of Champa scholars, Nguyen spent a number of residency periods in Ninh Thuan between 2013 and 2015. Letters from Panduranga extends her experimentation between documentary and fiction in an essay film portraying a Cham community living in the most southern and last surviving territory of Champa, an ancient kingdom dating back nearly two thousand years and conquered by Dai Viet (present day Vietnam) in 1832. The essay film, made in the form of a letter exchange between two filmmakers, was inspired by the fact that the Vietnamese government is to build Vietnam's first two nuclear power plants in Ninh Thuan, right at the spiritual heart of the Cham people, threatening the survival of this ancient matriarchal Hindu culture. Public discussions regarding the project have been largely absent in Vietnam due to strict government controls over public speech and media, and local communities have also been excluded from consultations. The film alludes to the legacy of war and colonialism; exploring and reflecting on landscape and portrait, documentary and fiction, and art and ethnography as methods of working in film and art, and their limitations in accessing other cultures, peoples, and experiences, as well as history and the past. Nguyen Trinh Thi says, "As artists, we have contradictory desires: to be engaged, but also to disappear." Among other references are facts relating to the United States' destructive bombing during the Vietnam War, artifacts from colonial exhibitions and art collections, the vulgar place of tourists and the cultural policies of UNESCO, and quotes from one of Nguyen's main influences, Chris Marker, notably his film essay Letter from Siberia (1957), and Statues Also Die (1953), both of which were incisive and novel in their critique of the impacts of industrial and colonial movements.

In previously mentioned Art Radar interview it was asked: In Letters from Panduranga, you said you did not want to speak on behalf of the "other" – the Cham community. However, they are part of contemporary Vietnam and their history has been subsumed into Vietnamese history. Why were you nervous to represent the Cham people?

To which Nguyen responded: Although we are all part of Vietnam now, we belong to very different groups. Vietnam is a national group, but there are so many methods of categorisation. My biggest concern was that I was imposing my perspective and vision on them. After the trip, I made a version that was more like a documentary, but I didn't like it. It felt like the film was pretending to be objective, without really reflecting the depth and complexity of the story. Letters from Panduranga is not a film solely about the Cham people. I tried to connect their struggle to a broader issue – suppression of our voices. As I mentioned earlier, the underlying theme is power structures and who can use the image.

=== Song to the Front (2011–2012) ===
Nguyen Trinh Thi re-edited the historical Vietnamese war film, Bài Ca Ra Trận, which was originally produced in 1973 by the Vietnam Feature Film Studio. She transformed the obscure black-and-white classic into a vignette that deconstructed the melodramatic and romanticized elements of social-realist drama.

An original Northern Vietnamese film, Song to the Front is a propagandist story of patriotism, a typical genre of this style of cinema that glorifies the heroic struggle of the proletariat class. Nguyen uses a form of suspense editing akin to the mastery of Hitchcock, where the composition of the lens, grade of color, and sound dramatizes the narrative. In Nguyen's edit, this near-blinded young man is shown as a human being with emotion who transforms into a fighting machine. A starry-lit sky cuts in and then a series of birds take flight. This young man's eyes may be bandaged but his memories give him strength. After receiving surgery for his battle wounds, this heroic soldier is very weak with poor sight, but determined to continue to fight. The piece ends with the sounds of firing bullets and a young man's crazed glee at qualifying as marksman to return to the front with a gun in his hands.

Nguyen extrapolates the central narrative of the film into a five-minute abstraction, her jump cuts and use of still frames are heightened with her use of Stravinsky's The Rite of Spring, referring to the ritual in pre-Christian Russia where a young girl dances herself to death – a vision that Stravinsky claimed was to propitiate the god of Spring. For Nguyen, these young soldiers who gave their lives for their country are the sacrificed pagans.

Her version of 'Song to the Front' plays with the original plot line in a deliberately ambiguous manner, designing an imaginative space for the viewer to reinterpret what were intended to be very literal epics that enforce an ideological view.

=== Series: "Unsubtitled" (2010), "Que faire" (2012), and "Solo for a Choir" (2013) ===
In this series, Nguyen explores the possibilities for combining video installation with performance art, and of preserving differences of individuals while creating a sense of collective experience. Nguyen worked on a long-term film project about the Nhân Văn–Giai Phẩm affair – the suppressed literary movement of the 1950s and the only instance of widespread intellectual dissidence ever to occur in North Vietnam – and its legacy of dissent in Vietnamese art over the past five decades. Thematically, she continues to study these issues and reflects on the history and development of the role and position of the artist in Vietnamese society and issues related to Vietnam's problems concerning censorship and artist freedom of expression. Nguyen invited nineteen Hanoi artists who make up the social constellation of Nha San Studio to face the camera, eat a food item of their choice, and to then state their name followed by the food item they had just consumed. Individually, these are statements parodying the Maoist practice of self-criticism, interrogation sessions where the artist in question must unequivocally explain the meaning of his work. Collectively, the chorus evokes a quiet protest against the long-running methods of surveillance and intimidation that are still pervasive in Vietnam.

=== Landscape Series #1 (2013) ===
Nguyen's Landscape Series #1 (2013) meditates on the idea of the landscape "as the silent witness of history." During her search for photos, Nguyen came across hundreds of images of unidentified people in landscapes in the same position: pointing to indicate a past event, the location of something gone, something lost or missing. In these images, the figures are all in a similar pose, pointing at something unseen in the distance – a drama, a disappearance, a tragic episode, something that clearly seems to represent a past or a present threat, a yawning gap – which, since it cannot be seen, can only be pointed out. Together these anonymous witnesses, portrayed in compelling uniformity by innumerable Vietnamese press photographers, seem to be indicating a direction, a way forward out of the past, a fictional journey.

=== Love Man Love Woman (2007) ===
Nguyen's documentary Love Man Love Woman (2007) explores the lives of gay men in Vietnam and focuses on the prevalent theme of repression in society. The film portrays master Luu Ngoc Duc, a famous spirit medium in Hanoi, as well the Mother Goddess cult in Vietnam, whose communities offer a haven to many gay Vietnamese. The Dong Co, or the religion's priestesses, perform rites and rituals that include dazzling altars, flamboyant costumes, candles, incense, sequins, and feathers.

Love Man Love Woman is not an ethnographic film about the Dao Mau community. The essence of the film is Master Luu Ngoc Duc, a spirit medium of the religion. He has a very rich Vietnamese vocabulary and was always quoting literature, poetry and folk phrases. It is amazing to watch him talk, and that kind of language is dying. Young people don't talk like that anymore, even I find my Vietnamese so poor.

She has produced documentary and experimental films that have been screened in film festivals in USA, China, Cambodia, Indonesia, Brazil, and in Europe.

She has taken part in international exhibitions such as Singapore Biennale 2013, Jakarta Biennale 2013, Move on Asia: Video Art in Asia 2002 to 2012 (ZKM Museum of Contemporary Art, Germany 2013), Women in Between: Asian Women Artists 1984-2012 (Fukuoka Asian Art Museum, Japan 2012), and Kuandu Biennale (Taiwan 2010). Based in Hanoi, she also founded and directs Hanoi DOCLAB, a center for documentary films and the moving image since 2009.

She's had participation in the International Short Film Festival Oberhausen; Arthub, Bangkok. Exhibitions a.o. at the Tate Modern, London; Stenersen Museet, Oslo. Solo exhibitions a.o. at NhaSan Studio, Hanoi; Kuandu Biennale, Taipei.

Two of her video works, Love Man Love Woman (2007) and Letters from Panduranga (2015) were showcased at NTU Centre for Contemporary Art Singapore (NTU CCA Singapore) for the exhibition "Ghosts and Spectres—Shadows of History", which ended on 19 November 2017.

== DocLab ==
Thi worked together with a group of filmmakers and artists to elaborate a concept for a centre for documentary films and video art, described as "a centre with its focus on education, art, research and experimentation". The name was suddenly there, DocLab, a lab for experiments and a Vietnamese play with the sound of words and their meanings, and the right place was also found promptly: in the building of the Hanoi Goethe Institute, as, due to the cultural agreement, this was the only place with free access and a censure-free area. Despite considerable resistance, Thi and a small group of Vietnamese filmmakers and artists have succeeded in building a centre step by step with the help of the Goethe Institute which provides training and promotes exchange in the area of documentary films besides having produced a community of committed young filmmakers who are increasingly networked with the international scene, thereby pushing open a door to the world for Vietnamese documentary films.

In 2007, she founded Hanoi Independent Documentary & Experimental Filmmakers Forum (Hi-DEFF) to encourage independent filmmaking in Vietnam and collaborations among artists, filmmakers and others that holds biweekly documentary and experimental film screenings in Hanoi.

Nguyen is the founding director of Hanoi DocLab (2009), a centre which provides training besides having produced a community of committed young filmmakers who are increasingly networked with the international documentary scene, where she continues to teach today. DOCLAB is a center/lab for documentary filmmaking and video art opened in October 2009 and based at the Goethe Institute in Hanoi. Their activities include:

• Basic film and video training courses

• Editing, sound-designing and writing workshops

• Weekly screenings and discussions opened for everyone

• Editing lab for filmmakers and video artists

• Video/film and book library accessible to the public

In a 2017 interview with Art Radar when asked, "Do you think that it is part of the role of the artist in Southeast Asia to create platforms for public exposure in the arts?"

She answered: "DOCLAB came out of a need to start a community. Before I moved back to Vietnam, there were not many independent artist communities in Hanoi. Community is very important when you work as an independent artist. When I lived in Los Angeles, I was close to the Echo Park Film Center and it was very inspiring for me. When I moved back to Hanoi, I became involved in different film projects and learned more about the local conditions through those experiences. When the Goethe Institute offered a grant to do something in documentary film, I already had an idea about what we needed locally and the best approach to take in building such an organisation. Over the years, DOCLAB became a complete system with training courses, screenings, exchange, and now we even have festivals. I taught there for the first three years but now I've stopped to focus on my own work."

In a 2010 interview when asked, "what affect do you think this will have on the nurturing of film practice and screening in Vietnam?"

She answered: "I don't have any ambitions in changing the film practice in Vietnam. This is a very small effort; it won't change the industry a bit. I'm also not training professional people. I hope to give people larger exposure to practices of documentary filmmaking in the world, encourage them to create and think for themselves. Actually people who come to the training and screenings come from all kinds of disciplines. We're also hoping to nurture a local audience with a more critical awareness of documentary and experimental film, and video art."

== Filmography ==
"Eleven Men": found footage (2016)

"Jo Ha Kyu": experimental film, 10 minutes, HD video, color (2012)

"I Died for Beauty", experimental film, 7 minutes, HD video, color (2012)

"Rain, Poems, Toilet Paper": documentary, 70 minutes, video, color (in production)

"Song to the Front": experimental film, 5 minutes, B&W (2011) (#1 in project "Vietnamese Classics Re-Cut Series")

"Unsubtitled": video installation (various loops), HD video, color (2011)

"Chronicle of a Tape Recorded Over": experimental documentary, 25 minutes, video, color (2011)

"Terminal": video, single channel, 5 minutes, color (2009)

"Spring Comes Winter After": experimental video, 6 minutes, color (2009)

"93 Years, 1383 Days": experimental documentary, 30 minutes, video, color (2008)

"Love Man Love Woman": documentary, 52 minutes, video, color (2007)

"A Chungking Road Opening": documentary,20 minutes, video, color (2005)

== Exhibitions/screenings ==
Nguyen Trinh Thi's documentary and experimental films have been screened at international festivals and art exhibitions including Jeu de Paume, Paris (2015); CAPC musée d'art contemporain de Bordeaux; the Lyon Biennale (2015); Asian Art Biennial, Taipei, Taiwan (2015), Taiwan; 5th Fukuoka Triennale, Fukuoka Asian Art Museum, Japan (2014); Finalist Exhibition, APBF Signature Art Prize, Singapore Art Museum (2014); 15th Jakarta Biennale, Indonesia (2013); "If The World Changed," 4th Singapore Biennale (2013); "Move on Asia: Video Art in Asia 2002 to 2012," ZKM, Karlsruhe, Germany (2013); Okinawa Prefecture Art Museum, Japan (2012); and DMZ International Documentary Film Festival, Korea (2011); Oberhausen International Film Festival; Bangkok Experimental Film Festival; Artist Films International; Summer Exhibition 2011, DEN FRIE Centre of Contemporary Art, Copenhagen; Unsubtitled, solo video installation, NhaSan Studio, Hanoi; 'PLUS/ Memories and Beyond – 10 Solo Exhibitions by 10 Asian Artists', Kuandu Biennale, Taipei; and 'No Soul For Sale 2', Tate Modern, London.

Screenings / Exhibitions

2012 Four Rising Talents From Southeast Asia, 10 Chancery Lane Gallery, Hong Kong

Art In The Auditorium (Artist Film International): Season 4 Screening, Seescape Gallery, Chiang Mai, Thailand

Screening, Bangkok Experimental Film Festival, Bangkok, Thailand

2011 Summer Exhibition, video installation, Den Frie Centre of Contemporary Art, Copenhagen

Skylines without Flying People, Rory Gill Fine Art Gallery, London, UK

Unsubtitled, screening, Corpo Plumhill Playhouse, Tokyo, Japan

Screening, DMZ International Documentary Film Festival, Korea

2010 Unsubtitled, solo video installation, NhaSan Studio, Hanoi, Vietnam

PLUS/ Memories and Beyond – 10 Solo Exhibitions by 10 Asian Artists, Kuandu Biennale, Taipei, Taiwan

No Soul For Sale 2, Tate Modern, London, UK

The City in Art - Part 3, Goethe Institute, Hanoi, Vietnam

2009 The Making of the New Silk Roads, ArtHub, Bangkok, Thailand

Lim Dim, Stenersen Museum, Oslo, Norway

Time Ligaments, exhibition, 10 Chancery Lane Gallery, Hong Kong

Vietnamese International Film Festival (ViFF), California

Yunnan Multi Culture Visual Festival, Kunming, China

2008 10+, a contemporary art exhibition at Nha San Studio, Hanoi, Vietnam

Strategies from Within: An Exhibition of Vietnamese and Cambodian Contemporary Art Practices, Ke Center for Contemporary Arts, Shanghai, China

In the course of our exchange, exhibition, Yunart Contemporary Art Gallery, Kunming, China

Festival Costante Cambiamento, Florence, Italy

Jean Rouch International Film Festival, Paris, France

Selection of festivals and installations: Oberhausen International Film Festival; Bangkok Experimental Film Festival; Artist Films International; Summer Exhibition 2011, DENFRIE Centre of Contemporary Art, Copenhagen; Unsubtitled, solo video installation, NhaSan Studio, Hanoi; 'PLUS / Memories and Beyond – 10 Solo Exhibitions by 10 Asian Artists', Kuandu Biennale, Taipei; 'No Soul For Sale 2', Tate Modern, London, etc...I'm a Straight of World War 2 experientially they the letting sounds progressive galvanize the world Manchu the mountain the impending the trauma the very lịch sử(History) Poem written by Nguyen Trinh Thi as part of the artistic project "Chance operation film" during the exhibition "Skyline with flying people". December 2012, Japan Foundation, Hà Nôi.

== Awards ==
- 2021: Han Nefkens Foundation’s award for moving-image work
- 2024: Prince Claus IMPACT Award 2024
