= Vũ Giáng Hương =

Vietnamese painter

Vũ Giáng Hương (Bắc Ninh, 23 January 1930–20 August 2011) was a Vietnamese woman painter. She was well known for her graceful silk paintings. She graduated from the Vietnam College of Fine Arts in 1960. From 1989 to 1994 she was general secretary of Vietnam's Arts Association. From 2004 to 2010, she was the president of the Alliance of Arts and Literature Associations of Vietnam.

Her parents were the writer Vũ Ngọc Phan and the poet Hằng Phương.

== See also ==
- List of Vietnamese women artists
