= Dao Droste =

Vietnamese-born artist living in Germany

Dao Droste (born 1952) is a Vietnamese-born artist living in Germany.

She was born in Saigon and moved to Germany in 1971. Droste studied chemistry in Stuttgart and Heidelberg, earning a PhD. She went on to work in sculpture, painting, and installation art. She established her own studio in 1987. She now lives in Eppelheim.

== Career ==
Her large installation piece "Open-mindedness", which included 500 terra cotta faces, attracted international attention.

As a Taoist, she explores the theme of mankind in harmony with nature in her art.

Droste designed the statue for the One World Award, which is sponsored by Rapunzel Naturkost and the International Federation of Organic Agriculture Movements.

In 2015, she received the environmental prize awarded by the German Working Group for Environmental Management (BAUM).

Her work is held in public and private collections, including the Carl Bosch Museum in Heidelberg, the Federal Ministry of Education and Research in Berlin, and the city of Eppelheim.
