= Rapunzel Naturkost =

German food company

- Company type: GmbH
- Industry: Agricultural production and sales
- Founded: 1974
- Headquarters: Legau im Landkreis Unterallgäu
- Key people: Joseph Wilhelm, Margit Epple, Leonhard Wilhelm
- Revenue: ca. 185 Million Euro (2016)
- Number of employees: 350 (2016)
- Website: www.rapunzel.de

Rapunzel Naturkost GmbH is a German company founded in 1974 that produces and sells vegetarian organic food. The company has its headquarters in Legau in Unterallgäu.
