= Trần Đông Lương =

Vietnamese painter

Trần Đông Lương (1925–1993) was a Vietnamese painter. He was a graduate of Tô Ngọc Vân's resistance class. Later he was one of many artists in Vietnam who worked from studios at the age of 65 in Nguyễn Thái Học Street, Hanoi.

== Works ==
- "Un groupe de brodeurs", 1958.
- "Portrait of a Young Woman", water colour on silk.

== Sources ==
- Vietnam Notebooks (in French).
