= Nha San Collective =

Non-profit art museum in Vietnam

Nha San Collective is the first and longest-running, non-profit, artist-run space for experimental art that was realized in the political scene in Vietnam. It has been a pioneer in facilitating an experimental art movement and in promoting contemporary culture.

== Background ==
In 1998, artist or curator Tran Luong and artist Nguyen Manh Duc founded Nhà Sàn Studio, the first experimental art space in Hanoi at Nguyen Manh Duc's own home: Muong ethnic minority house on wooden stilts.

Nha San studio nurtured the first generation of Vietnamese avant-garde artists emergent in the early 1990s, including Truong Tan, Tran Luong, Nguyen Van Cuong, Nguyen Minh Thanh, Nguyen Quang Huy, Ea Sola, and Kim Ngoc. It has also become a valuable resource for a younger generation of artists, including Nguyen Trinh Thi, Nguyen Phuong Linh, Nguyen Huy An, Tuan Mami the Appendix, Nguyen Tran Nam, etc. to continue developing their own cultural scene. Nhà Sàn Studio has proved to be a near-perfect place to host underground alternative art exhibitions and events in the local scene.

Following the spirit of artistic creativity and contemporary culture, the young generation of artists from Nha San Studio in 2013 decided to form 'Nhà Sàn Collective', continuing the mission of Nha San Studio to build a stable structure for contemporary art to grow in the restrictive cultural and political environment of the local scene. Just as Nha San Studio before, Nha San Collective is still a place for experimental art, but under a more open approach, where everybody can come to work and exchange knowledge with each other.

Nha San offers Vietnamese artists the chance to create, exhibit and respond to work. In a socio-political environment where experimental art can be a risky endeavor, Nha San provides the crucial space needed for developing artistic practices, sharing experiences – both invigorating and engendering an artistic community that is hungry for change. It provides Vietnamese artists with the opportunity to collaborate with international artists creating a cultural exchange, and networks to develop, and learn from the world beyond the country's border. Since 1998, Nha San has hosted many exhibitions, open studios, workshops, lectures, and talks of local and international artists/ curators. Some highlight events such as: Asia Window 2002, Emerging artist program every year, IN:ACT international performance art event, Skylines With People 2012...

== History ==
=== Nha San Studio ===
When Nguyen Manh Duc browsing through the exhibition named Khởi Thủy (The beginning) in St. Joseph's Cathedral's neighborhood in Hanoi by Tran Luong, he knew that this new art form could leave a more profound impact on the spectators. It could facilitate stronger and more direct communication between the artist and the public. He realized that the thoughts and imagination weren't limited to an existing framework. At the time, visual arts were limited to the canvas frame, as the Vietnamese art scene was heading towards a deadlock. Arts in Vietnam were very much commercialized. Artists developed and became famous through the means of selling their paintings, and competition was measured by who made their works more sellable. So Nguyen Manh Duc and Tran Luong, worked together on making Nha San Studio possible. Physical space was the foundation, so that they could turn ideas into reality. Nha San Duc, and later renamed as Nha San Studio in 1998, was born out of that need.

In 1998, a lot of artists gathered here: the young, the mid-career ones, classical artists, and many others. And on the opening of an exhibition, Tran Luong stood up and announced that this space – Nha San Studio – was open for all artists. Nha San's activities were not limited to fine arts. It was truly a place for all kinds of artists.

At that time Nha San was considered a center for contemporary arts in Hanoi. Here, the artists who wanted to realize their passions, or to venture with their newly explored ideas, they felt more comfortable and more welcomed, as an artistic space for artists to engage in interdisciplinary and experimental ways of art making. When an artist wants to create an installation to challenge himself, then he can use the space at Nha San for his experimentation. Nha San, in essence, was more like a working studio, dynamic exhibition space, acting as an underground conduit for Hanoi's contemporary art scene, connecting artists to opportunities for an exchange abroad to exhibit and partake in residency programs.

=== Formation of Nha San Collective ===
Nha San supported the development of the first generation of contemporary artists in Vietnam, but in 2010 it was forced to close. During the IN:ACT festival, one of the artists created a performance where she was entirely naked in public. pictures of the performance were carelessly publicized, without any background information or explanation. It generated an enormous scandal that was broadcast on television, written about in magazines, and even worse, it attracted pornography sites. Media scrutiny turned to the political shutdown of all of Nhà Sàn's exhibition activities. But still, Nhà Sàn artists tried to adapt their creative process and found other ways to continue working, realizing the role of an alternative art space while providing important individual and collective support to the artistic practices of their peers. The young generation artists formed Nhà Sàn Collective. the place has changed, but the group has stayed the same.

There are two parts to the term "Nha San Collective". Collective means a group, and Nha San represents a group of artists who together built Nha San Studio originally. They are a group of 10 younger artists and together with the older generations, sharing the studio – working space with each other.

As there is not yet any course on contemporary art of curatorial practice in Vietnam, none amongst the first generation of Nha San artists were trained to be art managers or curators. They all picked things up along the way, did all the things that needed to be done to support their work. Nha San Collective has marked a new development as young artists were now organisers and curators themselves. The young artists who have grown up in a modern time. They've made an impact on the creative environment and expanded it as well.

Nha San artist/curator Nguyen Phuong Linh said: "A physical space is essential, but is not too important to influence our way, our society of art. We have here a legacy, a name, a history of 15 years. When the people look at Nha San, they would not see it as an academy, but an art center. So now, if there is no more a physical place of Nha San, the spirit, identity and artists of Nha San still exist out there."

=== Nha San Collective at Zone 9 ===
In 2013, Nhà Sàn opened in an abandoned medicine factory in Zone 9 of Hanoi. After 'Skylines with flying people' – though a highly experimental and considerably interactive project, the space still belonged to Japan Foundation. Therefore, the Collective artists were anxious about having a new space. They shared their thoughts with other artists in finding another location, somewhere to keep their activities going on.

At the end of April 2013, the Collectives found out about National Medicine Factory No. 2 at number 9 Tran Thanh Tong, which were open for rental after being abandoned for 2,3 years. So they decided to rent a space of 150m2, and together turned it into it a working factory and an exhibition space. Started from zero, building up from scratch, setting up the space, programming, deciding which artists to invite, finalizing the working plan for all the artists in one year. Nha San Collective was also keen to find and nurture young people who have a passion for experimental art, organizing workshops for emerging artists with constructive critique.

As Nha San developed beyond the traditional operational model, aimed to pursue the path towards multi platforms and internationally engaged artistic activities. However, they have faced a lot of challenges, in terms of techniques, theories, infrastructure, as well as social acceptance. The artists here still have to select and organize art events by themselves. They are the ones who understand clearly what difficulties they have to face, and what kind of help they need. It would take a long time to change these conditions in Vietnam. Over the course of six months at Zone 9, Nha San Collective organized 2 festivals, 11 exhibitions, 13 times of open studios and 2 festivals.

All the programs had been planned and were gradually operating. But suddenly there was a fire accident which killed 6 people. This accident led directly to the closing of Zone 9 which forced everybody to get out of this space in December 2013.

=== Nha San Collective at 24 Ly Quoc Su ===
Nhà Sàn is confronted with the difficulties of being a non-commercial art spaces, lack of funding and a supporting legal system. Despite these challenges, its artists show how creatively prolific they can be. After Zone 9, Nha San Collective moved to 24 Ly Quoc Su, in the middle of Hanoi old quarter. In celebration of the new space, Nha San organized the group exhibition "The Clouds Will Tell," showcasing the works of young artists from the Collective and other collaborators. Nha San Collective since then has continued to organize a variety of events, such as workshops, open studios, artist talks, screenings, exhibitions and more.

=== Nha San Collective at Hanoi Creative City ===
In August 2015, Nhà Sàn Collective moved to a new space located in the cultural complex of Hanoi Creative City. The opening event was the interactive exhibition "from.to." live-streamed videos of durational performances. While an actual space is necessary to the many layers of the Collective's practices, they have learned to adapt. Nhà Sàn artist has formed themselves into a band of nomadic creative practitioners

== The Collective ==
=== Nguyen Phuong Linh ===
Nguyen Phuong Linh was born and raised at Nha San studio – the first non-profit studio for experimental art in Vietnam, and perhaps the most prominent art space in Hanoi. Linh has been absorbed in an artistic environment by living among and working with many of the respected contemporary artists of the Vietnamese art scene. She has demonstrated a deep understanding and involvement in the local art community both as an artist and an art organizer.

Phuong Linh's works are sensual, poetic, fragmented, humble and exalted. Her work contemplates upon the visible/invisible truth, form and time and conveys pervasive sense of dislocation. They concern stories that had been forgotten or buried or things that are so insignificant that they never reach our subconscious.

Linh has participated in various exhibitions and art projects in Vietnam, countries in Asia, Europe as well as US, such as Japan, Korea, India, China, Germany, England, France, and Italy. In 2009, she exhibited the first solo exhibition Salt at Galerie Quynh Vietnam. In 2011, Linh participated in 11th Winds of Artist in Residence at Fukuoka Asian Art Museum with a solo exhibition Dust. In 2012 she presented project Home in the exhibition Hinterlands at the Luggage Store Gallery in San Francisco, USA. In 2013, she participated in the large exhibition HIWAR, 25th anniversary of Darat Al Funnun in Amman, Jordan

Since 2010, Linh organized and curated programs at Nha San. She found and organized IN:ACT, the annual international performance art festival in Hanoi. In 2012, she organized Skylines With Flying People, one of the most ambitious contemporary art events in Vietnam in the last decade with local and international artists and curators from Vietnam, Japan, Germany, US, Serbia, Shanghai, and Korea at Japan Foundation, Nha San Studio, Goethe Institute, Manzi Art Space and many public sites in Hanoi. In 2013, together with her colleague Tuan Mami, Linh co-found Nha San COLLECTIVE, a group of young experimental artists.

=== Nguyen Manh Hung ===
Nguyen Manh Hung is a contemporary artist and experimental musician. As an artist, Hung is known for bringing a fresh, original perspective to the visual arts in Vietnam, with an extensive body of work including paintings, sculptures, digital images, installations and performances. Born in 1976 and raised and educated in Hanoi, Nguyen makes art that reflects the comical situations arising from the rapid yet piecemeal processes of domestic urbanization and modernization. As a multi-disciplinary artist, he is equally at ease painting as he is creating large-scale installations or exploring performance art. Nguyen's particular realist style encompasses a distinctive sense of playfulness and humour that sets him apart from previous generations of artists. As the son of a fighter jet pilot, he draws on the personal in his paintings of aircraft. Depicting military planes laden down with oversized grocery items, or else soaring across the sky with bushels from the rice harvest, Hung's surreal scenes humorously morph a symbol of destruction with conduits of hope, benevolence and joy.

Hung has also done the curatorial works at Nha San Studio from 2008 to 2011. As one of Vietnam's most recognized emerging artists, Nguyen Manh Hung has gained increased international attention in recent years. His work was featured in the 7th Asia Pacific Triennial of Contemporary Art at the Queensland Art Gallery | Gallery of Modern Art in Brisbane, Australia. Notable regional and international exhibitions include 'One Planet' at Galerie Quynh, Ho Chi Minh City, Vietnam (2013); 'Living together in paradise' at the Goethe-Institut, Hanoi, Vietnam (2011); 'Tam Ta' at San Art, Ho Chi Minh City (2010); 'Connect: Kunstzene Vietnam' presented by ifa Galleries, Berlin and Stuttgart (2009); 'Lim Dim: Young Vietnamese Artists' at Stenersenmuseet, Oslo (2009); 'transPOP: Korea Vietnam Remix' at ARKO Art Center, Seoul, and Yerba Buena Center for the Arts, San Francisco (2007–2008); and 'Thermocline of Art. New Asian Waves' presented by ZKM Center for Art and Media, Karlsruhe, Germany (2007). In 2014, he was an artist-in-residence at Musee D’Art Contemporain Du Val-de-Marne (MAC/VAL) in France.

=== Tuan Mami ===
Tuan Mami (born 1981, Hanoi) graduated from Hanoi Fine Art University in 2006. Other than being as a creator, he has founded MAC-Hanoi, a Mobile Art Center (2012); Being Co-founder and creative manager of Nha San Collective Art Space in Hanoi since 2013; and Visiting Faculty at San Francisco Art Institute in 2013. Aptly nicknamed Mami, a playful slang word for hustler, Mami is constantly exploring new mediums and methods of expression. Tuan Mami burst into the international art scene for his daring, and increasingly meditative experimentations with installation, video, performance and conceptual art.

In recent years he has begun explorations of interdisciplinary body of work in both private and public places. His works often base on site-specific and re-constructional concept to deal with questions about life, meaning and social interactions between people which re-construct situation into one that engage people or objects from particular reality to enter and involve with the artist in a social process.

He has been recognized for his provocative public performances; site-specific, reconstructional concept's works both within Asia and Europe. He was included in the critically acclaimed exhibition Skyline with Flying People, at the Japan Foundation in Hanoi (2012). He is a recipient of numerous residencies, including San-Art Laboratory in HCMC, Vietnam; Hoyoong performing arts center in South Korea; Tokyo Wonder Site, Tokyo, Japan; The Asia-Europe Art Camp, Casino Luxembourg 2009, and Shanghai, China 2010. Recently he participated in number of internationally art exhibitions include: Pharmacide project traveling between Laos, Vietnam, Cambodia and France 2012; A Crossroads at Institute of Contemporary art Singapore 2011.

=== Nguyen Trinh Thi ===
Nguyen Trinh Thi is a Hanoi-based independent filmmaker and video artist. She studied journalism and photography at the University of Iowa; and international studies and ethnographic film at University of California, San Diego. Her documentary and experimental films have been screened at international festivals and art exhibitions including Oberhausen International Film Festival; Bangkok Experimental Film Festival; Artist Films International; Summer Exhibition 2011, DEN FRIE Centre of Contemporary Art, Copenhagen; Unsubtitled, solo video installation, Nha San Studio, Hanoi; 'PLUS/ Memories and Beyond – 10 Solo Exhibitions by 10 Asian Artists', Kuandu Biennale, Taipei; 'No Soul For Sale 2', Tate Modern, London; and at ZKM Karlsruhe.

Nguyen Trinh Thi founded and directs Hanoi Doclab, a center for documentary filmmaking and video art in Hanoi, in 2009. She has been the main instructor for film-making courses at Doclab for the last three years. Nguyen's works have been screened widely at international festivals and art exhibitions including the Singapore Biennale (2013), Oberhausen International Film Festival, Oberhausen, Germany (2011, 2012); and No Soul For Sale 2 at the Tate Modern, London (2010). In 2009 she founded and still directs Hanoi Doclab, a centre for documentary filmmaking and video art in Hanoi. In 2015 she will be an artist-in-residence at DAAD, Berlin.

=== Nguyen Huy An ===
Born in 1982 in Hanoi and graduated from the Fine Art University in 2008, Nguyen Huy An is considered the most dynamic and innovative artists of his generation. Huy An's work has been a process of trying to dig into the darkness of psychology. Most of these projects have been underlaid with an obsession with memory, with the complexities of a pessimistic perspective.

From installations, performance art to paintings and sculptures, Huy An's works are highly acclaimed by international art critics and curators for their introspective, simple and strong concepts. His personality is reflected in his work. He has appeared, either solo or with the performance art group Phu Luc (Appendix) – which he co-founded in 2010 – in performance art festivals in Vietnam, Japan and Singapore and in important exhibitions such as LIMDIM in Oslo, Norway, Sounds of Dust in 943 Studio Kunming, China and the unprecedented multi-disciplinary exhibition 'Skylines with Flying People' in Hanoi in 2012.

Huy An has participated in a number of exhibitions and performance art festivals including 78 rhythms, Galerie Quynh, Vietnam (2014) and Skylines with Flying People 3 at MoT+++, Vietnam (2016); Disrupted Choreographies, Carré d'Art – Musée d'Art Contemporain, Nîmes, France (2014); If The World Changed, Singapore Biennale (2013); Sounds of dust (somniloquy), 943 Studio Kunming, China (2011)...

=== Vu Duc Toan ===
Vu Duc Toan graduated from Vietnam Fine Art University in 2007. Duc Toan is known for his quiet, thoughtful and metaphoric style of performance. In 2010 Toan found Appendix, a performance collective with 5 other artist friends. Vu Duc Toan is an emerging artist and an independent art critic and was featured on the first bilingual publication about the contemporary artist Vietnam under the name "12 contemporary artists Vietnam"

His works are often based on the simple concept but open to interpretation, focusing on social issues and concerned about the gap between the performance artist and the audience. The participation of the audience is the factor which makes his performances different from other young performance artists in Vietnam. In a workshop in Singapore, Toan asked the audience to chew gum, then he went around to collect the gum and put them back into his mouth. In another work in performing arts festival Sneaky Week (2007), Toan did a performance about bribery, simultaneously challenging the everyday behavior of humans and the conventional thinking of us on consumerism by giving money in an envelope and put the envelope to the seller any items he had bought in the day (be it a breakfast, brush or a sachet)

He participated in various exhibitions, performance art festival in Vietnam and countries in Asia, such as Japan, Korea, China, Cambodia, Singapore... Vu Duc Toan writes and edits for Fine Art Association and Fine Art Magazine since 2005.

=== Phung Tien Son ===
A university dropout, Phung Tien Son wanted to escape the confinement of the rigid and outdated Vietnamese education system to pursue a more experimental and liberal approach to art-making. War, heavy metal rock ’n’ roll, the history of Vietnam – these cover some of the main themes in Tien Son's practice, currently experimented by the artist using various new media means including sound, computer-generated drawing, GPS and Google mapping. Focusing on the undocumented and unannounced war fought at the borders between Vietnam and China in 1979, Tien Son hopes to further explore and shed some light on the ambiguous centuries-long history and relationship between the two Communist neighbours. Although this short but bloody episode – today known as the Third Indochina War – claimed tens of thousands of lives in the space of less than one month, state media on both sides have remained quite despite the mutual tensions which have been flaring in the subsequent years up until now over border disputes and other political problems. His work Soundtracks was exhibited at MoT+++ in Ho Chi Minh City, Vietnam from February to April 2019.

=== Nguyen Tran Nam ===
Nguyen Tran Nam was born in 1979 in Hung Yen and graduated from University of Fine Arts in 2003. Nguyen Tran Nam is known for working with a variety of media, such as installation and sculpture as well as performance art. The artist is concerned with the relationship between man and nature, using this theme throughout his body of work.

Tran Nam is a multi-disciplinary artist who explores through his works an interrogation into the human psyche and modes of behaviour and interaction. Nguyen's works often employ humour as a tool to further expound on the reciprocal influence between human and nature. Selected exhibitions include 'Hinterland', Luggage Store Gallery, San Francisco (2012); 'Gap', Nha San Studio, Hanoi, Vietnam (2010); 'Indefinitely', Ryllega Gallery, Hanoi, Vietnam (2008).

Nguyen Tran Nam's works have many concerns about the feeling of the relationship among human. Nam often uses his own feelings and experience to form his works. His works – being quite pessimistic and cynical – concern with the feelings about relationships between human. He uses his feelings and experiences of his own to form his works. In his recent works, Nam tends to take interest in the dark, hidden and forgotten fraction between the past and presence, faith and retribution, and random tales that hold memory as well as history.

=== Ngyen Ban Ga ===
Ban Ga graduated from Vietnam University of Fine Arts. He co-founded the Hanoi Link, a group of video artists. Ban Ga also experiments with a combination of different formats in artmaking and performance art in a very honest way. In his latest work of "Salted" he stood at beach front for hours as the tide slowly came in, in a very silent way, relating about the connection between the land and the existence of a person. Through his works, Ban Ga shares his passion in collecting the moments of memory and nostalgia. He currently works at Doclab center, documentaries and video art at the Goethe Institute in Hanoi.

=== Nguyen Quoc Thanh ===
Nguyen Quoc Thanh is a Hanoi-based photographer, graduated from the Warsaw University Poland. He co-coordinates and co-organizes "Five Flavours Film Festival" annually in Warsaw since 2007. He is also the director of Queer Forever! festival.

=== Ta Minh Duc ===
Ta Minh Duc was born in 1991, lives and works in Hanoi. He graduated from Hanoi Academy of Theater and Cinema in 2014. Duc wrote and directed his own films. His works questions "existence", expresses skepticism about the relationships in our life, the isolation of human and latent violence. Some of Duc's notable recent projects include: Mini DOCFEST of documentary and experimental films at the Goethe Institute Hanoi in 2014; sound and video installation exhibition ‘Nho va Min’, Nha San Studio in 2014; ‘Autopsy of the Day’ photography exhibition at the Goethe Institute Hanoi, 2012. Duc's film was also screened at the mobile gallery ‘Escape Mobile Gallery’ held by artist Nguyen Tran Nam for ‘Sky lines with flying people’ in Japan Foundation Hanoi, 2012.

=== Truong Que Chi ===
Truong Que Chi is a filmmaker, artist based in Hanoi. She graduated with a master's degree in Film Studies from the University of Paris II Nouvelle Sorbonne. She is a visual artist, film maker. She's the curator of Skylines with Flying People 2015. Through curatorial practices, writings, as well as participation in education, Chi explores Vietnamese landscape of contemporary creative practices. Her works examines the spectacle of the everyday violence in Vietnam.

=== Nguyen Thuy Tien ===
Nguyen Thuy Tien lives and works in HAnoi, Vietnam. She started experimenting with contemporary art in the late months of 2013. She works with various media in visual art, particularly conceptual photography, video art and performance art. Thuy-Tien recently participated in her first residency in Cambodia, November 2013. She also took part in some local and Asian exhibitions and film festivals, including When Time Stand Still (Hanoi), Autospy of days (Hanoi), Deconstructing Memories (Hanoi), Angkor Photo Showcase (Cambodia), I Love My City (Saigon), INACT international performance festival and +15 year Anniversary of Nhasan Studio – performance component; Art residency at San Art, Ha Chi Minh City, Vietnam.

== Activities ==
=== Education ===
Most contemporary artists are taking courses at the School of Fine Arts of Vietnam, created in the 1920s by the French, but the "Fine Arts" only teach traditional techniques and do not offer courses to contemporary art. Contemporary artists from here are so often self-taught. Therefore, curators of local contemporary art scene is neither professional nor really truly international. With Nha San Collective is trying change that gives and also we have established educational programs for the young generation. They invite curators and artists from all backgrounds come to give lectures and workshops with Vietnamese artists.

=== Supporting young and emerging artists ===
Nha San also focuses on searching, nurturing and supporting young artists, art students, or audiences who are passionate about the arts and want to engage more deeply through open calls, volunteering programs, regular training workshops, and opportunities for having open studios or critique sessions.

=== Domestic and international exchange ===
Despite having a late start, Vietnamese contemporary art cannot be separated from the general context of the global art scene. Until today, Nha San Studio (now has become Nha San Collective) has been a bridge for domestic and international art exchange events. Activities such as joint exhibitions, workshops, and seminars provide opportunities for sharing experiences, knowledge, and encouraging artistic practice between artists in many different social, economic and political contexts. It helps building the image of Vietnam as a country of creativity, also, helps Vietnam updating and catching up with the development of the art world. The local partners of Nha San Collective include Hanoi Creative City, Goethe Institut, Manzi Art Space, Japan Foundation, Korean Center, Chula, Laca, Art Vietnam Gallery etc. Also Nha San Collective is in the process of building relationships with universities (University of Social Sciences and Humanities, Hanoi University of Culture etc.) and the Museums (National History Museum, Art Museum).

== See also ==
- List of Vietnamese artists
