= Nguyễn Huy An =

- Born: 1982 (age 43–44); Hanoi, Vietnam
- Occupation: Contemporary artist

Nguyễn Huy An (born 1982) is a Vietnamese contemporary artist based in Hanoi.

Nguyễn Huy An's work is a sedimentation of emotion, memory, and isolation. It seeks to make connections between the darkness of psychology that induces an obsession with memory and pessimistic psyches of human behavior. In his practice, Huy An has his signature way of minimal expression, using dark materials from everyday life associated with memories and personal experiences. They reflect the contemplation of the artist on the position or relation of human power with the outside world, examine and deconstruct the sizes of significant images or concepts with a patient, delicate and meticulous approach. From installations, performance art to paintings and sculptures, Huy An's works are noted with introspective, simple and strong concepts. Nguyen's artworks reflect his intricate poetic journey trying to trace the ways to his thoughts, akin to the endless osmosis of groundwater sources accumulating in a well while the well's surface rests subtly.

== Life ==
As the son of an artist, Nguyễn Huy An grew up expressing himself materially. It was after his introduction to installation and performance that his work took on the strong character it has today, where he explores the dark and quiet spaces of his childhood and brings them out into the light.

He graduated from the Fine Art University in 2008. In 2010 Huy An co-founded the performance art collective The Appendix Group (Phu Luc) with artists Vu Duc Toan and Hoang Minh Duc.

== Work ==
=== Paintings ===
The pond - which appears in every village in the North of Vietnam, which is consolidated and stagnant - is an important allegory of Northern Vietnamese for their profoundness yet self-contained and isolated at the same time. Above and reflecting on the pond is the "water-temple", where Huy An spent most of his childhood playing around and observing villagers' activities, such as worshipping, festival, and community gatherings. The pond's stagnancy consolidates into minimalist form, stands still as a Buddha figure.

=== Installations ===
==== Hair on the table (2005) ====
For this work, Huy An collected tangled hair, brushed them straight, then roll them together again, like the gigantic heavy hair ball. The tangled hair is described as the poetic residue of the middle aged and older Vietnamese women, but at the same time symbolizes their tottery against daily social pressure.

==== The Great Puddle (2009) ====
The Great Puddle was made with carved wooden plate in the shape of a table, filled with ink. It recalls the stagnancy of village's pond, yet here rather as stagnant bureaucracy as the table is also allegory of officers' position in the governmental system.

==== 1120 Footsteps K (2012) ====
In 1120 Footsteps K, Huy An laid paper on the surface of 1120 footsteps of Keangnam Building, the highest building in Vietnam. Then he folded them into a stack of paper. Here he approached its core with its most opposite characteristic: the basic low footstep of the stair.

==== 78 Bridge spans V (2012) ====
In this work, Huy An laid a small tape band on each span of Vĩnh Tuy Bridge, the longest bridge in Vietnam. After 1 month, he collected tapes on 78 spans and arranged them in precise order of the spans. The dust on the tape naturally changed color shades, recorded very slight yet existing difference of geographical length and distance.

==== A Ă Â ... (2014) ====
A Ă Â ... is the collection of 29 alphabetical letters with 6 tones of Vietnamese script, carefully extracted from the propaganda slogans drawn on the walls in villages. This act is a removal of word structure, bringing the letters back to its basic linguistic origin, before they were used to construct a political meaning. Yet the letters still bear their historical traces on their surfaces. The slogans were left as a speech defected statements.

==== Study of The Flunctuation of a Shadow (2014) ====
This piece is inspired by the undeniable significance of Lenin as a political figure in the history of the country and specifically in Hanoi. The large shadow cast by the East- facing Statue of Lenin acts as a direct reference to the influence of this political thinker on the land of Vietnam. Measured during the spring equinox, the shadow exists as an entity out of the interaction between the natural (the sun and the spinning the earth) and the unnatural (the concrete form of the statue). Working with a mathematician to determine the area of Lenin's shadow at different times of the day and consolidated into a mathematical equation, Huy An reflects on the way our logic, ideals and worldviews have always been contained and impacted by natural forces beyond our control.

=== Performance ===
Nguyen Huy An's performances are often quiet and intense, sometimes physically demanding. He has performances either solo or with the performance art group Phu Luc (Appendix) in important exhibitions such as Frozen Rain at Nha San Studio, Future of Imagination in Singapore Sounds Of Dust in 943 Studio Kunming, China; LIMDIM in Oslo, Norway, and the unprecedented multi-disciplinary exhibition "Skylines with Flying People" in Hanoi in 2012.

== Exhibitions ==
Nguyen Huy An had his solo shows 78 rhythms - Galerie Quynh, Ho Chi Minh City (2014) He participated in group shows including 14th Istanbul Biennial - International Istanbul Biennial, Istanbul (2015), Mien Meo Mieng / Contemporary Art from Vietnam - Bildmuseet, Umeå (2015), Chorégraphies suspendues - Carré d´art - Musée d´art contemporain de Nîmes, Nîmes (2014), If The World Changed - Singapore Biennale, Singapore (2013), Lim Dim - Young Vietnamese Artists - The Stenersen Museum, Oslo (2009), Nippon International Performance Art Festival (NIPAF), Tokyo, Japan (2007)
