= Công Quốc Hà =

Vietnamese artist and lacquer painter

- Born: Công Quốc Hà; 29 October 1955; Hanoi, Vietnam
- Died: 22 December 2024 (aged 69); Hanoi, Vietnam
- Known for: Painting
- Spouse: Pham Le Hang

Công Quốc Hà (born 29 October 1955, died 22 December 2024) was an acclaimed Vietnamese artist and lacquer painter. He was born in Hanoi in 1955 and graduated from the Hanoi Industrial Fine Arts College.

Cong Quoc Ha is one of the most active and well-known Vietnamese lacquer painters. He "is well known for his elegant female figures”.

== Education and work ==
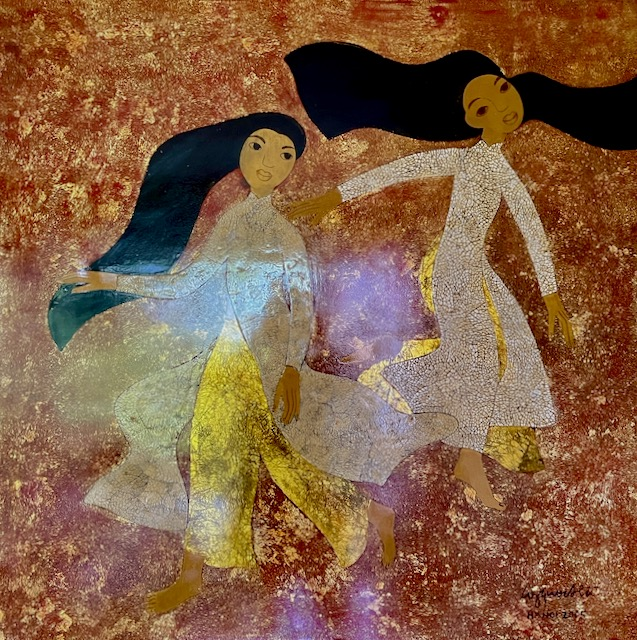
Công Quốc Hà, "Two Sisters," lacquer on wood with eggshell, 2005, 100 x 100 cm (private collection))

Since graduating from the Hanoi Industrial Fine Arts University, his works are shown in hundreds of exhibitions worldwide, including international fairs such as the Documenta in Germany, the Euro D'Art in Geneva as well as in international exhibitions from Buenos Aires to New York, Paris, Singapore, Tokyo and Melbourne. He also received numerous awards for his works worldwide. He was also responsible for the first nude exhibition in Vietnam, in 1992, where he had 20 paintings at the show.

Between 1995 and 2000 he served as Deputy Secretary General of Hanoi Fine Arts Association, and he was Chairman of the Young Painter Club, Vietnam Fine Art Association between 1995 and 1999. He heads the Hanoi branch of the Vietnam Fine Arts Association between 2010 and 2014.

In 2005, Cong Quoc Ha founded the HANOI ART HOUSE in Kisa, Sweden together with his daughter Cong Nu Hoang Anh. The Art House shows collections and exhibitions of art and cultural works, especially about the Vietnamese culture. After 2012, Cong Quoc Ha worked and lived together with his wife and son in Sweden.

== Private life ==
In 1980, Cong Quoc Ha married the artist Pham Le Hang (born 1960). The couple had three children:

- Cong Nu Hoang Anh (daughter, born 1981, Hanoi-Vietnam), lives and works in Sweden
- Cong Quoc Long (son, born 1988, Hanoi-Vietnam), lives in Sweden
- Cong Nu Thuy Trang (daughter, born 1990, Hanoi-Vietnam), lives and works in Switzerland

== Awards ==
- 1978: Metropolitan Fine Arts Exhibition, Hanoi Fine Arts Association.
- 1983: Graphic Arts Book Printing, Ministry of Culture.
- 1985: Illustration Graphic Arts Exhibition, “Van Nghe Magazine” and Vietnam Fine Art Association.
- 1995: Metropolitan Fine Arts Exhibition, Hanoi Fine Arts Association.
- 1996: Young Artists Exhibition I, Sweden Fund for Cultural Peroration Exhibition of Prizewinning Painting, Hanoi Area, Vietnam Association of Fine Arts Quinquennial Literature & Arts Association.
- 2000: Medal for Vietnam Fine Arts Cultural Career
- 2003: Medal for Vietnam Fine Arts Career
