= Dinh Q. Lê =

Vietnamese American multimedia artist (1968–2024)

- Born: 1968; Hà Tiên, South Vietnam
- Died: 6 April 2024 (aged 56); Ho Chi Minh City, Vietnam
- Education: University of California, Santa Barbara (BFA); School of Visual Arts (MFA)
- Occupation: Multimedia artist
- Years active: 1990s–2024
- Notable work: "Mot Coi Di Ve" (1999), "The Farmers and the Helicopters" (2010), Photo-weaving series
- Website: https://www.instagram.com/dinhq.le/

Dinh Q. Lê (Vietnamese: Lê Quang Đỉnh; 1968 – 6 April 2024) was a Vietnamese American multimedia artist, best known for his photography work and photo-weaving technique. Many of his works consider the Vietnam War, known as the American War in his native country, as well as methods of memory and how it connects to the present. Other series of his, such as his From Hollywood to Vietnam, explore the relation of pop culture to personal memory and the difference between history and its portrayals in media. In 2009, the Wall Street Journal described him as "one of the world's most visible Vietnamese contemporary artists".

== Life and education ==
Lê was born in 1968 in Hà Tiên, a Vietnamese town near the Cambodia border. The Cambodian-Vietnamese War of the 1970s brought Khmer Rouge troops to the region. When he was ten, in 1978, his family escaped. When the journey began, Lê was accompanied by his six siblings and his mother. However, while the ten year-old Lê made it safely onto the boat along with his mother, his other siblings did not. In an interview published in a catalogue for one of his exhibitions, he recalled the story of the escape. It was a "desperate run for freedom," and he said that he "[would] never forget the look on his mother's face as she scoured the beach...for signs of her eldest sons and daughter". After a year-long stay in Thailand, the family eventually moved across the ocean and settled in Los Angeles.

After Lê received BFA degree in photography from University of California, Santa Barbara, he began his own career as an artist. He began to weave photos, inspired by the grass-mat weaving lessons he had from his aunt when he was a child. He earned his MFA degree from The School of Visual Arts in New York. By 2005, he was living primarily in Ho Chi Minh City, though he did not exhibit there due to the requirement to apply for a government permit.

During his first weeks returning to Vietnam, Lê was reminded him of his Việt kiều roots, of being treated as a foreigner, noting, "I had a romantic notion that I was still a Vietnamese but I was too Americanized. I felt disconnected and lost but I kept returning again to Vietnam". This experience, similar to his arrival to the United States, leads to Lê's journey of “re-learning how to be Vietnamese”. Lê also spoke of never feeling fully comfortable living in the U.S., "a country that he said had invented, for its own purposes, an image of Vietnam that did not jibe with reality". Following regular visits to Vietnam in the 1990s, Lê eventually made Ho Chi Minh City his home.

Lê was also a collector of Vietnamese art and antiques. On collecting objects and memorabilia, Lê stated: "I started collecting with a desire to reclaim my identity as a Vietnamese," and that "collecting, and learning the cultural histories that are embedded in the objects I found, was a way of reclaiming my heritage, my identity".

He died from a stroke at his home in Ho Chi Minh City on 6 April 2024, at the age of 56.

== Art career ==
Untitled (1) (1998) at the Washington Convention Center in 2022

Much of Lê's work explores "the narrative of loss" and the traumas of war.

Having grown up in the U.S. and seeing Western-centric portrayal of Vietnam, Lê's works often focus on unheard stories, revealing "a more complex understanding of Vietnamese identity – beyond that of an extra in American war movies". Initially, Lê "really tried to suppress the memories," before watching these films. Lê casts "a critical eye on the role of the media and photography in constructing biased narratives of the Vietnam War," and "shreds historic photographs and interlaces the pieces" to create "tapestries that tell a different story".

In 2007, Lê co-founded the non-profit art space Sàn Art (Ho Chi Minh City) along with Tiffany Chung and Tuan Andrew Nguyen and Phunam Thuc Ha of The Propeller Group. In 2018, he curated Guerilla Tactics, a solo show of contemporary ceramics by the artist Nguyen Quoc Chanh at MoT+++ in Ho Chi Minh City, Vietnam.

=== Photo-weaving and photograph-based works ===
In his early work, by weaving strips of photos together using a planting procedure, Lê created large-scale photographic montages. He stated that it was inspired by his aunt's technique of weaving mats out of grass, an approach which Lê describes "were really about me trying to locate my place in America, in the West". In this technique, images are layered in a repetition of patterning with glossy tapestries made entirely out of type C prints. Linen tape is used to finish the edges. Reviewing a show of these works in 1998, "The Headless Buddha," Claudine Ise of Los Angeles Times described it as "mind-blowing" and "amazingly intricate".

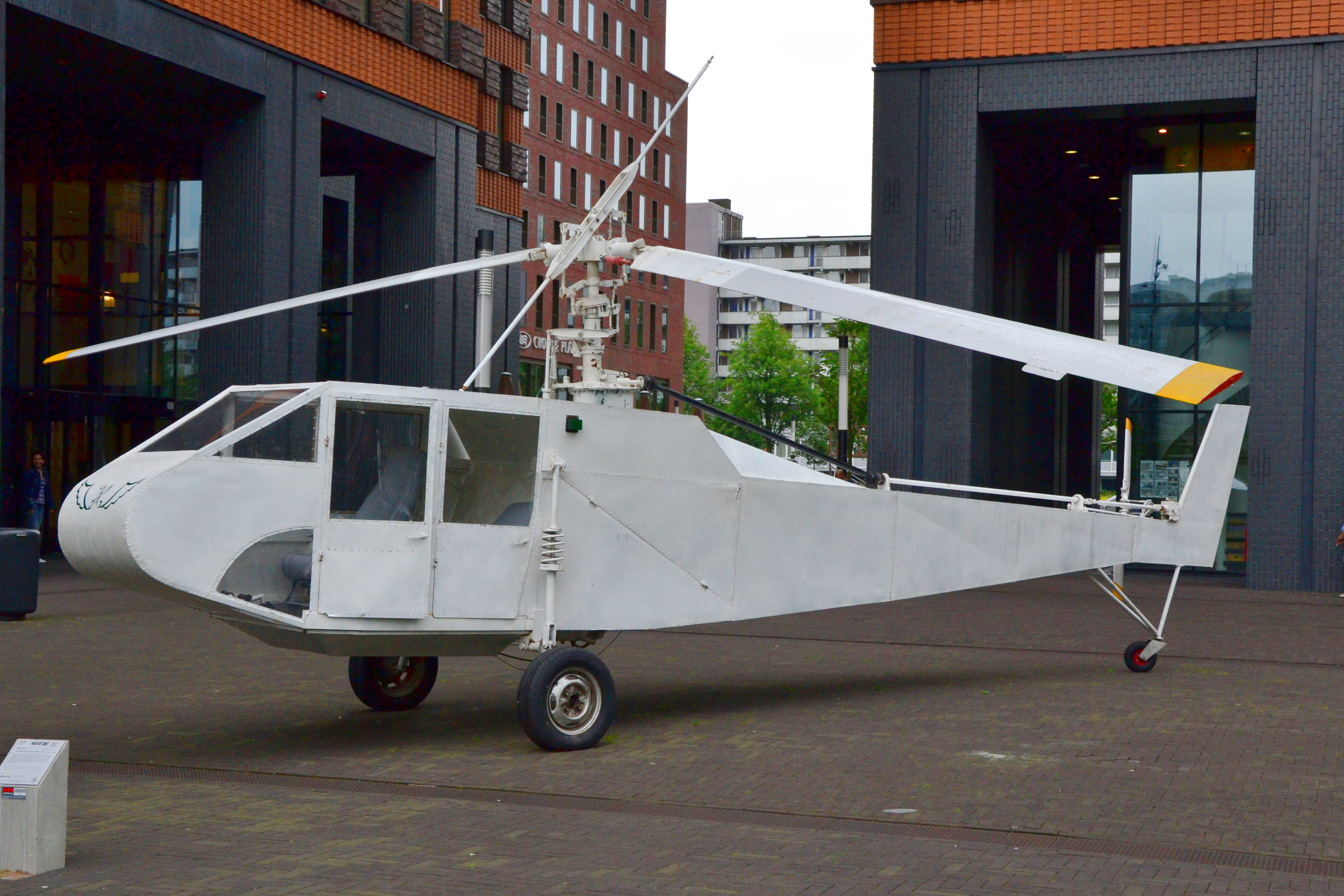
The helicopter from the video installation The Farmers and the Helicopters (2006)

==== Mot Coi Di Ve ====
In 1999, Lê had his first major success with "Mot Coi Di Ve," a work in which he interwove thousands of photographs into a quilt. He took the title of the work from a popular Vietnamese song, "Spending One's Life Trying to Return Home". By 2014, the New York Times was reporting that Lê's collages were selling for $50,000 to $60,000 apiece.

In 2005, a small exhibition of Lê's photographic collages was shown by the Asia Society. Art critic Ken Johnson of the New York Times gave the exhibition a mixed review, stating that some works had "an affecting emotional urgency," but also criticizing what he saw as Lê's "susceptibility to overly literal or obvious ideas."

==== The Scrolls ====
Scrolls (2013) with digitally distorted images of Vietnam War: Thich Quang Duc, a monk who self-immolated in protest against the treatment of Buddhists; Phan Thi Kim Phuc, the girl photographed running naked after napalm bombs attack of her South Vietnamese village; General Ngyuen Ngoc Loan, a South Vietnamese national police commander executing a Viet Cong prisoner; and women and children in great distress after the massacre of civilians by US troops. These 127 x 5000 cm scrolls drape down the wall and collapse into stacked rolls, giving the installations a sculpture-like appearance. Lê’s use of a scroll evokes the traditions of Chinese landscape paintings, narrating "the cumulative story of an event by virtue of the length of the scroll on which it was painted, and reversing Henri Cartier-Bresson’s notion of the “precise moment.”

For WTC in Four Moments, Lê created a four-channel video work with sound, depicting the World Trade Center in four stages: before, during, and after the collapse, and during the rebuilding. Lê first printed 200 metre-long stretched digital images, that he used to create a six minute video of each, removing "all iconic connotations associated with September 11th, leaving the viewer to reconsider the events as a slow progression of moments that led to a cataclysmic trauma and the newly built One World Trade Center.

The Deep Blue Sea (2017) adapted images from the boat refugee crises in the Mediterranean Sea; as well as Hollywood stills of the wars and conflicts in Vietnam and Cambodia.

==== Crossing the Farther Shore ====
Composed of thousands of images from Lê’s photographic collection, he creates seven seemingly weightless rectangular structures resembling the mosquito nets that refugees like Lê slept under in camps. Lê created what he calls “a sleeping, dreaming memory of Vietnam,” by stitching together canopies which "offers a new image of the country no longer stricken by conflict and war, but filled with love, possibility, and hope".

=== Video installations ===
==== From Father To Son: A Rite of Passage (2009) ====
From Father to Son: A Rite of Passage, a two-channel video made from splicing together scenes of Martin Sheen and Charlie Sheen as soldiers in Vietnam War movies Platoon and Apocalypse Now, filmed 7 years apart. The work "deconstructs and juxtaposes the performances" by uniting "father and son as actors to continually replay the trauma and futility of the Vietnam War". Le noted, "the fictional and nonfictional father to son relationship was compelling. In Platoon, the real son of Martin Sheen, Charlie, seemed somewhat to replicate his father’s role; Charlie had to become a soldier to understand his father".

==== The Farmers and the Helicopters (2012) ====
The New York Museum of Modern Art exhibited Lê's video exhibition "The Farmers and the Helicopters" in 2010, a three-channel video of Vietnam War scenes and interviews with Vietnamese people, which Lê describes is very much like his photo-weaving works. The collaborative installation with Phunam Thuc Ha and Tuan Andrew Nguyen of The Propeller Group, included a working helicopter built from scratch by Le Van Danh, a farmer, and Tran Quoc Hai, a self-taught mechanic. The installation transformed an object of war to "an object of hope, of resilience," "representing individual determination and community-building," providing "an opportunity for contemplation of the significance and symbolism of a charged object". For the Vietnamese public, it also symbolised the "urgent sense to move, to forward, up and to overcome".

Holland Cotter of The New York Times noted that it appeared to be the museum's most popular exhibit when he visited, and described it as "a visually tight and ideologically porous weave of fact and fiction, memory and illusion, with the elements of each pair in constant, volatile interchange." Lê later noted that, "his [Mr. Tran's] dream awoke other people, awoke the Vietnamese, because we've been working so hard to rebuilding the country, that, I think we forgot to dream," and by seeing the self-built helicopter, "people remembered what it's like to dream again". The installation was acquired for MoMA's permanent collection.

In 2015, his video installations were the subject of a retrospective at the Mori Art Museum in Tokyo, which included "Everything Is a Re-Enactment" (2015) focusing on post-WWII in Japan. As well as marking the 40th anniversary of the end of the Vietnam War and the 70th anniversary of Japan's defeat in WWII, it was his first large-scale museum show in Asia, and the first time the museum had given a large solo show to an artist from Southeast Asia.

==== Light and Belief / Ánh sáng Niềm tin (2012) ====
Another of Lê's video exhibitions, "Light and Belief" (2012) ("Ánh sáng Niềm tin") commissioned by dOCUMENTA (13), juxtaposed approximately 100 watercolors by Vietnamese soldiers commissioned as front-line artists during the war, with interviews that Lê conducted with them. The work includes a strong curatorial component, a shift in Lê's practice. "Light and Belief" was exhibited at Documenta (a quinquennial exhibition in Kassel, Germany) in 2012 and again at the Asia Society in 2017.

==== The Colony (2016) ====
Lê filmed the islands from a boat, a bird's eye view and by using a drone for "The Colony" (2016), a five-channel video installation with three projections and two monitors. The Colony is the first of Lê’s film installations which does not directly reference the Vietnam War, and marks a significant development in his practice. Featuring newly filmed footage, based on a cluster of islands off the west coast of Peru, Lê’s narratives touch on aspects of the islands’ history including the nineteenth century imperial wars between Spain and its former colonies Peru and Chile; and the US Guano Act of 1856 that claimed over one hundred uninhabited islands, reefs and atolls in the Pacific and Atlantic. Lê notes that "it's not Vietnam War, but it's connected to Vietnam in many ways," and the individuals caught up in the currents of history remains as a central theme of The Colony. Weaving the past and the present together to deliver a film disclosing today’s various and dissimulated forms of imperialism, Lê noted, “it’s kind of similar to what China is doing in the South China Sea [...] The U.S. wanted guano, and the Chinese want control of the energy resources and waterways. It’s just history repeating itself.”

==== The Imaginary Country ====
For his first video work, Lê explored the idea of departure, a crucial moment in the diaspora experience "when one leaves, sometimes abruptly and sometimes by force, to venture into the unknown," as well as the "sometimes difficult yet equally courageous act of return". The Imaginary Country is a multichannel video of a scene Lê originally stumbled upon shortly after he moved back to Vietnam in 1997. Lê connects a his past with the present, "recalling his own traumatic experience of leaving the country by walking to a boat at sea".

=== Public projects ===
==== Damaged Gene (1998) ====
To highlight the topic of Agent Orange and its ongoing impacts in Vietnam, which at the time was less-discussed, Lê staged a pop-up exhibition kiosk in the Central Market in Ho Chi Minh City, with toys and clothing designed for conjoined twins, that questioned the "socially constructed perceptions of purity and impurity, of acceptance and rejection." In opting against the traditional gallery setting, Lê had arranged with a kiosk owner to use her store for a month. The kiosk setting created interactions and discussions between Lê and his audience, and "their interactions to serve as a replacement for the typical artist statement often seen in galleries or museums".

The installation has been in multiple exhibitions internationally, and an exhibition in Berlin, including "little plastic dolls with deformed bodies, pacifiers with two teats, and children's clothes with two collars, bearing the logos of the companies that produced Agent Orange," were described "the most expressive piece in the exhibition".

==== The Ties That Bind (2024) ====
In what Lê described was a completely new challenge, he collaboratively created the quilt installation "The Ties That Bind" for Ichihara Lakeside Museum, working with Japanese, Vietnamese and people from various countries. The concepts of the installation were based on interviews Lê conducted that provided him with deeper understanding on people's connections and their longing for families back home. Lê stated: "I came up with the idea, but I did not move my hands at all. It was really a collaborative work created by the Vietnamese and Ichihara communities. It is a completely new challenge for me".

== Selected solo exhibitions ==
- 2023 – Dinh Q. Lê: Fragile Springs, University of New Hampshire Museum of Art, Durham, NH, US
- 2022 – Photographing the thread of memory, musée du quai Branly, Paris, France
- 2021 – Monuments and Memorials, Elizabeth Leach Gallery, Portland, OR
- 2019 – Pure Land, Tang Contemporary Art Bangkok, Bangkok, Thailand
- 2018-2019 – Dinh Q. Lê: True Journey is Return, San Jose Museum of Art, San Jose, CA, US
- 2018 - Dinh Q. Lê: Monuments and Memorials, at STPI Gallery, Singapore
- 2017 - The Colony, at Museum Boijmans Van Beuningen, Rotterdam, Netherlands
- 2015 – Dinh Q. Lê: Memory for Tomorrow at Mori Art Museum, Tokyo, Japan
- 2010–2011 – Projects 93: Dinh Q. Lê at The Museum of Modern Art, New York, NY, US
- 2000 - Project Series 6 Dinh Q. Lê at Benton Museum of Art, Claremont, CA, US

== Awards ==
- National Endowment for the Arts Fellowship in Photography 1994
- The Dupont Fellowship in 1994
- The Aaron Siskind Fellowship in 1992
- The Prince Claus Fund Award in 2010
- Bellagio Creative Arts Fellowship, Rockefeller Foundation, New York in 2014

== Interviews and public discussions ==
- Tradition Today: Contemporary Craft and Storytelling, with Heri Dono, S.E.A. Focus (2024)
- Dinh Q. Lê – Cambodia Reamker, Elizabeth Leach Gallery (2023)
- Dinh Q. Lê In Conversation: Crossing the Farther Shore, National Gallery Singapore (2023)
- Talk with | Trò chuyện cùng Dinh Q. Lê, Nguyen Art Foundation (2023)
- Visite guidée de l'exposition | Dinh Q. Lê, le fil de la mémoire et autres photographies, Musée du quai Branly - Jacques Chirac (2022)
- Artist Dinh Q. Lê & Curator Rory Padeken, In Conversation, Elizabeth Leach Gallery (2021)
- Studio Visit with Dinh Q. Le, Nguyen Art Foundation (2021)
- APT5 / Dinh Q Lê discusses his art practice, QAGOMA (2018)
- Dinh Q. Lê: Monuments and Memorials, STPI Creative Workshop & Gallery (2018)
- Dinh Q. Le Interview - Post Vidai Collection, Post Vidai (2017)
- The Colony: Dinh Q. Lê in conversation with James Lingwood, Artangel (2016)
- Dinh Q. Le Lecture, Western Washington University (2016)
- Dinh Q. Lê’s “Memory for Tomorrow” at the Mori Art Museum, Blouin Artinfo (2015)
- "Dinh Q. Lê: Memory for Tomorrow" Audio Guide, Mori Art Museum (2015)
- Dinh Q. Lê: Crossing the Farther Shore, Walley Films (2014)
- Agent Orange Aftermath - Artist Dinh Q. Le - Vietnam: The Secret Agent, Human Arts Association (2011)
- Behind the Scenes: Projects 93: Dinh Q. Lê, The Museum of Modern Art (2010)
