= Tuấn Mami =

Artist

Tuan Mami (born 1981) is a Vietnamese conceptual artist based in Hanoi. Tuan Mami's works are often based on site-specific and re-constructional concepts to deal with questions about art, life, meaning and social interactions between people. Constantly exploring new mediums and methods of expression, Tuan Mami is known for his daring, and increasingly meditative experimentations with installation, video, performance and conceptual art.

== Life ==
Tuan Mami graduated from Hanoi Fine Art University in 2006. He was Visiting Faculty at San Francisco Art Institute in 2013. He founded MAC-Hanoi, a Mobile Art Center in 2012 and co-founded of Nha San Collective in 2013 - a group of young artists who dedicate ourselves to pushing boundaries for freedom of expression within the Vietnam context in relation to globalization.

== Work ==
=== In One’s Breath Nothing Stands Still (2017) ===
Tuan Mami's In One's Breath Nothing Stands Still (2014-2017), which Framer Framed presented for the Intersections programme of Art Rotterdam in 2017. The multimedia installation is a product of several years of research by the artist into the pollution, loss of biodiversity, and disruption of local culture in Hà Nam, Vietnam caused by years of exploitative stone mining. The subject is an intimate one for the artist because Hà Nam is also his hometown. In One's Breath manifests a sort of post-apocalyptic scene that balances between stillness and movement, truth and imagination – it is at once reality and a haunting dream. The disjunctions held together in the space come from Tuan Mami's own thoughts of his hometown, as he observes its transition from the paradise of his childhood to a site of exploitation.

=== Myth in East Mist (2015) ===
Myth in East Mist is a project based on research about the Vietnamese community in South Korea, where about 65,000 multicultural Vietnamese–Korean families live. Most of the families consist of Vietnamese brides who have come to South Korea to marry a Korean man. Many brides bring their mothers from Vietnam to stay with them, most of which cannot speak Korean, have no friends, and remain isolated. This artwork is a way of remedying dismissed cultures, pressures from non-stop journeying to find a better life, and of filling the borders between geographical gaps, spaces, times and different cultures. To express feelings such as absence, love or remembrance, Tuan Mami chose to use the ritual and hobby of knitting - inspired by a lot of stories and old myths of Vietnamese women who stayed quiet and lonely waiting for their beloved ones to come back home from the battle zone safely. These were women who knitted sweaters and scarves to send to their men as a symbol of protection and as a love message. By utilizing the old myths, Tuan Mami creates a platform in the gallery space for Vietnamese women in South Korea where they not only enact a knitting ritual, but also where they can meet each other and share their stories.

=== Physicality (2013) ===
The artwork is based on research done at Room 1, Nha San Collective space at Zone 9, Hanoi - the former Central Pharmaceutical Factory II, which originated from Army Medical Department Pharmaceutical Factory (established in 1947 with the purpose of producing medicines for the army). The permeation of perennial chemicals makes the room reeked of medicines and it is deeply ingrained in the humid walls, creating a haunting atmosphere about life, death and the invisible existence of the physical world. Tuan Mami chose the most suitable cacti to grow in boxes filled with of humid wall mortar from Room 1 itself to and then put the cacti there right in the room. Through the retention and transformation of material, the material itself becomes a historical existence.

=== The Utopia (2012) ===
Tuan Mami covered Japan Foundation Library floor with 100 kg of rice seeds and a thick sheet of glass. This installation created a field of rice - an “utopia” within a normal library. The pressed rice seeds by glass gradually grew day by day even without water and soil throughout the exhibition duration. The visitors might paradoxically feel the freedom of the rice plants that grow in such difficult conditions as well as the risky and impossible temptation of touching to feel the rice plant. In the exhibition opening, Tuan Mami invited his mother to be an art tour guide and invited 100 of her female friends to come to visit the exhibition. It was the first time in their life to see an art exhibition. The artworks re-constructs the relationship between different generations, between audience-art-artist-artspace, re-analyzes the definition of social view while dig into the structure of an artwork.

=== 1000 Art Objects Which Have Lost Their Context (2012) ===
Inspired by the questions: What is art? What have artists used to present their art practice? Tuan Mami made a book classifying daily life/art objects. He chose single images of things that exist around us and that are in our lives, then separated them from their context and reproduce them on transparency paper. All the images represent the temporality of life, of culture, and of the worlds surrounding our life.

=== Protest Against The Void No.2 ===
The work includes an Artist, a Gallerist, a Couple, and a Young man. They are anonymous actors with particular actions. The audience is directed to go through an art manifesto made by rice powder, a hidden masturbating man, a hidden couple having sex, a young man who fighting intensely with the void corner by using chilly powder. In the performance, Tuan Mami created a sort of mysterious space but with a realistic orientation. An ambiguous play drives people to the zone of knowing and unknowing.

== Exhibitions ==
Tuan Mami has participated in international art events and exhibitions including UnAuthorised Medium, Framer Framed, the Netherlands (2018) Intersections, Art Rotterdam, the Netherlands (2017), Plastic Myths, Asian Culture Center, Korea (2015) Changwon Sculpture Biennale (2014); Pharmacide Project, Traveling Between Laos, Vietnam, Cambodia, And France (2012) ; Beyond Pressure; Burma (2011), The 7th Asia-Europe Art Camp – Art Workshop Luxembourg/Shanghai (2009-2010); Institute of Contemporary art in Singapore(2011); A Crossroads At The Institute Of Contemporary Art Singapore (2011); Utopia, Japan Foundation, Hanoi, (2012); Celebration Of Our Moment And Farewell Party, Halle 6, Munich (2011); And What Is Mom Waiting For?, Hooyong Art Center, South Korea (2011); Hà nội- Berlin, Berlin(2009). He has been an artist-in-residence at Hoyoong performing arts center in South Korea, Tokyo Wonder Site, Tokyo; Organhaus Art Space, China, Casino Luxembourg, Luxembourg; 934 Studio, China; Sàn Art, Vietnam
