= Trương Công Tùng =

Visual artist from Vietnam

Trương Công Tùng (born 1986 in Đăk Lăk) is a visual artist who lives and works in Ho Chi Minh City, Vietnam.

== Life and work ==
He graduated from Ho Chi Minh City Fine Arts University in 2010, specializing in lacquer painting. His works include experiments in shaping, such as the use of paint on different materials to achieve a variety of effects. In addition to The sky, the sea (San Art, Vietnam), he also exhibited works in other places such as Himiko Café or Ho Chi Minh City Fine Arts Association. In recent years, he has expanded his practice to materials such as video and installation. Tung finds inspiration from spiritual culture, oral history and micro history to include works referring to the change of society, ethnic, religious and political problems.

== Exhibitions ==
He has participated in a number of exhibitions inside and outside the country including the Taipei Biennale 2016, Umeå, Sweden, SeMA Biennale Mediacity Seoul 2014, Haunted Thresholds (Göttingen, Germany), South by Southeast (Osage Art Foundation, Hong Kong), Collectibles House (Hanoi), Seoul Museum of Art (SeMA biennale) Korea, Koganecho Bazzar (Yokohama, Japan). Additionally he participated in The 11th Asia Pacific Triennial of Contemporary Art (2025) with his piece A Disorientated Garden (Khu Vườn Lạc Hướng, 2024) on display at Queensland Art Gallery of Modern Art (QAGOMA, Australia).

== Solo exhibitions ==
- Fictive Communities Asia, Koganego Bazaar, Yokohama, Japan, (2014)
- Above the Sky. Under the Sea, San-Art, Ho Chi Minh City (2011)

== Group exhibitions ==
- SeMA Biennale Mediacity, Seoul (2014); Unconditional Belief, San-Art, Ho Chi Minh City (2014)
- The Glimmer That We See/ Vietnam, FreeS Art Space, Taipei (2014)
- The Festival of Independents, Charlie Dutton Gallery, London (2013)
- Destruo, Nha San Collective, Hanoi (2013) and South Country, South of Country, Zerostation, Vietnam & Outsiders
