= Nguyễn Phương Linh =

Vietnamese artist

- Born: 1985 (age 40–41); Hanoi, Vietnam
- Occupations: Conceptual artist, curator
- Known for: Installation art, sculpture, video art

Nguyễn Phương Linh (born 1985) is a Vietnamese multidisciplinary conceptual artist. Phương Linh's practice spans installation, sculpture and video. Her work conveys the sense of the alienation, the dislocation and the ephemerality of human life. She is concerns about geographic cultural shift, traditional roots and fragmented history in Vietnam – a complex nexus of ethnicities, religions, and cultural and geo-political influences. Phương Linh often travels, field researches and collects artifacts from historical sites of exchange and borders. She transforms these materials in order to construct alternative perspectives and interpretations to fragmented histories and personal narratives.

== Life ==
Nguyễn Phương Linh was born in 1985, in Hanoi, Vietnam. She was raised in Nha San Studio, located in Long Biên district in Hanoi, the first alternative artist-run space for experimental art in Vietnam that was co-found by her father and based in their home. Phương Linh's artistic sensibility and curiosity was developed through dialogue and interaction many of Vietnam's most respected artists, writers and composers.

Since the closure of Nha San Studio due to authority, Phương Linh has organized various mobile as well as large scale projects for Nha San artists in Vietnam and abroad. In 2013 she co-founded Nha San Collective, a group of local artists who were dedicated to pushing and examining traditional, local and global socio-political contexts and history. Nha San Collective supports each other in pushing the boundaries of expression in Vietnam as well as seeks and nurtures other young artists in the community with or without a physical space.

== Work ==
=== Sanctified Clouds (2012–2015) ===
Sanctified Clouds (2012–2015) is a wall installation of a series of photographs collected from the internet, cropping off the landscapes and violent scenes and leaving only the dust and smoke of explosions and war. It brings out a sense of glorious power, despite being the symbol of destructive weaponry. From afar, the smoke looks like the neutral clouds, but in close-up view, it is the representation of power.

=== Home project (2012) ===
In Home project (2012), Phương Linh's father shipped her iron wood from the floor of a Catholic church and windows from a Mental hospital in the North Vietnam to Oakland. The wood was transported same way that American Government sent the first container of weapon, medicine, food... to Vietnam in 1967 and Phương Linh made a boat out of that.

=== Dust project (2011–2012) ===
For the Dust project (2011–2012), Phương Linh collected dust from various places and objects such as: Long Bien bridge, the first steel bridge in Hanoi that was built by the French in 1887, a bomb shelter in an old house in Japan, the border between North and South Korea, Oakland port (USA) that shipped the first container of weapon to Vietnam, etc...All objects and spaces where the dust was from were documented and printed by blue print in Japan.

=== Salt project (2009) ===
In Salt project (2009), inspired by the salt villages of northern Vietnam. Phương Linh made installations from unrefined, handmade salt. Phương Linh conceived of this work as the act creating a minimal landscape in space. The sculpture is intended to dematerialize while it is on view. As the water evaporates, the salt begins to crumble and dissolve, its disappearing form symbolizing the way that events in history may slip away from memory or exist only as fragmented forms in our minds.

== Exhibitions ==
In 2009, she exhibited the first solo exhibition Salt at Galerie Quynh Vietnam. In 2011, Phương Linh participated in 11th Winds of Artist in Residence at Fukuoka Asian Art Museum with a solo exhibition Dust. In 2012 she presented project Home in the exhibition Hinterlands at the Luggage Store Gallery in San Francisco, United States. In 2013, she participated in the exhibition HIWAR, 25th anniversary of Darat Al Funnun in Amman, Jordan. In 2015, Phương Linh participated in the Mien Meo Mieng Exhibition, showcasing contemporary Art from Vietnam in Umea, Sweden. In 2016, she participated in the Singapore Biennale.

== Art organizing and curatorial practice ==
Since 2010, together with her fellow artist friend Bill Nguyen, Phương Linh founded and organized IN:ACT- the annual international performance festival in Vietnam, the annual international performance art festival in Hanoi.

In 2012, she founded and organized Skylines With Flying People, one of the most ambitious contemporary art events in Vietnam in the last decade with local and international artists and curators from Vietnam, Japan, Germany, US, Serbia, Shanghai, Korea... at Japan Foundation, Nha San Studio, Goethe Institute, Manzi Art Space and many public sites in Hanoi. The project took place at the Japan Foundation and was the first of its kind in Hanoi, representing alternative ways of art-making and exhibiting.
