= Norberto Roldan =

Filipino artist

Norberto Roldan (born 1953 in Roxas City, Philippines) is a visual artist and curator. He is widely known for founding the artist collective Black Artists of Asia, which in turn founded the Visayas Islands Visual Arts Exhibition and Conference (VIVA ExCon). In 2000, he and choreographer Donna Miranda founded Green Papaya Art Projects.

== Early life and education ==
Norberto Roldan's father and grandfather were architects. When he was eleven, his family sent him to study to become a priest. He has a Bachelor of Arts in Philosophy from St. Pius X Seminary, a Bachelor of Fine Arts in Visual Communications from University of Santo Tomas, Manila, and a Master of Arts in Art Studies from University of the Philippines, Diliman.

== Career ==
In his visual art practice, Roldan is known for using found objects to create assemblages. He has likened his use of assemblage to film production design, stating that "It builds the context for storytelling without giving the whole story." The themes of his works are often political or social in nature.

In 2012, curator June Yap invited Roldan to participate in No Country: Contemporary Art for South and Southeast Asia, one of three exhibitions from the Guggenheim UBS MAP Global Art Initiative. As part of the initiative, his painting, "F-16" was acquired for the Guggenheim Museum Collection. The painting, which Roldan has described as incorporating found digital objects, features the image of a US fighter jet over Afghanistan and quoted text from William McKinley advocating for the United States' colonial presence in the Philippines.

Roldan held his first US solo exhibition in New York in 2024.

Roldan's works are also held in the collections of the Singapore Art Museum, Fukuoka Asian Art Museum, and Deutsche Bank, among other institutions.

=== Black Artists of Asia ===
Roldan was politicized during the early 1980s when he went to Negros to work on a sugar farm that his then wife had inherited. As he has stated, it was his first time being exposed to the "feudal system and exploitation of sugar workers." The experience prompted him to get involved with the Concerned Artists of the Philippines (CAP), the organization that Lino Brocka founded in response to the Marcos dictatorship. In 1986, following the end of Marcos's rule, Roldan founded Black Artists of Asia (BAA) with other visual artists who had been active with CAP. Whereas artists had worked collectively within CAP to create murals, banners, and other forms of propaganda in support of their political activism, BAA presented an opportunity for these artists to develop their individual practices. The new organization was a "strategic formation for all the progressive artists to still be together, but no longer part of the larger movement of the National Democratic Movement."

== Influences ==
Roldan has cited the artists Joseph Cornell, John Baldessari, Roberto Chabet, and Santiago Bose as his influences.
