= Guggenheim UBS MAP Global Art Initiative =

Art program

The Guggenheim UBS MAP Global Art Initiative was a five-year program, supported by Swiss bank UBS in which the Solomon R. Guggenheim Foundation identified and works with artists, curators and educators from South and Southeast Asia, Latin America, and the Middle East and North Africa to expand its reach in the international art world. For each of the three phases of the project, the museum invited one curator from the chosen region to the Solomon R Guggenheim Museum in New York City for a two-year curatorial residency, where they worked with a team of Guggenheim staff to identify new artworks that reflect the range of talents in their parts of the world. The resident curators organized international touring exhibitions that highlight these artworks and help organize educational activities. The Foundation acquired these artworks for its permanent collection and included them as the focus of exhibitions that open at the museum in New York and subsequently traveled to two other cultural institutions or other venues around the world. The Foundation supplemented the exhibitions with a series of public and online programs, and supported cross-cultural exchange and collaboration between staff members of the institutions hosting the exhibitions. UBS reportedly contributied more than $40 million to the project to pay for its activities and the art acquisitions. Foundation director Richard Armstrong commented: "We are hoping to challenge our Western-centric view of art history."

== Phase 1: South and Southeast Asia ==
The first exhibition, No Country: Contemporary Art for South and Southeast Asia was curated by June Yap. Yap has worked for six years in the curatorial departments of modern and contemporary art museums, including the Institute of Contemporary Arts Singapore and the Singapore Art Museum. She gathered art from Indonesia, Malaysia, Thailand, Myanmar, Vietnam, Cambodia, the Philippines, Bangladesh and India for No Country. The exhibition was shown at the Solomon R. Guggenheim Museum in New York in 2013, the Asia Society Hong Kong Centre from October 2013 to February 2014, and Singapore's Centre for Contemporary Art from May to July 2014.

In this show, the artists featured are as follows:

- Bani Abidi
- Reza Afisina
- Khadim Ali
- Poklong Anading
- Aung Myint
- Simryn Gill
- Sheela Gowda
- Shilpa Gupta
- Ho Tzu Nyen
- Amar Kanwar
- Kamin Lertchaiprasert
- Vincent Leong
- Tayeba Begum Lipi
- Tuan Andrew Nguyen
- The Otolith Group
- Sopheap Pich
- The Propeller Group
- Araya Rasdjarmrearnsook
- Navin Rawanchaikul
- Norberto Roldan
- Arin Dwihartanto Sunaryo
- Tang Da Wu
- Tran Luong
- Truong Tan
- Vandy Rattana
- Wah Nu and Tun Win Aung
- Wong Hoy Cheong

== Phase 2: Latin America ==
The second exhibition of the project, Under the Same Sun: Art from Latin America Today, focused on art from Latin America and was curated by Pablo León de la Barra. On display are works by 40 artists representing 15 countries in Latin America, including Argentina, Bolivia, Brazil, Chile, Colombia, Costa Rica, Cuba, Guatemala, Honduras, Mexico, Panama, Peru, Uruguay and Venezuela. The artworks were organized around five themes: Conceptualism and its Legacies, Tropicologies, Political Activism, Modernism and its Failures, and Participation/Emancipation. The show ran at the Solomon R. Guggenheim Museum in New York from June 13 to October 1, 2014, at Museo Jumex in Mexico City from November 19, 2015, to February 7, 2016, and at the South London Gallery in Camberwell, London from June 10, 2016 to September 4, 2016.

In this show, the artists featured are as follows:

- Jennifer Allora and Guillermo Calzadilla
- Carlos Amorales
- Armando Andrade Tudela
- Alexander Apóstol
- Tania Bruguera
- Paulo Bruscky
- Luis Camnitzer
- Mariana Castillo Deball
- Alejandro Cesarco
- Raimond Chaves and Gilda Mantilla
- Donna Conlon and Jonathan Harker
- Adriano Costa
- Minerva Cuevas
- Jonathas de Andrade
- Wilson Díaz
- Juan Downey
- Rafael Ferrer
- Regina José Galindo
- Mario García Torres
- Dominique González-Foerster
- Tamar Guimarães
- Federico Herrero
- Alfredo Jaar
- Claudia Joskowicz
- Runo Lagomarsino
- David Lamelas
- Marta Minujín
- Carlos Motta
- Iván Navarro
- Rivane Neuenschwander
- Gabriel Orozco
- Damián Ortega
- Amalia Pica
- Wilfredo Prieto
- Paul Ramírez Jonas
- Beatriz Santiago Muñoz
- Gabriel Sierra
- Javier Téllez
- Erika Verzutti
- Carla Zaccagnini

In conjunction with Under the Same Sun, Alfredo Jaar's A Logo for America (1987), an animation for an electronic billboard in Times Square, was shown again in Times Square in August 2014 as part of Times Square Alliance's "Midnight Moments" series.

Artist Federico Herrero, whose work is displayed in Under the Same Sun, completed a residency at the South London Gallery from May to June 2016, during which he engaged with the local residents of Pelican Estate, Peckham and created a site-specific work in the children's playground.

== Phase 3: Middle East and Northern Africa ==
The third and final exhibition was titled But a Storm is Blowing from Paradise: Contemporary Art of the Middle East and North Africa, curated by Sara Raza. The show opened on April 29, 2016, at the Solomon R. Guggenheim Museum in New York City and will be on view until October 5, 2016. The exhibition traveled to Istanbul's Pera Museum in 2017.

In this show, the artists featured are as follows:

- Kader Attia
- Abbas Akhavan
- Ergin Çavuşoğlu
- Lida Abdul
- Mariam Ghani
- Rokni Haerizadeh
- Susan Hefuna
- Iman Issa
- Nadia Kaabi-Linke
- Mohammed Kazem
- Ahmed Mater
- Ala Younis
- Zineb Sedira
- Ori Gersht
- Ali Cherri
- Joana Hadjithomas and Khalil Joreige
- Emily Jacir
- Gülsün Karamustafa
- Hassan Khan
- Nadia Kaabi-Linke

Hello Guggenheim: Film and Video Curated by Bidoun Projects was a four-week program of film and videos shown at the Solomon R. Guggenheim Museum in May 2016 about the politics and power of the moving image, organized by Bidoun Projects.
