= Poklong Anading =

Filipino artist

Poklong Anading (born August 1, 1975, Manila, Philippines) is a contemporary artist. He works in various mediums including photography, video, painting, sculpture and installation. He is the recipient of the 2006 Ateneo Studio Residency Grant in Australia, the 2006 Cultural Center of the Philippines 13 Artists Award, and 2006 and 2008 Ateneo Art Awards. His previous residencies include Big Sky Mind, Manila (2003–04), and Common Room, Bandung, Indonesia.

== Early life ==
Poklong Anading was born on August 1, 1975, in Manila, Philippines. He was a student of Roberto Chabet and graduated from the College of Fine Arts, University of Philippines in 1999 with a BFA in painting. He has been recognized for his work on both a national and international level.

== Themes ==
Although he received his formal training in painting, Anading works mainly in photography and video. His work has also extended into process-oriented sculpture and installation in the style of Arte Povera. Through his art, Poklong Anading assumes the role of observer and collector, creating images and objects derived from facts and memories. He also explores and documents the intangible such as light, time, gravity and space.

Anading has also expressed an interest in identity. For his Anonymity series (2004-), the artist takes photographs of individuals whose faces are unidentifiable behind blinding sunlight. His Hit or Miss is a Hit(2015) show exhibited at the 1335 Mabini art gallery in Manila, also included images of anonymous people taking selfies of themselves. The artist has classified identity as a “never-ending” topic that intensifies the more it is discussed. His various attempts at concealing the face—considered the main identifier of an individual—are the result of a desire to create a “clean slate” by removing the limitations of identity.

Poklong Anading's art also focuses on including the subject or the viewer in the artwork. While his Miracle Healing and Other Hopeful Things (2011) show exhibited at Mo Space, Manila focused on bringing the observer back to a childlike state through the use of colorful materials and confetti, his other works such as the Homage to Homage sculptures (2014-2015) dwell on “the ratio of Manila's aggressive urbanization and accretion of skyscrapers on the one hand and the abounding living and working conditions on the other.”

The artist has said that he derives his ideas from his current setting—his "present circumstances" or a "given moment" dictate the medium in which he will work. His work is often preceded by a great deal of research.

== Selected exhibitions ==
=== Anonymity (2004–) ===
Anonymity is an ongoing photography project, which began in 2004. Taken on streets where Anading has traveled, the photographs in the series show individuals holding circular mirrors in front of their faces that reflect sunlight back to the camera. The series creates an absence of knowledge and an enhanced sense of anonymity through the faces concealed by the bright sunlight. The artist aims to mark the “clothes, bearings and backgrounds” of these individuals as their only possible identifier, and places attention on the “background that configures the encountered ‘Other.’” Anading also expresses interest in the point where identity and representation vanish and “selfhood” is both marked and erased. Anonymity also received the 007 Silverlens Foundation Acquisition Grant. The first piece in the series, Counter Acts I, was exhibited at the Solomon R. Guggenheim Museum in the exhibition No Country: Contemporary Art for South and Southeast Asia. With the Guggenheim UBS MAP Global Art Initiative, the artwork later traveled to the Asia Society Hong Kong Centre and the Center for Contemporary Art in Singapore.

=== Urban Canyon (2015) ===
This exhibition was held in the 1335 Mabini art gallery in Manila, and was structured to draw the audience's attention to the unique structures hidden in the city. The artist's idea behind this project is that our conception of a city relies heavily on cosmopolitan ideals, which inevitably eliminate its true character. For this show, Anading exhibited four series of projects: Road to Mountains, Untitled (Drawer), Homage to Homage, and Gateway. In the show, the artist used “forgotten” objects from the city that were annihilated in order to make way for the new urban setting, and placed them outside of their usual environment. Understanding the exhibition requires questioning what is lost within the structure and what it is replaced with.

In Untitled (Drawer), the artist accumulated images of tower cranes in clear film photographs, as the tower crane disappeared when the skyscraper reached its final stage. As the new object was completed the tower cranes vanished in oblivion.

A similar topic was portrayed in Homage to Homage, in which a scaffold was wrapped in steel by the artist in order to celebrate its temporary nature. The idea behind the show was to demonstrate the vanishing nature of all objects that are created for the sole purpose of aiding architecture that will construct the ideal metropolitan city. The scaffold's form was preserved but wrapped in luster by the artist in order to depict the very question behind its presence, and ultimately its disappearance.

In Road to Mountains, Anading placed rubber tires used as speed bumps throughout the gallery to highlight their contradictory nature; an object used for motion that becomes a means to cease motion. The artist depicted the paradox behind speed bumps alongside the paradox with the progression of city life.

The final show in the project; Gateway, was a three-part video set in three different cities: Singapore, Manila and La Rochelle. The artist used this video to explore the “borders that define a city” through the use of contradicting images such as structure and sky, and silhouette and light. Anading drew attention through the video to how the urban edifices change cityscapes.

=== Pocket Coffin (2013) ===
This exhibition was held at the Galerie Zimmermann Kratochwill (Graz, Austria) from October 31, 2012, to January 5, 2013. Anading came up with the title of the exhibition during an inter-religious event in the same city, and derived the name from a 7th-century pocketbook. For this exhibition, Anading once again focused on the ordinary, and introduced four works about “home, exploring and finding, operating systems and the puzzlement of information and filtering, desire and fulfillment.” This exhibition, like his previous ones, encouraged active participation from the audience. One of the shows in the exhibition was called “rfinderexplore”, which consisted of sound files made up of the various voices heard during the religious conference. The artist presented all of these sound files as blank folders, eliminating the certainty that the digital usually brings and instead forcing the viewer to delve into uncertainty.

=== Miracle Healing and Other Hopeful Things (2011) ===
Miracle Healing and Other Hopeful Things (2011, Mo Space, Manila) was the artist's exhibition of large scale installations. For this project the artist collected used materials around the city and re-used them as art objects that have regained In addition to a new way of producing art, with this exhibition Anading also created a new way of touring an exhibition. His installations included both fabric and iron, portraying the balance between two opposites.

=== Drunken Revelry (2009) ===
For this exhibition Anading divided the exhibition space into two: One half for his video, and the other half for his sound project. Both installations were based on his experience with a wooden toy boat from Bandung called Perahu. The first half of the exhibition was set in a dark room with recorded sounds of the Perahu in water, while the second half projected on unused gallery equipment the colorful images of Perahus in water.
