= Ringo Bunoan =

Filipino artist

- Born: August 3, 1974 (age 51); Philippines
- Education: BFA in Art History, University of the Philippines, Dilliman
- Known for: Artist, Curator

Ringo S. Bunoan is a Filipino artist, curator, research and writer based in Manila, Philippines. She is known for her conceptual approach, working across media in installation, sound, video, bookworks and writing. She earned her bachelor's degree in Art History from the University of the Philippines, Dillman. Her works have been shown in galleries, museums and alternative art spaces in Manila, across Asia and the Pacific and USA, including Center for Contemporary Photography, Melbourne, 4th Gwangju Biennale, Singapore Art Museum, Busan Biennale Sea Art Festival, Asian Art Museum, Walter McBean Galleries in San Francisco and REDCAT Gallery in Los Angeles, and Campbelltown Arts Centre, Sydney.

== Artist-Run Spaces ==
In 1999, Bunoan co-founded Big Sky Mind, an independent art space located first in New Manila and later in Cubao, Quezon City, a gallery and café that she ran with collaborator Katya Guerrero from 1999 to 2001 before it became a space for artists’ projects until 2004. Big Sky Mind was part of the second generation of artist-run spaces founded in Manila. The goal of the centre was to create awareness about contemporary Filipino art on both a local and global scale, and to provide young artists with working studios and other support facilities that enabled them to produce and develop their work. Bunoan and Guerrero later went on to co-found Artbooks.ph, an independent bookstore that focuses on Philippine art.

Bunoan writes that the work of the artist-run spaces was crucial for young artists especially in the 1990s, as most of the local galleries exhibited traditional paintings and sculptures by established artists.

== Solo exhibitions ==
Her solo exhibitions include Bookworks at Mo_space in 2016; How Can I Come Back When I Never Left? at Manila Contemporary in 2013; In Advance of the Things We Cannot See at Mo_space in 2012; Pillow Talk at Silverlens Gallery in 2008; and Little Deaths at Mo_space in 2008.

== Archival and Curatorial Work ==
From 2007 to 2013, Bunoan was active as a researcher for the Philippines for the Hong Kong-based nonprofit organization Asia Art Archive, where she worked on Filipino artist-run spaces and the work of Roberto Chabet. The digitalized materials of this archive is publicly accessible from Asia Art Archive's website.

In 2009, Bunoan organized Archiving Roberto Chabet, an exhibition hosted at the UP Vargas Museum. This exhibition highlighted Chabet's early drawings and collages from the 1960s and his recent artworks.

The physical archive of Roberto Chabet was absorbed into King Kong Art Projects Unlimited in Manila, which was established by Chabet's former students, including Bunoan, Nilo Ilarde, Mawen Ong, Soler Santos, and MM Yu. This group of artists organized Chabet: Fifty Years, a series of exhibitions, talks, and publications in Singapore, Hong Kong, and Manila, which focused on Chabet's artworks as well as materials from his archive.

In 2016 Bunoan curated the Marker program of the Art Dubai Contemporary Art Fair, focusing on artist-run culture in the Philippines. In 2018, Bunoan was chief curator of the inaugural Manila Biennale, which took place in Intramuros, and ran from February 3 to March 5, 2018. She curated OPENCITY, a site-specific exhibition, and worked with co-curators Con Cabrera, Alice Sarmiento, Cocoy Lumbao, Matthew Lopez, and Monchito Nocon.

== Awards ==
She was the recipient of Cultural Center of the Philippines' 2003 Thirteen Artists Award and Silverlens' Foundation 2007 Completion Grant, and was shortlisted for the 2009 Ateneo Art Awards.
