= Sandar Khaing =

Burmese painter (born 1971)

- စန္ဒာခိုင်
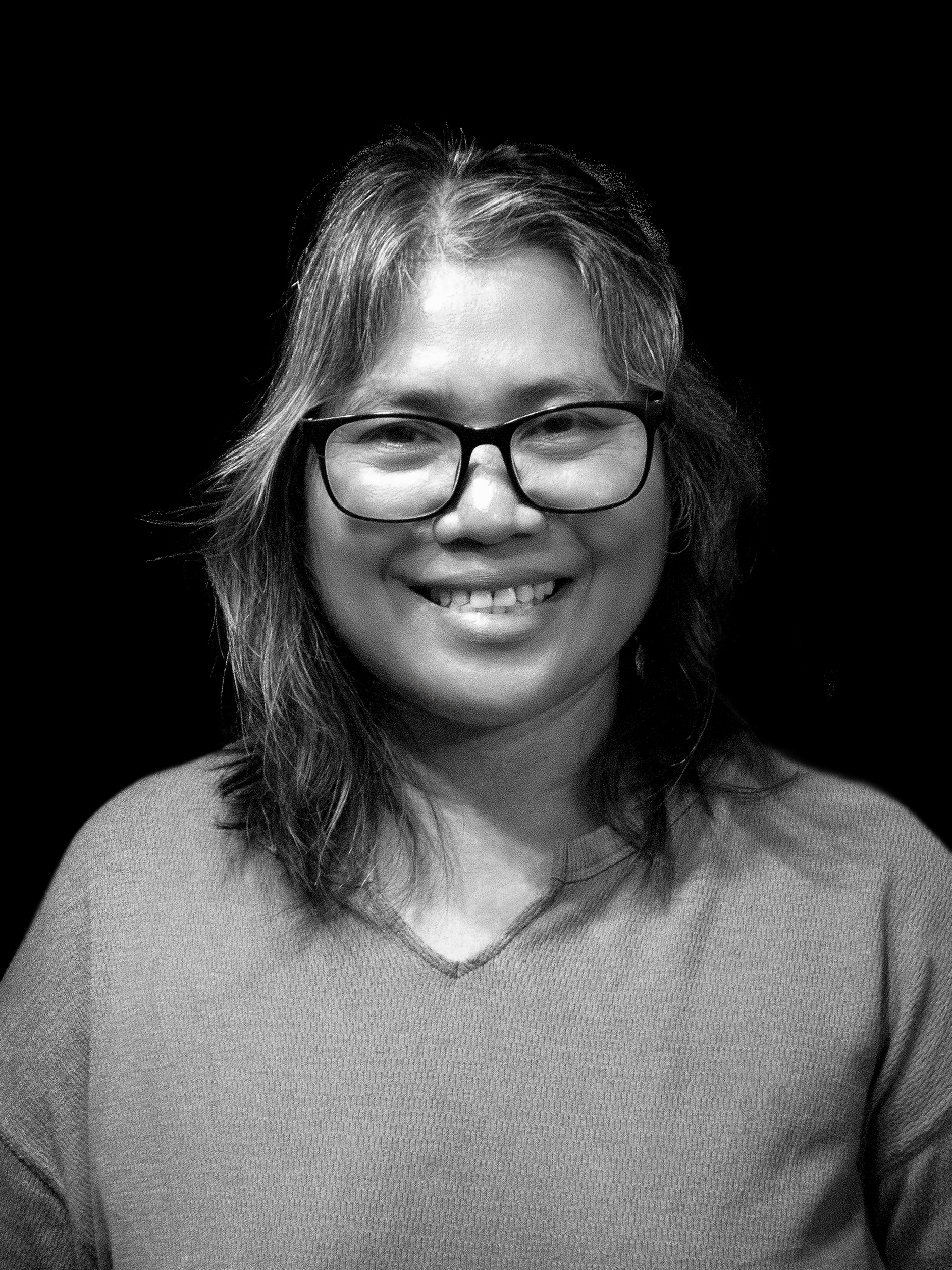
- Portrait of Sandar Khaing in 2025
- Born: 1971 (age 54–55); Yangon, Myanmar
- Education: Studied under U Pe Nyunt Way, U Win Pe Myint, and U Mg Mg Thein
- Known for: Painting
- Movement: Contemporary Burmese Art
- Awards: Nominated for the Sovereign Art Prize (2017); nominated for the Prudential Eye Award (2014)

Sandar Khaing (Burmese: စန္ဒာခိုင်, pronounced [/sàɴdà kʰàɪɴ/], also spelt Sandar Khine) is a Burmese contemporary artist, noted for her bold depictions of female nudes.

== Biography ==
Sandar Khaing was born in 1971 in Yangon, Myanmar, and studied painting under the guidance of U Pe Nyunt Way, U Win Pe Myint, and U Mg Mg Thein (Pathein). Her early work emerged in a climate of strict censorship, where nude figure painting was culturally and politically sensitive. She initially practiced such studies in private, including clandestine live drawing sessions.

== Artistic work and exhibitions ==
Sandar Khaing is best known for a series of brightly colored, curvaceous female nudes, portrayed with expressive lines and often rendered in acrylic and charcoal.

Her 2009 exhibition The Naked Truth in Chiang Mai, Thailand, was among her earliest solo presentations. A similarly titled version premiered at Cloud 31 Gallery in Yangon in 2015, consisting of 34 paintings featuring women reading Myanmar state newspapers—an evocative intersection of the personal and political.

She has held several solo exhibitions in Yangon, including:

- Sandar Khaing Solo Show (2006, Studio Square)
- Contentment Cows (2011, Lokanat Galleries)
- The Naked Truth–II (2014, Studio Square)
- The Naked Truth–III (2015, Cloud 31 Gallery)
- The Readers (2018, Nawaday Tharlar Gallery)
- The Naked Truth–IV (2023, IVY Gallery)

Her group exhibitions include:

- Blue Wind (2010, National Museum, Yangon)
- Ongoing Echo 1 & 2 (2010–11, Indonesia–Myanmar exchanges)
- Myanmar 2010: Contemporary Art Exhibition (2010, Chiang Mai)
- ASEAN museums’ collection (2014, Busan Art Museum, South Korea)
- Banned in Burma (2014, Hong Kong Visual Arts Centre)
- My Yangon, My Home (2015, River Ayarwaddy Gallery)
- Burma by Proxy (2015, Hong Kong Visual Arts Centre)
- Connecting Bridges (2018, EU Ambassador’s Residence, Yangon)
- Seven Decades (2018, The Secretariat, Yangon)
- Against the Tide: Myanmar Art in the Moment (2024, London)

In 2014, Sandar Khaing undertook an artist residency along with Zun Ei Phyu at Rimbun Dahan in Kuala Lumpur, Malaysia.

== Recognition and impact ==
She was nominated for the Prudential Eye Award in 2014 and the Sovereign Art Prize in 2017.

Sandar Khaing’s work stands out in the Burmese contemporary scene for its frank portrayal of the nude form—traditionally taboo in Myanmar—and its use of physical curvature to express strength and humanity.
