= The Oneness Gallery =

Art gallery based in United Kingdom

The Oneness Gallery, launched in 2023, is a UK-based online contemporary and modern art gallery. It operates as an autonomous platform that utilizes various artistic mediums to advocate the concept of oneness.

The Oneness Gallery organizes 2 to 3 physical exhibitions annually in various cities. The exhibitions provide exposure to diverse audiences and enhance the credibility of its online platform to foster deeper engagement with communities worldwide. Currently, the gallery represents two artists, Avidyā and Marigpa.

== History ==
=== 2024 ===
In 2024, The Oneness Gallery organized a series of international exhibitions for the artist Avidya, including a debut solo exhibition titled “Avidyā? Vidyā?” for Avidyā at the RWS Gallery in London. The collection was described as a thematic bridge between the depths of suffering and the heights of love.

Following its debut in London, the exhibition subsequently moved to the Hong Kong Visual Arts Centre on October 9-14, representing Avidyā's first presenting in Asia.

During this period, The Oneness Gallery reinforced its commitment to artistic integrity by publicly cancelling a planned exhibition in Toronto and severing ties with its Canadian agent. The decision was met with positive feedback from the public, supporting the gallery's dedication to maintaining high standards of authenticity and artist presentations.

=== 2025 ===
In 2025, the gallery began representing London-based artist Marigpa. In April 2025, Marigpa's debut solo exhibition "Golden Journey" was held at the Hong Kong Arts Centre (Pao Galleries), featuring works created with metallic pigments and mineral-based media.

In August 2025, The Oneness Gallery announced the postponement and venue change of the "Golden Journey - Dear Me, I Love You" exhibition in Hong Kong. Citing a zero-tolerance policy against venue partner using CSR for commercial gain, and confirmed that full refunds of entry fees to participating artists.

Later that year, in October 2025, the gallery collaborated with the British Consulate-General Hong Kong to host two major installations by Marigpa and an accompanying forum :【Embrace Your Unscripted Life : A forum on authentic connection 擁抱真實自我：探索不設限的人生論壇 】.

=== 2026 ===
In February and March 2026, The Oneness Gallery presented Marigpa solo exhibition "AETHER - Golden Journey" at the Dundas Street Gallery in Edinburgh. This body of work reflected a shift toward themes of "pure liberation" and "Aether", following the artist's retreat into silence

In October and November 2026, the gallery presented Marigpa's solo exhibition titled "Golden Journey – AETHER – Heal the World" at the CP Center in Beijing. Marking the artist's mainland China debut, the exhibition featured works centered on themes of universal connection, inner healing, and spiritual renewal.
