= Ray Albano =

Filipino painter, poet, and curator

- Raymundo Albano
- Born: Raymundo Albano; 27 January 1947; Bacarra, Ilocos Norte, Philippines
- Died: 6 August 1985 (aged 38); Manila, Philippines
- Education: Ateneo de Manila University
- Occupations: Curator; painter; poet

Raymundo "Ray" Albano (27 January 1947 – 6 August 1985) was a Filipino curator, art critic, writer, poet, painter, and scholar who served as museum director of the Cultural Center of the Philippines from 1970 until his death in 1985.

== Biography ==
Raymundo Albano was born in Bacarra, Ilocos Norte on 27 January 1947. He studied at the Ateneo de Manila, earning a bachelor's degree in 1968 with the distinction of receiving the John Mulry Award for Literary Excellence. Shortly after, he held his first one-man exhibition at Joy T. Dayrit's Print Gallery. He exhibited thereafter with the Luz Gallery, the ABC Galleries, and Sining Kamalig. He was named among the recipients of the first Thirteen Artists Award by the Cultural Center of the Philippines in 1970. In 1974, he won an Honorable Mention in the Tokyo Biennale of International Prints. In 1977, Albano received a grant as Artist-in-Residence under the Fulbright-Hayes Fund International Exchange of Scholars at the University of the Pacific in Stockton, California.

== Paintings ==
Raymundo Albano's works are often credited as precursors of conceptual art in the Philippines along with the work of his contemporary Roberto Chabet. His paintings are mostly abstractions that incorporate found objects. Several pieces are in the collection of the Metropolitan Museum of Manila, the Cultural Center of the Philippines, Singapore Art Museum, and the National Museum of Fine Arts of the Philippines, aside from prestigious private collections.

== Curator ==
Albano was the curator of several exhibitions showcasing the art from the Philippines such as the Philippine Collection for the Asian Art Festival held at the Fukuoka Art Museum, Japan, and the Philippine Sceneries Show in Beijing, China. Albano succeeded Roberto Chabet as Museum Director of the Cultural Center of the Philippines (CCP) in 1970. He introduced the exhibition of multimedia works during his tenure at the CCP and also personally designed several exhibition posters. He is a founding partner of Finale Art File, one of the oldest contemporary art galleries in Manila.

== Poetry ==
Ray Albano started writing poetry in the 1950s as a high school student in San Sebastian College, where he wrote for the school paper. In Ateneo he contributed poems to Heights, the university's literary journal. According to curator and scholar Patrick D. Flores, Albano is considered to be in the league of Filipino modernists, Aurelio Alvero, Hernando R. Ocampo, and David Medalla. The poet Emmanuel S. Torres wrote about Raymundo R. Albano's poetic style as "at once abstractive and pictorial—not as posture but as fluent assertion of a fully achieved sensibility."

== Recognition ==
Ray Albano is currently the subject of a number of exhibitions that examine his influential role as a pioneering artist-curator in the Philippines. He has been featured in a retrospective exhibition at the Vargas Museum in 2017 and at a special exhibition at the Art Fair Philippines in 2019.

== Illness and death ==
Ray Albano suffered from frequent asthma attacks and scoliosis for most of his life and had to walk with a limp. His unusual posture earned him the monicker "The Quasimodo of the Cultural Center" which he self-mockingly referred to himself. He died in 1985 at the age of 38.

== Bibliography ==
Raymundo Albano's curatorial work, artworks, and literary pieces are used and discussed in the followings scholarly texts:

- The Life and Art of Lee Aguinaldo. Philippines: Vibal Foundation, 2011.
- Flores, Patrick D.. The Philippine Contemporary: Sa Pagitan Ng Mga Landas to Scale the Past and the Possible. Philippines: Metropolitan Museum of Manila, 2018.
- Zhuang, Wubin. Photography in Southeast Asia: A Survey. Singapore: NUS Press, 2016.
- Every Step in the Right Direction. Singapore: Singapore Art Museum, 2019.
- Other Globes: Past and Peripheral Imaginations of Globalization. Germany: Springer International Publishing, 2019.
- Time in the History of Art: Temporality, Chronology and Anachrony. United States: Taylor & Francis, 2018.
- A Companion to Curation. United Kingdom: Wiley, 2019.
- Suddenly Turning Visible: Art and Architecture in Southeast Asia (1969–1989). Singapore: National Gallery Singapore, 2019.

== See also ==
- Roberto Chabet
- Patrick D. Flores
- David Medalla
- Hernando R. Ocampo
