= Tayeba Begum Lipi =

- Born: 1969 (age 56–57); Gaibandha District, Bangladesh
- Education: University of Dhaka
- Occupation: Artist

Tayeba Begum Lipi (born 1969) is a Bangladeshi artist and the co-founder and trustee of Britto Arts Trust. She received a Grand Prize at the 11th Asian Art Biennale, Bangladesh 2004. Lipi is a multimedia artist who has engaged in paintings, prints, installations and videos. Her works have been featured in notable group exhibitions, including the 54th Venice Biennale (2011) and Colombo Art Biennale (2012). She was also the commissioner for the Bangladesh Pavilion at the 54th Venice Biennale (2011).

== Early life and education ==
Lipi was born in Gaibandha. The relationship with her choice of materials dates back to her childhood. As Lipi is the eleventh of twelve children, she was often present when her nieces and nephews were brought into the world. Later on, the stainless steel razor blade used by the midwives becomes a significant role in her works. She has used this medium to regenerate everyday objects, including bathtubs, baby perambulators, and handbags. In 1993, she obtained her Master of Fine Arts in Drawing and Painting from the University of Dhaka.

== Career ==
Lipi has exhibited at Alliance Française (1998 and 2004) and Bengal Gallery of Fine Arts in Dhaka (2007). In 2002, Lipi co-founded Britto Arts Trust with her partner, artist Mahbubur Rahman. It is the first artist-run nonprofit organization in Bangladesh, focusing on experimental and dynamic art through exhibitions, enabling international dialogue and exchange, and providing support to the country's artists through residencies, workshops, and funding.

Lipi's practice engages painting, printmaking, installation, and video to comment on themes including the politics of gender and female identity. Her works were largely influenced by 11 September attacks in New York in 2001. She encountered racial discrimination in the trip to Europe with her husband, in which they were treated as Bangladeshi Muslims. "People felt that they had to stick to only one identity", Lipi said.

== Works ==
Lipi's practice engages painting, printmaking, installation, and video to represent themes, such as the politics of gender and female identity.

=== Feminism ===
In 2004, Lipi's work My Childhood won the Grand Prize at the Asian Art Biennale. It is the portrait of a Bangladeshi woman's bronzed face, which is veiled behind a series of neatly ordered dolls. This painting was included at her solo exhibition Feminine at Bengal Gallery of Fine Arts in Dhaka. 15–28 June 2007. Some of her works have used the past experiences as the subject. For example, the little dolls in her award-winning artwork were from her childhood. The face of the woman is covered with glass since Lipi believes when one grows up, the past will be preserved in memory just like in a showcase.

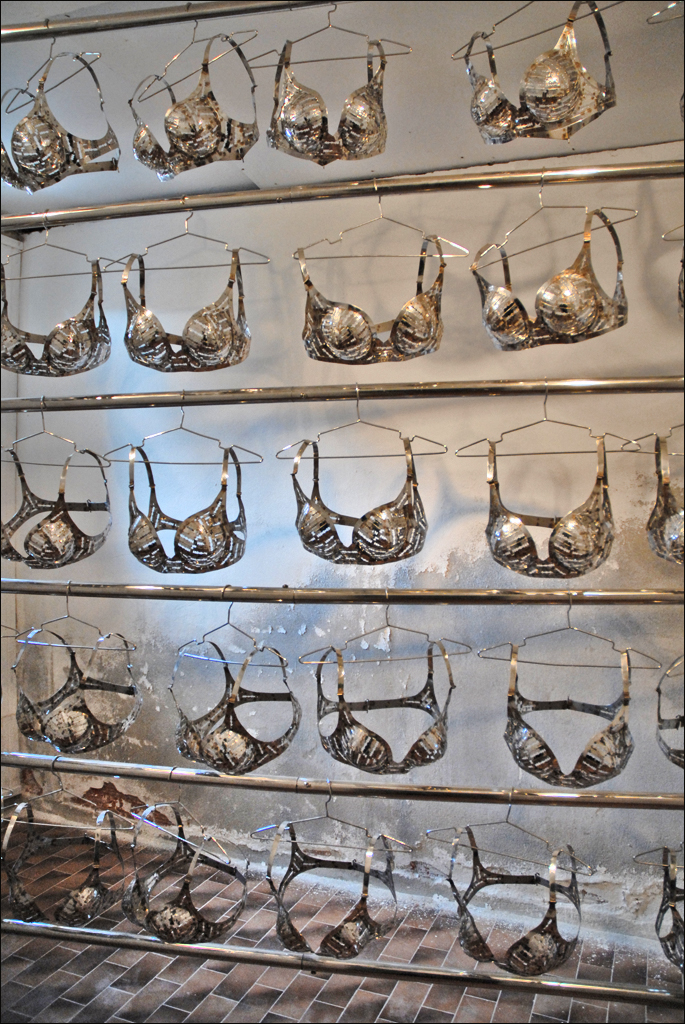
Bizarre and the Beautiful 2011 Stainless steel made rack, hangers and razor blades 270x254x77 cm

Bizarre and Beautiful (2011), an installation of female undergarments crafted from stainless steel razor blades. Love Bed (2012) is one of her work in the exhibition "No Country: Contemporary Art for South and Southeast Asia" at Guggenheim Museum in New York, (22 February – 22 May 2013) highlighting the issue of female identity and the history of violence. Lipi used the medium of razor blades to represent violence implied by their sharp edges, even though this is not Lipi's original focus. 'She intended it to represent the women in the community where she grew up. In spite of hardship, the women were resilient, they had optimism, and they managed to successfully bring up families', said June Yap, curator of the exhibition 'No Country: Contemporary Art for South and Southeast Asia'.

=== Trans rights ===
Reversal Reality (2015)

Lipi showcased her exhibition "Reversal Reality" in the India Art Fair, with Anonnya who served as its inspiration. She met Anonnya while making her video piece HOME for a show "Cross Casting" at Britto Arts Trust. Lipi stated that transgender people "are considered strangers and aliens, people to be afraid of". In view of this, she decided to make people aware of their basic rights to live with dignity. She compared her life with Anonnya through videos, installations and photographs. In one of her works, Destination (2 cascades), Lipi used razor blades as the material to bring up the issue of suicides among the transgender community.
