= Green Papaya Art Projects =

Philippines independent artist-run space

Green Papaya Art Projects (GPAP) is an independent artist-run space in Metro Manila, Philippines. Founded by artists Norberto Roldan and Donna Miranda in 2000, it aims to provide a platform that organizes and supports intellectual communication, creative dialogues, and collaboration in the contemporary art community, especially for young emerging artists in Asia. The name "Green Papaya" is a metaphor for freshness, which suggests that the art space is always in a state of becoming.

Originally established at a condominium building near the University of the Philippines in Quezon City, with its next move to a converted garage, then a two-level apartment, Green Papaya Art Projects builds an interdependent community with its various partners. Mediating between galleries, universities, and individual artists, Green Papaya Art Projects hosts exhibitions, residency projects, and artist talks in an effort to generate new conversations, while combining elements of dance, performance art, music, and film into the picture. It also published its first-and-only issue of Papaya magazine in 2008 on Philippines contemporary art.

In 2010, Green Papaya Art Projects brought its programs to the No Soul For Sale Festival of the Independents at Tate Modern in London, and the New World: Night Festival at the National Museum of Singapore. In 2018, it co-curated the biennial Visayas Islands Visual Arts Exhibition and Conference (VIVA ExCon), with the theme "Don't Even Bring Water" at Capiz.

On June 3, 2020, a fire at a neighboring store destroyed the physical location of Green Papaya Art Projects. Along with artwork, historical documentation of the initiative and associated artists were destroyed. Since 2017, however, Green Papaya had been doing significant archival work alongside Asia Art Archive.

While Green Papaya had plans to officially close in 2021, the fire encouraged the organizers to continue the work. In 2022, it participated in the Istanbul Biennial, in collaboration with NPAA (United Progressive Artists and Architects) and PiST// Interdisciplinary Project Space Istanbul).
