= Nadia Kaabi-Linke =

Tunisian artist (born 1978)

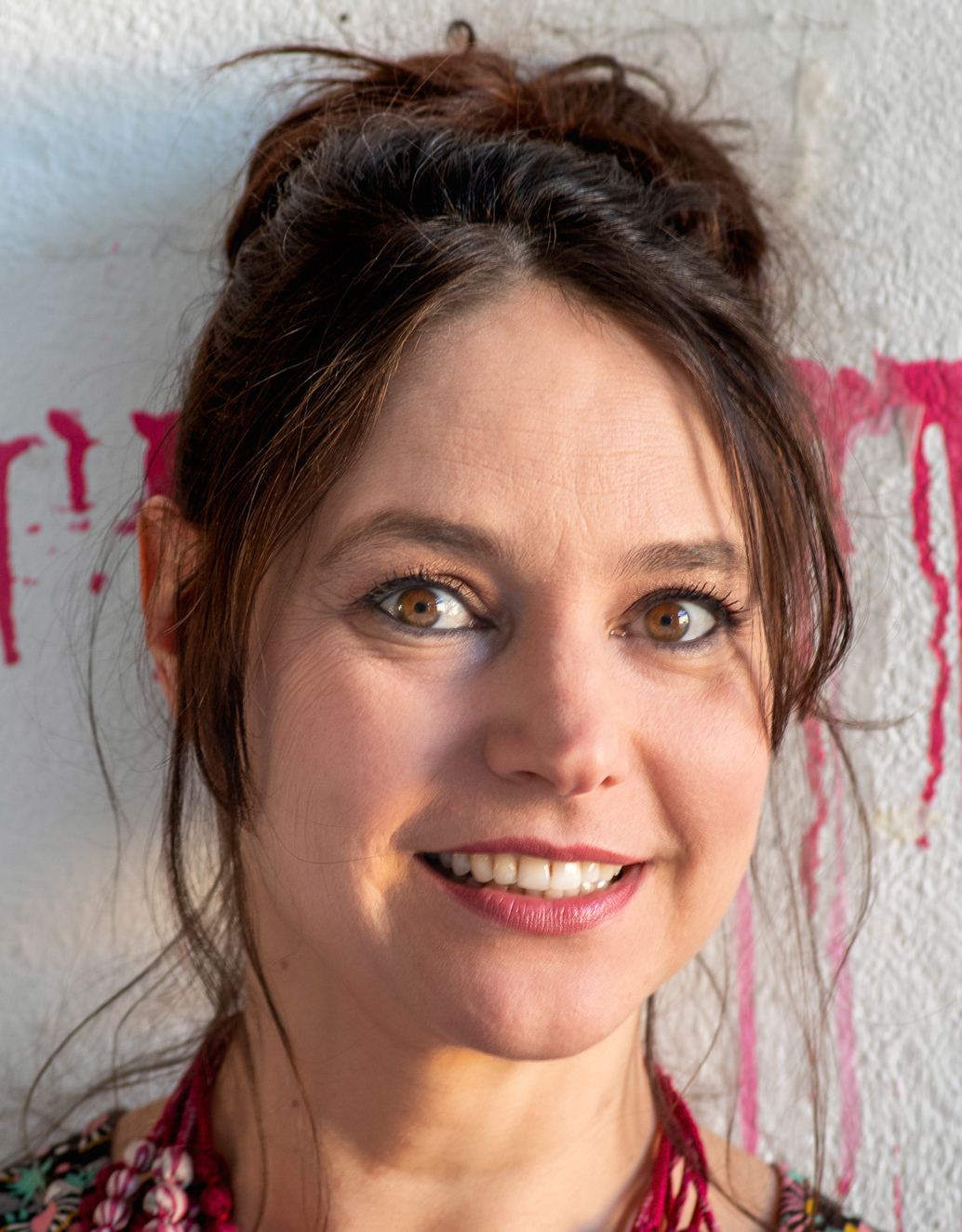
- Kaabi-Linke in 2020
- Born: 1978 (age 47–48); Tunis, Tunisia
- Education: Tunis Institute of Fine Arts, Sorbonne
- Known for: Installation art
- Notable work: Flying Carpets (2011)
- Awards: Discoveries Prize; 2014 Art Basel Hong Kong; Abraaj Group Art Prize; 2011

Nadia Kaabi-Linke (born 1978) is a Tunis-born, Berlin-based visual artist best known for her conceptual art and 2011 sculpture Flying Carpets. Her work has explored themes of geopolitics, immigration, and transnational identities. Raised between Tunis, Kyiv, Dubai and Paris, she studied at the Tunis Institute of Fine Arts and received a Ph.D. in philosophy of art from the Sorbonne. Kaabi-Linke won the 2011 Abraaj Group Art Prize, which commissioned Flying Carpets, a hanging cage-like sculpture that casts geometric shadows onto the floor akin to the carpets of Venetian street vendors. The piece was acquired by the New York Guggenheim in 2016 as part of their Guggenheim UBS MAP Global Art Initiative. Kaabi-Linke also won the Discoveries Prize for emerging art at the 2014 Art Basel Hong Kong. Her works have been collected by the Museum of Modern Art, Dallas Museum of Art, Burger Collection, and Samdani Art Foundation, and exhibited in multiple solo and group shows.

== Early life and career ==
Nadia Kaabi-Linke was born in Tunis in 1978. She is of Ukrainian and Tunisian heritage, her father a sports academic and her mother a chemist. Kaabi-Linke was raised between Kyiv and Tunis. She moved to Dubai when she was 12 when her father took a job there. Kaabi-Linke recalled the move as difficult, particularly in losing the opportunity to study modern dance. With her mother's encouragement, Kaabi-Linke began to draw. Later she studied painting at the Tunis Institute of Fine Arts, graduated in 1999, and received her Ph.D. from the Sorbonne in 2008 in aesthetics and the philosophy of art. While in France, she met her German husband, Timo, who would later curate many of Kaabi-Linke's shows.

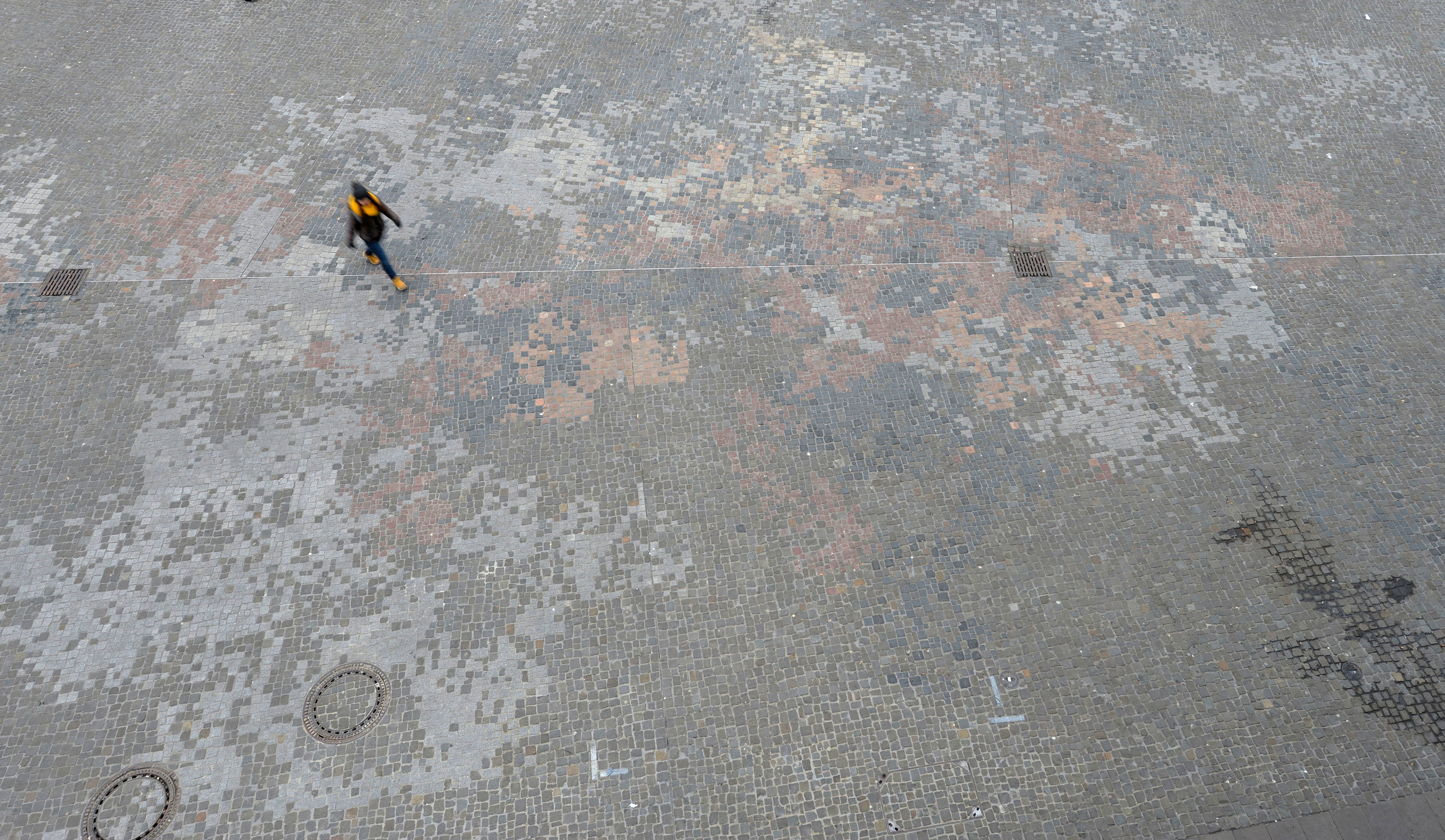
Meinstein, 2014

The artist held her first solo show in Tunis in 2009, and subsequent solo shows in Berlin (2010), the Mosaic Rooms of Earl's Court (London, 2014), and the Dallas Contemporary (2015). Kaabi-Linke received the 2009 Alexandria Biennale's Jury Prize and the 2011 Abraaj Group Art Prize. The latter commissioned her 2011 Flying Carpets, which was shown at the 54th Venice Biennale and later purchased by and exhibited at the New York Guggenheim Museum in 2016. Kaabi-Linke held a residency at the London Delfina Foundation in 2012, where she was inspired after meeting survivors of domestic violence. She won the Discoveries Prize for emerging art at the 2014 Art Basel Hong Kong, where she exhibited with the Kolkatan Experimenter gallery. One of the judges juxtaposed the social content of her work against the political reservations of other exhibitions in the show. Earlier that year, she completed her Meinstein ("My Stone") project in the center of Neukölln, a borough of Berlin. Her pavement mosaic uses stones that correspond to the national origins of the borough's residents, which is a largely immigrant population. She described her practice, at that time, as an archaeology of contemporary life. As of 2016, Kaabi-Linke is represented by Lawrie Shabibi of Dubai and Experimenter of Kolkata.

== Work ==
In Kaabi-Linke's 2009 installation, Under Standing Over Views, paint chips from city walls in Tunis, Kyiv, Paris, Berlin, Cologne and other Tunisian cities are positioned horizontally and suspended from the ceiling in a cluster. Caitlin Woolsey of Jadaliyya wrote that the work recalled city development-induced displacement policies and symbolized the mass that formed the United Arab Emirates, the country where the piece was installed (Sharjah Art Museum). Kaabi-Linke said that her work is "unintentionally autobiographical".

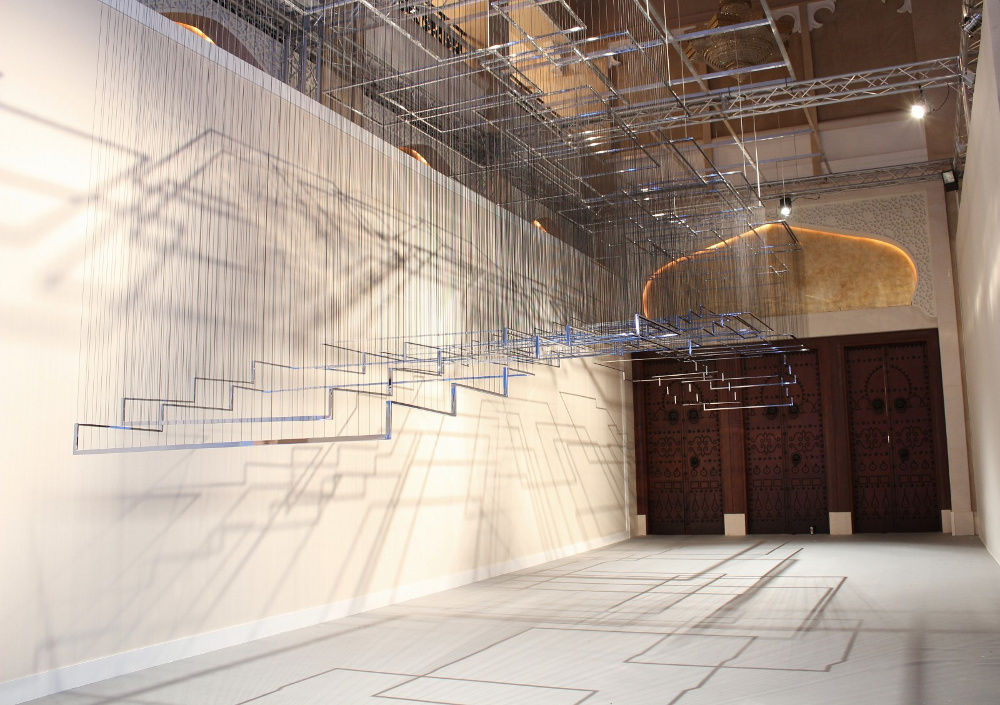
Flying Carpets, 2011

External audio
- Guggenheim audio commentary on Flying Carpets

The 2011 Abraaj Group Art Prize commissioned Kaabi-Linke's Flying Carpets the same year. In the installation, a cage-like structure hangs from the ceiling and casts quadrilateral shadows onto the ground. Kaabi-Linke drew inspiration from a bridge in Venice where Arab and African street vendors used carpets to show counterfeit wares. The work was shown at the 54th Venice Biennale and was later purchased by the New York Guggenheim Museum in 2016 as part of the Guggenheim UBS MAP Global Art Initiative. Laura van Straaten of Artnet News wrote that it was a highlight of the exhibition. The Financial Times said that Flying Carpets established the artist as among the few "capable of crafting complex socio-political histories into an organic, autonomous poetry".

In May 2012, Kaabi-Linke exhibited in "Chkoun Ahna" at the Tunisian National Museum of Carthage. The show, co-curated by her partner, focused on questions of Tunisian identity following the 2010 Jasmine Revolution. The artist's 2012 commentary work, Smell, displayed the Shahada Muslim declaration of faith in jasmine atop a black flag, symbols of Islamic extremism and Tunisia, respectively. The flowers would decay against the background of the flag. The same year, after meeting many survivors of domestic violence during her 2012 residency in the London Delfina Foundation, Kaabi-Linke wanted to publicize the prevalence of the often marginalized crime. She created a work, Impunities London Originals, in 2012 using prints of scars from domestic violence, depicted in black powder smudges on paper.

Impunities London exhibited alongside other works in the theme of masculine overreach at her 2015 second solo show in the Lawrie Shabibi gallery of Dubai. The show explored the emergence of machismo culture from themes of war heroism, exploitation, and violence, and machismo's relation to the seven deadly sins. Its central work, The Altarpiece, is an ink and wax print triptych in a gold leaf frame that visualizes war through its depiction of a World War II-era Berlin bunker. Civilians were forced to build the depicted bunker, which held private artworks from the Boros Collection as of the exhibition. ArtAsiaPacific wrote that the bullet holes on the walls of the bunker symbolized the wounds of Germany's involvement in the war. The magazine compared the work's format to that of early Christian art and considered the work "an allegory for the political strategy of covering up the past for a more favorable present" (revisionism). Tunisian Americans (2012) invoked the burial of American soldiers from the 1942 Tunisia Campaign, occupying foreign territory even in death. Grindballs, Hardballs, and Bangballs (2015) captured sand, cement, and pollen inside bubble wrap to reflect the masculine impulse to exploit the environment. A Short Story of Salt and Sun (2013), an ink and wax painting, comes from a print of a Tunisian resort's eroded wall to reflect on the inescapable erosion of man's creations and the decline of tourism in Tunisia. Artforum's Stephanie Bailey wrote that Kaabi-Linke was both concise and sincere", with a "severity" offset by the "lightness" with which she navigates topical issues. The Dallas Museum of Art purchased her Tunisian Americans at the April 2016 Dallas Art Fair, and the Burger Collection purchased Impunities, London, in 2014. The M+ Museum of Visual Culture bought Modulor I, part of the Kaabi-Linke's Art Basel Hong Kong Discoveries Prize showing, in 2014. The Museum of Modern Art and Samdani Art Foundation also acquired work by Kaabi-Linke.

Among prior works, the artist's 2014 exhibition at the London Mosaic Rooms featured a video piece, No, in which a disembodied mouth chants questions from an immigration visa interrogation, to which church congregants chant the replies. The video installation had previously debuted at the 2012 Liverpool Biennale. Kaabi-Linke's 2015 solo show at the Dallas Contemporary explored themes of international borders. A performance at the show ran its duration, wherein volunteers circled two poles while unraveling the 3,000 kilometers of thread, to create a symbolic wall that represents the length of the border the United States shares with Mexico. In an interview, she said that she was interested in the recent resurgence of geopolitical borders, such as the Mexico–United States border and the separation of the Islamic and Western worlds. She also reflected on her own experiences with immigration bureaucracies. As part of her practice, Kaabi-Linke takes prints of city walls, which she finds expressive of the city's history. Hyperallergic described Kaabi-Linke's six Dallas pieces as having high conceptual impact for addressing heavy political themes (e.g., politics of borders, identity, and military) with delicate media (e.g., hair, language, and thread).

In 2021, the King Abdulaziz Center for World Culture announced Kaabi-Linke as the winner of the 4th edition of the Ithra Art Prize. She was granted USD 100,000 to create work for the Diryah Contemporary Art Biennale.

== Personal life ==
Kaabi-Linke is married and has two sons, born in early 2013 and late 2017. She lives in Berlin and Kyiv and speaks six languages.

== Selected exhibitions ==
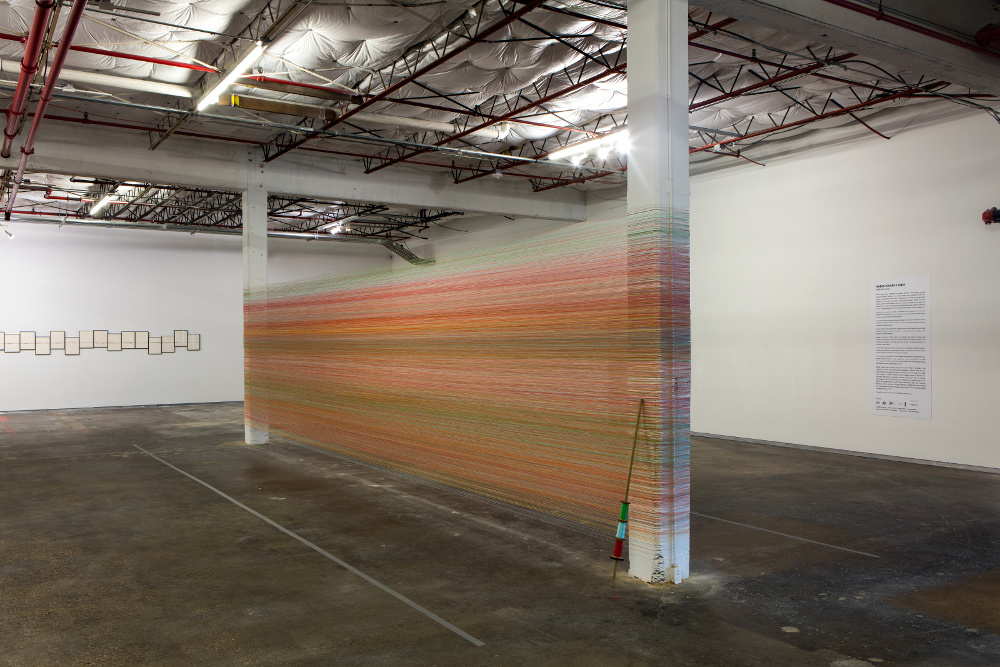
Walk the Line (2015), installation view at Dallas Contemporary, 2019 km of yarn

Solo

- "Sealed Time", Kunstmuseum Bonn, Germany, 2017
- "Walk the Line", Dallas Contemporary, Dallas, Texas, 2015
- "The Future Rewound & The Cabinet of Souls", Mosaic Rooms, London, 2014
- "Stranded", Calouste Gulbenkian Museum, Lisbon, 2014

Group

- "But a Storm Is Blowing from Paradise: Contemporary Art of the Middle East and North Africa", Guggenheim UBS MAP Global Art Initiative, Solomon R. Guggenheim Museum, New York, 2016
- "Chkoun Ahna", National Museum of Carthage, Tunis, May 2012
