= Tod Williams Billie Tsien Architects =

American architectural firm

Tod Williams Billie Tsien Architects is an architectural firm founded in 1986, based in New York. Williams and Tsien began working together in 1977. Their studio focuses on work for institutions including museums, schools, and nonprofit organizations.

== Founders ==
Tod Williams (born 1943, Detroit, Michigan) received his undergraduate, MFA, and Master of Architecture degrees from Princeton University, after graduating from the Cranbrook School in Bloomfield Hills. He is the father of model Rachel Williams and filmmaker Tod "Kip" Williams, both by his first wife, dancer Patricia Agnes Jones, whom he met while studying at Princeton. Williams is a Fellow of the American Academy in Rome and serves as a trustee of the Cranbrook Educational Community. He has been inducted into the American Academy of Arts and Letters, National Academy, American Philosophical Society (2017), and American Academy of Arts and Sciences.

Billie Tsien (born 1949, Ithaca, New York) received her undergraduate degree in Fine Arts from Yale University and her M. Arch. from UCLA. She has worked with Williams since 1977 and they have been in partnership since 1986. Tsien is currently President of the Architectural League of New York and Director of the Public Art Fund. She has been inducted into the American Academy of Arts and Letters, the National Academy, the American Philosophical Society, and the American Academy of Arts and Sciences. Tsien was one of the recipients of the Visionary Woman Awards presented by Moore College of Art and Design in 2009. President Biden appointed her to the U.S. Commission of Fine Arts in 2021.

== Teaching ==
Williams and Tsien have taught at the Cooper Union, Harvard University, Cornell University, University of Texas, City College of New York, Yale University, and University of Chicago.

== Recognition ==
Williams and Tsien are the recipients of more than two dozen awards from the American Institute of Architects. They received a 2014 International Fellowship from the Royal Institute of British Architects and the 2013 Firm of the Year Award from the American Institute of Architects. In 2013, each was awarded a National Medal of Arts from President Obama. They have received the American Academy of Arts and Letters’ Brunner Award, the New York City AIA Medal of Honor, the Cooper-Hewitt National Design Award, the Thomas Jefferson Medal in Architecture, the Municipal Art Society’s Brendan Gill Prize, and the Chrysler Award for Innovation in Design. received Praemium Imperiale(2019)

== Selected works ==
Photo	Name	Location	Inaugurated year	Source
	David Geffen Hall	New York, NY	2024	
	Obama Presidential Center	Chicago, IL		
	Andlinger Center for Energy and the Environment	Princeton University, Princeton, NJ	2015	
	Tata Consultancy Services	Banyan Park, Mumbai, India	2014	
	LeFrak Center at Lakeside	Prospect Park, NY	2013	
	Savidge Library Addition	The MacDowell Colony, Peterborough, NH	2013	
	Asia Society Hong Kong Centre	Admiralty, Hong Kong	2012	
	Barnes Foundation	Philadelphia, PA	2012	
	Reva and David Logan Center for the Arts	University of Chicago	2012	
	Kim & Tritton Residence Halls	Haverford College, Haverford, PA	2012	
	Center for the Advancement of Public Action	Bennington College, Bennington, VT	2011	
	David Rubinstein Atrium at Lincoln Center	New York, NY	2009	
	C.V. Starr East Asian Library	University of California, Berkeley, CA	2008	
	Skirkanich Hall for bioengineering	University of Pennsylvania, Philadelphia	2006	
	Phoenix Art Museum	Phoenix, AZ	2006, 1996	
	The Robin Hood Foundation Library Initiative	various locations, New York, NY	2004-5	
	First Congregational United Church of Christ	Washington, DC	2001	
	American Folk Art Museum	45 and 47 West 53rd Street, New York, NY	2001, demolished in 2014	
	Mattin Center (student arts and activities center)	Johns Hopkins University, Baltimore, MD	2001	
	Cranbrook Natatorium	Cranbrook Schools, Bloomfield Hills, MI	1999	
	Helen S. Cheels Aquatic Center	Emma Willard School, Troy, NY	1998	
	Long Island Residence	Wainscott, NY	1998	
	Hunter Science Center	Emma Willard School, Troy, NY	1996	
	The Neurosciences Institute	The Scripps Research Institute, San Diego, CA	1995	
	Hereford College	University of Virginia, Charlottesville, VA	1992	
	Whitney Museum of American Art Downtown Branch	New York, NY	1988	
	Feinberg Hall	Princeton University, Princeton, NJ	1986	

== Selected publications ==
- Art and Use. School of Architecture and Planning, University at Buffalo, The State University of New York, 2007
- Work/Life. Monacelli Press, 2000.
- “The Physical Space of Science: The Neurosciences Institute and Skirkanich Hall.” Cell Cycle (Georgetown, Tex.), vol. 9, no. 1, Taylor & Francis, 2010, pp. 28–31.
- “Domestic Arrangements: A Lab Report. Tod Williams and Billie Tsien.” Design Quarterly (Minneapolis, Minn.), no. 152, The MIT Press, 1991, pp. 21–28.
- “Peas and Carrots.” Oz, vol. 18, no. 1, 1996.
- “Talking Houses.” Oz, vol. 25, no. 1, 2003.
- “Roxy Paine.” Bomb (New York, N.Y.), no. 107, New Art Publications, 2009, pp. 38–45.
- “Liberty.” Heresies, no. 11, Heresies Collective, Inc, 1981, p. 38.

== Sources ==
- Tod Williams, "Ascension", in Archipelago: Essays on Architecture, edited by P. MacKeith, Helsinki, Rakennustieto, 2006
- Billie Tsien, "The cuts through the heart", in Archipelago: Essays on Architecture.
- Tod Williams and Billie Tsien, The 1998 Charles and Ray Eames Lecture, Michigan Architecture Papers, University of Michigan Press, 1999.
- Douglas Heller, Tod Williams Billie Tsien and Associates: An Annotated Bibliography, Council of Planning Librarians, 1993.
- Tod Williams and Billie Tsien, Work/Life, New York, Monacelli Press, 2000.
- Kester Rattenbury, Robert Bevan, and Kieran Long, Architects Today, New York, Laurence King Publishing, 2006.
