= Javier Téllez =

Venezuelan artist

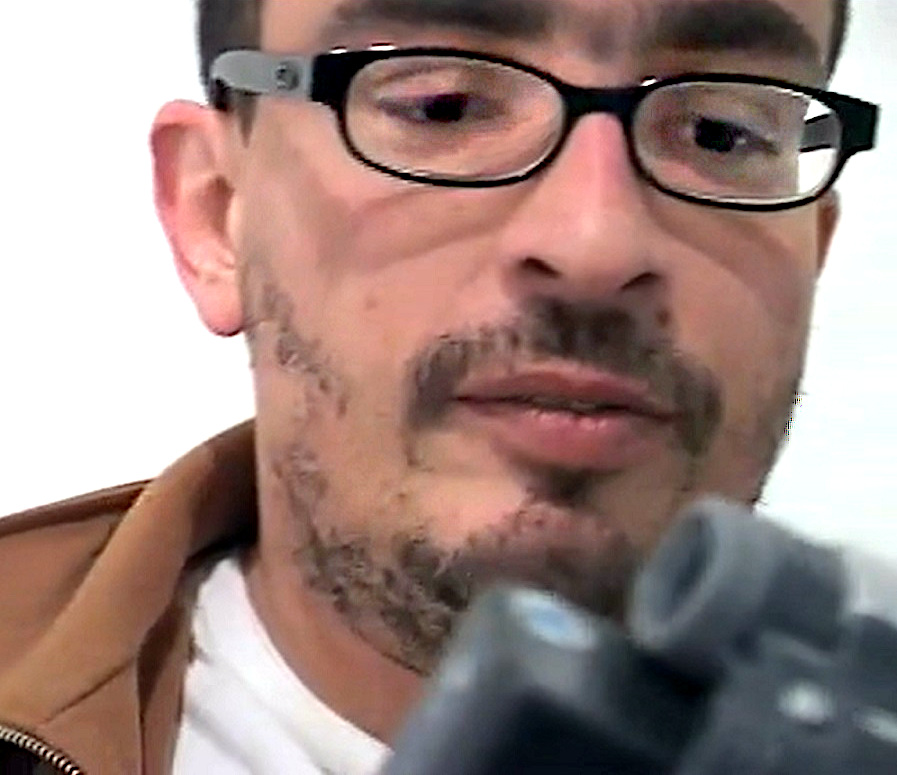
- Javier Téllez in 2009
- Born: 1969 (age 56–57); Venezuela
- Education: Whitney Independent Study Program (1993-94)
- Occupations: Visual artist, Filmmaker

Javier Téllez is a Venezuelan artist and filmmaker, living and working in New York City.

== Early life ==
Javier Téllez was born in 1969 in Valencia, Venezuela. Both his mother and father were psychiatrists, thus exposing Téllez to ideas and concepts about mental illness from a young age. His father worked at Bárbula Psychiatric Hospital in Venezuela and would sometimes treat patients with his son in the same room. Téllez has spoken about attending carnivals at the hospital—known for its progressive, alternative treatment methods—where patients and psychiatrists would switch uniforms to symbolically invert their stereotypical, daily roles. This later became influential in his work and inspired his interest in masks and the carnivalesque.

In 1911, his grandfather founded one of the first movie theaters in Venezuela. As a child Téllez would spend time in the projection booth, sparking his interest in film from a young age.

Téllez has commented on his memories of visiting art museums as a child and drawing connections between museums and psychiatric hospitals saying “both institutions are symbolic representations of authority, founded on taxonomies based on the normal and the pathological, inclusion and exclusion.”

He was a participant in the P.S. 1 International Studio Program in 1993-1994, the Whitney Independent Study Program in 1997-1998, the Gasworks Studio Program, London in 1999, and received a Guggenheim Fellowship in 1999. In 2010 was invited to the DAAD Residency in Berlin, Germany

Téllez has been openly critical of the corruption and class conflicts in his native Venezuela, opting to turn down his invitation to represent Venezuela at the 50th Venice Biennial.

== Techniques and processes ==
Javier Téllez is widely known for his films which feature patients from psychiatric institutions, thus allowing traditionally marginalized groups of people the power to narrate their own stories. While his interest in film was in part inspired by his grandfather, Téllez sees film as a medium with which one can expose reality and therefore easily lends itself to the ideas and intention of his work. Due to the nature of working with untrained actors, Téllez notes that his films oftentimes lead to unexpected results and surprises, therefore his films contain elements of both fictional and documentary film styles.

By bringing to light how mental illness has been constructed and represented, Téllez has been able to draw connections between madness and otherness and how these ideals are in direct opposition to Western ideals. Téllez's work with psychiatric patients grapples with issues of otherness, specifically how poverty, social class, and gender have influenced treatment, popular perception, and representation of mental illness. Téllez has said, “The point of my work is not to cure psychiatric patients; perhaps the cure is really for those who go to see the work in the museum.”

Before beginning a new project, Téllez introduces himself to a new group of patients by screening past works which helps build a sense of continuity among his body of work. Additionally, he will show other films and resources that help contextualize his work and the theme or motifs he hopes to utilize in the particular project or commission. For example, when working on his 2006 Oedipus Marshall, Tellez showed patients classic Western films such as Johnny Guitar, High Noon, and Édipo Rei. Together, Téllez and the patients will discuss ideas, develop the plot and script, and make casting decisions. Téllez sees this collaboration as an integral part of his process, noting the ethical necessity of having these sorts of discussion when working with traditionally marginalized groups of people, but he admits that his collaboration hardly constitutes a collective work environment.

Masks serve an important function in Téllez's films, drawing on ideas about the carnivalesque. The masks serve as a method in which participants can momentarily shed or alter their usual identities, providing the wearer with temporary freedom from social norms. Other common motifs in Téllez's work include mimicry, chalkboards, and disembodied voices.

While Téllez is known primarily for his use of film, he has also used photography, objects, and sculpture in his installations. For several of his exhibitions, including Bedlam (1999) at P.S. 1 Contemporary Art Center and Liftoff (2001), Téllez has constructed large scale birdhouses which entrap the viewer and serve as a subtle reference to Ken Kesey’s One Flew Over the Cuckoo's Nest. In a 2004 exhibition at The Bronx Museum of the Arts, Téllez constructed a large scale, plywood birdhouse with over a hundred white whiffle balls hanging from the ceiling in randomly arranged clusters. The whiffle balls, commonly popular bird toys, are a subtle reference to Kesey’s work, while also serving to represent stray thoughts confined in a cage-like cranium. Expanding on the idea of entrapment, his 2001 Choreutics installation included a giant spider web in the form of a fish trap, and Calligari and the Somnambulist (2008) was projected in a room constructed of chalkboards.

Using sculptural elements allows Téllez to elaborate on the concept of “the architecture of confinement”: the idea that patients with mental illness are forced into institutions and exiled from the rest of society, thereby making the institutions themselves a form of architectural straitjacket.

== Notable works ==
- Choreutics (2001): Produced for Plateau of Humankind at the 49th Venice Biennale in 2001, curated by Harald Szeemann. The title is a reference to dance theorist Rudolf Laban's ideas on the analysis of movements meant to liberate bodily movements from the traditional confines of classical dance. The film documents villagers who have Huntington's Chorea, a rare, hereditary, neurological disorder which causes outbursts, facial contortions, and involuntary, jerking movements of the body. In rural fishing villages near Lake Maracaibo in Venezuela, the number of incidents of the disease are seven hundred times higher than in other parts of the world, but due to the isolation and poverty levels in these villages, the Venezuelan government has undertaken little medical or social assistance for the villagers. The film documents those with the condition struggling to perform even the simplest of tasks such as smiling at the camera or smoking a cigarette. The disease is believed to have been introduced to the area by Spanish sailors, thus Téllez makes the connection between the otherness and colonial encounters.
- La Passion de Jeanne d’Arc (Rozelle Hospital) (2004): Based on Carl Theodor Dreyer’s La Passion de Jeanne d’Arc, Téllez addresses how gender has historically impacted constructions and diagnoses of mental illness. Inter-titles from Dreyer's original film, re-written to tell the story of a new patient at the hospital who experiences delusions of grandeur believing she is Joan of Arc, are paired underneath individual monologues from female patients at Rozelle Hospital in Sydney. Each narrative begins with a series of frontal, side, and back-head shots of the women, referencing physiognomy and the idea that certain physical traits and facial features were linked to mental illness. Téllez draws the connection between the martyrdom of Joan of Arc and the process of institutionalization.
- One Flew Over the Void (2005): Created for InSite, a public art biennial at the contentious Tijuana-San Diego border, Téllez staged a live circus act culminating in the expulsion of David ‘Human Cannonball’ Smith from a cannon over the border into Playas de Tijuana from Border Field State Park in San Diego, the first ever example of a human being projected over an international border. Patients from CESAM State Psychiatric Hospital in Mexicali began by slowly marching down to a solemn trumpet rendition of the typically upbeat, mariachi ballad of the prodigal son, while holding signs with phrases such as, “La realidad entre la sanidad mental y la perdida de la razon es muy tenue,” (There is a very fine line between mental sanity and the loss of reason) which culminates in a disorderly stage performance and the cannonball projection. In the film, Téllez comments on the tension of the border, most notably the otherization of illegal immigrants and laborers. This work is in the Guggenheim Collection as part of the Guggenheim UBS Map Global Art Initiative.
- Oedipus Marshal (2006) was commissioned by the Aspen Art Museum. The cowboy culture nostalgic, Western style remake of Sophocles’ Oedipus Rex was made in collaboration with patients from the Oasis Clubhouse psychiatric facility in Grand Junction, Colorado. The film begins with lingering shots over a ghost town with actors in masks playing Oedipus, Jocasta, Teiresias, and other fortunetellers and ends with the actors shyly smiling as they remove their masks, suggesting the momentary freedom the masks have allowed them.
- Letter on the Blind for the Use of Those Who See (2007): An homage to his mother who lost her vision in the later stages of her life, the film is inspired by the Hindu fable "The Blind Men and the Elephant." The film shows six blind participants touching different parts of an elephant and records their reactions. Just as the actors can never fully experience the animal, the viewer of the film can never fuller experience blindness.
- Calligari and the Somnambulist (2008): A re-enactment of Robert Wiene's 1920 film Das Kabinet des Dr. Caligari, the first feature film to take on the subject of psychiatric institutions, and includes footage of the patients watching Wiene's original film. Téllez was inspired by the link between hypnosis and cinema, specifically auditory and visual hallucinations.

== Select exhibitions ==
Téllez first solo institutional show was "La extracción de la piedra de la locura" in 1996 at Museum of Fine Art, Caracas.

Téllez has been the subject of solo exhibitions at Center for art, research and Alliances, New York (2024); Thurgau Kunstmuseum, Warth, Switzerland (2022); Guggenheim Museum Bilbao (2018); the Memorial Art Gallery, Rochester (2018); the Blanton Museum, Austin; the San Francisco Art Institute (2014); Kunsthaus Zürich (2014); SMAK, Ghent (2013); Museum of Contemporary Art Cleveland (2011); CAM-Gulbenkian Foundation, Lisbon (2010); Aspen Art Museum (2006); The Power Plant, Toronto (2005); Bronx Museum of the Arts, New York (2005); and Museo Tamayo, Mexico City (2000). He has participated in group exhibitions at Guggenheim Museum, New York; MoMA PS1, Long Island City; Museum Boijmans Van Beuningen, Rotterdam; Castello di Rivoli, Torino; Neue Nationalgalerie, Berlin; ZKM, Karlsruhe, Germany; Museum of Fine Arts, Houston; ICA, Boston; and Renaissance Society, Chicago, as well as Aichi Triennial (2019); dOCUMENTA, Kassel, Germany (2012); Manifesta, Trento, Italy; Sydney Biennial; and the Whitney Biennial, New York (all 2008); Venice Biennale (2001 and 2003); and Yokohama Triennial (2001). He received a Guggenheim Fellowship in 1999, and in 2016 the Global Mental Health Award for Innovation in the Arts from Columbia University, New York.

He has been featured in group shows at P. S. 1 Contemporary Art Center, New York, Museum Boijmans Van Beuningen, Rotterdam, Museo de Bellas Artes, Caracas, Frankfurter Kunstverein, Frankfurt, Castello di Rivoli, Torino, Zentrum für Kunst und Medientechnologie, Karlsruhe, Germany, Museum of Fine Arts Houston, Haus der Kulturen der Welt, Berlin, Institute of Contemporary Art, Boston, the Yokohama Triennial (2001), Venice Biennale (2001 and 2003), Manifesta, Trento, Italy (2008), Sydney Biennial (2008), Whitney Biennial, New York (2008), Documenta, Kassel, Germany (2012), and the Solomon R. Guggenheim Museum, New York (2014).

He has participated in residencies with the Rema Hort Mann Foundation, New York (2000), Art in General, New York (2002), Récollets, Paris (2006), Baltic Art Centre, Visby, Sweden (2007), and Deutscher Akademischer Austausch Dienst, Berlin (2010).

== Collections ==
Work by the artist is held in major museum collections worldwide, including Blanton Museum of Art, Austin, TX; FRAC Nord Pas-de-Calais, Dunkerque, France; Fondation Louis Vuitton, Paris; Fundaçao Calouste Gulbenkian, Lisbon; Fundació la Caixa, Barcelona; Hall Art Foundation, Derneburg, Germany; Kunsthaus Zürich; Memorial Art Gallery (MAG), Rochester; Museo de Bellas Artes (MBA), Caracas; Museo Nacional Centro de Arte Reina Sofia, Madrid, Spain; Museo de Arte Contemporáneo de Castilla y León (MUSAC); Museum Het Domein, Sittard, Netherlands; Museum of Fine Arts, Houston; Museum of Modern Art (MoMA), New York; Neue Nationalgalerie, Berlin; Nouveau Musée National de Monaco; Pinault Collection, Paris; Princeton University Art Museum; Solomon R. Guggenheim Museum, New York; S.M.A.K., Ghent; Tate Modern, London.

== Awards ==
In 2025, Javier Tellez was awarded the Pérez Prize from the Pérez Art Museum Miami, Florida, for his artistic achievements. The award is an unrestricted cash grant of $50,000.
