= Vandy Rattana =

Cambodian-Taiwanese photographer and artist

Vandy Rattana (born 1980 in Phnom Penh, Cambodia) is a photographer and artist, now resident in Taiwan, whose work is concerned with Cambodian society.

== Photojournalism ==
One of a generation born into the fragile period after the fall of Pol Pot whose Khmer Rouge regime (1975–79) executed most artists and intellectuals, Phnom Penh-born Vandy Rattana cut short his studies in law at the Paññāsāstra University of Cambodia in 2005 to teach himself photography. While attending some short courses he was encouraged by American Erin Gleeson (curator and specialist in contemporary art from Cambodia and until recently director of Sa Sa Bassac).

Following the footsteps of Vietnam War era Cambodian photojournalists Sou Vichith, Dith Pran and Tae Kim Heang, Rattana was inspired by the capacity of photojournalism to bear witness and its potential to document Cambodia's troubled and damaged culture, and to provoke activism.

== Artist ==
In 2007 he and five other artists Heng Ravuth, Khvay Samnang, Kong Vollak, Lim Sokchanlina, and Vuth Lyno founded the collective Stiev Selapak (Art Rebels) which in 2009 opened the alternative space Sa Sa Art Gallery in Phnom Penh. In 2010 they launched Sa Sa Art Projects in 2010 in order to host artist residencies, workshops, and community-based collaborations. In 2011, Sa Sa Art Gallery merged with BASSAC Art Projects to become SA SA BASSAC.

Before he left Stiev Selapak in 2012, Rattana was influenced by this contact with other artists and by Erin Gleeson to the effect that Rattana's work moved gradually away from straight documentary to incorporate the procedures of conceptual art. Preoccupied with the everyday as experienced by the average Cambodian, his early, so-called Self-portrait series (2005–06) does not show himself, but searches for the ideal of home amongst images of family members in domestic interiors, while Looking In (2005–2006) examines his own workplace to offer candid insights into Cambodian office life. Fire of the year (2008) deals with contemporary environmental issues in the ecological wasteland on the outskirts of Phnom Penh. Walking Through (2008–09) shows labour conditions in the environment of a traditional rubber plantation in Kampong Cham province. His short video Monologue offers up homage to the sister he never met, interred in a mass burial site alongside his grandmother and five thousand others who were discarded during the Khmer Rouge regime in 1978.

== Recognition ==
Rattana achieved international acclaim for Bomb Ponds (2009), acquired for the Guggenheim UBS MAP Global Art Initiative in 2012. In this he documented the devastation wrought by the U.S. Vietnam-era carpet bombing operations on Cambodia's landscape, and uncovered the history by engaging the collective memory of people of the ten most severely bombed provinces.

Rattana has had solo exhibitions in Phnom Penh at Popil PhotoGallery (2006–07), Sa Sa Art Gallery (2009), and SA SA BASSAC (2011 and 2012–13), and overseas at venues including Hessel Museum of Art in Annandale-on-Hudson, New York (2010). He was an invited participant in significant curated international group exhibitions including Underlying: Contemporary Art Exhibition from the Mekong Sub-Region (2008); Strategies from Within: Vietnamese and Cambodian Contemporary Art at Ke Center in Shanghai (2008); the 6th Asia Pacific Triennial at Queensland Art Gallery in Brisbane, Australia (2009); Forever Until Now: Contemporary Art from Cambodia at 10 Chancery Lane Gallery in Hong Kong (2009); Institution for the Future, part of the Asia Triennial Manchester at Chinese Arts Centre in Manchester (2011); Documenta 13 (2012); Poetic Politic at Kadist Art Foundation, San Francisco (2012), and Time of Others at the Museum of Contemporary Art, Tokyo, Japan (2015).

== Exhibitions ==
=== Solo exhibitions ===
- 2018 – Funeral, Institut français du Cambodge, Phnom Penh.
- 2018 Bomb Ponds, Monologue, Funeral, Galerie Chateau d'Eau, Toulouse, France, part of the Festival 'Made In Asia'.
- 2016 – Working-Through: Vandy Rattana and His Ditched Footages, Cube Project Space, Taipei, Taiwan(including Walking Through, Bomb Ponds photos and documentary, Monologue)
- 2015 – MONOLOGUE, Jeu de Paume, Paris, France.
- 2015 – MONOLOGUE, CAPC, Bordeaux, France.
- 2013 – Bomb Ponds, Asia Society Museum, New York City, America.
- 2012 – Surface, SA SA BASSAC, Phnom Penh, Cambodia.
- 2011 – The Bomb Ponds, SA SA BASSAC, Phnom Penh, Cambodia.
- 2010 – The Bomb Ponds, Hessel Museum of Art, New York, America.
- 2009 – Walking Through, Sa Sa Gallery, Phnom Penh, Cambodia.
- 2007 – Chess, Hôtel de la Paix, Siem Reap, Cambodia.
- 2007 – Looking in My Office, Popil Gallery, Phnom Penh, Cambodia.

=== Group exhibitions ===
- 2019 – Singapore Biennale: every step in the right direction (shown Monologue, Funeral, ...far away, over there, the ocean), Singapore Museum of Arts.
- 2019 – screening of Monologue, Making Memory, MCAD, Museum of Contemporary Art and Design (shown Monologue), Manila, The Philippines.
- 2019 – Making Memory, Jewish Museum (shown Monologue), Frankfurt, Germany.
- 2019 – The Breathing of Maps (shown Monologue), Yamaguchi Center for Arts and Media, Japan.
- 2019 – Art Encounters Biennial (shown Monologue), Timișoara, Romania.
- 2019 – Biennale Jogja XV (shown Monologue and Funeral), Jogjakarta, Indonesia.
- 2019 – Sunshower: Contemporary Art from Southeast Asia 1980s to Now (shown Bomb Ponds), Kaohsiung Museum of Fine Arts (KMFA), Taiwan.
- 2019 – 40 ans après, la photographie au Cambodge aujourd'hui (shown Bomb Ponds and Surface), La Filature, Mulhouse, France.
- 2018 – UnAuthorised Medium (shown Bomb Ponds), Framer Framed, Amsterdam, Netherlands.
- 2018 – Two Houses: Politics and Histories in the Contemporary Art Collections of John Chia and Yeap Lam Yang (shown Funeral), Lassale College of Arts, Singapore.
- 2018 – Ausstellung "Still Water. Politiken des Wassers" (shown Bomb Ponds), Hospitalhof, Stuttgart, Germany.
- 2017 – Le Paysage après coup (shown Monologue and Bomb Ponds), Galerie Faux Mouvement, Metz, France.
- 2017 – Sunshower, Contemporary Art from Southeast Asia 1980s to Now (shown Bomb Ponds and Monologue), Mori Art Museum, Tokyo, Japan.
- 2017 – Lines, Borders, Boundaries, and the In-Betweens (shown First High Rise and Boeung Kak Eviction), Yamamoto Gendai Gallery, Tokyo, Japan.
- 2017 – Riverrun (shown Monologue / Bomb Ponds), Taipei Fine Arts Museum, Taiwan.
- 2016 – Anywhere But Here (shown Landscape of Time / Surface), Bétonsalon, Paris, France.
- 2016 – New Narratives Film Festival (shown Monologue / Bomb Ponds), Taipei, Taiwan.
- 2016 – From Generation to Generation: Inherited Memory and Contemporary Art (shown Bomb Ponds), New York, USA.
- 2016 – Embedded South(s) (shown Monologue), online exhibition.
- 2016 – Public spirits (shown Bomb Ponds / Monologue), Center for Contemporary Art Ujzadowski Castle, Warsaw, Poland.
- 2015 – Time of others (MONOLOGUE), Museum of contemporary art, Tokyo, Japan.
- 2015 – Documenting as Method: Photography in Southeast Asia (Walking Through), Chiang Mai Photo Festival, Thailand.
- 2015 – The Khmer Rouge and the consequences. Documentation as artistic memory work (Ponds and MONOLOGUE), Akademie der Künste, Berlin, Germany.
- 2014 – Looking at the Big Blue Sky, Meta House, Phnom Penh, Cambodia.
- 2014 – In the Aftermath of Trauma, Contemporary Video Installations (Bomb Ponds), Kemper Art Museum, America.
- 2014 – Medicine to Heal: Cambodian Photography since 2000 (Looking in), Xishuangbanna Foto Festival, Yunnan, China.
- 2014 – Lost in Landscape, Mart Museum, Italy.
- 2014 – Concept, Context, Contestation: Art and the collective in Southeast Asia, BACC, Bangkok, Thailand.
- 2013 – No Country: Contemporary Art for South and Southeast Asia (Bomb Ponds), Asia Society, Hong-Kong.
- 2013 – WE=ME (Bomb Ponds), Art Center Silpakorn University, Bangkok, Thailand.
- 2013 – DOCUMENT (Bomb Ponds), Plymouth University Gallery, United Kingdom.
- 2013 – Unknown Forces, Gestures Beyond Surfaces (Bomb Ponds video), Tophane-I Amire Gallery, Istanbul, Turkey.
- 2013 – Out of Nowhere: Photography in Cambodia, Season of Cambodia, New York City, America.
- 2013 – One Step Forward, Two Steps Back – Us and Institution / Us as Institution (Bomb Ponds), Guangdong Times Museum, China.
- 2013 – Bring the world into the world (Bomb Ponds), InterAccess Electronic Media Arts Centreand Art Metropole, Toronto, Canada.
- 2013 – Phnom Penh: Rescue Archaeology (First high-rise), IFA, Berlin + Stuttgart, Germany.
- 2013 – Welcome to the Jungle, Contemporary Art in Southeast Asia from the Collection of Singapore Art Museum (Bomb Ponds), Yokohama Museum of Art, Japan.
- 2012 – Between Fantasy and Reality, Photography from Cambodia (First High-Rise), The East Gallery, Toronto, Canada.
- 2012 – Traces, Jim Thompson Art Center, Bangkok.
- 2012 – Poetic Politic (Bomb Ponds), Kadist Art Foundation, San Francisco, America.
- 2012 – Bomb Ponds Noorderlicht International Photo Festival, Netherlands.
- 2012 – dOCUMENTA 13, "The Brain" (Bomb Ponds), Kassel, Germany.
- 2012 – Bomb Ponds, Eigen+Art Lab, group exhibition, Berlin, Germany.
- 2012 – The Best of Times, The Worst of Times, Rebirth and Apocalypse in Contemporary Art (Bomb Ponds), Kiev Biennale, Ukraine.
- 2012 – Rupture and Revival: Cambodian Photography in the Last Decade, The Institute of Contemporary Arts, Singapore.
- 2012 – Documentaries (Bomb Ponds), Saint Paul St Gallery, Auckland, New Zealand.
- 2012 – Bomb Ponds, collective exhibition at Singapore Art Museum, Singapore.
- 2012 – Bomb Ponds, collective exhibition "Paradise Lost" at 2902 Gallery, Singapore.
- 2011 – Between Utopia and Dystopia, University Museum of Contemporary Art, Mexico.
- 2011 – Institution for the Future, Asia Triennial Manchester II, Chinese Art Center, Manchester, United Kingdom.
- 2011 – Signature Art Prize Finalist Exhibition, Singapore Art Museum, Singapore.
- 2011 – Paradise Lost II, 2902 Gallery, Singapore.
- 2011 – Big Eyes, Sa Sa Art Gallery, Phnom Penh; Cambodia.
- 2009 – Fire of the year, The 6th Asia Pacific Triennial of Contemporary Art (APT6), Brisbane, Australia.
- 2009 – TADAIMA, Looking for Sweet Home, Exhibition of Asian Contemporary Art at Kyushu University, Japan.
- 2009 – Magnetic Power, Group exhibition organized by Asean-Korean Center, Seoul, Korea.
- 2009 – Intro : group exhibition of Stiev Selepak (Art Rebels) SaSa Art gallery, Phnom Penh, Cambodia.
- 2009 – Forever Until Now: Contemporary Art From Cambodia 10 Chancery gallery, Hong Kong.
- 2009 – Chobi Mela V International Photography festival, Dhaka, Bangladesh.
- 2008 – Strategies from within, Contemporary Arts Practice, Ke center for the Contemporary Arts, Shanghai, China.
- 2008 – Transformation, group travelling exhibition of Cambodian and US artists, Phnom Penh, Cambodia and California, USA.
- 2008 – The Contemporary Art of Korea, Japan and the U.S.A. – Difference and Coexistence, ASTO Museum of Art, Wrightwood, California, America.
- 2008 – Gwanghwamoon International Art Festival, Korea and The First Gallery Avenue, Beijing, China.
- 2008 – Road : group travel art exhibition in Thailand, Cambodia, Laos and Vietnam (Mekong Art and Culture Project).
- 2008 – Art of Survival, group art exhibition, Phnom Penh, Cambodia.
- 2007 – Art rebels, group photo exhibition, John Mcdermott Gallery, Siem Reap, Cambodia.
- 2006 – Self-portraits, group exhibition, Noorderlicht, the Netherlands.
- 2005 – Looking In, group exhibition, Popil Gallery, Phnom Penh, Cambodia.

== Collections ==
- Solomon R. Guggenheim Museum New York
- Singapore Art Museum
- Queensland Art Gallery
- Johnson Museum of Art
