= Zun Ei Phyu =

Burmese painter (born 1986)

- ဇွန်အိဖြူ
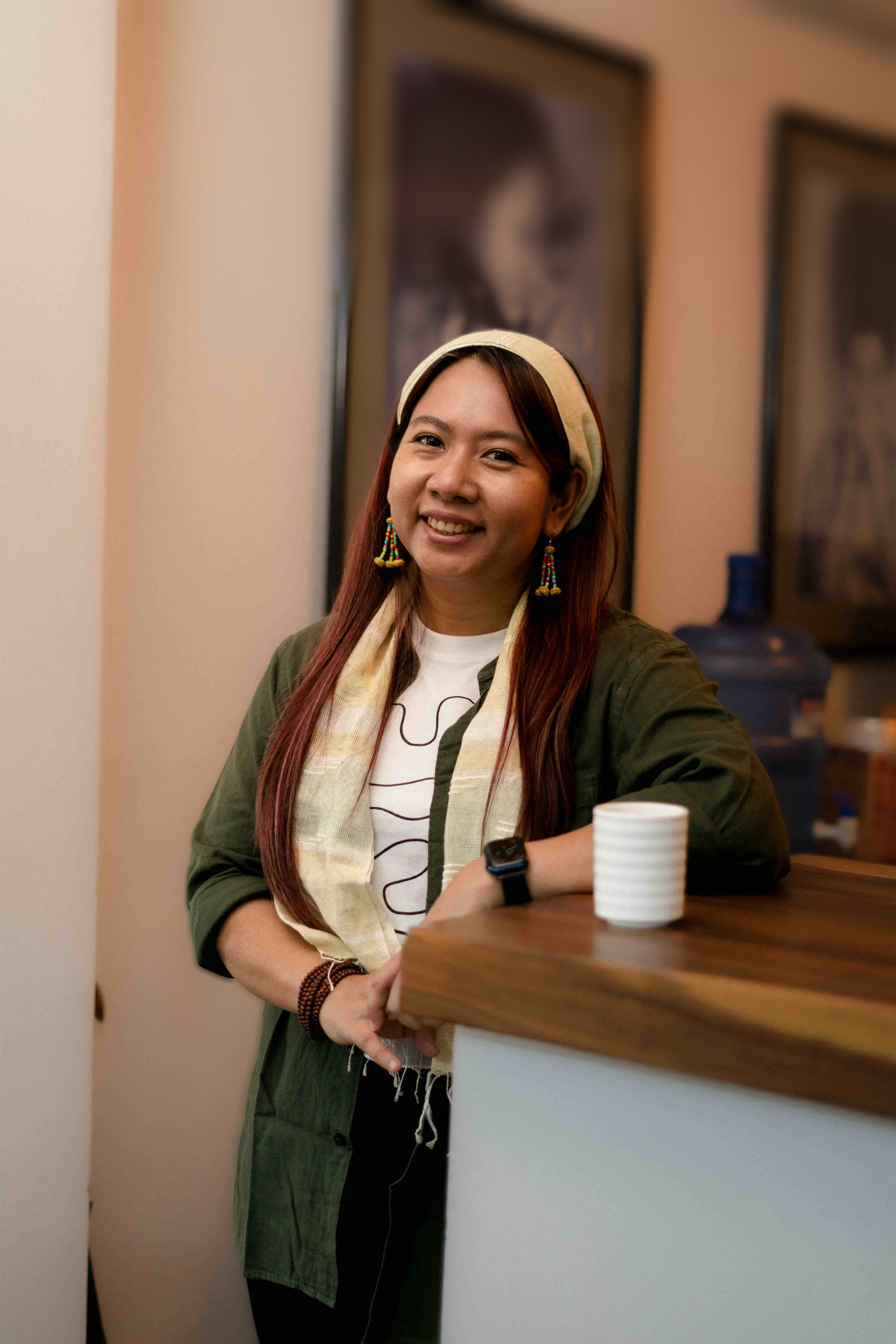
- Portrait of Artist Zun Ei Phyu
- Born: 1986 (age 39–40); Yangon, Myanmar
- Education: Studied under Sandar Khaing, Diploma in Computer Art (2003); M.B., B.S. (Yangon, 2008)
- Occupations: Visual artist, art practitioner, medical doctor
- Movement: Multimedia art, community-engaged art, expressive art therapy
- Website: https://www.zuneiphyu-artist.com/

Zun Ei Phyu (Burmese: ဇွန်အိဖြူ, pronounced [/zʊn eɪ pʰju/]) (b. 1986, Yangon, Myanmar) is a Burmese medical doctor, visual artist, and expressive arts psychotherapist based in Yangon. Her work includes multimedia formats, such as paper-cutting, paper-making, installations, and community-engaged art, often addressing social themes and public interaction.

== Biography ==
Born in Yangon in 1986, Zun Ei Phyu earned a Diploma in Computer Art in 2003 and subsequently received her M.B., B.S. from the University of Yangon in 2008. Over the two decades, she has developed a multimedia art practice that includes paper cuts, installations, and more.

== Artistic career ==
Zun Ei's art often explores social and philosophical themes, especially those affecting children, the elderly, and communities during crisis, with focuses on social change and psychosocial healing. She co-founded Tharaphy Healing Space, where she has facilitated expressive art therapy and healing workshops since around 2019. She has worked with different cultural institutions participated in related activities.

== Art exhibitions and residencies ==
Zun Ei Phyu has participated in multiple exhibitions locally, regionally and internationally.

- Layered Stories (2020, Karin Weber Gallery)
- 20/20 (2019, Hong Kong)
- Yangon Made My Heart Beat Fast: New Contemporary Art from Myanmar (2017)
- Shapeshifting: Contemporary Art from Southeast Asia (2016)
- Silent for a While: Contemporary Art from Myanmar (2016)
- Early exhibitions in Yangon dating back to 1999–2014

Zun Ei Phyu has taken part in several notable international artist residency programs that have significantly shaped her practice. In 2012, she was selected for the Creators in Residency program at Tokyo Wonder Site as part of the JENESYS initiative where she engaged in a three-month residency at Tokyo Wonder Site and gave an artist talk at Tokyo Art University. In 2014, she and her mentor Sandar Khaing participated in a two-month residency at Rimbun Dahan in Kuala Lumpur, Malaysia. Additionally, she's been involved in residency programs across other global centers, including Bali (Indonesia), Bangkok (Thailand), and Vienna (Austria).

== Expressive and community-based projects ==
In 2022, Zun Ei engaged in "Markings of the Cartwheel" (လှည်းဘီးရာများ), a participatory performance developed with TERASIA and Yangon's Thukhuma Khayeethe Theater. Using forum theatre techniques, the performance explored themes of death, morality, and youth perspectives. This was part of TERASIA Online Week 2022 + Onsite, and plans were underway for future presentations including in Indonesia (Sua TERASIA).

== Philosophy and impact ==
Zun Ei believes that “every human being is an artist” and that art can foster mindfulness, healing, and connection to oneself, others, and nature. During crises in Myanmar, her art and therapeutic work aim to support psychosocial resilience and community rebuilding.
