= Hong Kong Visual Arts Centre =

Art gallery in Hong Kong, China

Coordinates: 22.27680°N 114.15933°E

- 香港視覺藝術中心
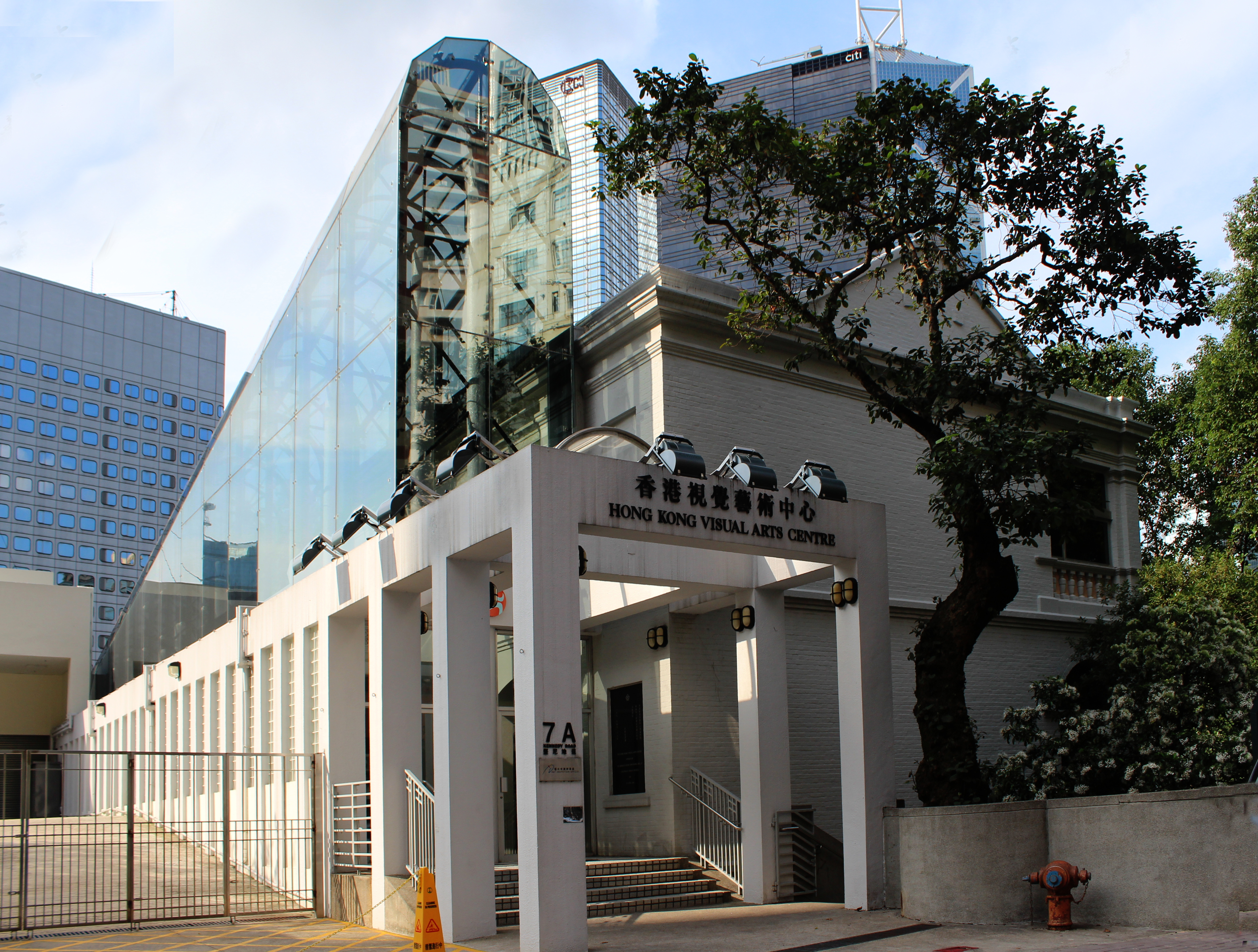
- Interactive map of the Hong Kong Visual Arts Centre area
- Alternative names: vA!

General information
- Opened: 28 April 1992; 34 years ago

Other information
- Public transit: Admiralty station (Exit C1)

Hong Kong Visual Arts Centre
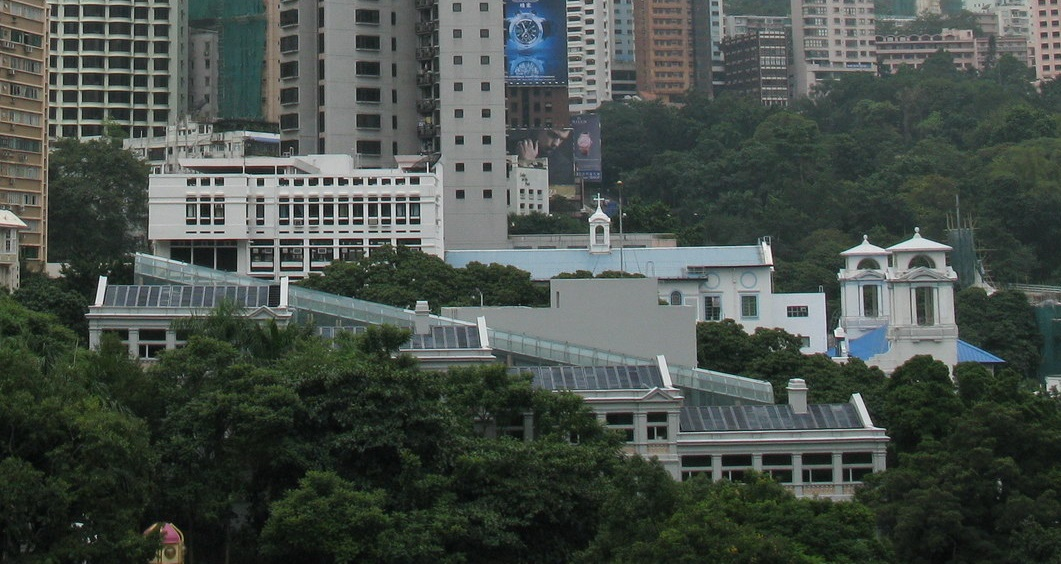
- Side view of Hong Kong Visual Arts Centre, with St. Joseph's College in the background.
- Traditional Chinese: 香港視覺藝術中心
- Simplified Chinese: 香港视觉艺术中心
Transcriptions
Standard Mandarin
- Hanyu Pinyin: Xiānggǎng Shìjué Yìshù Zhōngxīn
Yue: Cantonese
- Sidney Lau: Heung^{1}Gong^{2}Si^{6}Gok^{3}Ngai^{6}Sut^{6}Jung^{1}Sam^{1}

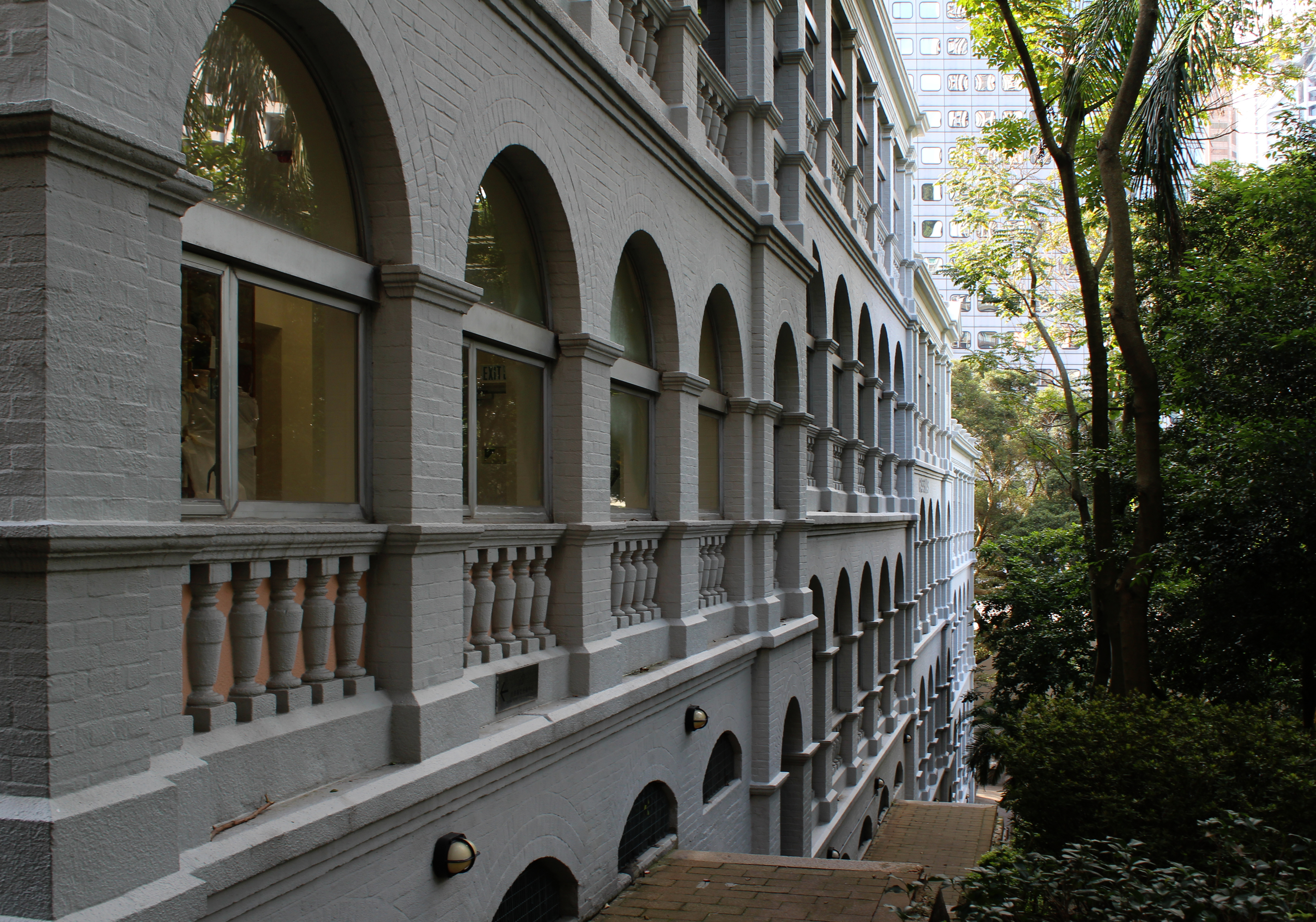
Side view of Hong Kong Visual Arts Centre (bordering Hong Kong Park)

The Hong Kong Visual Arts Centre (branded as vA!) is located in Hong Kong Park, at 7A Kennedy Road above Central, Hong Kong Island, Hong Kong. It was opened by Leung Ding-Bong, then chairman of the Urban Council, on 28 April 1992.

The centre encourages local art creation. It was restructured from an early 20th-century building called Cassels Block, a former barracks for married British officers of Victoria Barracks. It currently provides an area and facilities for local artists and includes modern artefacts and sculptures.

Cassels Block is a three-storey colonial Edwardian classical revival building. It is listed as a Grade I historic building.

== Gallery ==
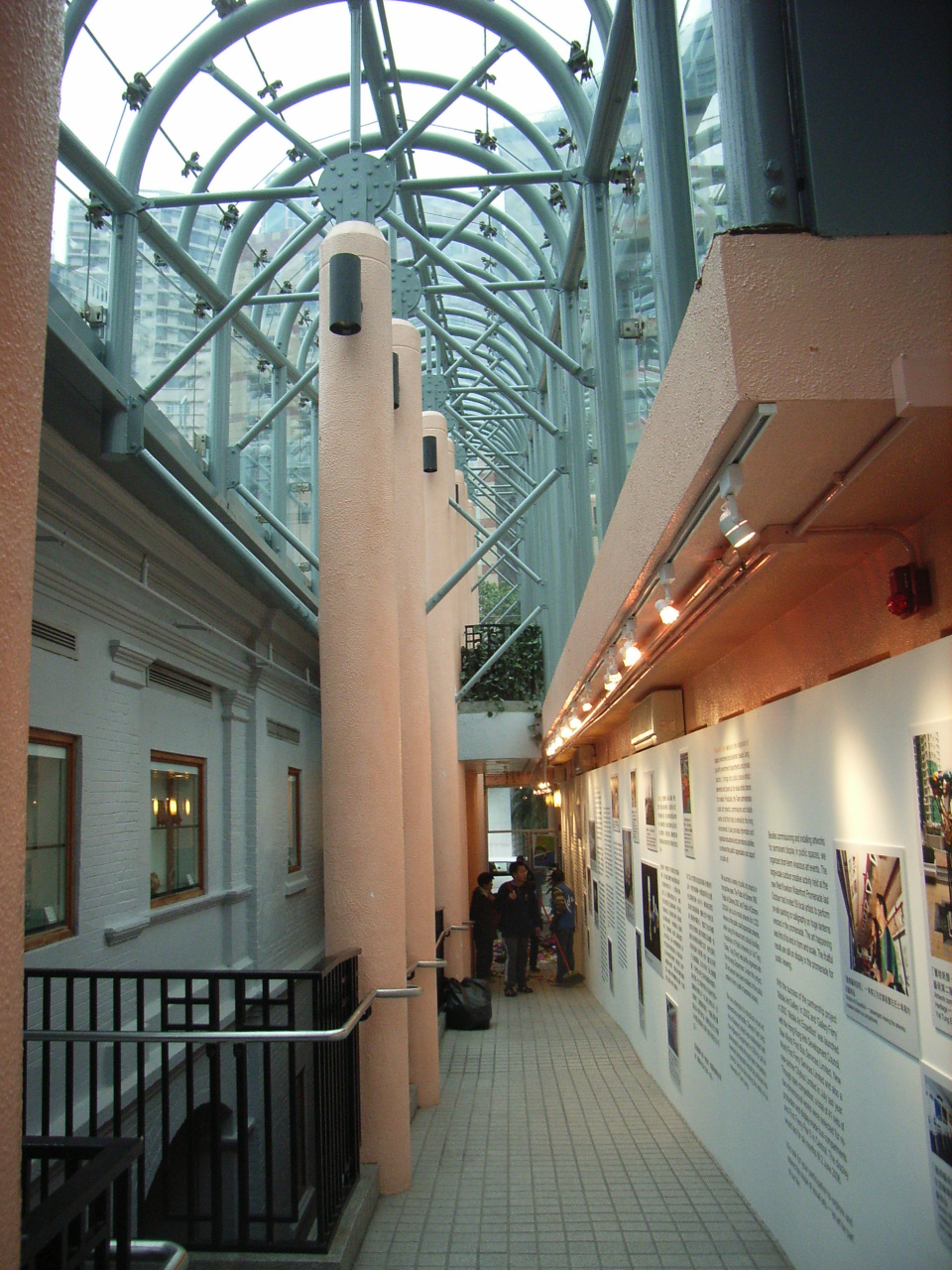
The lobby

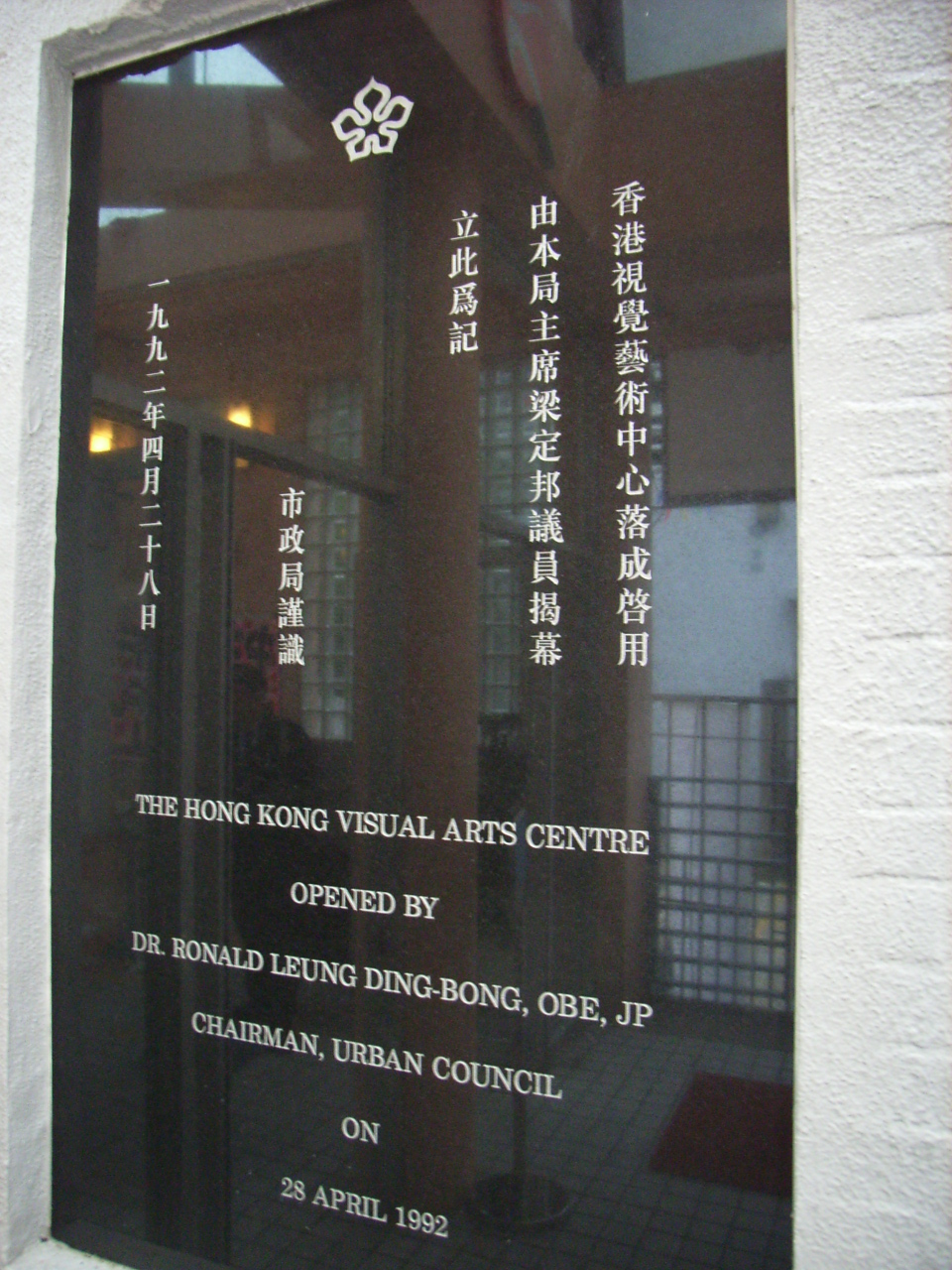
The history

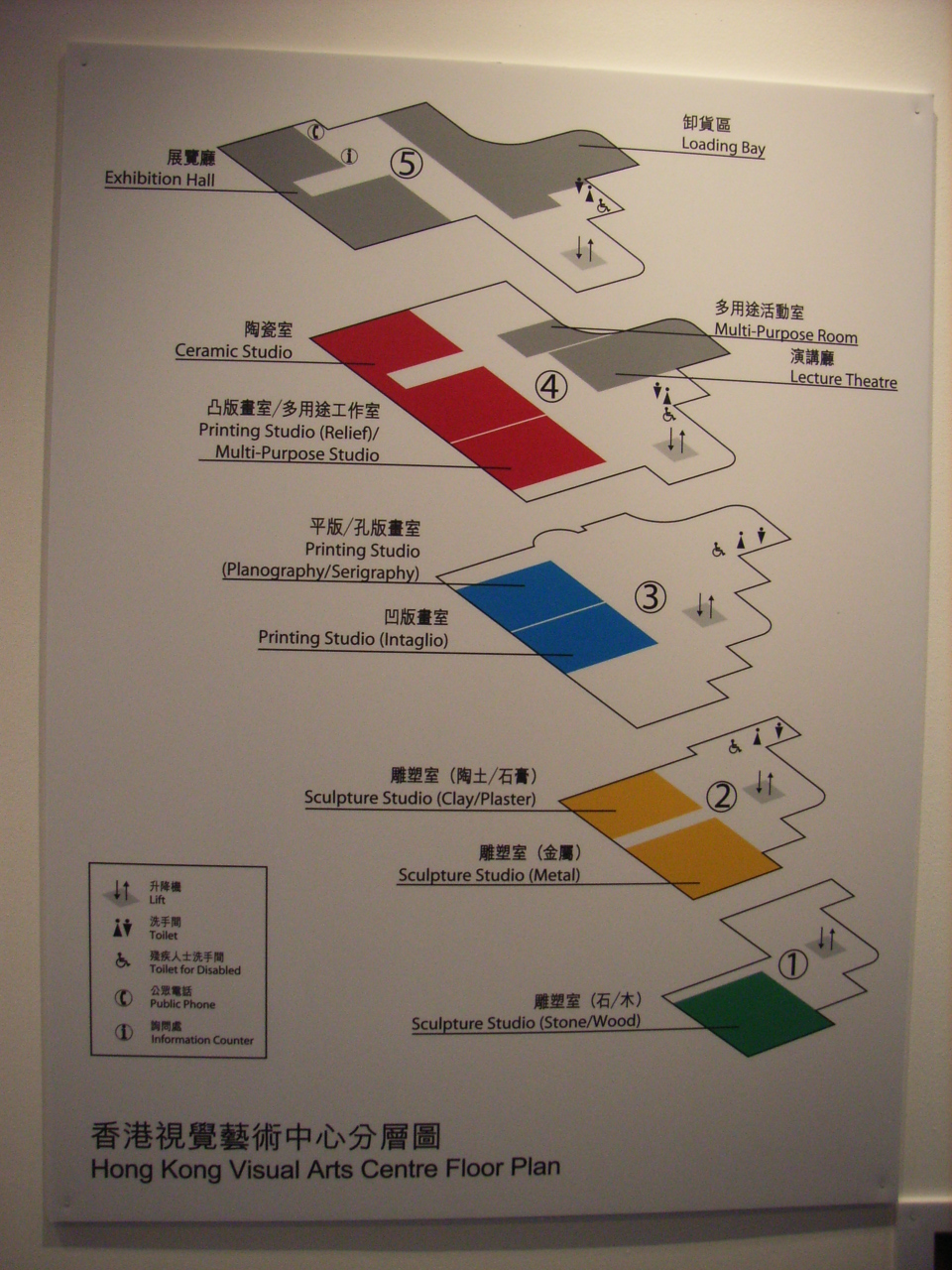
The floor plan

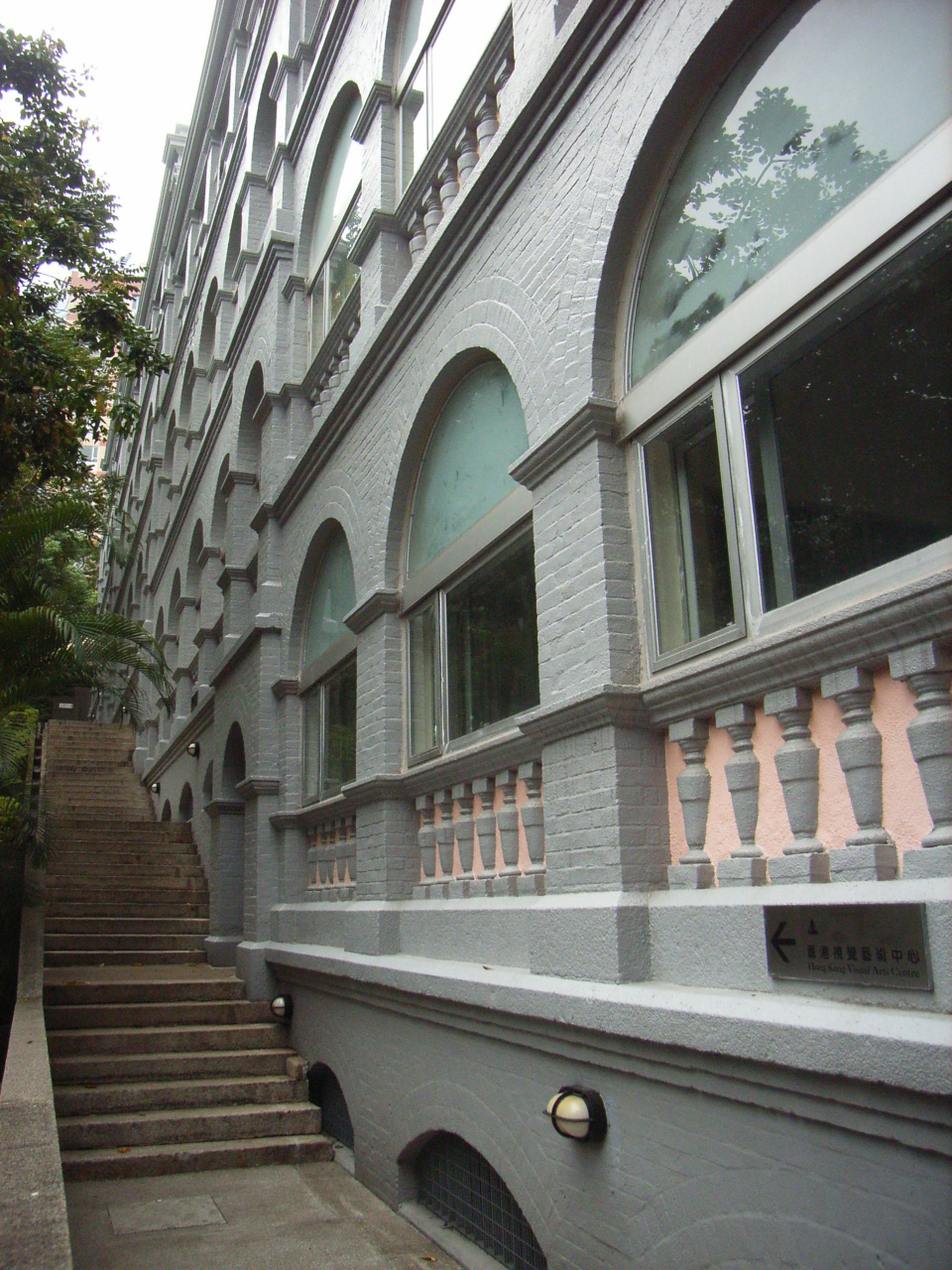
Hong Kong Visual Arts Centre

== See also ==
- List of buildings and structures in Hong Kong
- Museums in Hong Kong
- Victoria Barracks
