= June Yap =

Singaporean curator (born 1974)

- 叶德晶
- Born: 1974 (age 51–52); Singapore
- Education: National University of Singapore; University of Melbourne
- Awards: 2012–2014: Curatorial residency at the Solomon R. Guggenheim Museum, New York City; 2015: Best Exhibition of Asian Contemporary Art at the Prudential Eye Awards, Singapore

June Yap (simplified Chinese: 叶德晶; traditional Chinese: 葉德晶; pinyin: Yè Déjīng; born 1974) is an independent Singaporean curator, art critic, and writer. She was previously the Director of Curatorial & Research at the Singapore Art Museum.

Yap has worked in the curatorial departments of the Solomon R. Guggenheim Museum, New York City, the Institute of Contemporary Arts Singapore, and the Singapore Art Museum. As an independent curator, Yap has further organised shows at the Institut für Auslandsbeziehungen, Stuttgart, at the Osage Gallery, Hong Kong, and the NUS Museum, Singapore. In 2011, Yap curated the Singapore Pavilion at the 54th Venice Biennale, featuring Ho Tzu Nyen's video installation, The Cloud of Unknowing.

== Education ==
Yap holds a BA from the National University of Singapore in philosophy and sociology. She received her MA in Fine Art (Art History) at the University of Melbourne, and her PhD. in Cultural Studies at the National University of Singapore.

== Career ==
From 2003 to 2004, Yap organised new media art exhibitions as a curator at the Singapore Art Museum, later joining the institution's acquisitions committee. Her projects at the Singapore Art Museum from this time include Interrupt (2003), Twilight Tomorrow (2004), Seni: Singapore 2004, and Art & the Contemporary (2004).

Prior to 2008, Yap was the deputy director and Curator of the Institute of Contemporary Arts Singapore, after which she would continue her curatorial practice as an independent curator. In 2008, Yap curated Bound for Glory at the NUS Museum as an independent curator. In 2010, Yap curated You and I, We’ve Never Been so Far Apart: Works From Asia for the Center for Contemporary Art in Tel Aviv for the International Video Art Biennial.

In 2011, Yap was curator for the Singapore Pavilion at the 54th Venice Biennale, featuring The Cloud of Unknowing by Singaporean artist Ho Tzu Nyen, a video installation that drew upon both the titular 14th-century mystical treatise and Hubert Damisch’s semiotic thesis, A Theory of /Cloud/: Toward a History of Painting.

From 2012 to 2014, Yap was selected for a residency at the Solomon R. Guggenheim Museum as part of the Guggenheim UBS MAP Global Art Initiative. During her two-year stint, she was UBS MAP Curator, South and Southeast Asia, and in 2013 she organised the first exhibition of the initiative, No Country: Contemporary Art for South and Southeast Asia, which later in 2014 traveled to the Asia Society Hong Kong Center and the NTU Centre for Contemporary Art Singapore, where the show won Best Exhibition of Asian Contemporary Art at the Prudential Eye Awards. As part of her residency at the Guggenheim, Yap initiated the museum's Perspectives series, which featured essays, stories, and interviews by international artists, writers, and curators, and she would present about the series at a symposium held at the Queens Museum in 2013.

Published in 2016, Yap is the author of Retrospective: A Historiographical Aesthetic in Contemporary Singapore and Malaysia (Petaling Jaya: SIRD, 2016). In 2016, she was a member of the advisory committee of the 5th Singapore Biennale, and was meant to curate the Singapore Pavilion at the 57th Venice Biennale in 2017 before she left the team in January 2017 due to what the Singapore National Arts Council cited as "differences in the operational approaches." In August 2017, she was appointed the Director of Curatorial, Collections and Programmes at the Singapore Art Museum.

In 2020, Yap co-curated the exhibition They Do Not Understand Each Other, with Yuka Uematsu, National Museum of Art, Osaka, at Tai Kwun Contemporary, Hong Kong.

In 2021, Yap curated the exhibition The Gift that was part of Collecting Entanglements and Embodied Histories - a dialogue between the collections of the Singapore Art Museum, Galeri Nasional Indonesia, MAIIAM Contemporary Art Museum and Nationalgalerie – Staatliche Museen zu Berlin, initiated by the Goethe-Institut - with co-curators Anna-Catharina Gebbers, Grace Samboh and Gridthiya Gaweewong. She also presented the exhibition Nam June Paik: The Future is Now as Senior Curator of National Gallery Singapore, a collaborating partner of the touring exhibition with Tate Modern and San Francisco Museum of Modern Art.

Also in 2021, Yap was appointed co-Artistic Director of the seventh edition of the Singapore Biennale opening in 2022, together with Binna Choi from South Korea/the Netherlands, Nida Ghouse from India, living in Germany, and Ala Younis from Jordan. The Biennale was named Natasha in lieu of an exhibition title

In 2024, Yap curated the exhibition Yee I-Lann: Mansau-Ansau and edited On the Mat with Yee I-Lann (Singapore: Singapore Art Museum, 2024) which received Honorable Mention at the DNA Paris Design Awards and Creative Communication Award (C2A) 2025. In 2025, Yap and Kathleen Ditzig co-curated the exhibition Heman Chong: This is a dynamic list and may never be able to satisfy particular standards for completeness.. The publication Haegue Yang: The Cone of Concern (De La Salle-College of Saint Benilde Inc. and Museum of Contemporary Art and Design (MCAD) Manila) where she contributed an essay The Motion of Emotion was awarded the Alfonso T. Ongpin Prize for Best Book on Art at the 43rd National Book Awards (Philippines).
