= Asia Society Hong Kong Centre =

Coordinates: 22.27586°N 114.16532°E

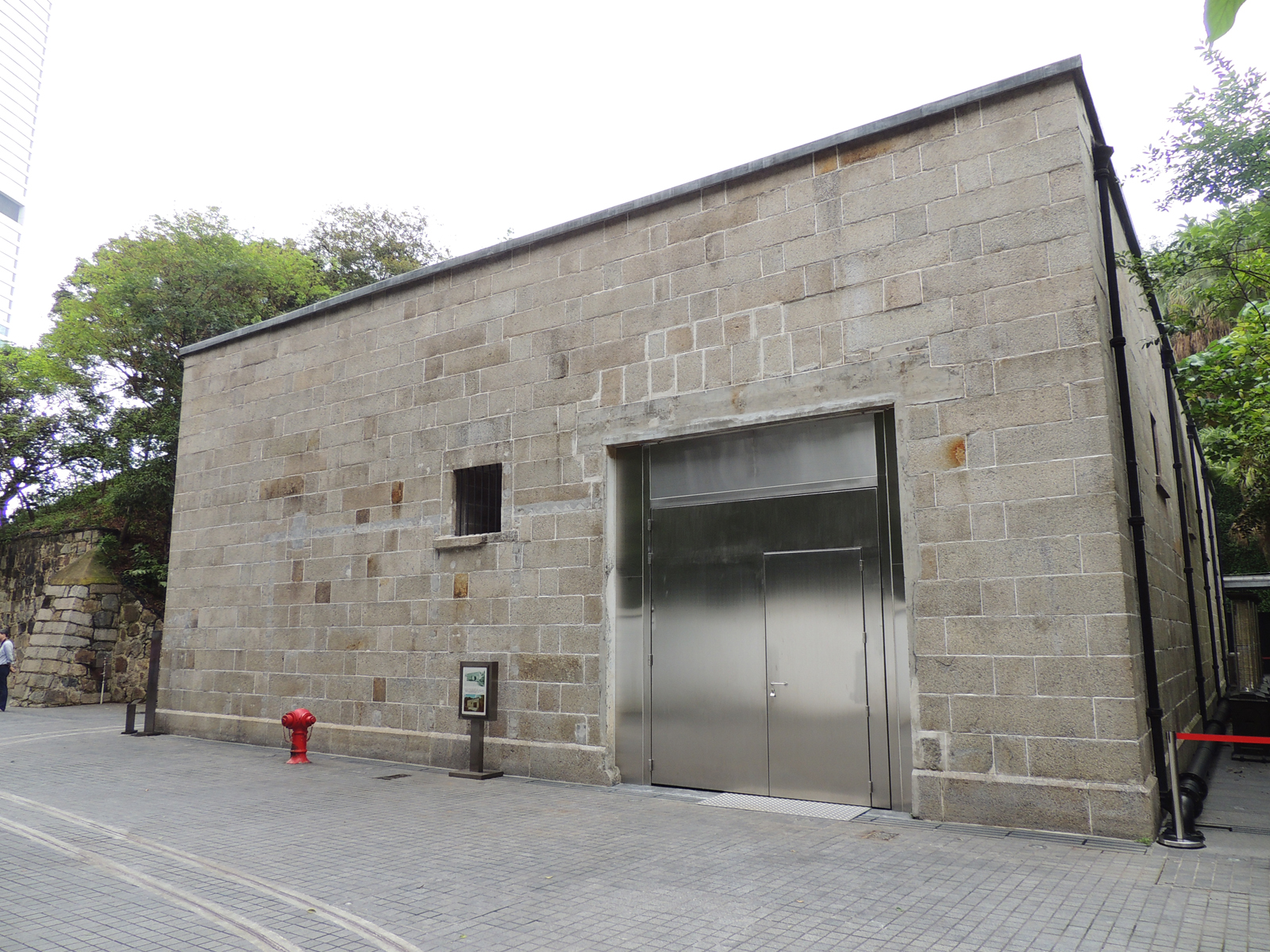
Magazine A of the Former Explosive Magazine of the Old Victoria Barracks in Admiralty, Hong Kong

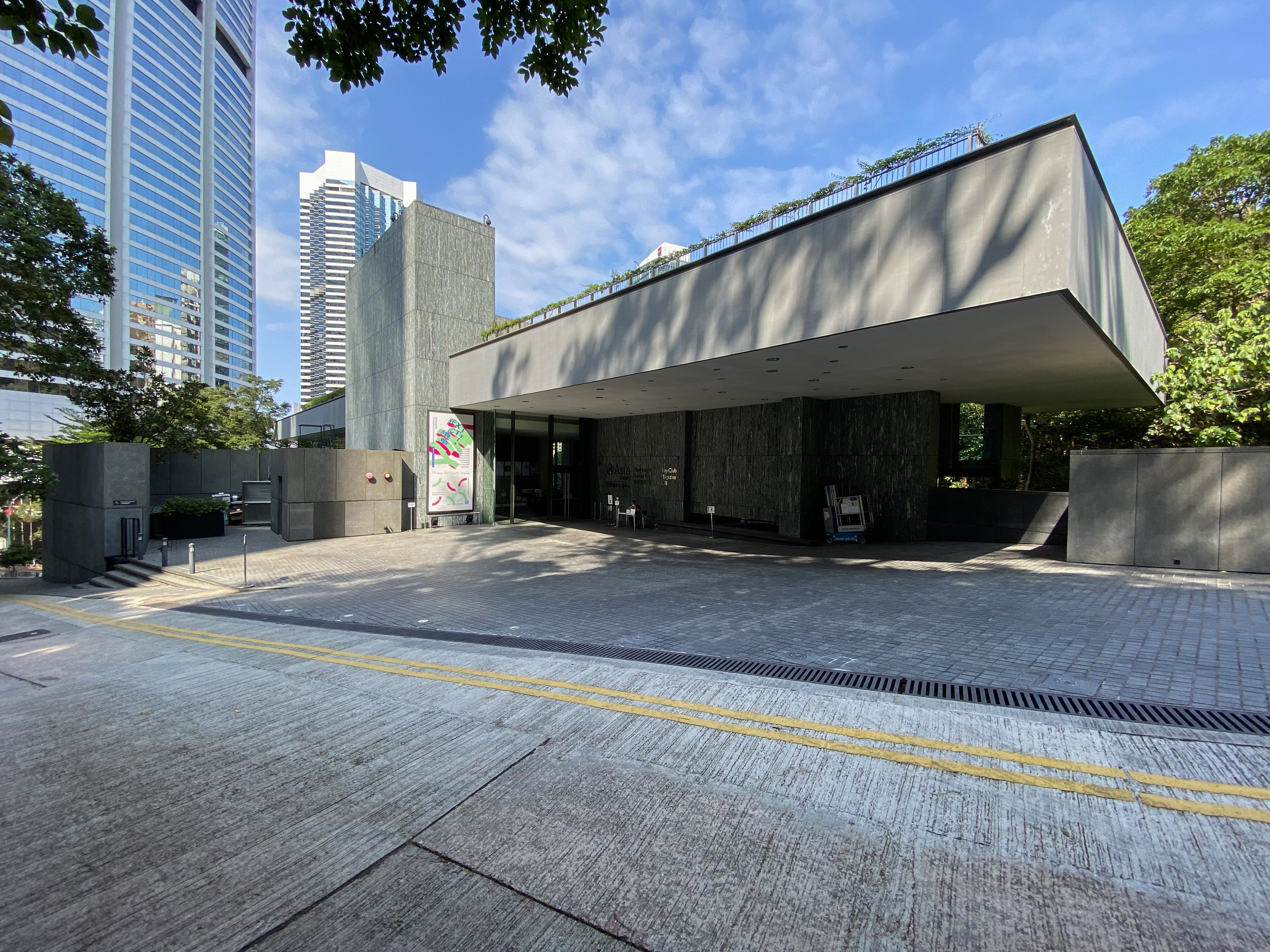
Centre entrance along Justice Drive

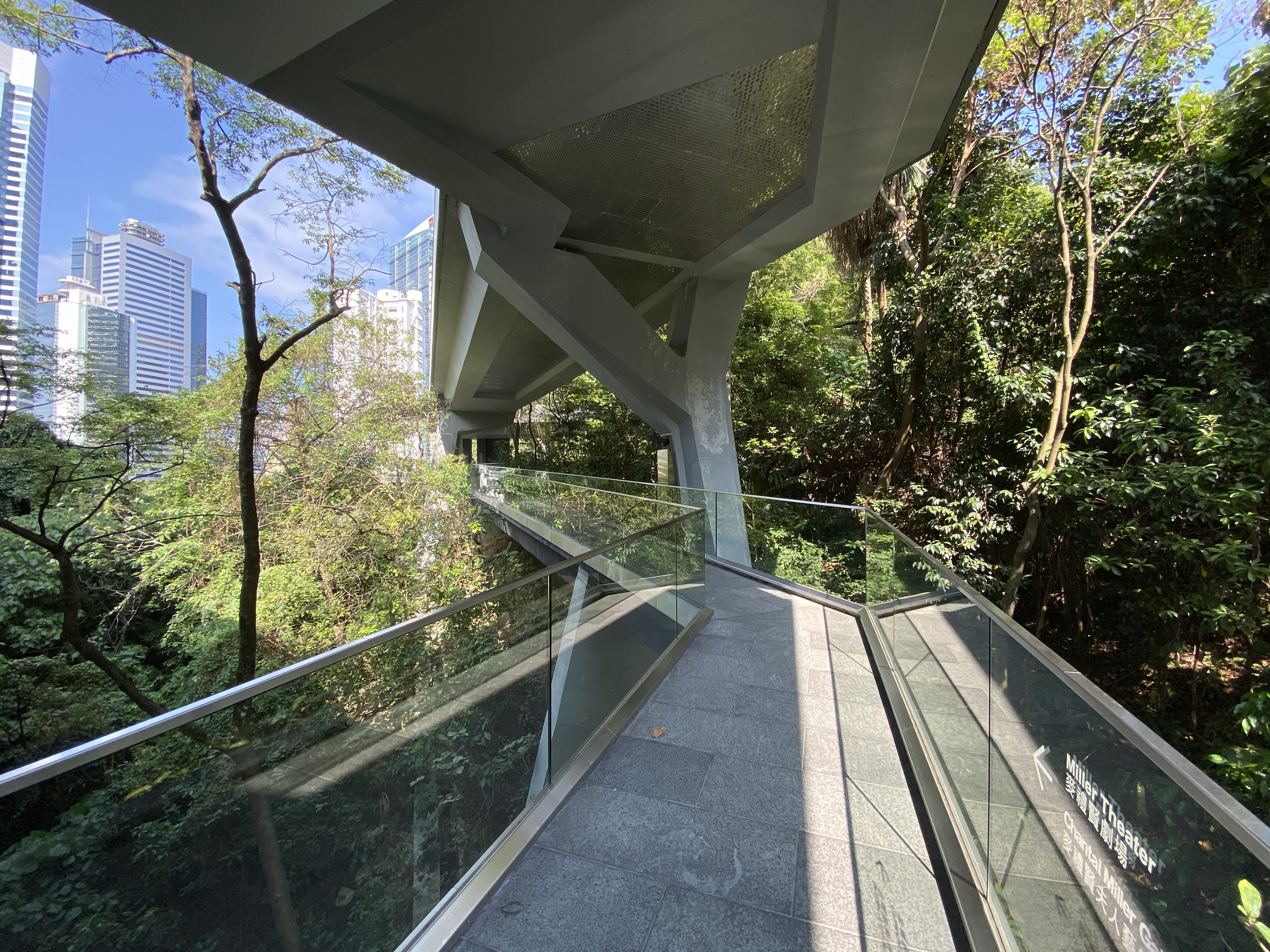
Modern footbridge within the compound

The Asia Society Hong Kong Centre is one of the global centers of the New York City–based Asia Society. Asia Society started its journey in Hong Kong in 1990, with the mission to navigate shared futures for Asia and the world in the fields of arts and culture, business and policy. They moved to their current site in Admiralty, in the business district of Hong Kong, on February 9, 2012.

The centre is situated on the site of a former British military explosives magazine and includes several restored military buildings The project was designed by architects Tod Williams and Billie Tsien.

== Former explosives magazine ==
The Former Explosives Magazine (Chinese: 舊域多利軍營軍火庫) was built between 1843 and 1874 and served as a storehouse of explosives for the British Army of the Victoria Barracks. The buildings of the complex were separated by earth mounds, known as traverses, which were built as buffers in case of explosions.

The historic buildings, which include the former Magazine A, Magazine B and the Laboratory are collectively listed as a Grade I historic building, while the former Block GG is listed as a Grade II historic building.

== Chantal Miller Gallery ==
Every year, ASHK hosts about 200 programs, including educational programs for kids, targeted towards enhancing appreciation of arts and culture, helping them with skill-building activities, and giving them exposure to prominent personalities from around the world. ASHK's Chantal Miller Gallery, which is free for public entry, hosts three to four world-class exhibitions every year. The former Magazine A, which was built between 1863 and 1868, has been converted into a world class gallery. These exhibitions are complemented by multifaceted programs such as talks, workshops, and guided tours, which not only highlight artistic talents but also provide a creative platform for art enthusiasts to share mutual knowledge and appreciation. Some of the notable exhibitions hosted at ASHK in the past featuring Chinese art included Light Before Dawn, Xu Bing's It Begins with Metamorphosis, Bat Caves, Contemporary Chinese Woman Artist Series, and When Gold Blossoms, among others. Asia Society Hong Kong Center hosted Yoshitomo Nara: “Life is Only One” in 2015, which was received warmly by the art enthusiasts. Besides these exhibitions, ASHK also holds programs on a regular basis that create space for exchanging ideas, facilitating dialogues, and fostering the understanding and appreciation of arts, history, culture, and customs from different parts of Asia and the world.

== Site Restoration ==
Located in the heart of the central business district, Asia Society Hong Kong Center (ASHK) is situated at the Former Explosives Magazine of the Old Victoria Barracks in Hong Kong, a site steeped in history, cultural significance and natural beauty with sweeping views of the city's skyline and Victoria Harbour.

The 1.3 hectares site houses a group of four former British military buildings, originally built during the mid-19th century to the early 20th century for explosives and ammunition production and storage. The site was later abandoned in the 1980s, until it was granted to ASHK by the Hong Kong S.A.R. Government.

The site was revitalized with funds generously donated by The Hong Kong Jockey Club Charities Trust, and other local and international individuals and organizations. Through careful conservation, restoration and adaptive re-use, the site was transformed by award-winning Tod Williams Billie Tsien Architects into a cultural, artistic, and intellectual hub in 2012.

The former magazine A is among the oldest remaining military buildings from the colonial period in Hong Kong, built between 1863 and 1868. This Grade I historic building has been thoughtfully restored and adapted for use as a modern exhibition space of international museum standards, now named the Chantal Miller Gallery.

The former Magazine B, built between 1905 and 1907, another Grade I hisatoric building, has been transformed into a theater equipped with high-quality theatrical facilities with over 100 seats for talks, performances, and film screenings.

The site is open to public tours.
