= Roberto Chabet =

Filipino artist and architect (1937–2013)

Robert "Bobby" Chabet y Rodríguez
- Born: Roberto Rodriguez; March 29, 1937; Philippines
- Died: April 30, 2013 (aged 76); UERM Hospital, Santa Mesa, Manila, Philippines
- Education: Architecture
- Known for: Architecture, Fine Arts
- Movement: Avant-garde
- Awards: Artists Award (13); Republic Cultural Heritage Award 1975; Araw ng Maynila Award for the Visual Arts 1972; Centennial Honor for the Arts 1998

Roberto "Bobby" Rodríguez Chabet (March 29, 1937 - April 30, 2013) was an artist from the Philippines and widely acknowledged as the father of Philippine conceptual art.

== Career ==
Chabet studied architecture at the University of Santo Tomas where he graduated in 1961. He had his first solo exhibition at the Luz Gallery in the same year. He was the founding museum director of the Cultural Center of the Philippines and served there as curator from 1967 to 1970. He initiated the first 13 Artists Awards, giving recognition to young artists whose works 'show a recentness, a turning away from the past and familiar modes of art-making'.

He led the 1970s conceptual art group called Shop 6 and taught for over 30 years at the UP College of Fine Arts, where he espoused an art practice that gave precedence to idea over form. Since the 1970s, he has been organizing landmark exhibitions featuring works by young artists.

Chabet described his pieces as "creatures of memory" and himself as their "custodian." His works are the result of a process of unraveling of fixed notions about art and meaning. Highly allegorical, his drawings, collages, sculptures and installations question modernity. His works are meditations on space, the transitory nature of commonplace objects and the collisions that occur with their displacement.

Chabet ventured into architecture, painting, printmaking, sculpture, stage designing, teaching, photography and writing.

== Shows ==
Chabet has had six individual exhibitions at The Luz Gallery since 1961 and has been an active participant in local group shows. Represented in the collections of the National Museum, Ateneo Art Gallery, Cultural Center, and several private collections.

Galleria Duemila showed drawings from Chabet's early period in an exhibition entitled "Selected Chabet Drawings 60s-70s" at its gallery in May 2004.

== Awards ==
He was the recipient of the 1972 Republic Cultural Heritage Award, the 1972 Araw ng Maynila Award for the Visual Arts, and the 1998 Centennial Honor for the Arts.

== Death ==
Chabet died due to cardiac arrest at the UERM Hospital in Santa Mesa, Manila. He was 76.

According to relatives, Chabet was brought to the hospital on Monday because of chills and a high fever. He suffered a first heart attack at 5 p.m. on Tuesday, was revived, and died of a second attack at 7:30 p.m. the same day.

Chabet was single and had no children. He is survived by an elder sister, Carmen Mesina, and a younger sister Milagros Garcia. His remains will be brought to the Arlington Memorial Chapels in Araneta Avenue, Quezon City on May 1.
