= Marisa (given name) =

Marisa is a feminine given name. Like the given name Marissa, the name is derived from the Latin maris, meaning "of the sea". The name is also a Spanish, Portuguese or Italian contracted familiar nickname for Maria Isabel (Mary Elizabeth) or Maria Luisa (Mary Louise, 'Mary-Lou').

== People with this name ==
- Marisa Abbondanzieri (born 1956), Italian politician
- Marisa Abegg (born 1987), American retired UPSL player
- Marisa Abela (born 1996), English actress
- Marisa Acocella Marchetto (born 1962), American cartoonist
- Marisa Allasio (born 1936), Italian retired actress
- Marisa Anderson, American multi-instrumentalist and composer
- Marisa Antonio, El Salvador international footballer
- Marisa Baena (born 1977), Colombian golfer
- Marisa Barros (born 1980), Portuguese long-distance runner
- Marisa Bartoli (1942–2024), Italian actress
- Marisa Bartolomei, American cell biologist and professor
- Marisa Belli (born 1933), Italian actress
- Marisa Berenson (born 1947), American actress and model
- Marisa Boullosa (born 1961), Mexican artist
- Marisa Brunner (born 1982), Swiss retired footballer
- Marisa Buchheit, American soprano and beauty pageant titleholder
- Marisa Butler (born 1994), American beauty pageant titleholder
- Marisa Calihan, American contestant on Survivor (American TV series)
- Marisa Calin (born 1983), American-born English actress, writer, and producer
- Marisa Canales (born 1959), Mexican flute player
- Marisa Carnesky (born 1971), British live artist and showwoman
- Marisa Carrasco, Mexican psychologist and professor
- Marisa Casanueva (born 1981), Spanish long-distance runner
- Marisa Catalina Casey (born 1979), Colombian-born American photographer, graphic designer, educator, and co-author of the book Born in Our Hearts
- Marisa Chappell, American historian and associate professor
- Marisa Churchill, American contestant on Top Chef: Los Angeles
- Marisa Cleveland, South Korean-born American author, educator, executive director, and managing partner
- Marisa Cortesi (born 1970), Swiss former equestrian
- Marisa Coughlan (born 1973), American actress and writer
- Marisa Dalrymple-Philibert (born 1956), Jamaican attorney-at-law and politician
- Marisa Dal Santo (born 1987), American former professional skateboarder and clothing retailer
- Marisa Darasavath (born 1972), Laotian artist and translator
- Marisa T. Darden, American lawyer
- Marisa Davila (born 1997), American actress
- Marisa De Aniceto (born 1986), French track and field athlete
- Marisa Del Frate (1931–2015), Italian actress, singer, and television personality
- Marisa de Leza (1933–2020), Spanish film- and television actress
- Marisa de Lille (born 1966), Mexican singer and actress
- Marisa de los Santos (born 1966), American author and poet
- Marisa Demeo (born 1966), American associate judge
- Marisa Dick (born 1997), Canadian-born Trinidad and Tobago artistic gymnast
- Marisa Didio (born 1956), American former national field hockey coach
- Marisa dos Reis Nunes (born 1973), birth name of Mariza, Portuguese fado singer
- Marisa Drummond (born 1983), South African actress and director
- Marisa Emonts (born 2005), Belgian-German biathlete
- Marisa Ewers (born 1989), German former footballer
- Marisa Fernández (born 1953), Spanish mathematician and professor
- Marisa Ferreira (born 1983), Portuguese artist
- Marisa Ferretti Barth (1931–2021), Canadian politician
- Marisa Field (born 1987), Canadian volleyball player
- Marisa Franco, American Latino rights advocate and community organizer
- Marisa J. Fuentes, American writer, historian, academic, and associate professor
- Marisa Galvany (born 1936), American soprano
- Marísa García (born 2006), Spanish footballer
- Marisa Gata Mansa (1933–2003), Brazilian singer and songwriter
- Marisa Gerez (born 1976), Argentine footballer
- Marisa Glave (born 1981), Peruvian sociologist and politician
- Mariša Golob (born 1990), Slovenian powerlifter
- Marisa Gonzalez (born 1943), Spanish multimedia artist
- Marisa Hamamoto, Japanese-American professional dancer, speaker, and social entrepreneur
- Marisa Howard (born 1992), American steeplechase runner
- Marisa Jervella (born 1968), Swiss gymnast
- Marisa Jones, New Zealand curler and curling coach
- Marisa Jossa (born 1938), Italian television actress
- Marisa Joy, American contestant on American Idol (season 3)
- Marisa Kabas (born 1987), American journalist
- Marisa Kelly, American political scientist and academic administrator
- Marisa Kozlowski, American chemist and professor
- Marisa Kwiatkowski, American journalist and investigative reporter
- Marisa Lago (born 1955), American attorney
- Marisa Lankester (born 1963), Italian writer and author
- Marisa Laurito (born 1951), Italian actress, singer, and television personality
- Marisa Lavanchy (born 1990), Swiss sprinter
- Marisa Lenhardt, American member of industrial rock group Deathline International
- Marisa Letícia Lula da Silva (1950–2017), Brazilian/Italian First Lady of Brazil from 2003 to 2010
- Marisa Lino (born 1950), Italian-born American retired diplomat
- Marisa Linton, British author, historian, and professor emerita of history
- Marisa Liz (born 1982), Portuguese lead singer of pop rock band Amor Electro
- Marisa López (born 1964), Argentine retired field hockey player
- Marisa Mackle (born c. 1973), Northern Irish journalist and romance novelist
- Marisa Maresca (1923–1988), Italian showgirl, soubrette, and theater dancer
- Marisa Maria Louise Micallef, Maltese politician and ambassador
- Marisa Marquez (born 1978), American former politician
- Marisa Masullo (born 1959), Italian former sprinter
- Marisa Matarazzo, American author, academic, and assistant professor
- Marisa Matias (born 1976), Portuguese sociologist and politician
- Marisa Medina (1942–2012), Spanish singer, actress, and television presenter
- Marisa Mell (1939–1992), Austrian actress
- Marisa Merlini (1923–2008), Italian character actress
- Marisa Merz (1926–2019), Italian artist and sculptor
- Marisa Miller (born 1978), American model
- Marisa Monte (born 1967), Brazilian singer, composer, instrumentalist, and music producer
- Marisa Morán Jahn (born 1977), American multimedia artist, writer, and educator
- Marisa Mori (1900–1985), Italian painter and printmaker
- Marisa Helena Morias, Cape Verdean politician
- Marisa Moseley (born 1982), American basketball head coach
- Marisa Musu (1925–2002), Italian anti-fascist resistance fighter, journalist, and political activist
- Marisa Gabriela Núñez (born 1984), Argentine former boxer
- Marisa Olislagers (born 2000), Dutch professional footballer
- Marisa Olson (born 1977), German artist, writer, curator, critic, and former punk singer
- Marisa Orth (born 1963), Brazilian actress, singer, and TV host
- Marisa Papen (born 1992), Belgian model and naturist
- Marisa Paredes (1946–2024), Spanish actress
- Marisa Park (born 1991), Filipino international footballer
- Marisa Paterson (born 1982), Australian anthropologist, academic, and politician
- Marisa Pavan (born 1932), Italian actress
- Marisa Pedulla (born 1969), American former Olympic judoka
- Marisa Peguri (born 1976), Argentine former rower
- Marisa Pires Nogueira (born 1966), birth name of Marisa (footballer), Brazilian footballer
- Marisa Polvino, American film producer
- Marisa Porcel (1943–2018), Spanish stage-, film-, and television actress
- Marisa Prisa, Spanish drag performer
- Marisa Ramirez (born 1977), American actress
- Marisa Rezende (born 1944), Brazilian music educator and composer
- Marisa Roberto (born c. 1971), Italian-American neuroscientist and professor
- Marisa Robles (born 1937), Spanish harpist and composer
- Marisa Román (born 1982), Venezuelan actress
- Marisa Rowe (born 1963), Australian former WNBL player
- Marisa Ryan (born 1974), American actress
- Marisa Sánchez (1933–2018), Spanish chef, gourmet, and businesswoman
- Marisa Sannia (1947–2008), Italian singer
- Marisa Sartika Maladewi (born 1993), Indonesian super model
- Marisa Serrano, Brazilian politician and educator
- Marisa Scheinfeld (born 1980), American artist, photographer, and educator
- Marisa Siketa (born 1990), Australian actress, disc jockey, animal ambassador, and traffic manager
- Marisa Silver (born 1960), American author, screenwriter, and film director
- Marisa Sistach Peret (born 1952), Mexican film director
- Marisa Soares Marques (born 1993), Luxembourgish footballer
- Marisa Solinas (1939–2019), Italian actress and singer
- Marisa Sterling, Canadian candidate in the Ontario Liberal Party candidates in the 2011 Ontario provincial election
- Marisa Sweeney, American Democratic Party politician
- Marisa T. Darden, American lawyer
- Marisa Tomei (born 1964), American actress
- Marisa Uceda (born 1979), Argentine politician and former lawyer
- Marisa van der Meer (born 2002), New Zealand professional footballer
- Marisa Vernati (1920–1988), Italian actress
- Marisa Viggiano (born 1997), American NWSL player
- Marisa Volpi (1928–2015), Italian art historian and writer
- Marisa von Bülow, Brazilian political scientist, sociologist, and professor
- Marisa Warrington (born 1973), English-born Australian actress
- Marisa Wegrzyn (born 1981), American playwright
- Marisa Weiss, American oncologist
- Marisa Williamson (born 1985), American artist
- Marisa Winkelhausen (born 1988), Swiss curler
- Marisa Zanuck, American contestant on The Real Housewives of Beverly Hills
- Marisa Zuriel (born 1982), Argentine chess player

== Fictional characters ==
- Marisa Kirisame (霧雨 魔理沙), of the video game franchise Touhou Project
- Marisa, in the video game Fire Emblem: The Sacred Stones
- Marisa Clark, in the US comedy TV series K.C. Undercover, played by Veronica Dunne
- Marisa Coulter, in Philip Pullman's His Dark Materials fantasy novel trilogy
- Marisa Moreno, in Ashley Hope Pérez' novel What Can't Wait
- Marisa Sarratore, in Elena Ferrante's Neapolitan Novels
- Marisa Sierras, in the US TV soap opera The Young and the Restless, played by Sofia Pernas
- Marisa (Street Fighter), in the Street Fighter video game series, voiced by Mitsuki Saiga (Japanese) and Allegra Clark (English)
- Marisa Turner, Countess New Kiev, in David Weber's "Honor Harrington" science fiction book series
- Marisa Ventura, in the 2002 US romantic comedy film Maid in Manhattan, played by Jennifer Lopez
- Princess Marisa, in animated series Elena of Avalor special Song of the Sirenas, voiced by Gina Rodriguez

== See also ==
- Marissa (name)
