= Maresa =

Maresa may refer to:

- a synonym for the termite genus Reticulitermes
- Maresa (company), a former Spanish company of pinball machines

== See also ==
- Mareşal (disambiguation)
- Marisa (disambiguation)
