= Marissa =

Marissa can refer to:

- Maresha or Marissa, an ancient city in Israel
- Marissa, Illinois, a town in Illinois
- Marissa Township, St. Clair County, Illinois
- Marissa (name), a female given name, including a list of persons and fictional characters with the name
- Vita Marissa (born 1981), Indonesian badminton player

== See also ==
- MS Princesa Marissa, a cruise ship operated by Louis Cruise Lines
