= Papin (disambiguation) =

Papin is a surname.

Papin may also refer to:

- Papín, a village and municipality, Slovakia
- Papin, Missouri
- Papin Dam by Papin village, Pakistan
- French submarine Papin
