= Brown Middle School =

Brown Middle School may refer to the following schools:

- Brown Middle School in the El Paso Independent School District in Texas
- Herman J.Russell West End Academy, formerly known as Joseph Emerson Brown Middle School, in the Atlanta Public Schools in Georgia
- R. A. Brown Middle School in the Hillsboro School District in Oregon
- Charles E. Brown Middle School in the Newton Public Schools School District in Massachusetts
