= Maruzzo =

Maruzzo (pronounced [maˈruttso]) is an Italian surname from Vicenza, probably from an old settlement of the area. Notable people with the name include:

- Joe Maruzzo, American actor
- Marcello Maruzzo (1929–1981), Italian Roman Catholic priest and missionary

== See also ==
- Mariuzzo
- Maruzzella (disambiguation)
- Mahindra Marazzo
