= Newton South High School =

Public school in Newton, Massachusetts, US

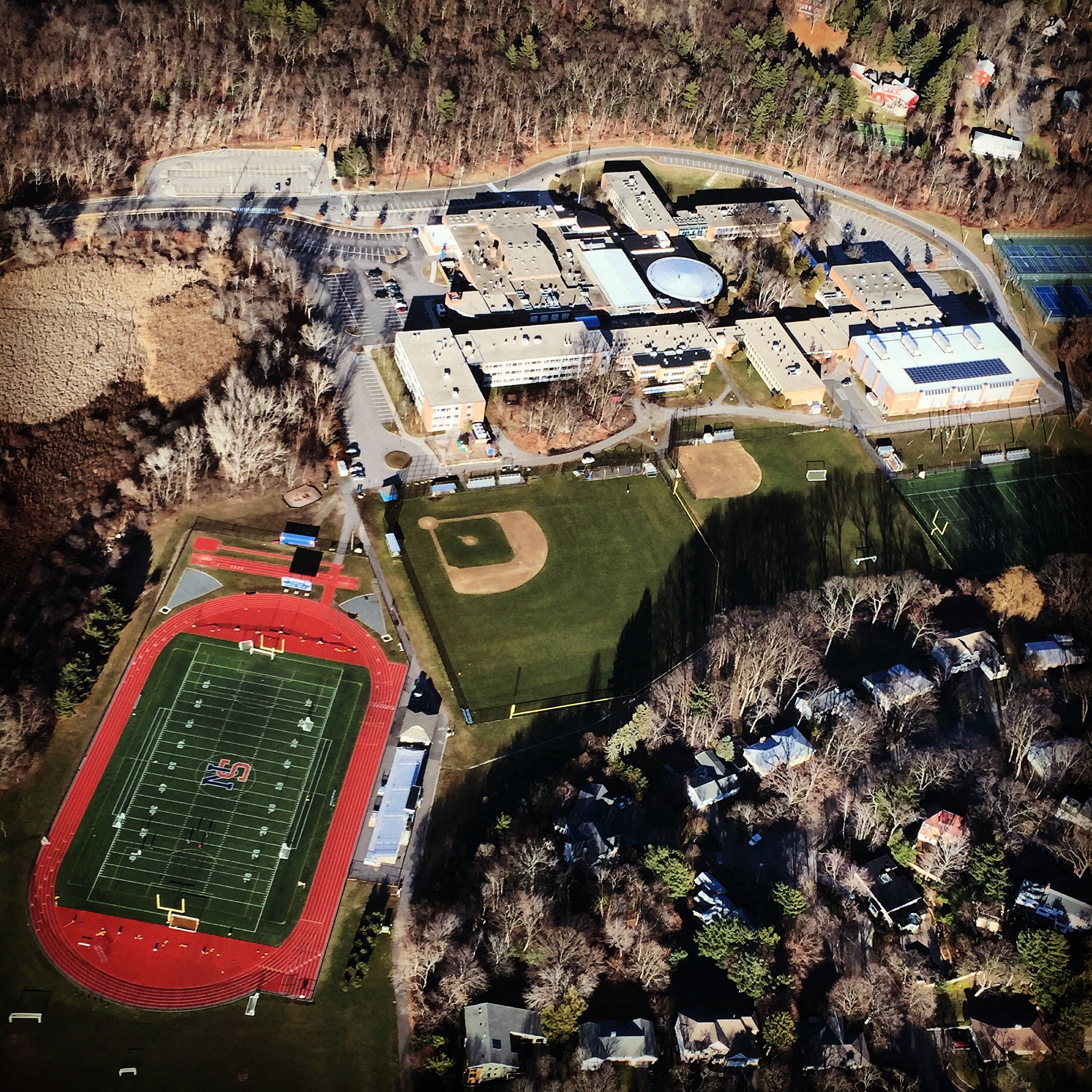

Location
- 140 Brandeis Road; Newton, Massachusetts 02459; United States; 42°18′51.73″N 71°11′11.36″W

Information
- Motto: Bona mens omnibus patet (A good mind is open to all things)
- Established: 1960; 66 years ago
- School district: Newton Public Schools
- CEEB code: 221548
- Principal: Caitlin Brown (Interim Principal)
- Teaching staff: 150.70 (FTE)
- Grades: 9–12
- Enrollment: 1,865 (2025-2026)
- Student to teacher ratio: 12.35
- Campus size: 33.477 acres (13.548 ha)
- Colors: Blue; Orange
- Mascot: Lion
- Newspaper: The Lion's Roar, Denebola
- Yearbook: Regulus
- Website: nshs.newton.k12.ma.us
- Last updated: May 11, 2019; 7 years ago

Newton South High School is one of two public high schools in the city of Newton, Massachusetts, United States, the other being Newton North.

== History and student life ==
By the late 1950s, Newton's sole public high school, Newton High, grew to 3,000 students. Newton built a new school, Newton South, in the Oak Hill neighborhood in 1960. Two of Newton's Middle Schools, Charles E. Brown and Oak Hill Middle school, feed into Newton South. The school is organized into four student houses—Cutler, Goldrick, Goodwin, and Wheeler—each with a student commons.

Newton South was the first public high school to create a gay–straight alliance in the United States in the early 1990s.

Newton South features two award-winning student newspapers, Denebola and The Lion's Roar.

U.S. News & World Report ranked Newton South as the 446th-best high school in the country and 20th-best in the Massachusetts in its 2020 rankings.

The school is part of the Newton Public School District.

=== Public attention ===
The school gained notoriety in 2002 for its "Senior Scavenger Hunt", a student-organized contest that featured theft, vandalism, illegal drug use, and various sexual acts committed by the graduating seniors in exchange for points.

On February 8, 2007, the Newton South STAND: A Student Anti-Genocide Coalition chapter organized a Darfur Benefit Concert with the well known band, State Radio, raising over $230,000 for Save the Children and the Genocide Intervention Network.

In September 2013, the school's powderpuff football tradition was canceled due to hazing, injuries and sexism. Students protested the decision.

== Sports ==
Newton South competes in the DCL (Dual County League).

- Fall sports
  - Football (B)
  - Soccer (B+G)
  - Cross Country (B+G)
  - Volleyball (G)
  - Golf (Co-Ed)
  - Field Hockey (Co-Ed)
  - Cheerleading (Co-Ed)
- Winter sports
  - Basketball (B+G)
  - Gymnastics (B+G)
  - Nordic Skiing (B+G)
  - Alpine Skiing (B+G)
  - Indoor Track and Field (B+G)
  - Wrestling (Co-Ed)
  - Hockey (B+G)
  - Swimming and Diving (B+G)
  - Cheerleading (Co-Ed)
- Spring sports
  - Lacrosse (B+G)
  - Baseball (B)
  - Softball (G)
  - Volleyball (B)
  - Track and Field (B+G)
  - Tennis (B+G)
  - Ultimate Frisbee (B)

=== Awards and recognition ===
Newton South was named America's top athletic program by Sports Illustrated in 2010.

== Notable alumni ==
- Josh Altman, class of 1997, real estate agent on Million Dollar Listing Los Angeles
- Nili Brosh, Israeli-American guitarist and songwriter
- Veronica Burton, class of 2018, professional basketball player for the Golden State Valkyries of the Women's National Basketball Association
- Marisa Catalina Casey, class of 1997, co-author of Born in Our Hearts: Stories of Adoption, is the founder and executive director of the arts education nonprofit Starting Artists, Inc. located in Brooklyn
- Geoffrey Gray, class of 2015, American-Israeli professional basketball player in the Israeli Basketball Premier League
- Marin Hinkle, class of 1984, actor for Amazon's The Marvelous Mrs. Maisel and CBS's Two and a Half Men
- Darvell Huffman, class of 1986, former NFL player for the Indianapolis Colts
- Alex Karpovsky, class of 1993, actor for HBO's comedy-drama Girls and Amazon's Homecoming
- Caroline Kaufer, class of 1980, software executive and philanthropist
- John Krasinski, class of 1997, filmmaker and actor for NBC's comedy The Office, A Quiet Place, and A Quiet Place Part II
- Ben Kurland, class of 2002, an actor in The Artist, which won five Academy Awards
- Bill Lichtenstein, class of 1974, Peabody Award-winning journalist, filmmaker, radio producer
- Robert C. Lieberman, class of 1982, American political journalist and former provost of the Johns Hopkins University
- Jonathan Mann, class of 1965, World Health Organization chief against AIDS
- Chris Morocco, class of 1998, American chef and YouTube personality
- Dan Moren, class of 1998, science-fiction writer, author of the Galactic Cold War series
- Roger Myerson, class of 1969, was one of the three recipients of the Nobel Prize in Economics in 2007 "for having laid the foundations of mechanism design theory"
- Hari Nef, class of 2011, transgender actress, model, and writer. Debuted at New York Fashion Week Spring 2015
- B. J. Novak, class of 1997, co-executive producer, writer, and actor for NBC's comedy The Office
- Eli Roth, class of 1990, film director, producer, writer, and actor. Co-starred with Novak in Inglourious Basterds
- Jason Solowsky, class of 1995, composer, pianist, and guitarist. Composed music for over 100 films
- Kenneth Stanley, class of 1993, computer scientist and artificial intelligence researcher. Creator of the NEAT algorithm and co-creator of Picbreeder.
- Bronze Age Pervert, class of 1998, author of Bronze Age Mindset
- Plane Jane, class of 2016, drag queen who placed third on RuPaul's Drag Race season 16
- Tema Siegel, class of 2017, lead vocalist of Couch
- Joe Rogan, class of 1985, podcaster, UFC commentator, comedian, actor, and former television host
