= Darvell Huffman =

American football player (born 1967)

No. 85
- Position: Wide receiver

Personal information
- Born: May 5, 1967 (age 59); Boston, Massachusetts, U.S.
- Listed height: 5 ft 8 in (1.73 m)
- Listed weight: 158 lb (72 kg)

Career information
- High school: Newton South (Newton, Massachusetts)
- College: Boston University
- NFL draft: 1990: 9th round, 232nd overall pick

Career history
- Indianapolis Colts (1990–1991); Charlotte Rage (1994)

Career NFL statistics
- Receptions: 3
- Receiving yards: 14
- Stats at Pro Football Reference
- Stats at ArenaFan.com

Darvell Huffman (born May 5, 1967) is an American former professional football player who was a wide receiver in the National Football League (NFL) for the Indianapolis Colts. He played college football for the Boston University Terriers and was selected in the ninth round of the 1990 NFL draft.

== Playing career ==
=== College ===
Prior to attending Boston he attended Newton South High School in Massachusetts where he was a stand out in football. He was a walk on at Boston University. Huffman was AP Honorable Mention All American at Boston University

=== Professional ===
Huffman played for the Indianapolis Colts, Canadian Football League and the Charlotte Rage of the Arena Football League.

== Coaching career and other work ==
Huffman turned to coaching high school football at Cathedral High School in Indianapolis and Noblesville High School in Noblesville, Indiana. Huffman coached for 13 years.

National Football League Alumni Indianapolis Chapter Secretary since 2002. January 23, 2014 the Indianapolis Chapter donated $35,000 I U Health Neuroscience.
