= Sopheap Pich =

American sculptor

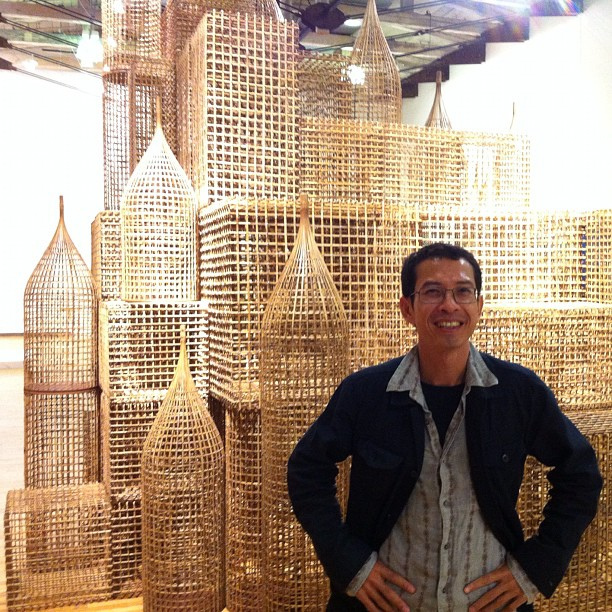
- Sopheap Pich in front of one of his sculptures at the Massachusetts Museum of Contemporary Art
- Born: 1971 (age 54–55); Battambang, Khmer Republic (now Cambodia)
- Education: School of the Art Institute of Chicago, University of Massachusetts Amherst
- Movement: Modern
- Website: http://sopheap-pich.com/

Sopheap Pich (Khmer: ពេជ្យ សុភាព; born 1971) is a Cambodian American contemporary artist. His sculptures utilize traditional Cambodian materials, which reflect the history of the nation and the artist's relation to his identity.

== Early work and influences ==
Sopheap Pich was born in Battambang, Cambodia (then known as the Khmer Republic) in 1971. He grew up and survived the Khmer Rouge while a child in Cambodia, in 1984 he moved at age 13 to the United States of America. In 7th grade in the U.S., he enrolled into a school with a classroom setting and a teacher for the first time. He continued with his education at the University of Massachusetts Amherst, and in 2002 got his MFA at School of the Art Institute of Chicago.

In 2002, he returned to Cambodia, to the same place he had evacuated from in formative years as a result of the murderous communist regime, the Khmer Rouge, killed over 2.5 million people in the span of less than four years. Pich's trip back home renewed and reunited him with his cultural identity, which impacts his artwork. He uses local material mostly found in Cambodia, for example, bamboo. Pich creates a wide range of different of works from sculptures to paints. His sculptures are usually quite large, and some are high enough to touch the top of an art gallery's ceiling. Many of his first creations were destroyed and recycled because there was no place to store them. He has many of the only rare photographs of this first works. One early painting from 1995, titled 'Conch's Flight' was done on two canvases. It is preserved and is in a private collection.

== Style and materials ==
Sopheap Pich uses very specific materials in his work, related to his native Cambodia. His installation The Room consisted of bamboo sticks and dye. Other materials include:

- Rattan
- Resin
- Plywood
- Bamboo
- Metal
- Wire
- Dye
- Glue

Pich's style aims to be non-autobiographical, but he embraces the materials from his native country to depict its past. Trained as a painter, Pich later experimented with sculpting, and manipulating materials. He realized that sculpture was a way to be physically intimate with his environment. He manipulates his materials through boiling, cutting, bending, burning and dying. He lets the materials mostly speak for themselves, with no hidden narrative. His pieces are very environmental, and inexpensive looking. They are meant to look as though the time put in was worth more than the monetary value of the materials themselves.

Pich works with many mediums, he not only works with weaving, but also in sculpture and print.

== Major works ==
=== Reliefs (2013) ===
Reliefs was Pich's third solo exhibition at the Tyler Rollins Fine Arts Gallery, and featured over ten different sculptural works. His reliefs represents how the artist explores the grid. Reliefs are made of rattan grids and covered with strips of burlap that were originally used from rice bags. The bags had already been repaired with string and twine. All of the works in the series are used with just two colors: mainly black and a little red. The red is made from powdered clay and the black is made from charcoal. These materials relate to Pich's work because they came from Cambodia, and he uses each material as a story that is a part of his culture. The grids, burlap, and strings are all exhibits of the detailed and perfected parts of Pich's work that he wanted to be noticed. He wanted to show a sense of fine execution in his craftmanship.

=== Morning Glory (2011) ===
Morning Glory, a 17.5-foot long sculpture, was first exhibited in 2011 at the Tyler Rollins Fine Arts gallery as part of Sopheap Pich's second solo show. Like many of his works, the sculpture is made of rattan and bamboo, materials that are specific to Southeast Asia, although it also includes plywood, wire and steel bolts. Pich's memories of the Khmer Rouge period are reflected in this piece. The morning glory, a common flower, was a main source of food in Cambodia during the dictatorship that ran from 1975 to 1979. In addition to mass murders, the Khmer Rouge rule led to famine, so the plant had a particular importance in people's survival. Its tentacular stems and buds are intertwined, and at the end opens in a wide flower. Its frail appearance and beauty contrasts with the atrocities that Cambodian people have experienced.

=== A Room (2014) ===
A commission from the Indianapolis Museum of Art, A Room is a 40-feet long installation made of 1,200 bamboo strips. It was installed in the fall of 2014 in the museum's atrium. Pich wanted the installation to have an effect on the visitors, "in an emotional kind of way", so the installation is an immersive experience for the visitors, who can touch it and interact with it. Following the pattern of his works, the piece is inspired from Cambodia, and particularly the big temples that convey a sense of calm, and are real pieces of art. Bamboo is a natural material widely available in Cambodia. The absence of shops dedicated to art led Sopheap Pich to look into what was naturally present in the environment, but also to use more available supplies like common house paint and glue.

== See also ==
Cambodian art

== Exhibitions ==
Solo exhibitions

- 1997 – Empty Wooden Cigarette Boxes From Cambodia, The Augusta Savage Gallery, Amherst, MA
- 2002 – Recent Works, The Brewery Studio, Boston, MA
- 2003 – Excavating the Vessels, Java Café and Gallery, Phnom Penh, Cambodia
- 2004 – Pdao, French Cultural Center Phnom Penh, Cambodia
- 2005 – Chomlak, sculptures and drawings, The Arts Lounge of Hotel de la Paix, Siem Reap, Cambodia
- 2005 – Sculptures and Drawings, Amansara Resort, Siem Reap, Cambodia
- 2006 – Moha Saen Anett, Gallery Dong Xi, Vestfossen, Norway
- 2007 – Recent Works From Kunming, TCG/Nordica, Kunming, China
- 2007 – Tidal, H Gallery, Bangkok, Thailand
- 2007 – Flow, Sala Artspace, Phnom Penh, Cambodia
- 2008 – Strands, The Esplanade, Singapore
- 2009 – The Pulse Within, Tyler Rollins Fine Art, New York, NY
- 2010 – Fragile, French Cultural Center, Phnom Penh, Cambodia
- 2011 – Morning Glory, Tyler Rollins Fine Art, New York, NY
- 2011 – Compound, The Henry Art Gallery, University of Washington, Seattle, WA
- 2012 – In Spite of Order, H Gallery, Bangkok, Thailand
- 2013 – Cambodian Rattan: The Sculptures of Sopheap Pich, Metropolitan Museum of Art, New York, NY
- 2013 – Compound, Brookfiled Place Winter Garden, New York, NY
- 2013 – Reliefs, Tyler Rollins Fine Art, New York, NY
- 2013 – Collection+ Sopheap Pich, Sherman Contemporary Art Foundation, Sydney, Australia
- 2014 – Sopheap Pich: A Room, Indianapolis Museum of Art, Indianapolis, IN
- 2015 – Structures, Tyler Rollins Fine Art, New York, NY

Group exhibitions

- 1995 – Recent Paintings, Gallery Del Sol, Miami, FL
- 1995 – BFA Thesis Show, The Augusta Savage Gallery, University of Massachusetts, Amherst, MA
- 1998 – Presidential Dinner Exhibition, The Art Institute of Chicago, Chicago, IL
- 1999 – Altered Object, Hyde Park Arts Center, Chicago, IL
- 1999 – Young Talents II, Contemporary Arts Workshop, Chicago, IL
- 1999 – MFA Thesis Exhibition, G2, The School of the Art Institute of Chicago, Chicago, IL
- 1999 – Yellow/Face, Gallery Pilson East, Chicago, IL
- 1999 – Cows on Parade, a collaborative project with J. Zakin and S. Biggers for The Chicago Park District, exhibited at the Field Museum Campus, Chicago, IL
- 2000 – Just Good Art 2000, Hyde Park Arts Center, Chicago, IL
- 2000 – Memory: Personal and Social Testimonies, the Augusta Savage Gallery, University of Massachusetts, Amherst, MA
- 2001 – Subject Picture, The Optimistic, Chicago, IL
- 2004 – Guide, French Cultural Center Siem Reap, Cambodia
- 2004 – Continuity, Shinta Mani, Siem Reap, Cambodia
- 2004 – Guide, French Cultural Center, Phnom Penh, Cambodia
- 2004 – Meik Sratum, Silapak Khmer Amatak, Phnom Penh, Cambodia
- 2005 – Visual Arts Open, Elsewhere and New Art Gallery, Phnom Penh, Cambodia
- 2005 – Transit, with Michèle Vanvlasselaer, Java Café & Gallery, Phnom Penh, Cambodia
- 2005 – Première Vue, Passage de Retz, Paris, France
- 2005 – Je/Jeu, French Cultural Center, Yangon, Myanmar
- 2006 – Paint Around the Dog, with Jack Bauer, Lake Studio, Phnom Penh, Cambodia
- 2006 – 2+3+4 Cambodian/Vietnamese Exchange, Java Cafe and Gallery, Phnom Penh, Cambodia
- 2008 – Sh Contemporary: Best of Discovery, Shanghai, China
- 2008 – Strategies from Within, Ke Center for the Contemporary Arts, Shanghai, China
- 2008 – The Mekong Project, Thailand, Cambodia, Vietnam, Laos
- 2008 – The Drawing Room, Rubies, Phnom Penh, Cambodia
- 2009 – Asia-Pacific Triennial of Contemporary Art, Queensland Art Gallery | Gallery of Modern Art, Brisbane, Australia
- 2009 – Fukuoka Asian Art Triennale, Fukoka Asian Art Museum, Fukuoka, Japan
- 2009 – Truly Truthful, Art Asia, Miami, FL
- 2009 – Forever Until Now: Contemporary Art from Cambodia, 10 Chancery Lane Gallery, Hong Kong
- 2010 – Classic Contemporary: Contemporary Southeast Asian Art from the Singapore Art Museum Collection, Singapore Art Museum, Singapore
- 2011 – Asian Art Biennial, Taiwan
- 2011 – Singapore Biennale, Singapore
- 2011 – Here / Not Here: Buddha Presence in Eight Recent Works, Asian Art Museum of San Francisco, San Francisco, CA
- 2012 – documenta(13), Kassel, Germany
- 2012 – Invisible Cities, MASS MoCA, North Adams, MA
- 2012 – Encounter: The Royal Academy in Asia, Asia Institute of Contemporary Art, Lasalle College of the Arts, Singapore
- 2012 – DEEP S.E.A., Primo Marella, Rome, Italy
- 2013 – Moscow Biennale, Moscow, Russia
- 2013 – Dojima River Bienniale, Dojima River Forum, Osaka, Japan
- 2013 – Collecting Art of Asia, Smith College Museum of Art, Northampton, MA
- 2013 – Connect: Phnom Penh: Rescue Archaeology – Contemporary Art and Urban Development in Cambodia, IFA-Galerie, Berlin, Germany
- 2013 – Collection +, The Sherman Contemporary Art Foundation, Sydney, Australia
- 2013 – Gentle Matter, Richard Koh Fine Art, Singapore
- 2014 – The Art of Our Time: Masterpieces from the Guggenheim Collections, Guggenheim Museum Bilbao, Bilbao, Spain
- 2014 – No Country: Contemporary Art for South and Southeast Asia, Centre for Contemporary Art, Singapore
- 2014 – Medium at Large, Singapore Art Museum, Singapore
- 2014 – Re: Collection, Museum of Arts and Design, New York, NY
- 2014 – TRANSMISSION, Jim Thompson Art Center, Bangkok, Thailand
- 2015 – Drawn from Nature, Asia Society Texas Center, Houston, TX
- 2015 – Renaissance, Lille3000, Lille, France
- 2015 – First Look: Collecting Contemporary at the Asian, The Asian Art Museum, San Francisco, CA
- 2015 – "I Want Justice," United States Holocaust Memorial Museum, Washington, DC
- 2015 – Selected works on exhibition, Minneapolis Institute of Art, Minneapolis, MN
- 2016 – For the Love of Things: Still Life, Albright-Knox Art Gallery, Buffalo, NY (February 27 – May 29)
- 2017 – Viva Arte Viva, 57th Venice Biennale, Venice, Italy (May 13 - November 26)

Residency programs

- 2016 – Headlands Center for the Arts, Sausalito, CA (March – April)

Public collections

- M+ Museum of Visual Culture, Hong Kong
- Metropolitan Museum of Art, New York, NY
- Solomon R. Guggenheim Museum, New York, NY
- Centre Georges Pompidou, Paris, France
- Museum of Arts and Design, New York
- Smith College Museum of Art, Northampton, MA
- Singapore Art Museum, Singapore
- Queensland Art Gallery, Brisbane, Australia
- Bill & Melinda Gates Foundation, Seattle, WA
- Sherman Contemporary Art Foundation, Sydney, Australia
- Albright-Knox Art Gallery, Buffalo, NY
- San Francisco Museum of Modern Art, San Francisco, CA
- United States Holocaust Memorial Museum, Washington, DC
- The Asian Art Museum, San Francisco, CA
