= Papin =

Papin is a French and Russian surname, of different etymologies. Notable people with the surname include:

== French origin ==
- Christine Papin (1905–1937), French murderer
- Denis Papin (1647–1713), French physicist, mathematician and inventor
- Imelda Papin (born 1956), Filipino singer and politician
- Jeannette Papin (1761–1835), German painter
- Jean-Pierre Papin (born 1963), French former football player
- Joseph Papin (1825–1862), lawyer and political figure in Canada East
- Lea Papin (1911–1982), French murderer
- Line Papin (born 1995), French novelist
- Serge Papin (born 1955), French businessman
- Steve Papin (born 1972), American football player
- Theophile Papin (ca. 1858-1916), American, known as the "squire of debutantes"

== Russian origin ==
In Russian language, the Russian surnameis ru:Папин; the French surname is ru:Папен.

- Alexei Papin
- Pavel Papin
- Vasily Papin

== See also ==
- Papen (surname)
- Pappin
- Papain, proteolytic enzyme from papaya
