= Papen (surname) =

Papen (von Papen) is a German surname of the noble Papen family from Westphalia. Notable people with the surname include:

- August Wilhelm Papen (1799–1858), German military engineer, geodesist and cartographer
- Franz von Papen (1879–1969), German Chancellor
- Friedrich Franz von Papen a.k.a. Franz von Papen Jr. (1911–1983), German lawyer and businessman
- Heinrich Papen (1644/1645–1719), Baroque woodcarver
- Helmut von Papen (born 1940), German science and medicine journalist
- Marisa Papen, Belgian model and naturist
- Mary Kay Papen, American politician
