= Geoffrey Gray (basketball) =

American-Israeli basketball player

Geoffrey Gray ג'פרי גריי
Ironi Kiryat Ata
- Position: Point guard
- League: Israeli Basketball Premier League

Personal information
- Born: May 5, 1997 (age 29) Boston, Massachusetts
- Listed height: 6 ft 2 in (1.88 m)
- Listed weight: 200 lb (91 kg)

Career information
- High school: Newton South High School
- College: Emerson College

Geoffrey Gray (ג'פרי גריי; born May 15, 1997) is an American professional basketball player for Ironi Kiryat Ata in the Israeli Basketball Premier League, who plays the position of point guard.

== Personal life ==
Gray was born in Boston, Massachusetts, his hometown is Newton, Massachusetts, and he is Jewish. His parents are Howard Gray and Susan Phillips-Gray. He is 6 ft 2 in (1.88 m) tall.

== Basketball career ==
Gray attended Newton South High School, graduating in 2015.

He then attended Emerson College (Class of 2019), majoring in Marketing Communications, and playing for the Lions. In 2016–17 in Gray's sophomore year he averaged 18.0 points per game, and was ranked within the top 10 of seven New England Women's and Men's Athletic Conference categories: rebounds per game (3rd; 8.2), points per game (3rd), points (4th), free throw percentage (4th), assists (5th), assists per game (6th; 3.4), and field goal percentage (7th). He was named NEWMAC Men's Basketball Second Team All-Conference, and to NEWMAC Men's Basketball Academic All-Conference team. In 2017–18, he averaged 21.1 points per game, and in 2018–19 he averaged 20.4 points per game.

He played for Hapoel Eilat of the Israeli Basketball Premier League from 2019 to 2020.

Gray plays for Ironi Kiryat Ata in the Israeli Basketball Premier League, having joined in 2020.
