= Maruzzella =

Maruzzella is the diminutive of the Neapolitan word maruzza ('sea snail'), also used as a pet form of the feminine given name Marisa. It may refer to:

- "Maruzzella" (song), a Neapolitan song written and originally performed by Renato Carosone
- Maruzzella, the original title of the 1956 Italian film Mermaid of Naples
