= Marisa =

Marisa may refer to:

- Marisa, Indonesia, a town in Gorontalo Province, Indonesia
- Marisa, Hellenised name of Maresha, town in Idumea (today in Israel)
- Marisa (given name), a feminine personal name
- Marisa (gastropod), a genus of apple snails
- MV Marisa (1937), a Dutch ship torpedoed in 1941; see List of shipwrecks in May 1941
- Marisa, a Sudanese form of millet beer
- Marisa Kirisame, a fictional character from the Touhou Project franchise
