= Erika Tan =

Singaporean contemporary artist, curator, and educator

- 陈丽可
- Born: 1967 (age 58–59); Singapore
- Education: BA (King's College, Cambridge); BA (Beijing Film Academy); MFA (Central Saint Martins School of Art)
- Known for: Installation art, video art, film
- Movement: Contemporary art
- Awards: 2012: Samsung Digital Art Plus Prize Nominee; 2001–5: ACME Fire Station Residency; 1998: Arts Foundation Digital Arts Fellowship
- Website: https://www.erikatan.net/

Erika Tan (Chinese: 陈丽可; pinyin: Chén Líkě; born 1967) is a London-based Singaporean contemporary artist and curator whose research-led practice emerges from her interests in anthropology and the moving image. Her recent research examines the postcolonial and transnational, working with archival artefacts, exhibition histories, received narratives, contested heritage, subjugated voices, and the movement of ideas, people and objects. She is a lecturer at the Central Saint Martins, University of the Arts London.

Tan's work has been exhibited internationally, including Cities on the Move at the Hayward Gallery, London in 1999, the 2006 Singapore Biennale, Thermocline of Art: New Asian Waves at the ZKM Center for Art and Media, Karlsruhe in 2007, and Persistent Visions at NUS Museum, Singapore, and Vargas Museum, Philippines from 2009 to 2010.

More recently, she has participated in exhibitions such as the Artist and Empire exhibition by Tate and National Gallery Singapore from 2016 to 2017, the Diaspora Pavilion at the Venice Biennale 2017, and As the West Slept at the World Trade Center, New York in 2019.

== Education and personal life ==
Tan studied Social Anthropology and Archaeology at King's College, Cambridge, and Film Directing at the Beijing Film Academy. This was followed by an Advanced Diploma in Film & Video and a Master in Fine Art at the Central Saint Martins School of Art, London. She is currently based in London.

== Career ==
In 2014, Tan had a solo exhibition at NUS Museum titled Come Cannibalise Us, Why Don’t You? Emerging from an ongoing discussion between NUS Museum curators and Tan since 2009, the exhibition featured an installation re-visiting and adapting artefacts and writings from the exhibition Camping and Tramping Through The Colonial Archive: The Museum in Malaya (2011-2013) alongside newer film, sculpture, and works on paper developed by Tan. Guided by notions of aesthetic cannibalism, the installation examines the contingent rules and contexts of the colonial museum in Malaya as it came to be framed in the 19th century, alongside its continuations in the postcolonial present.

In 2015, while artist-in-residence at the NTU Centre for Contemporary Art Singapore, Tan developed Halimah-the-Empire-Exhibition-weaver-who-died-whilst-performing-her-craft. The Lab at NTU CCA was utilised as an exhibition space, a film studio and the site of a live "broadcast" debate between two competing teams. Tan's project sought to examine the history of the expert weaver, Halimah Binti Abdullah, who had travelled from Johore to London in 1924 for her skills to be exhibited at the British Empire Exhibition, only to contract pneumonia and die in London.

At the Artist and Empire: (En)countering Colonial Legacies exhibition at National Gallery Singapore from October 2016–March 2017, Tan's commissioned installation, The Weavers Lament Part I – IV was shown. Building on her research about the weaver Halimah, the installation featured digitally manipulated video, strips of textile and archival images.

In 2017, Tan's video works Apa Jika, The Mis-placed Comma (I, II, III) were developed for the digital long-term exhibition, unrealised, at National Gallery Singapore. Taking from the physical site of the gallery, Tan filmed her work before the museum had opened to the public in November 2015, with scenes set in exhibition spaces while works were still being hung. The work was then exhibited in Venice, Italy, as part of the work The "Forgotten" Weaver at the Diaspora Pavilion, a collateral event at the Venice Biennale 2017. The "Forgotten" Weaver brings together two works dealing with the weaver Halimah, including Apa Jika, The Mis-placed Comma (I, II, III) and an installation taking the form of a loom, with white threads forming a weave-like structure. In 2018, the Wolverhampton Art Gallery re-staged the Diaspora Pavilion, featuring seven of the original 19 artists, including Tan's The "Forgotten" Weaver.
