= Pappin =

Pappin is a surname, and may refer to:

- Jim Pappin (1939–2022) - retired professional ice hockey right winger
- Veryan Pappin (born 1958) - former Scottish field hockey player

Some claim that Pappin is a common surname from Pikwàkanagàn, however this information is inaccurate.

== See also ==
- Papin
- Pippin (disambiguation)
