= Osvaldo Gutierrez =

American organic chemist (born 1983)

- Born: August 10, 1983 (age 43); Rancho Los Prietos, Salamanca, Guanajuato, Mexico
- Education: University of California, Davis (PhD); University of California, Los Angeles (B.S., M.S.)
- Awards: Arthur C. Cope Scholar Award
- Scientific career
- Fields: Organic Chemistry, Catalysis, Computational Chemistry
- Workplaces: University of California, Los Angeles; Texas A & M University; University of Maryland-College Park
- Doctoral advisor: Dean J. Tantillo
- Other academic advisors: Kendall N. Houk; Marisa C. Kozlowski
- Website: www.gutierrezlabs.com

Osvaldo Gutierrez is an organic chemist, who uses computer models to analyze chemical reactions with the aim of making medicine more affordable.

== Early life and education ==
Osvaldo Gutierrez is a Mexican chemist and professor. He was born in Rancho Los Prietos, Salamanca in the state of Guanajuato. While in Mexico, Osvaldo's grandmother worked as a midwife, which inspired Osvaldo to pursue a career where he could help people too.

Due to the unstable economy in Mexico, Osvaldo and his family immigrated to the United States in 1993, when he was nine years old. The journey for Osvaldo and his family wasn't an easy one, but eventually they made it to the U.S. where they lived in the city of Sacramento, California. While in Sacramento, Osvaldo's father supported the family by working as a lawn mower and maintenance worker. Osvaldo and his family lived in a small house while facing an environment hostile for immigrants. While in high school, Osvaldo worked at various jobs, such as construction and boxing.

Gutierrez attended Sacramento City College. In 2006, Gutierrez transferred to the University of California, Los Angeles (UCLA) where he obtained both his Bachelor's (B.S.) and Master's (M.S.) degrees in chemistry in 2009. Out of 14 siblings, he was the first one to graduate from high school and college.

In 2012, Gutierrez received legal status through the Deferred Action for Childhood Arrivals (DACA) program. With the passing of the California Dream Act, Gutierrez earned his doctorate from University of California, Davis (UCD) in 2012, where he was mentored by professor Dean J. Tantillo. He started a postdoctoral fellowship at the University of Pennsylvania from 2012 to 2016.

== Career and research ==
In 2006, as an undergraduate, Gutierrez researched the use of quantum mechanical calculations to study organocatalysis.

In 2016, after Gutierrez completed his postdoctoral fellowship at the University of Pennsylvania, he became an assistant professor at the University of Maryland, College Park in the chemistry and biochemistry department. In 2021, Gutierrez was hired as an associate professor at Texas A&M University. In 2025, Gutierrez moved to UCLA.

Gutierrez uses computer modeling to help understand chemical reactions before trying traditional methods. Gutierrez's model helps to experiment with less resources and predict how the atoms and molecules will arrange themselves during the chemical reactions, giving scientists a more accurate prediction.

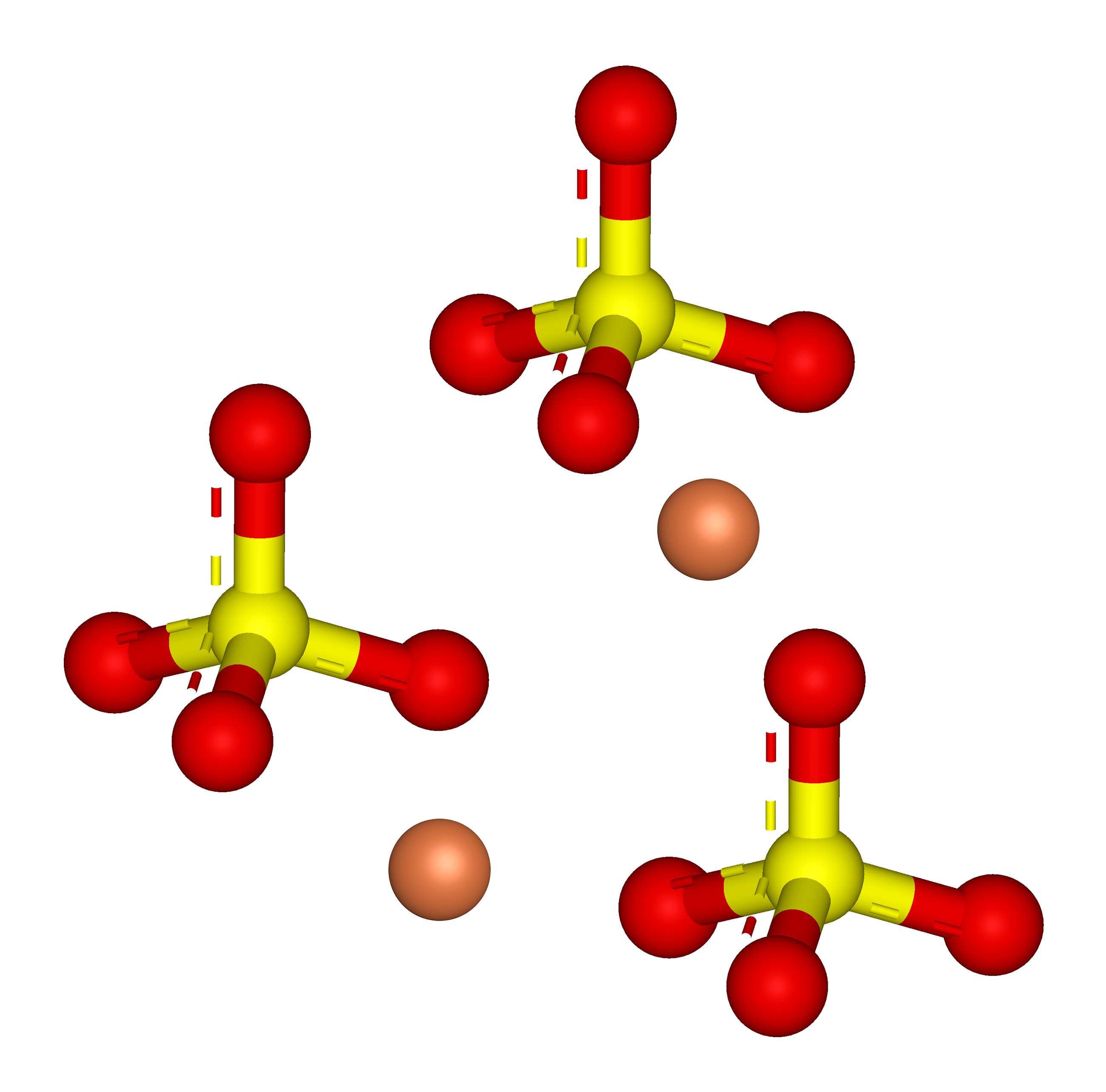
Iron(III)-sulfate-3D-balls-ionic

Gutierrez researched the use of iron (Fe) as a catalyst to a carbon to carbon bonds to produce safer and less expensive medicine, and researched how light impacts the process of making medicinal compounds. Iron is not a good element to work with because it is very reactive and has too many radicals, complex electron interactions, and oxidation states. With technology advancements, chemists were able to bypass that and catalyzed Fe cross couplings that enabled to unionize and diverse the carbon centered radicals. Before this research, chemists were mostly using an element called palladium, which is easy to work with, very expensive, and toxic; whereas, iron is more complex, but less expensive, abundant and nontoxic. Gutierrez has also researched cross couplings using nickel (Ni) catalysts.

Gutierrez works for the Alliance for Diversity in Science and Engineering (ADSE), an organization that mentors underrepresented people in STEM.

== Selected publications ==
- Tapas Maity, Ángel Rentería-Gómez, and Osvaldo Gutierrez. "Stereoselective Fe-Catalyzed Decoupled Cross-Couplings: Chiral Vinyl Oxazolidinones as Effective Radical Lynchpins for Diastereoselective C(sp2)–C(sp3) Bond Formation." ACS Catalysis. 2024 14 (17), 13049-13054, DOI: 10.1021/acscatal.4c04568.
- Macayla Guerrero, Ángel Rentería-Gómez, Deborshee Das and Osvaldo Gutierrez. "Fe-catalyzed Fluoroalkyl(hetero)arylation of Vinyl Azaarenes: Rapid and Modular Synthesis of Unsymmetrical 1,1-Bis(hetero)arylalkanes." Organic Letters. 2024 26 (33), 7015-7020, DOI: 10.1021/acs.orglett.4c02515.
- Dinabandhu Sar, Shuai Yin, Jacob Grygus, Ángel Rentería-Gómez, Melanie Garcia, and Osvaldo Gutierrez. "Expanding the chemical space of enol silyl ethers: catalytic dicarbofunctionalization enabled by iron catalysis." Chemical Science. 2023, 14, 13007-13013, DOI: 10.1039/D3SC04549H.
- Lei Liu, Maria Camila Aguilera, Wes Lee, Cassandra R. Youshaw, Michael L. Neidig, Osvaldo Gutierrez. "General method for iron-catalyzed multicomponent radical cascades–cross-couplings." Science 374, 432-439(2021), DOI:10.1126/science.abj6005
- Lei Liu; Wes Lee; Cassandra R. Youshaw; Mingbin Yuan; Michael B. Geherty; Peter Y. Zavalij; Osvaldo Gutierrez. "Fe-catalyzed three-component dicarbofunctionalization of unactivated alkenes with alkyl halides and Grignard reagents." Chemical Science. 2020,11, 8301-8305, DOI: 10.1039/D0SC02127J.

== Awards and recognition ==
Gutierrez was awarded the $1.9 million Maximizing Investigators' Research Award (MIRA) from the National Institutes of Health (NIH) from 2020 to 2024.

Gutierrez was awarded the National Science Foundation CAREER Award in 2018, and again in 2022 for his "Computational and Experimental Mechanistic Approach to Iron Catalyst and Reaction Design" research.

In 2019, Gutierrez was named the first Nathan Drake Faculty Fellow at the University of Maryland department of chemistry and biochemistry for his combination of computational chemistry and experimentation in organic chemistry research.

In 2020, Gutierrez was selected for American Chemistry Society's Chemical & Engineering News "Talented 12" recognition.
