= Marissa (name) =

- Pronunciation: /məˈrɪsə/
- Gender: Female

Origin
- Origin: Latin
- Meaning: Mermaid

Other names
- Related names: Marisa, Maris, Mary, Maria, Marie

Marissa is a feminine given name typically used in Western culture. It is a variation of Maris, which is Latin for 'of the sea'. It can also be spelled Marrisa, Merissa or Marisa. Marissa also means "little Mary" referring to the Virgin Mary.

== People ==
- Marissa Alexander, American woman convicted of aggravated assault
- Marissa Anita (born 1983), Indonesian journalist, actress, and television news presenter
- Marissa Aroy, Filipino-American director and producer
- Marissa Baks (born 1998), Dutch professional racing cyclist
- Marissa Bode (born 2000), American actress
- Marissa Brandt (born 1992), Korean-American ice hockey player
- Marissa Bridge, American artist
- Marissa Callaghan (born 1985), Northern Irish women's association football player
- Marissa Carpadios (born 1977), Australian softball player
- Marissa Castelli (born 1990), American retired pair skater
- Marissa Coleman (born 1987), American WNBA player
- Marissa Delgado (born 1951), Filipino actress
- Marissa DeVault (born 1977), American woman who murdered her husband
- Marissa Diggs (born 1992), American retired soccer player
- Marissa Dyan, American actress
- Marissa Everett (born 1997), American retired soccer player
- Marissa Garrido (1926–2021), Mexican telenovela playwright and writer
- Marissa Gibson (born c. 1995), Australian actress
- Marissa Giustina, American physicist
- Marissa Haque (born 1962), Indonesian actress and politician
- Marissa Hermer, English contestant on Ladies of London
- Marissa Irvin (born 1980), American tennis player
- Marissa Irwin, American model
- Marissa Jade, American contestant on Mob Wives
- Marissa Janning, American college basketball player
- Marissa Janssens (born 1988), Canadian water polo player
- Marissa Jaret Winokur (born 1973), American actress
- Marissa Jiménez (born 1979), Puerto Rican politician
- Marissa Johnson (born 1990/1991), American civil rights activist
- Marissa King (born 1991), English gymnast
- Marissa Kurtimah (born 1994), Sierra Leone–Canadian track and field athlete
- Marissa Lenti (born 1992), American voice actor, ADR director, and script writer
- Marissa Lingen (born 1978), American short fiction writer
- Marissa Mayer (born 1975), American business executive, President and CEO of Yahoo!
- Marissa Maurin (born 1966), Chilean sailor
- Marissa Mercado-Andaya (1969–2020), Filipina politician
- Marissa Meyer (born 1984), American novelist
- Marissa Mazzola-McMahon (born 1973), American film producer
- Marissa Mishelle (born 1989), American singer
- Marissa Mitchell, American candidate in the 2022 United States House of Representatives elections in Arizona
- Marissa Moss (born 1959), American children's book author
- Marissa Mulder, American singer and cabaret artist
- Marissa Nadler (born 1981), American singer-songwriter
- Marissa Neitling (born 1984), American actress
- Marissa Niroj (born 1979), Thai former professional tennis player
- Marissa Oakley (born 1999), American artistic gymnast
- Marissa Otten (born 1989), Dutch former professional racing cyclist
- Marissa Papaconstantinou (born 1999), Canadian Paralympic athlete
- Marissa Paternoster (born 1986), American artist, singer, and guitarist
- Marissa Perry (born 1985), American actress and singer
- Marissa Ponich (born 1987), Canadian fencer
- Marissa Ribisi (born 1974), American actress
- Marissa Roth (born 1957), American photojournalist
- Marissa Roy (born 1992), American attorney and politician
- Marissa Sanchez, Filipino former professional tennis player
- Marissa Selvig, American candidate in the 2022 United States House of Representatives election in Wyoming
- Marissa Shen (2004–2017), Canadian murder victim
- Marissa Sheva (born 1997), American NWSL player
- Marissa Stander Van der Merwe (born 1978), South African retired professional road cyclist
- Marissa Steen (born 1989), American professional golfer
- Marissa Stott, New Zealand actress
- Marissa Vosloo-Jacobs (born 1976), South African stage actress
- Marissa Webb, Korean-born American fashion designer and executive
- Marissa Whitley (born 1983), American former Miss Teen USA
- Marissa Yardley Clifford (born 1992), British-American visual artist and writer
- Marissa Young (born 1981), American softball coach

== Fictional characters ==
- Queen Marissa, in the 2007 Canadian/US computer-animated film Barbie as the Island Princess, voiced by Kate Fisher
- Marissa Benson, in the US sitcom iCarly, played by Mary Scheer
- Marissa Clark, in the US fantasy comedy-drama TV series Early Edition, played by Shanesia Davis-Williams
- Marissa Cooper, in the US teen drama TV series The O.C., played by Mischa Barton
- Marissa Craddock, in the Australian police drama TV series Blue Heelers, played by Heidi Arena
- Marissa Electricidad/Ice Princess, in the 2005 US 3D superhero adventure film The Adventures of Sharkboy and Lavagirl in 3-D, played by Sasha Pieterse
- Marissa Faireborn, main human protagonist in The Transformers series
- Marissa Moore, in the UK soap opera EastEnders, played by Finn Atkins
- Marissa Morgan, in the US legal drama TV series Bull, played by Geneva Carr
- Marissa D. Pineda-Zulyani/Marissa D. Pineda-Mansueto, in the 2020 Philippine drama series Ang sa Iyo ay Akin, played by Jodi Sta. Maria
- Marissa Schurr, in the US horror-thriller TV series Hannibal, played by Holly Deveaux
- Marissa Tasker, in the US TV soap opera All My Children, played by Brittany Allen and Sarah Glendening

== See also ==
- Marisa (given name)
- Melissa (sometimes pronounced as a homophone in other languages)
