= Maris (given name) =

Female given name

Maris is a primarily female given name with various origins.

The name can be derived from the Latin phrase Stella Maris ("star of the sea"), an epithet for the Virgin Mary. Because of its derivation, the name Maris is also related to other names that connote the ocean. Another theory holds that it is derived from reference to the Irish triple Goddess The Morrígan as 'the three Maries'. Maris can also refer to a Celtic root meaning "great", as is reflected in the name of the legendary queen regnant Onomaris. It is also related to the Scottish and Irish language forms for Maria, Mairi and Máire, as well as the Germanic and Danish name Maren. It is used as a unisex name in Germany and Sweden as well as a feminine name in Estonia, the Netherlands and the English speaking countries. It is also used as a short form or variation of Maria, especially common in Estonia, the Netherlands and Germany. Also, Maris is a short form of the biblical name Damaris. There is also the phonetically similar Latvian masculine name Māris with a different root.

== People ==
=== Female ===
- Maris King (born 1922), one of the first female Australian diplomats
- MARIS (born 1999), American singer-songwriter
- Maris Hubschmid, German journalist, chief editor of one of the major newspapers and winner of the Theodor Wolff Prize
- Maris Curran (born 1980), American filmmaker, known for films like Five Nights in Maine or Jeannette
- Maris Lauri (born 1966), Estonian politician
- Anita Maris Boggs (born 1888), American film educator and philanthropist
- Maris Kemal, journalist, writer and activist
- Maris Rõngelep (born 1984), Estonian track and field athlete
- Maris Soule (born 1939), American author of romance, romantic suspense novels and short stories
- Maris Wrixon (1916–1999), American film and television actress, wife of Rudi Fehr
- Cora Mildred Maris Clark (1885–1967), New Zealand hockey player
- Maris Mägi (born 1987), Estonian sprinter who specializes in the 400 metres
- Maris Kreizman, American Lit Hub critic, writer and podcast host of The Maris Review
- Maris Racal (born 1997), Filipino actress
- Maris Pfeiffer, German filmmaker and professor
- Maris Bustamante (born 1949), Mexican feminist artist

=== Male ===
- Maris, a saint and martyr of the group Maris, Martha, Abachum and Audifax
- Maris Cakars (1942–1992), editor of WIN (Workshop in Nonviolence) magazine (anti-Vietnam War) from 1970 to 1976
- Maris (bishop), 4th-century Bishop of Chalcedon
- Maris Martinsons, director of the Pacific Rim Institute for the Studies of Management
- Maris Bryant Pierce (1811–1874), Seneca chief, lawyer, land-rights activist
- Maris Valainis, American construction consultant and former actor

== Mythical or fictional characters ==
- Maris, name of Pharaoh's daughter (Exodus) (Moses' adoptive mother in the Bible) according to the chroniclers Michael the Syrian and Artapanus of Alexandria (Maris or Merris with the latter)
- Maris (mythology), an Etruscan god depicted as an infant, probably the god of fertility and love
- Maris Mayberry, female protagonist in the 1938 novel Maris by Grace Livingston Hill
- Maris Crane, fictional character from the TV show Frasier
- The female main character in the anime Maris the Chojo
- Maris Pallitax, the daughter of the Most High Academe in the young adult fantasy series The Edge Chronicles
- Maris Brood, a character and boss in the video game Star Wars: The Force Unleashed
- Maris, brother of Atymnius in Greek mythology
- Maris Bächle, female detective in the German crime show Ein Schwarzwaldkrimi
- Queen Maris the Maid, also known as the Most Fair, daughter of High King Garth Greenhand in A Song of Ice and Fire, the novel series that was adapted into Game of Thrones
- Maris Baratheon, noblewoman from House Baratheon in House of the Dragon, a prequel to Game of Thrones
- Maris Matherly-Reed, female main character in Sandra Brown's novel Envy
- Maris, female protagonist in George R. R. Martin's and Lisa Tuttle's novel Windhaven

== See also ==
- Māris, a Latvian masculine given name
- Maris the Great, promotional performance artist based in Denver, Colorado
