= Newton Public Schools =

School district in Newton, Massachusetts, United States

Location
- 100 Walnut Street, Newton, MA 02460 United States

District information
- Type: Public
- Grades: K–12
- Superintendent: Anna Nolin
- Schools: 22
- Budget: $240,496,480 total $18,778 per pupil (2016)

Students and staff
- Students: 12,674
- Teachers: 1,013
- Student–teacher ratio: 12.4 to 1

Other information
- Average SAT scores: 622 verbal 636 math 1258 total (2017–2018)
- Website: Newton Public Schools

Newton Public Schools is a school district in Newton, Massachusetts, United States. The district features four middle schools that lead into two high schools.

== Schools ==
The Newton Public Schools are organized into an elementary school (K–5), middle school (6–8), and high school (9–12) arrangement. There was a projected enrollment of 11,237 students for FY06.

Level	Number of schools	Student avg.	Student: teacher goal
Elementary	15	333	27:1
Middle	4	633	17:1
High	2	1,858	16.1:1

=== Elementary schools ===
- Angier Elementary School
- Bowen Elementary School
- Burr Elementary School
- Cabot Elementary School
- Countryside Elementary School
- Franklin Elementary School
- Horace Mann Elementary School
- Lincoln-Eliot Elementary School
- Mason-Rice Elementary School
- Memorial Spaulding Elementary School
- Peirce Elementary School
- Underwood Elementary School
- Ward Elementary School
- Williams Elementary School
- Frank Zervas Elementary School

=== Secondary schools ===
Middle schools

- Charles E. Brown
- Oak Hill
- Bigelow
- F.A. Day

High schools

- Newton North High School
- Newton South High School

== Textbook controversy ==
In October 2011, a controversy occurred over the content of a textbook used in World History classes throughout the district which contained content that was allegedly antisemitic. The textbook was later removed from the curriculum.

== Superintendent plagiarism ==
In July 2014, The Lion's Roar, the student newspaper of Newton South High School, accused Superintendent David Fleishman of using parts of a speech by Governor Deval Patrick without credit. The accusations were levied by two members of the class of 2014. After admitting that he had failed to cite the governor, the Newton School Committee fined Fleishman one week's pay of his $250,000 salary.

On December 19, 2014 the Massachusetts Attorney General found that the Newton Public Schools and School Committee Chair Matthew Hills had committed eight violations of the state's Open Meeting Law in June and July 2014. The violations occurred in connection with the plagiarism by Newton Superintendent David Fleishman. No sanctions were imposed on Hills other than reviewing the law.

== Newton Teacher's Association Strike ==
On January 18, 2024, the Newton Teacher's Association announced that 98% of its membership had voted in favor of going on strike the following day. This comes after the roughly 2,000 members have been working without a new contract since August 2023. The strike started on January 19, 2024 and lasted until February 2, 2024, with students missing 11 days of school.
