= Marisa Darasavath =

Laotian artist and translator

- Born: 1972 (age 53–54)
- Known for: Painting

Marisa Darasavath (born 1972) is a Laotian artist and translator who is cited in The New York Times as "one of Laos's leading contemporary artists".

== Life ==
Darasavath was born in Vientiane in 1972. A keen artist from a young age, developing an interest in Japanese animation, in 2008 she graduated from Laos's National Institute of Fine Arts. She attended the Fukuoka Asian Art Triennale in Japan in 2009 and has exhibited in Bangkok, Kuala Lumpur and Bali. In 2011 she showcased her works for two months at the M Gallery outpost in Vientiane, and in 2013 she was one of only two Laotian artists to feature in the Singapore Biennale. In April–July 2012, Darasavath was the only Laotian artist represented in the "Open Sea" gallery at the Museum of Contemporary Art in Lyon, France, focusing on southeastern Asian art.

== Style and works ==
Darasavath's work is typical bold, colourful and surrealistic. She often depicts Laotian women, particularly from ethnic minorities, functioning in everyday life, such as weaving or grating coconuts. She has taken inspiration from her work in her extensive travels across Laos and has developed her own artistic voice, often incorporating elements of history with the present. She states that she is not a political artist and that she wants to be "a free agent, to have free thoughts and not get caught up in agendas".

Notable oil on canvas paintings, which have been showcased at the M Gallery, include: Spirit Of Mother - Hmong (2009), Spirit Of Mother Colourful Poppy (2010), Hmong (2010), Spirit Of Mother - Umbrella IV (2010), Cooking Sticky Rice (2012) and Bathing By The River.
