= Marisa Kozlowski =

American chemist (born 1967)

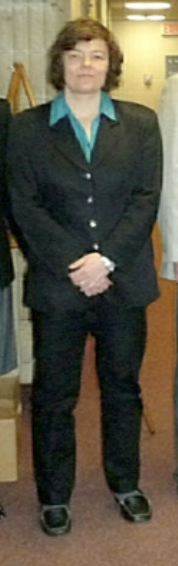
Marisa C. Kozlowski
- Born: Hamburg
- Education: Cornell University; University of California, Berkeley
- Scientific career
- Workplaces: University of Pennsylvania; Harvard University
- Thesis: Inhibition studies of three related chorismate-utilizing enzymes : Rigid tendamistat mimics as a-amylase inhibitors (1994)
- Doctoral advisor: Paul A Bartlett
- Website: MCK group

Marisa C. Kozlowski (born 1967) is an American chemist who is Professor of Organic and Catalysis Chemistry at the University of Pennsylvania. Her research considers asymmetric synthesis and the development of cost effective catalysts. She was elected Fellow of the American Association for the Advancement of Science in 2012 and American Chemical Society in 2013.

== Early life and education ==
Kozlowski was born in Hamburg, and raised in Liverpool, New York. She studied chemistry at Cornell University. She moved to California for her graduate studies, where she joined the laboratory of Paul Bartlett at the University of California, Berkeley. As an undergraduate, she only knew of one woman member of faculty, and as a postgraduate only two. Her research considered the design of enzyme inhibitors. She moved to Harvard University as a postdoctoral research fellow, where she worked with David A. Evans on organic synthesis.

== Research and career ==
In 1997, Kozlowski joined the faculty at the University of Pennsylvania, where she was eventually promoted to professor of chemistry. Kozlowski studies asymmetric high throughput synthesis and novel approaches to catalysis. She has developed computational programs to better understand chemical reactions. These programs make use of machine learning and electronic structure calculations to iteratively design new synthesis protocols.

Kozlowski was made associate editor of The Journal of Organic Chemistry in 2013, and editor-in-chief of Organic Letters in 2021.

== Awards and honors ==
- 1998 DuPont Young Investigator Award
- 2001 National Science Foundation CAREER Award
- 2002 Alfred P. Sloan Research Fellowship
- 2002 American Cancer Society Beginning Research Scholar Award
- 2010 Philadelphia Organic Chemists’ Club Award
- 2012 Elected Fellow of the American Association for the Advancement of Science
- 2013 Elected Fellow of the American Chemical Society
- 2021 Appointed Editor-in-Chief of Organic Letters

== Selected publications ==
- Scott E Allen; Ryan R Walvoord; Rosaura Padilla-Salinas; Kozlowski, Marisa (2013). "Aerobic copper-catalyzed organic reactions". Chemical Reviews. 113 (8): 6234–6458. doi:10.1021/cr300527g. PMC 3818381. PMID 23786461. Wikidata Q38115817.
- Kozlowski, Marisa; Barbara J Morgan; Elizabeth C Linton (2009). "Total synthesis of chiral biaryl natural products by asymmetric biaryl coupling". Chemical Society Reviews. 38 (11): 3193–3207. doi:10.1039/b821092f. PMC 2904069. PMID 19847351. Wikidata Q33994511.
- Gutierrez, Osvaldo; John C. Tellis; David N. Primer; Molander, Gary; Kozlowski, Marisa (2015). "Nickel-catalyzed cross-coupling of photoredox-generated radicals: uncovering a general manifold for stereoconvergence in nickel-catalyzed cross-couplings". Journal of the American Chemical Society. 137 (15): 4896–4899. doi:10.1021/ja513079r. PMC 4576934. PMID 25836634. Wikidata Q36078422.
- Walsh, Patrick J.; Kozlowski, Marisa C. (2 January 2009). Fundamentals of asymmetric catalysis. Sausalito, Calif. ISBN 978-1-891389-54-2. OCLC 173807512.
