= Marisa Serrano =

Brazilian senator

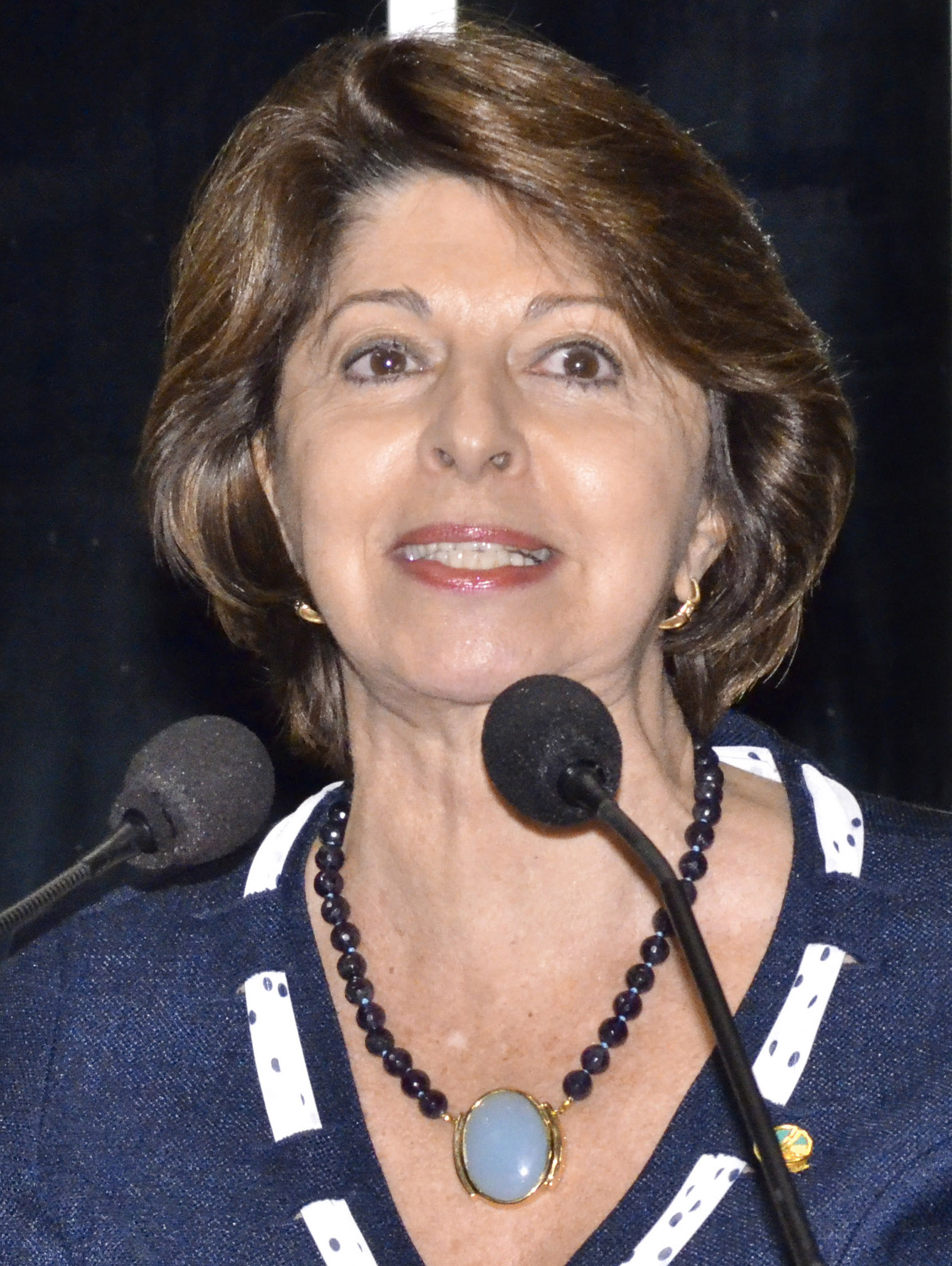
- Occupations: Politician; Educator
- Years active: 1977–present

Marisa Serrano is a Brazilian politician and educator.

== Life and career ==
Serrano served in the Brazilian Senate from 2007 to 2011. Serrano studied Literature and Pedagogy, and in 1977 she became a city councilor in the city of Campo Grande. From 1980 to 1982, she was the Secretary of State for Education in Mato Grosso do Sul. Serrano then served two terms as a federal deputy, the first from 1995 to 1999, and the second from 1999 to 2003. In 2004 she became the vice-mayor of Campo Grande, before contesting the 2006 senatorial elections. She became a senator in 2007, and left office in 2011.
