= Marisa T. Darden =

American lawyer

Marisa Darden

Personal details
- Citizenship: American
- Education: University of Michigan (BA); Duke University (JD)
- Occupation: Lawyer

Marisa Tara Darden is an American lawyer who was confirmed to serve as United States attorney for the Northern District of Ohio but later withdrew from the position.

== Education ==
Darden earned a Bachelor of Arts from the University of Michigan in 2005 and a Juris Doctor from the Duke University School of Law.

== Career ==
In 2010 and 2011, Darden served as a law clerk for Judge Morrison C. England Jr. From 2011 to 2014, she was an assistant district attorney in the New York County District Attorney's Office. From 2014 to 2019, she served as assistant United States attorney in the United States Attorney's Office for the Northern District of Ohio. Since 2019, she has worked as a principal at Squire Patton Boggs in Cleveland.

== Nomination as U.S. attorney ==
On November 12, 2021, President Joe Biden announced his intent to nominate Darden to be the United States attorney for the Northern District of Ohio. On November 15, 2021, her nomination was sent to the United States Senate. On February 10, 2022, her nomination was reported out of committee by a voice vote. On April 27, 2022, her nomination was confirmed in the Senate by voice vote. On May 17, 2022, despite being confirmed by the Senate, Darden withdrew her name from consideration for position as U.S. attorney, citing her family. She will return to private practice. She would have been the first Black woman U.S. attorney in northern Ohio.
