= Marisa Catalina Casey =

American photographer

Marisa Catalina Casey (born in Bogotá, Colombia on November 5, 1979), is a photographer, graphic designer, educator, and co-author of the book Born in Our Hearts. A current Peace Corps volunteer in Ecuador (2012-2014), Casey is the founder and executive director of Starting Artist, a nonprofit organization benefiting underserved youth in Brooklyn, New York through training in the arts and entrepreneurship. Her 6-word memoir and photo-illustration are included in the book, Not Quite What I Was Planning: Six-Word Memoirs by Writers Famous and Obscure and she is a contributor to the 2010 book, The World I Dream Of.

Casey was a semi-finalist for the 2007-8 and 2008-9 Echoing Green Fellowship for Social Entrepreneurs and was a 2008-9 YouthActionNet Global Fellow through the International Youth Foundation. Chosen to participate in the 2009 American Express Nonprofit Leadership Institute, Casey was the only American representative at the 2010 Lucca Leadership Foundations course in South Africa. Casey is a newly named member of the Transatlantic Network 2020 (TN2020), a coalition of young Europeans and North Americans run by the British Council taking collaborative action on global issues, and is finishing her 3-year term on the Americans for the Arts Emerging Leaders Council.

Casey was raised in Newton, Massachusetts and attended Newton South High School (Class of 1997). She then attended Brown University and graduated with honors in Latin American Studies in 2001. Casey later received grants from the Production Workshop and the Creative Arts Council to complete her creative thesis project, Latin America in Abstract: A Personal Journey. She earned her Masters of Arts in Arts Administration from Teachers College, Columbia University.

Casey's photography has been published by the non-governmental organization CARE, and in several literary arts journals. She received a grant from the Newton chapter of the Massachusetts Cultural Council for her photography and has been interviewed by the Boston Globe, the Boston Herald, the New York Daily News, and the Providence Journal, among other publications.

Casey's father is an attorney in Boston, Massachusetts; her mother is the Founder and Executive Director of the Alliance for Children international adoption agency and the Alliance for Children Foundation.
