= Marisa Lankester =

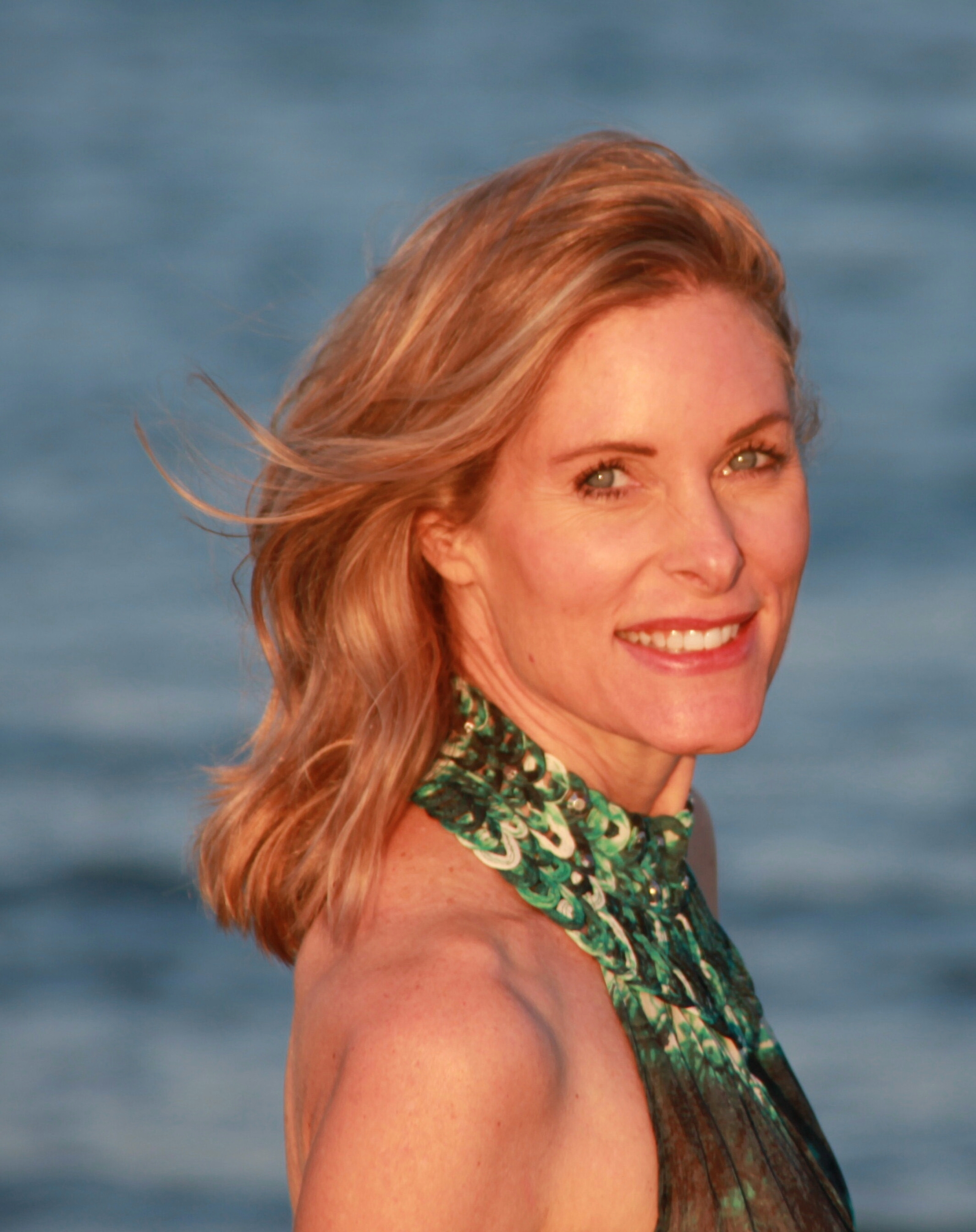
- in Zurich 2014
- Born: 1963 (age 62–63); Rome, Italy
- Education: Marymount Manhattan College; University of British Columbia
- Occupations: Writer, author

Marisa J. Lankester (born 1963) is a memoirist whose 2014 book, Dangerous Odds, told the story of her life, from growing up privileged in the suburbs of New York City and post-grad years in Vancouver, British Columbia, Canada, to working in the heart of the largest illegal sports betting operation in US history, including arrests in Los Angeles and Dominican Republic), to living a comfortable life in Switzerland. The book won three awards.

== Early Bookmaking Years ==
Marisa Lankester was born in Rome, and raised in Westchester County, NY by an English father who worked at the United Nations and German mother, and attended the all-girls Catholic independent Ursuline School. She attended Marymount Manhattan College before moving to Vancouver, BC, and later to Los Angeles, CA

In June 1987, Lankester was arrested on charges of bookmaking, along with six other employees, after Los Angeles sheriffs, aided by information by two FBI informants, raided the office where she worked as a clerk for Ron (the Cigar) Sacco, operator of a sophisticated horse racing and sports betting operation that processed "at least $40 million" in bets in 1986 and considered the biggest bookmaker in American history.

Lankester married Sacco's right-hand man, Tony Ballestrasse, in 1987 and gave birth to a daughter before locating with Sacco's operation to Santo Domingo, Dominican Republic where gambling was legal; although a top model on the Island, she was jailed twice and endured repeated rapes after the FBI and local police raided Sacco’s headquarters in January 1992 (at the time the operation was taking in $100 million/month in bets and considered the "nerve center of American sports betting.") Dominican police corruption included hiding Lankester from the FBI against her will. As an insider, Lankester was also aware of the role off-shore (shell companies) played in Sacco's operation.

== Later years ==
Retiring permanently from bookmaking in 1994, she moved back to New York in 1996 to attend college in Manhattan. She remarried and moved to Switzerland where she had her second daughter (later divorced). She currently resides in Zürich, Switzerland with her family. Lankester was interviewed by the NY Daily News and active in debates surrounding US gambling laws (refer "Works" below) including input on the recent ban reversal in pro-sports. She published her memoirs, Dangerous Odds, in 2014. In an April 2019 interview, Lankester expanded on her current life and movie development activities.

== Works ==
- Marisa Lankester (2014). Dangerous Odds: My Secret Life Inside an Illegal Billion Dollar Sports Betting Operation. Cappuccino Books Publishing. ISBN 9783906196008.
- Marisa Lankester (May 29, 2014). "Feds should fold in their fight against N.J. sports gambling: Opinion". NJ.com.
- Marisa Lankester (December 9, 2015). "Tough odds for daily fantasy: A former bookmaker offers advice to DraftKings and FanDuel". nydailynews.com. Archived from the original on 2015-12-11.
