= Marisa Kabas =

American journalist (born 1987)

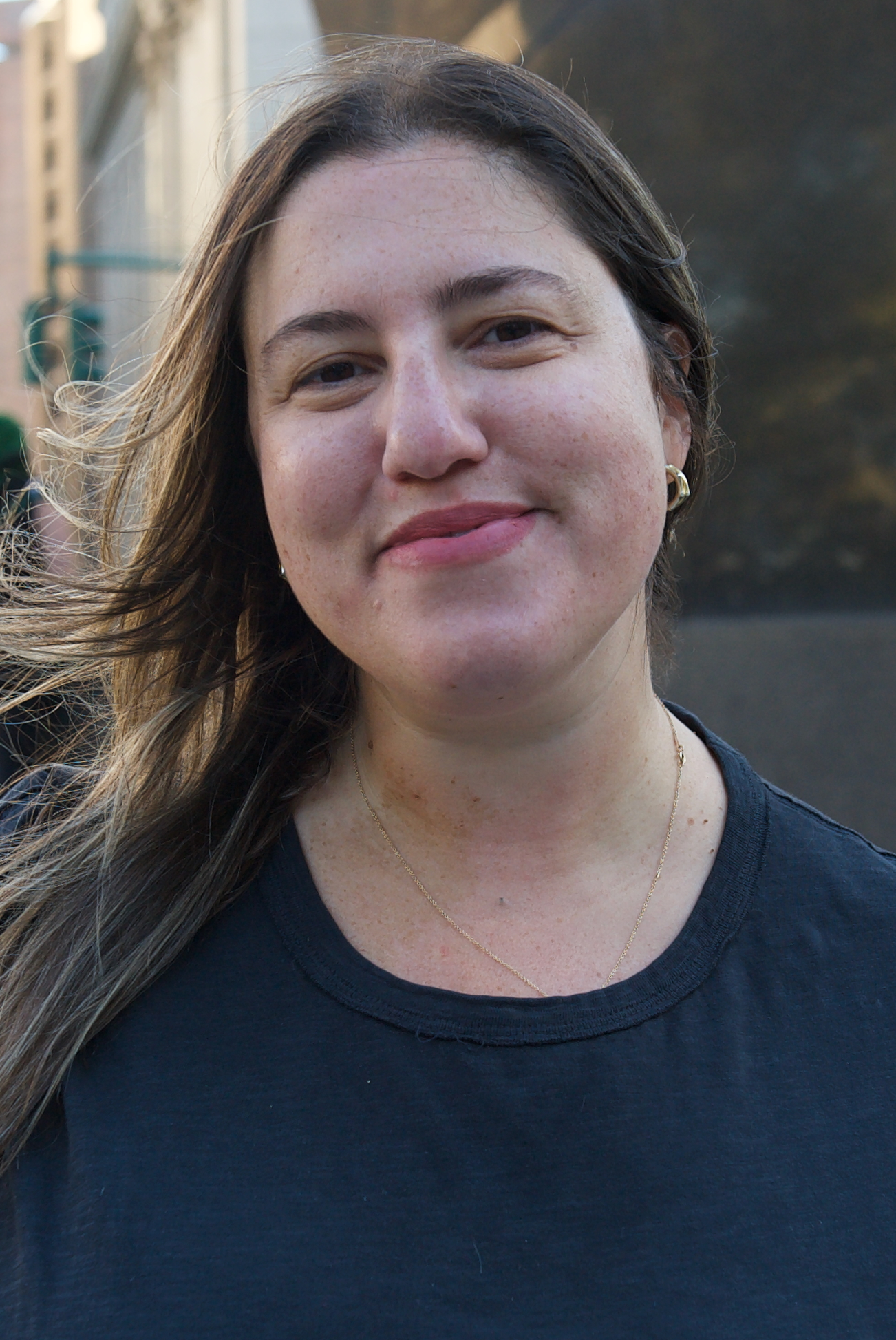
- Kabas in 2025
- Born: August 4, 1987 (age 39)
- Education: Journalism (2009)
- Alma mater: George Washington University
- Occupation: Journalist
- Spouse: Ben
- Website: thehandbasket.co

Marisa Kabas (KAY-bis; born August 4, 1987) is an American independent journalist, former political strategist, and creator of the newsletter The Handbasket.

== Career ==
Kabas worked in public relations before becoming a journalist. She started freelancing for Today.com before moving to work at The Daily Dot and Fusion TV online. Kabas has written freelance for MSNBC, the Huffington Post, The New Republic, and Rolling Stone.

She was the director of Crush 2020, a political action organization, and a former political strategist.

She started her newsletter, The Handbasket, in June 2022 for personal writing and essays, before switching to reporting the next year. The newsletter, free and named after the phrase "to hell in a handbasket," also has a paid subscription. She began writing full-time in 2024 for her newsletter. The Handbasket provided daily updates on George Santos' scandals, and about The Kansas Reflector, which was raided by police in 2023.

Kabas broke the news that Trump's second administration ordered staff at the National Institutes of Health to stop travelling. Days later, she broke the news that it was also freezing federal grants, first posting on Bluesky about it. Her scoops increased the amount of paid subscribers from 800 to 1,900. The memo on federal grants was reversed two days after Kabas posted about it. The Associated Press called it "a key moment for a growing cadre of journalists who work independently to gather and analyze news and market themselves as brands." As of October 2025, The Handbasket has approximately 4,000 paid subscribers.

== Personal life ==
Kabas grew up on Long Island, graduated from George Washington University where she wrote for The GW Hatchet, and lives in Brooklyn, New York City with her husband. She is Jewish and had a grandparent that survived the Holocaust. Kabas has had acromegaly caused by a tumor called pituitary adenoma, diagnosed in 2018, and wrote extensively about her treatment on the blogging website Medium. She had the tumor cells removed from her brain in early 2021. Years later, she had a miscarriage with her husband, Ben.

== See also ==
- 404 Media
- Defector Media
- Aftermath (website)
