= Marisa Hamamoto =

Japanese-American dancer and entrepreneur

- Born: Japan
- Education: Kirov Academy of Ballet, Idyllwild Arts Academy, Keio University
- Occupations: Speaker, dancer, social entrepreneur
- Organization: Infinite Flow
- Website: www.marisahamamoto.com

Marisa Hamamoto (Japanese: 浜本 まり紗) is a Japanese-American dancer, spokesperson for disability advocacy, and social entrepreneur based in California, United States. She is the founder and artistic director of Infinite Flow Dance, a Los Angeles–based nonprofit and professional dance company whose mission is to bring accessibility and inclusion of disabled and non-disabled people to dance opportunities.

== Biography ==
Hamamoto was born in Aichi Prefecture, Japan, and raised in Irvine, California. She trained at the Kirov Academy of Ballet in Washington, D.C., and the Idyllwild Arts Academy. She graduated from Keio University in Tokyo, Japan, with a BA in 2007 and MA in 2009.

While taking a dance class in 2006, she was paralyzed from the neck down due to a disease called spinal cord infarction. She recovered most of her mobility and walked out of the hospital two months after the diagnosis. In 2014, she witnessed wheelchair dancing at the Abilities Expo in Los Angeles and became interested in the area of dance and disability. Later in her life, she was diagnosed with Post-traumatic stress disorder (PTSD) and Autism, which are often considered invisible disabilities. These experiences motivated her work for inclusion and healing through dance movement.

In March 2015, she founded Infinite Flow – An Inclusive Dance Company. This dance company is a nonprofit and professional wheelchair ballroom dance company composed of dancers with and without disabilities. The company also uses dance movement as a driver for social inclusion and innovation.

For dance events and shows, Hamamoto partners with Adelfo Cerame Jr., a paraplegic bodybuilder, and Piotr Iwanicki, a wheelchair Dancesport world champion. As her company continues to grow, she collaborates with other artists with different disabilities, like Mia Schaikewitz and Natalie Trevonne. The Infinity Flow Dance company has held many performances, mainly in California and it has partnered with large companies, such as Red Bull, Google, Meta, Deloittle, and Apple.

== Recognition ==
Hamamoto was recognized in 2019 by Dance-Teacher magazine for her commitment and service in the field of dance. She was also a recipient of San Fernando Valley Business Journal's Women in Business Awards. She is currently appointed as Honorary Member of the International Association for Dance Medicine and Science (IADMS).
