= Marisa Roberto =

American neuroscientist

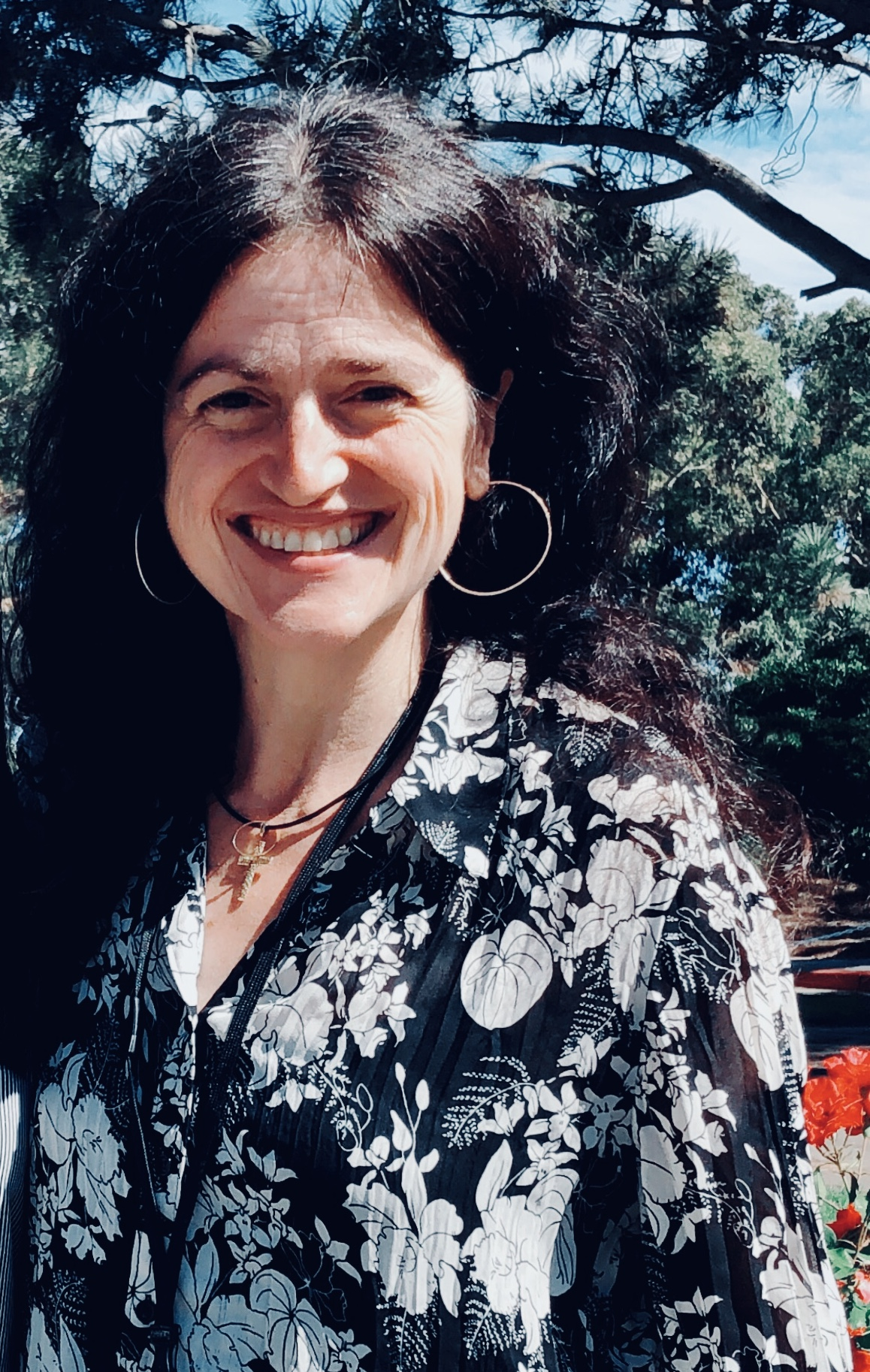
- Born: c. 1971; Volterra, Italy
- Citizenship: Italy and United States
- Education: University of Pisa
- Known for: Effects of alcohol and neuropeptides on synaptic transmission in the central amygdala.
- Awards: Presidential Early Career Awards for Scientists and Engineers (PECASE), 2009; Knight of the “Order of Merit of the Republic of Italy”, 2011; The Jacob P. Waletzky Award from the Society for Neuroscience, 2016
- Scientific career
- Fields: Neuropharmacology, Neuroscience and Addiction
- Workplaces: The Scripps Research Institute
- Academic advisors: Marcello Brunelli, Donna Gruol, and George R. Siggins
- Website: www.scripps.edu/roberto/index.html

Marisa Roberto is an Italian-American neuroscientist and professor in the Department of Molecular Medicine and Neuroscience at The Scripps Research Institute in La Jolla, California. Roberto is recognized for her contributions to the understanding of alcohol addiction, specifically for her research on the effects of alcohol and neuromodulators (e.g., neuropeptides and neuroimmune mediators) on synaptic transmission in the central amygdala, a critical addiction-related brain region.

== Early life and education ==
Marisa Roberto was born in Volterra, Italy in 1971. Her parents Maria Gemma and Immacolato Roberto own agricultural land for farming. She is one of four siblings and is the middle child of her two living brothers. She was the only one to pursue higher education and is a first generation high school, college, and doctoral graduate.

Roberto pursued a B.A. in biology from the University of Pisa. She completed her experimental thesis titled "Mechanisms of modulation of the Na+/K+-ATPasic pump in the T neurons of the leech Hirudo medicinalis by a sea-weed biotoxin," and graduated with distinction in 1996. She went on to complete her Ph.D. in Basic Neuroscience under the mentorship of Dr. Marcello Brunelli from the University of Pisa in 2001. Her graduate worked focused on the effects of the neuropeptide, PACAP-38, on synaptic transmission and long-term potentiation, a neural correlate of learning and memory, in the rodent hippocampus. In 1999 during her graduate studies, Roberto joined the Department of Neuropharmacology at The Scripps Research Institute as a visiting student to study the effects of alcohol on synaptic transmission in the amygdala and long-term potentiation in the hippocampus under the mentorship of Drs. George Siggins and Donna Gruol, respectively. After completing her Ph.D. in 2001, Roberto returned to Scripps as a postdoctoral fellow in the laboratory of Dr. George Siggins to study the neuroadaptations in synaptic transmission induced by acute and chronic alcohol in the central amygdala, a brain region critical in mediating the behavioral effects of alcohol consumption.

== Career and research ==
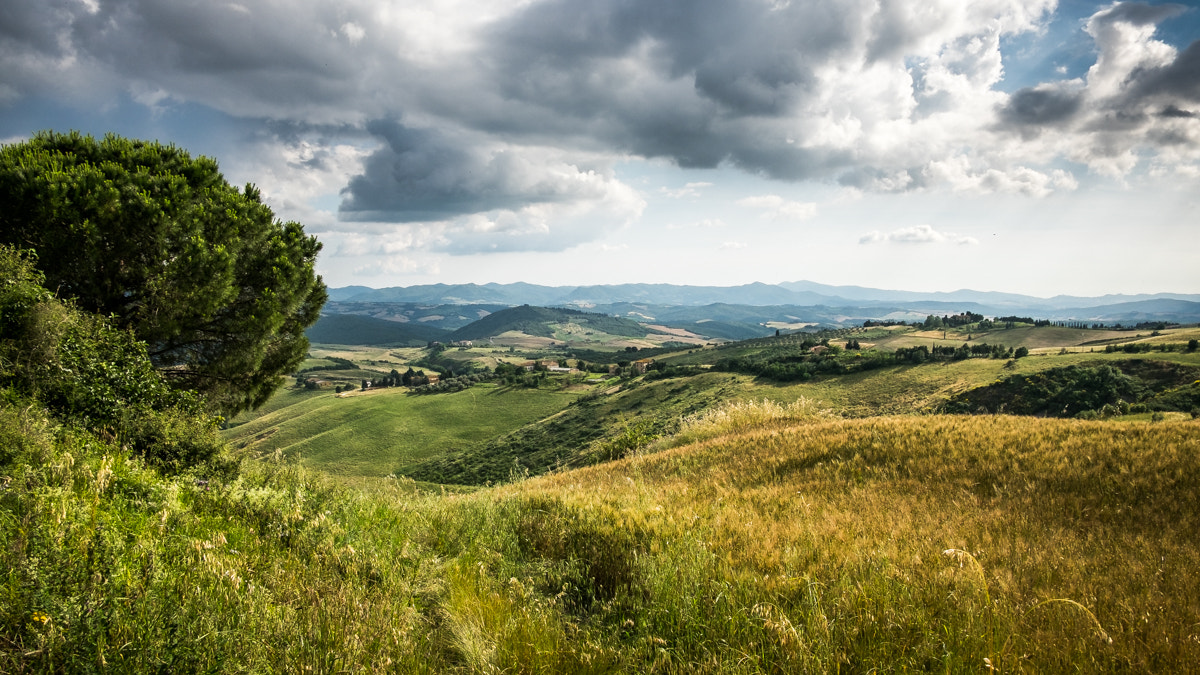
Volterra, Italy

In 2005, Roberto became an assistant professor in the Molecular and Integrative Neuroscience Department at the Scripps Research Institute and then the Committee on Neurobiology of Addictive Disorders in 2006. Roberto's research demonstrated the role of pro- and anti-stress neuropeptidergic (e.g. corticotropin-releasing factor, nociceptin, and neuropeptide Y) signaling on GABAergic transmission in the central amygdala following excessive drinking and alcohol dependence.

In 2015, Roberto was promoted to a tenured professor position and became an adjunct professor in the Department of Psychiatry at the University of California San Diego. In 2016, Roberto received a merit award from the National Institute for Alcohol Abuse and Alcoholism to study the effects of the brain stress peptide, corticotropin-releasing factor and endocannabinoids, on stress-induced alcohol seeking and anxiety-like behaviors in Alcohol Preferring msP rats - to assess gene-environment interactions.

Roberto is the scientific director of the Integrative Neuroscience Initiative on Alcoholism (INIA) Neuroimmune consortium, the scientific director of The Scripps Research Institute's Alcohol Research Institute, and a researcher in The Pearson Center for Alcoholism and Addiction Research. She serves as a senior editor on the editorial board for Neuropharmaology since 2016 and organizes the triennial international meeting on 'Alcoholism and Stress: A Framework for Future Treatment Strategies' in her hometown Volterra, Italy (2008, 2011, 2014, 2017, and 2020).

In 2026, Roberto worked with other researchers on a study about the role of interleukin-6 (IL-6) in alcohol dependence. They found that blocking IL-6 receptor signaling reduced the amount of alcohol consumption in alcohol-dependent female mice.

== Awards and honors ==
Roberto won the Young Investigator Award from the Research on Alcoholism in 2005 and from the European Society for Biomedical Research on Alcoholism in 2007. She was a recipient of the Presidential Early Career Awards for Scientists and Engineers from President Barack Obama in the United States in 2009. Roberto was awarded the Cavaliere (knight) degree of the Order of Merit of the Republic of Italy, the nation's highest honor, for her research contributions to the neurobiology of addictive behavior in 2011. Roberto also received the Jacob P. Waletzky Award, recognizing innovative research in drug addiction and alcoholism, from the Society of Neuroscience in 2016.

== Selected publications ==
- Varodayan FP, de Guglielmo G, Logrip ML, George O, Roberto M. (2017) Alcohol dependence disrupts amygdalar L-type voltage-gated calcium channel mechanisms. Journal of Neuroscience
- Herman M.A., Contet C., Justice N.J., Vale W. and Roberto M. (2013) Subunit-specific tonic GABA currents and differential effects of ethanol within the central amygdala circuitry of CRF1 reporter mice. The Journal of Neuroscience
- Cruz M.T., Herman M., Kallupi M. and Roberto M. (2012) Nociceptin/orphanin FQ blockade of the CRF-induced GABA Release in the Central Amygdala is enhanced after chronic ethanol treatment. Biological Psychiatry
- Roberto M., Cruz M.T., Gilpin N.W., Sabino V., Schweitzer P., Bajo M., Cottone P., Madamba S.M, Stouffer D.G., Zorrilla E.P., Koob G.F., Siggins G.R, Parsons L.H. (2010) Corticotropin releasing factor-induced amygdala gamma-aminobutyric Acid release plays a key role in alcohol dependence. Biological Psychiatry
- Roberto M., Madamba S., Moore S.D., Tallent M.K. and Siggins G.R. (2003) Ethanol Increases GABAergic Transmission at Both Pre- and Postsynaptic Sites in Rat Central Amygdala Neurons. Proceedings of the National Academy of Sciences USA
