= Mareşal =

Mareşal may refer to:

- Mareșal (Romania)
- Mareşal (Turkey)
- Mareșal (tank destroyer), designed in Romania during World War II
