= E Chen =

Taiwanese visual artist (born 1966)

E Chen (born 1966, Taiwan) is a Taiwanese visual artist an assistant professor of Art at the Tainan National University of the Arts who is primarily known for his fictional architecture project "The Titanica Casino and Iceberg Hotel" (1998). He lives and works in both Taiwan and Canada.

== Biography ==
Chen graduated from the University of California, Los Angeles in 1993 earning a Master of Fine Arts in Sculpture and went on to study architecture at University of California, Berkeley, graduating with a Master of Architecture in 1997.

== Exhibitions ==
=== Select solo exhibitions ===
- Base Piece–E Chen Solo Exhibition, Kuandu Museum of Fine Arts (2015)
- Wunderkammer, Taipei Fine Arts Museum, Taipei, Taiwan (2010)
- String of time, Indianapolis museum of Art, Indianapolis, USA (2005)
- United Paper, Hammer Project UCLA Hammer Museum, Los Angeles, USA (2001)
- Titanica, Richard Telles Fine Art, Los Angeles, USA (1998)

=== Select group exhibitions ===
- Regionalism in Kogei, 2nd International Triennale of Kogei in Kanazawa, Japan (2013)
- Wonder, 2008 Singapore Biennale, Singapore (2008)
- Biennale cuvee, ok space, Linz, Austria (2008)
- Dirty Yoga, 2006 Taipei Biennial, Taipei Fine Arts Museum, Taiwan (2006)
- Market place, University of Iowa Museum of Art, Iowa, USA (2006–08)
- Magic Hour, Art and Las Vegas", Neue Galerie Graz am Landesmuseum Joanneum, Austria (2001)

== See also ==
- Taiwanese art
