= Maris Kreizman =

American writer, critic, and feminist

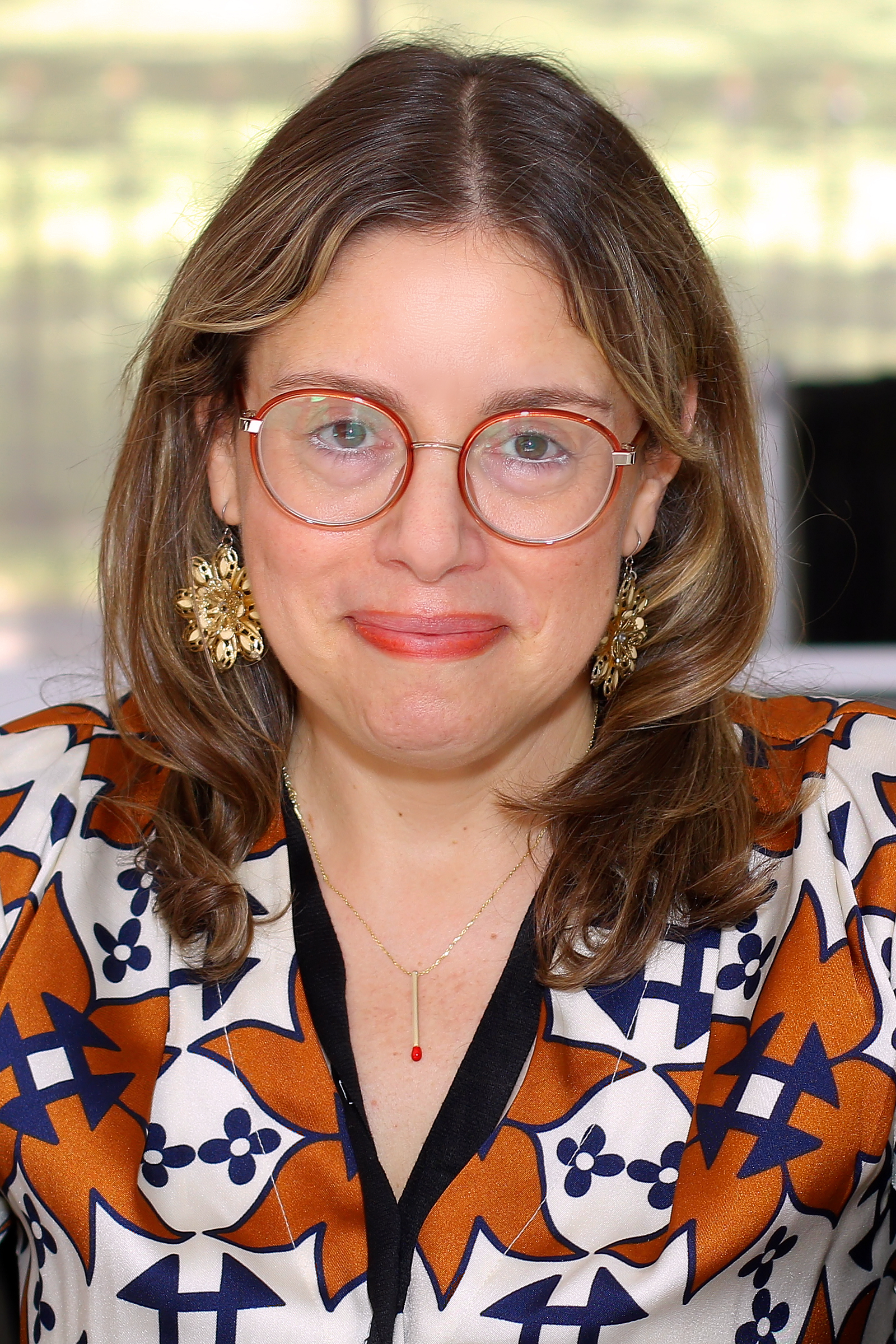
- Kreizman at the 2025 Texas Book Festival
- Born: Maris Kreizman
- Education: University of Pennsylvania (BA)
- Occupations: Author; Essayist; Critic
- Writing career
- Years active: 2018–present
- Genres: nonfiction, pop culture
- Notable work: I Want to Burn This Place Down: Essays (2025)
- Website: www.mariskreizman.com

Maris Kreizman is an essayist and critic with a bi-weekly column at Lit Hub, whose work has appeared in The Wall Street Journal, The New York Times, The LA Times, Vanity Fair, BuzzFeed, Esquire, Glamour, and GQ. She is also the author of the nonfiction books Slaughterhouse 90210 and I Want to Burn This Place Down.

== Early life and education ==
Kreizman grew up in New Jersey. She graduated from the University of Pennsylvania with a degree in English in 2000. She followed up her degree by taking the Radcliffe Publishing Course.

== Career ==
Kreizman got her start working in publishing at Free Press in 2001, and later at Counterpoint Press, where she was an editor until 2007. She was listed as one of the Publishers Weekly Notables of the Year, and was profiled in Refinery 29 after "landing her dream job." The Observer then followed a day in her life. She began working as a full-time freelance writer in 2017.

Kreizman's first book, Slaughterhouse 90210, began as a Tumblr in 2009, pairing pop culture images with literary quotes. It was published by Flatiron Books in 2015.

In 2015, Maris started a nationwide Book of the Month club to promote diversity in reading. The LA Times profiled her book club, commenting, "It's not your grandma's book of the month club." Amy Poehler's Smart Girls talked about Kreizman's contribution, through her book club, to Women's History Month.

Poets & Writers magazine called Kreizman one the funniest voices on Twitter, and Refinery29 said she's changing the literary landscape. Vogue called her and her husband, Josh Gondelman the "George and Amal of the Twitter-Lit World".

In 2025, Kreizman published her second book, I Want to Burn This Place Down: Essays, through HarperCollins imprint Ecco Press. Kirkus Reviews described the collection as "Unexpectedly charming personal essays about disillusionment, diabetes, and despair...an intelligent and entertaining read." TIME named it one of "The 100 Must-Read Books of 2025".

== Personal life ==
She lives in Brooklyn with her husband Josh Gondelman and their pug Bizzy.

== Works and publications ==
=== Books ===
- Slaughterhouse 90210. Flatiron Books. 2015. ISBN 9781250061126.
- I Want to Burn this Place Down: Essays. Ecco Press. 2025. ISBN 9780063305823.

=== Selected articles ===
- (29 March 2018) "Meg Wolitzer's 'The Female Persuasion' leads the charge toward a better, feminist world" Los Angeles Times
- (25 June 2018) "MTV's Daria reboot is the perfect vehicle to channel our collective hatred for America's phonies" NBC News
- (20 August 2018) "My Self-Care Routine Is Following Pugs On Instagram" BuzzFeed
- (10 May 2019) "How Casey Cep Wrote the True Crime Book Harper Lee Couldn't" Vulture
- (1 November 2019) "Carmen Maria Machado's New Memoir Fills In The Gray Areas Of Abuse" BuzzFeed
- (9 April 2019) "Why I Am Stockpiling Insulin in My Fridge" The New York Times
- (11 May 2019) "Listening to My Neighbors Fight" The Atlantic
- (20 November 2019) "Why the Publishing Industry Just Can't Quit Donald Trump Junior" Vanity Fair
- (5 February 2020) My family founded Barneys. Now the great department store is closing. Vox
- (11 February 2020) "John Bolton's Book Deal Is Part of a Worrying Trend in Book Publishing" Vox
- (17 March 2020) "Q&A with James McBride" The Wall Street Journal
- (24 May 2022) "The Legacy of Gone Girl" Esquire
- (5 December 2023) "The Best Books of 2023" Vulture
- (24 December 2023) "Let's Rescue Book Lovers From This Online Hellscape"The New York Times
