= Marisa Papen =

Belgian model and naturist

Marisa Papen is a Belgian model and naturist, known for posing nude in unconventional and controversial locations.

== Life ==
Papen was born in Limburg. After high school, she studied marketing. In 2015 she started working as a model and was photographed for Playboy in Germany (2017), Mexico (2019, with Ana Dias) and Portugal (2016). In 2016 she published a calendar in which she addressed the problem of plastic in the ocean. A year later, Papen made headlines all over the world when she was photographed naked in Egyptian temples. Because of this, she was arrested for taking nude photos, which results in a criminal record in Egypt. The photographer deleted the photos before arrest, so they were released. In 2018, she posed nude for photographs in the Vatican and Jerusalem.
