= Witness Collection =

Private collection of Vietnamese art

Witness Collection is one of the largest private collections of Vietnamese art in the world. It conducts detailed research into the art in its collection and Vietnam's 20th century history, as well as providing state-of-the-art conservation.

The collection comprises approximately 2,000 works of Vietnamese modern and contemporary art since the early 20th century. The collection includes more than 120 Vietnamese artists, whose careers documented the changes that occurred in Vietnam during its recent history.

Subjects range from folk, academic and propaganda art, in styles that include but are not limited to socialist realism, cubism, expressionism and abstraction. The collection reveals diverse social, political and historical commentaries.

== Collection ==
=== History ===
Witness Collection's origin traces to the founder's ambition to document Vietnam's post-war condition in 1984. The first works were acquired in Hanoi in 1987, including watercolours, silks, woodblock prints and drawings of villages and scenes in Hanoi.

On subsequent trips to Vietnam, the collection was curated and developed. By 2002, the collection had grown to several hundred art works. Over the next year, and after in-depth advice from Vietnamese art specialists, Witness Collection was founded in 2002. Art works added to the collection after the organisation's creation were sourced from Vietnam, Thailand, Singapore, Hong Kong Taiwan, Japan, France, Italy, Australia and the United States.

=== Periods ===
==== First Generation: École des Beaux-Arts de l’Indochine Influenced (1920s-1945) ====
Witness Collection includes art works by École des Beaux-Arts de l’Indochine founder Victor Tardieu and his successor Joseph Inguimberty. Using pencil, pastel and oils, Tardieu and Imguimberty created works inspired by Vietnamese communities and the natural environment in classical styles.

The collection also includes Vietnamese artists influenced by the École des Beaux-Arts de l’Indochine. Art works by Bùi Xuân Phái and Nguyễn Văn Tỵ, for example, emphasise this influence through classical portraits, landscapes, urbanscapes and community scenes.

However, the collection also contains artists that departed from the predominantly French-inspired style of the time. Collected artists Trần Văn Cẩn and Tô Ngọc Vân are considered two of the pioneering “Four Masters” of Vietnamese modern art. Others, such as Tạ Tỵ, developed modern Vietnamese art through abstract portraits.

Tú Duyên, a student of the École des Beaux-Arts de l’Indochine until 1942, devised a new technique using only positive and negative woodblocks on silk or paper, adding colours by hand in what he called ‘hand-stamped printing’.

After graduating the École des Beaux-Arts de l’Indochine, Huỳnh Văn Thuận joined the Việt Minh soon after. His works part of Witness Collection exemplify artists with classical French training turning their skills to propaganda work.

==== Second Generation: Covering the Vietnam War (1945-1975) ====
After the Geneva Accords were signed in July 1954, Vietnam was divided into the Democratic Republic of Vietnam (DRV, North Vietnam) and the Republic of Vietnam (RVN, South Vietnam). In the period between 1954 and 1975, North Vietnamese war artists produced a multitude of art works aimed at documenting people, locations and events of the Second Indochina War. As cadres of the DRV, they were often given propaganda assignments to support the war effort.

Witness Collection's extensive body of war art made during the Second Indochina War reveals evidence of both documentary and propaganda driven art. The collection contains quick sketches, often made on the front line of battle or under fire, such as those by Trương Hiểu. Conversely, it also hold pieces created with more care and forethought, such as the original, hand-drawn images meticulously crafted as drafts for propaganda posters by artists such as Nguyễn Thanh Minh.

As military personnel, war artists were given largely unfettered access to many areas of Vietnam that would have been inaccessible to others. Second generation art works in the collection reveal details about the lives of Việt Cộng soldiers, including how they ate, where they slept, where and how they traveled, and how they sustained their ammunition, equipment and livelihood in remote regions.

Art materials were scarce during the Second Indochina War. The collection's second generation art works vary in mediums and materials, ranging from canvases made from Cuban sugar sacks to yellow colouring made from crushed malaria tablets. Even so, the collection also holds some of the only photographic records of PAVN and NLF activities by the photographer Lê Minh Trường.

===== Vietnam's Post-Reunification Socialist Realism (1975-1986) =====
After liberation on 30 April 1975, and the following reunification of Vietnam in 1976, many artists once based in North Vietnam decided to migrate south to Saigon. Although many made the move for different personal reasons, one deciding factor similar among artists was the new air of artistic freedom in southern Vietnam.

Witness Collection's third generation art works explore the prevalence of social realism in Vietnam after the country unified. Artist such as Lương Xuân Đoàn - nephew of first generation artist Lương Xuân Nhị - and Nguyễn Xuân Tiệp – son-in-law of Tô Ngọc Vân - continued creating art that reiterated national pride.

The third generation of Witness Collection art works also documents the brief border war with China. Artists such as Phạm Lực were assigned field trips to northern border towns to paint and sketch Vietnamese defensive positions.

==== After Đổi Mới (1986-present) ====
Following the period of đổi mới, or renovation, Vietnam opened its borders to international trade and exchange. Part of this exchange involved the movement of artistic ideas.

Witness Collection features artists such as Lê Quảng Hà, Trương Tân, Nguyễn Văn Cường, Lê Hồng Thái, Nguyễn Thị Châu Giang and Phạm Huy Thông to name a few. This era introduces a period of artistic experimentation where old techniques were utilised for modern subjects, and a form of social criticism previously unseen in Vietnamese art culture was born.

=== Artists ===
Witness Collection Artists Throughout the Generations
First Generation (1920s-1945)	Second Generation (1945–1975)	Third Generation (1975–1986)	Contemporary (1986–present)
Tô Ngọc Vân	Lê Huy Toan	Trương Hiểu	Phạm Huy Thông
Dương Hướng Minh	Lê Lam	Ngô Viễn Chí	Nguyễn Văn Cường
Hoàng Tích Chu	Lê Minh Trường	Phạm Lực	Nguyễn Thị Châu Giang
Lê Quốc Lộc	Nguyễn Thanh Châu	Lương Xuân Đoàn	Lê Hồng Thái
Nguyễn Đức Nùng	Nguyễn Thanh Minh	Nguyễn Xuân Tiệp	Lê Quảng Hà
Nguyễn Hiêm	Nguyễn Thư		Trương Tân
Nguyễn Sỹ Ngọc	Phạm Thanh Tâm		
Nguyễn Văn Tỵ	Quách Văn Phòng		
Trần Đình Thọ	Trần Hữu Chất		
Vẫn Giao	Trần Việt Sơn		
Huỳnh Văn Thuận	Trịnh Kim Vinh		
Nguyễn Quang Phong	Vũ Giáng Hương		
Nguyễn Thế Vinh	Bùi Quang Anh		
Phan Kế An	Nguyễn Đức Thọ		
Tá Ty	Phạm Đỗ Đồng		
Thái Hà	Vỡ Xương		
Vân Đã	Trần Hoàng Sơn		
Xu Man			
Victor Tardieu			
Joseph Inguimberty			
Bùi Xuân Phái			
Trần Văn Cẩn			
Tú Duyên			
Lương Xuân Nhị			
Huỳnh Văn Thuận			

=== Role in Documenting Historical Events ===
==== Anti-Colonial Resistance War ====
Phan Kế An rose to notoriety as an artist for his portraits of Hồ Chí Minh organising the Việt Minh resistance in the Việt Bắc. Phan Kế An was taken to live secretly with Hồ Chí Minh and his closest advisors for a period of three weeks in November 1948. The 20 candid and formal portraits he produced were published in the Sự Thật (The Truth) newspaper.

Huỳnh Văn Thuận worked for the State Bank of Vietnam in 1953 along with artists Lê Phả and Bùi Trang Chước to create the first portraits of Hồ Chí Minh for the country's new banknotes.

==== The Vietnam War ====
A cornerstone of the collection, works by journalist and war artist Phạm Thanh Tâm span not only documentary and propaganda purposes but also generational conflicts. As a soldier in 351 Artillery Regiment, his sketches during the Battle of Điện Biên Phủ provide raw and intimate examples of the historic feats employed by the Việt Minh to ensure victory. In his career as a soldier during the Second Indochina War, his satirical cartoons are examples of North Vietnam's alternative to America's psychological warfare, used to bolster the moral of communist troops while disheartening that of US and South Vietnamese forces.

Quách Văn Phong, founder of the Ho Chi Minh Fine Arts Association, traveled from South Vietnam to North Vietnam at the end of 1954. During his career as an artist for the People's Army of Vietnam (PAVN) he often worked behind enemy lines in high-conflict areas of South Vietnam. At one time, he was assigned to the Tất Thắng newspaper in Military Zone 6, tasked with documenting the actions of units there in conflict with American air force bases and strategic hamlets.

Works by other artists in the collection, such as Bùi Quang Anh, Nguyễn Thành Châu, Nguyễn Thanh Minh, Nguyễn Đức Thọ and Vỡ Xương, to name a few, provide details covering many facets of PAVN and National Liberation Front (NLF) military life: journeying on the Ho Chi Minh Trail; living in the forests and mangrove swamps of NLF-controlled areas in South Vietnam; the contribution rural people and ethnic minority communities made to the war effort in the northern Tây Bắc region; front-line battles and the final moments during the Fall of Saigon.

==== Sino-Vietnamese Conflict ====
As part of the Vietnam Fine Arts University's policy of sending students on assignments for their degree, artists Lương Xuân Đoàn, Nguyễn Xuân Tiệp and Phạm Lực traveled to Vietnam's northern border to document the Sino-Vietnamese war. Based in Bát Xát District, Lào Cai Province, these artists lived with Vietnamese border defence forces. Their sketches and paintings documented ethnic minorities of Vietnam's northern regions and the destruction suffered by towns in Lào Cai Province.

== Conservation ==
In addition to collecting, Witness Collection as an organisation is involved in extensive research into Vietnamese art and art history. Some of its recent projects, including conservation and documentation, are now undertaken in conjunction with Asiarta Foundation, a non-profit foundation.

=== Publications ===
Gillian Osmond, Bettina Ebert and John Drennan, Zinc oxide-centred deterioration in 20th century Vietnamese paintings by Nguyen Trong Kiem (1933-1991), AICCM Bulletin, 2014, Australia.

Bettina Ebert, Brian Singer and Nicky Grimaldi, The Use of Aquazol in the Conservation Treatment of Vietnamese Paintings, Journal of the Institute of Conservation, August 2012, UK.

Bettina Ebert, Sally MacMillan Armstrong, Brian Singer and Nicky Grimaldi, Analysis and Conservation Treatment of Vietnamese Paintings, ICOM-CC 16th Triennial Conference, September 2011, Lisbon, Portugal.

Bettina Ebert and Maria Kubik, Modular Cleaning in Review: An Intensive Workshop at the University of Melbourne, AICCM National Newsletter No. 115, June 2010.

Brian Singer, Sally MacMillan, Nicky Grimaldi and Jean Brown, "Analysis of Vietnamese oil paintings affected by sulphur dioxide pollution", published in Essays on Modern and Contemporary Vietnamese Art.

Sonia Kolesnikov-Jessop, "A Rare Rescue Mission", Newsweek International.

Bettina Ebert, Part I: A report on the condition and conservation treatment of two paintings on canvas (Portrait of the Artist's Wife and Portrait of a Student, 1963) by Vietnamese artist Nguyen Trong Kiem. Part II: A scientific investigation into the degradation processes of zinc-based paints, together with art historical research. MA research project, 2008, Northumbria University, Newcastle, United Kingdom.

Sally MacMillan, A report on the art historical investigation, condition, technical examination and initial investigations into the conservation treatment of two paintings on canvas by Vietnamese artist Nguyen Trong Kiem (1933–1991) dated 1963. MA research project, 2007, Northumbria University, Newcastle, United Kingdom.

== Featured exhibitions ==
1931 - Exposition Coloniale, Paris, France.

1932 - Exhibition of French Painters' Association, Paris, France.

1989 - As Seen by Both Sides, exhibited at 17 museums in the US and 3 museums in Vietnam.

1996 - Paris-Hanoi-Saigon: L'aventure de l'art moderne au Viet Nam, Pavillon des Arts, Paris, France.

2002 - Vietnam Behind the Lines: Images from the War 1965-1975, British Museum, London, UK.

2002 - Another Vietnam: Picture of the War from the Other Side, International Centre of Photography, New York, USA.

2004 - Vietnam Behind the Lines: Images from the War 1965-1975, Hong Kong Museum of Art, Hong Kong.

2005 - Huỳnh Văn Thuận solo exhibition, Ho Chi Minh Fine Arts University Gallery, Ho Chi Minh City, Vietnam.

2005 - Persistent Vestiges: Drawing from the American-Vietnam War, The Drawing Centre, SoHo, New York, USA.

2006 - Il Drago e la Farfalla, Complesso del Vittoriano, Rome, Italy.

2010 - Imprints of Time, Museum of Vietnam Military History, Hanoi, Vietnam.

2010 - Realism in Asia, National Gallery, Singapore; National Museum of Contemporary Art, Korea.

2013 - Du Fleuve Rouge au Mekong, Musee Cernuschi, Paris, France.

2015 - Vietnam 1954-1975, National University of Singapore Museum, Singapore.

2016 - Between Declarations and Dreams: Art of Southeast Asia Since the 19th Century, National Gallery, Singapore.

2016 - Who Wants to Remember a War; and Lines, National University of Singapore Museum, Singapore.

2016 - Hunting Charlie: Finding the Enemy in the Vietnam War, Pritzker Military Museum, Chicago, USA.

2017 - The Vietnam War: 1945-1975, New York Historical Society, USA.

2017 - Fractured, Penang, Malaysia.

2018 - Resistance and Painting, Ho Chi Minh City Fine Arts Museum, Ho Chi Minh City, Vietnam.

2021 - RESIST! The Art of Resistance, Rautenstrauch-Joest Museum, Köln, Germany.

== Featured Media ==
A photograph taken by Lê Minh Trường in 1969 was shown in Ken Burns' PBS series on Vietnam, The Vietnam War, which aired in 2017.

== Loans to Museums and Galleries ==
Witness Collection is planning to tour the collection, alongside a documentary film and a series of books on different facets of Vietnamese art before finally finding a permanent home for the collection.

Previous loans include:

- Phan Kế An (Ho Chi Minh at Work in the Viet Bac, charcoal on paper, 1948), (Hanoi Christmas Bombing of 1972, lacquer on board, 1985), Realism in Asian Art, 2010, The National Gallery Singapore and The National Museum of Contemporary Art, Seoul, South Korea.
- Vỡ Xương (Rejoice on the Day of Liberation of our Homeland, watercolour on paper, 1974), (Paying the Party Fee for the Last Time, powder paint on cardboard, 1974), Realism in Asian Art, 2010, The National Gallery Singapore and The National Museum of Contemporary Art, Seoul, South Korea.
- Trịnh Kim Vinh (Husking and Polishing Rice to Support the Soldiers at the Front, watercolour on silk, c. 1965), Realism in Asian Art, 2010, The National Gallery Singapore and The National Museum of Contemporary Art, Seoul, South Korea.
- Nguyen Van Binh (Vietnam Building a Railway, lacquer on board), Realism in Asian Art, 2010, The National Gallery Singapore and The National Museum of Contemporary Art, Seoul, South Korea.
- Trần Hoàng Sơn (Cultural Activities of Wounded Soldiers, watercolour on paper, 1969), (Mr Boi: The Militiaman Holding the Territory at Phuoc Lanh in Quang Nam Province, watercolour on paper, 1973) Realism in Asian Art, 2010, The National Gallery Singapore and The National Museum of Contemporary Art, Seoul, South Korea.
- Nguyễn Đức Thọ (Tet in Truong Son, watercolour on paper, 1972), (Awaiting Enemy Troops, Xe-pon, tempera on paper, 1971), (New Home, Quang Tri, watercolour on paper, 1972), Between Declarations and Dreams: Art of Southeast Asia Since the 19th Century, 2015, National Gallery Singapore.
- Nguyễn Thanh Châu (Observing, watercolour on paper, 1972), (Towards Saigon, April 1975, watercolour and pastel on paper, 1975), (Let's Go, watercolour on paper, 1972), (Militia Woman, Sam Son, watercolour on paper, 1967), (Crossing Sac Forest, gouache on paper, 1971), Between Declarations and Dreams: Art of Southeast Asia Since the 19th Century, 2015, National Gallery Singapore.
- Trương Hiểu (Charging Soldier, ink on paper, 1972), (Crossing a Monkey Bridge, ink on paper, 1972), (Night March, watercolour with gouache on paper, 1972), (Hiding from the Helicopters, Cu Chi, 1970), (Trung Khanh, Writer, ink on paper, 1969), Between Declarations and Dreams: Art of Southeast Asia Since the 19th Century, 2015, National Gallery Singapore.
- Thái Hà (U Minh Forest, Ca Mau, ink and watercolour on paper, 1966), (U Minh Forest), ink and wash on handmade paper, 1969), (Ca Mau, ink and wash on handmade paper, 1969), (Duong Thi Cam, Guerrilla Fighter, Ca Mau), ink and wash on handmade paper, 1970), Between Declarations and Dreams: Art of Southeast Asia Since the 19th Century, 2015, National Gallery Singapore.
- Huỳnh Văn Thuận, Anti-French Cartoon (1950), RESIST! The Art of Resistance, 2021, Rautenstrauch-Joest Museum, Köln, Germany.
