= Thái Hà =

Vietnamese lacquer artist

- Born: Nguyễn Như Huân; 18 December 1922; Từ Sơn, Bắc Ninh, French Indochina
- Died: 12 October 2005 (aged 82)
- Occupation: Lacquer artist

Nguyễn Như Huân, known later in life and more commonly as Thái Hà (18 December 1922 – 12 October 2005), was a celebrated Vietnamese lacquer artist whose career spanned the First Indochina War and the Second Indochina War.

== Early life ==
Thái Hà was born in Tân Hồng Commune, Từ Sơn district, Bắc Ninh province, a village famous for lacquer painting. He regularly visited local artisans to learn about lacquer techniques. His father was a teacher during French colonial rule.

== Education ==
He started his preparatory studies in Hanoi at the École des Beaux-Arts de l'Indochine in 1940. His principal teacher at the École des Beaux-Arts de l'Indochine was French painter Joseph Inguimberty.

At the start of American bombing against Japanese occupying forces in Vietnam in December 1943, Hà was evacuated along with the École des Beaux-Arts de l'Indochine and his painting class to Sơn Tây, where he continued his studies. In 1944, he joined what was to become the last intake to the diploma art course, where his classmates included Phan Kế An and Dương Bích Liên. At this time, Tô Ngọc Vân became his principal teacher.

== Career ==
Thái Hà returned to Hanoi in March 1945 after the École des Beaux-Arts de l'Indochine closed, and joined the Việt Minh regime in August that same year. After attending a two-month military course, he was assigned as a platoon captain to the Nam Tiến army and sent south to fight French colonial forces. In 1946, harsh conditions in the Hải Vân Pass inflicted his platoon with severe fevers and it was dissolved soon after. However, from this experience, he produced one of his most famous works, The Immense Western Highlands.

After his platoon was disbanded, he was assigned to propaganda activities by the Democratic Republic of Vietnam (DRV) government. In 1950, he was sent to teach art in Military Zone 5, which included the central highland provinces. He was involved in teaching the artist Trương Qua and sculptor Lê Công Thành.

After the Geneva Conference, and due to his contributions to art during the First Indochina War, he was sent to study film art design in the Soviet Union in 1957. On returning to Vietnam in 1959, he took part in the artistic design of the film Chim Khuyên Khuyên (1962), a valuable contribution to Vietnamese national cinema. In the following years, he composed many art works on the Central Highlands, such as The Vast Central Highlands, Logistics of the Central Highlands and Mountain Village.

In 1962, he went to study at the Nguyễn Ái Quốc School – a political institution teaching key communist Party members – and was commissioned to journey south along Ho Chi Minh Trail.

From 1964 until 1975, he was commissioned by the DRV government to set up and manage the liberty art department in South Vietnam. During this time, he lived and worked in South Vietnam's southern provinces, particularly Cà Mau, organising art classes for the National Liberation Front (NLF) and the People's Liberation Armed Forces of South Vietnam (PLAF). He also created many sketches and paintings of the daily lives of villagers and soldiers. Due to the secrecy of this work, it was at this time that he changed his name to Thái Hà.

His works became some of the most widely published images of the Vietnam War by North Vietnamese artists, alongside others such as Huỳnh Phương Đông, Trang Phượng and Nguyễn Thanh Châu.

In 1968, he travelled from Cà Mau into Cambodia and then back into Vietnam via the Tây Ninh border. He held an exhibition in Cambodia before returning to the base in Củ Chi. He once stayed at the consulate of the South Vietnam liberty frontier, where he held an exhibition of paintings from the war. When seeing photos of the exhibition, President Hồ Chí Minh was so pleased he ordered to hold the exhibition again in Hanoi. The authorities constantly promoted the exhibition in the media, and it was considered a great event at the time.

As a specialist in lacquer painting and coromandel, he created many small lacquer works that were given to foreign delegations as gifts by diplomats in Hanoi between 1971 and 1975. After the war ended, he became deputy head of the Ho Chi Minh City Fine Arts Association and a full-time artist after 1999. He is widely recognised as one of Vietnam's most talented coromandel (engraved lacquer) artists.

== Notable works ==
- The Immense Western Highlands
- The Vast Central Highlands
- Logistics of the Central Highlands
- Mountain Village
- The West Highland House
- Dam San
- U Minh Forest
- Guerrilla in the South

== Collections ==
- Vietnam Fine Arts Museum, Hanoi
- State Museum of Oriental Art, Moscow
- Witness Collection

== Official roles ==
- Head of the Painting Department in Military Zone 5, 1951–1954.
- Member of the Vietnam Fine Arts Association, 1957.
- Head of the Art Design Department, Vietnam Feature Film Studio, 1960–1962
- Director General of Fine Arts Department for the Provisional Revolutionary Government of South Vietnam, 1963–1974
- Deputy Chief of the Ho Chi Minh Fine Arts Association, 1975
- Member of the executive board of the Vietnam Fine Arts Association, 1957–1983 (supplemented in 1980)

== Awards ==
- Order of Resistance Medal
- First Class Anti-American Resistance Medal
- Medal for the Literary and Artistic Development of Vietnam
- 50 Years of Membership of the Vietnamese Communist Party Badge
- National Fine Arts Prize, 1960
- State Prize for Literature and Arts, 2001
