= Phan Kế An =

Vietnamese painter (1923–2018)

- Phan Kế An in his studio, Hanoi, 2006
- Born: Phan Kế An; March 20, 1923
- Died: January 21, 2018 (aged 94); Hanoi
- Other name: Phan Kích
- Education: École Supérieure des Beaux Arts de l’Indochine
- Occupation: Artist

Phan Kế An (20 March 1923 – 21 January 2018), also known under the pseudonym Phan Kích, was a Vietnamese painter and renowned lacquer artist. He was the son of Phan Kế Toại (1892–1973) who was the personal envoy to Tonkin of the last Emperor of Vietnam, Bảo Đại, the Minister of Home Affairs (1945–1955) and former deputy prime minister of North Vietnam from 1955 to 1973.

== Early life and career ==
Phan Kế An studied at Bưởi school under famous teachers such as Lê Thị Lựu, Tô Ngọc Vân, and Nguyễn Tường Lân. He enrolled into the École des Beaux Arts de l'Indochine in 1944, but then joined the Việt Minh guerrillas before graduating along with many other artists from his class. He was tasked with drawing anti-colonial caricatures on walls in French occupied territory.

In 1947, at 24 years-old, he was asked by General Secretary, Trường Chinh, to join Sự Thật newspaper (the predecessor of Nhân Dân newspaper). In his role as commissioning editor, An drew political cartoons aimed at French, and later American, imperialism, as well as Ngô Đình Diệm's Republic of Vietnam government. He continued painting throughout the Vietnam War to criticize the American bombing of Hanoi.

Hồ Chí Minh at Work in the Việt Bắc, charcoal on paper, 27 November 1948

In November 1948 he spent 3 weeks with Hồ Chí Minh and his advisers in the Việt Bắc, producing 20 portraits, which were later published in the Sự Thật (The Truth) newspaper. An used many improvised materials to create these sketches and portraits, including the burnt ends of cigarette butts. He used charcoal to sketch Hồ Chí Minh at Work in the Việt Bắc. He was the first artist to depict Hồ Chí Minh during the First Indochina War. According to An, early works of communist leaders and soldiers were created to show support of the Việt Minh revolution, and risked severe punishment, even execution, if caught by French officials.

In the winter of 1950, as a special envoy for the Việt Minh, his painting Remembering the Northwest/Remember One the Northwest (Nhớ Một Chiều Tây Bắc), quickly established him as a renowned lacquer artist. The image was later immortalized by poet Đoàn Việt Bắc in his poem of the same name and was later accompanied by music from the composer Vũ Thành.

Phan Kế An's art works were part of the Realism in Asian Art exhibition co-organized by The National Art Gallery, Singapore and at the National Museum of Contemporary Art, Korea in 2010.

He died at the age of 94 on 21 January 2018 in Hanoi.

== Collections ==
Phan Kế An's works are part of a number of Vietnamese and international collections:

- Vietnam Fine Art Museum, Hanoi, Vietnam
- Ho Chi Minh Fine Arts Museum, Ho Chi Minh City, Vietnam
- State Museum of Oriental Art, Moscow, Russia
- Witness Collection, Penang, Malaysia

== Official roles ==
During his career, An held a number of official positions:

- Member of the Central Art Committee, 1951–1957
- Member of the Vietnam Fine Arts Association, 1957
- Deputy General Secretary of the Vietnam Fine Arts Association, 1958–1978
- Member of Executive Committee of the Vietnam Fine Arts Association, 1957–1983.
- Member of the executive board, Member of the Professional Committee, Chairman of the Artistic Council of Graphic Design II Vietnam Association of Fine Arts, 1983–1989
- Member of the Vietnam Fine Arts Association Examination Board III, 1989–1994

== Notable works ==
- Trời giông trên thành Thanh Hoá (Thunderstorm Looms over Thanh Hoá Citadel). First prize in the first National Fine Art Exhibition in Hanoi in 1946
- Hồ Chí Minh at Work in the Việt Bắc, 1948
- Nhớ Một Chiều Tây Bắc (Remembering the Northwest/Remember One the Northwest), 1950
- Hanoi Christmas Bombing of 1972, Hanoi, 1975-1985

== Awards ==
- Third Class Independence Medal
- Second-Class Resistance Medal
- Anti-American Resistance Medal First Class
- Arts Devotion medal
- Medal for the cause of Vietnamese art
- Medal for the People's cause
- State Awards for Literature and Arts, 2001

== See also ==
- École des Beaux Arts de l'Indochine
- Việt Minh
- Hồ Chí Minh
- Vietnamese Art
