= Nam Sơn (painter) =

Vietnamese painter

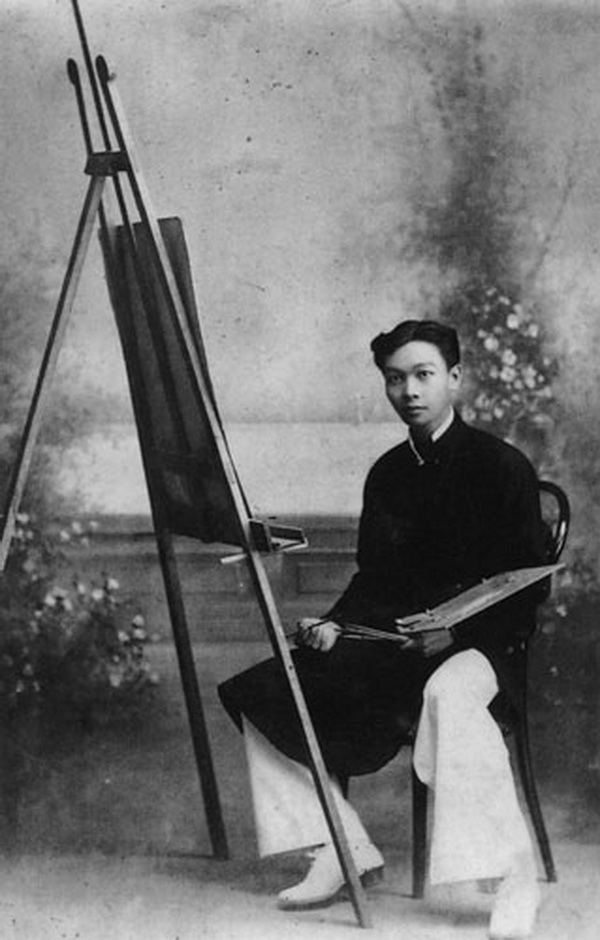
Photo of painter Nam Sơn in 1919

Nguyễn Nam Sơn, real name Nguyễn Vạn Thọ (1890–1973) was a Vietnamese painter who taught at the École des Beaux-Arts de l’Indochine in Hanoi from 1927 to 1945. He was initially appointed as an assistant to Victor Tardieu, the founder of the school, on February 18, 1925.

== Works ==
Many of his works are in the Vietnam National Museum of Fine Arts, Hanoi:
