= Phạm Thanh Tâm =

Vietnamese journalist and war artist (1932–2019)

- Born: 15 May 1932; Nam Định Province, Vietnam
- Died: 30 May 2019 (aged 87); Ho Chi Minh City, Vietnam
- Education: Vietnam Fine Arts College
- Known for: Journalism, writing, sketching, painting, propaganda, documentation
- Style: Realism/documentary
- Movement: École des Beaux-Arts de l'Indochine Influenced

Phạm Thanh Tâm (Note: In this Vietnamese name, the surname is Phạm, but is often simplified to Pham in English-language text. In accordance with Vietnamese custom, this person should be referred to by the given name, Tâm.) (15 May 1932 – 30 May 2019) was a Vietnamese journalist and war artist, who used the pen name Huỳnh Biếc. His career spanned the First Indochina War as a Việt Minh soldier participating in the resistance against French colonialism, as well as the Second Indochina War (Note: More commonly known in the West as the Vietnam War) as a member of the People's Army of Vietnam against South Vietnam and the United States.

== Early life ==
Tâm was born in Vĩnh Hảo, Vinh Lại, Vụ Bản district, Nam Định Province – northern Hải Phòng – into a family with a tradition of revolutionary activities. In 1941, his father and mother both joined the Việt Minh resistance against French colonialism.

== Education ==
Tâm began his education as a primary school student in Hải Phòng. After evacuating the city in late-1946, he attended a six-month painting training course organized by the Art Division of Military Zone III held at Phù Lưu Chanh communal house, near Đầu market, in Bắc Ninh. His teachers included artists involved in the anti-colonial resistance, including Lương Xuân Nhị, Mai Văn Nam and Bùi Xuân Phái.

Later, in 1963, Tâm enrolled in the Vietnam Fine Arts College (Note: Also known as the Hanoi Fine Arts College). He graduated the Vietnam Fine Arts College in 1967.

== Career ==
=== First Indochina War ===
After his studies at the painting training course in Military Zone III, Tâm was assigned to the Culture and Information Office in Hưng Yên Province.

In 1950, Tâm joined the Việt Minh as a journalist and war artist. His initial assignment was to the 34th Regiment's Tất Thắng newspaper. He was soon transferred to Artillery Division 351 to work for the division newspaper, Quyết Thắng.

In 1952, along with his division, Tâm was sent to China for artillery training. After returning to Vietnam, he and his division marched from the town of Lào Cai on Vietnam's northern border with China to Điện Biên Phủ, a journey of over 300 kilometres on foot. He arrived on 11 March 1954, two days before the decisive Battle of Điện Biên Phủ, which he participated in as a soldier and documented as an artist and journalist.

=== Second Indochina War ===
From 1954 to 1963, Tâm worked for three newspapers concurrently: the Military Art Newspaper, (Note: Vietnamese: Văn Nghệ Quân Đội) the People's Army Newspaper (Quân Đội Nhân Dân) and the Military Image Newspaper (Hình Ảnh Quân Đội).

During his education at the Vietnam Fine Arts College, he volunteered for the front during the Second Indochina War. Again as a journalist, he was granted permission to write and paint from the battlefields along the Ho Chi Minh trail; in Khe Sanh, Quảng Trị and Hạ Long Bay; during the 1972 Christmas Bombings; in Đà Nắng and during the Fall of Saigon.

Although artists worked under difficult conditions and with limited resources, Tâm managed to preserve most of his sketches and paintings by sending them back to Hanoi for safe keeping, using a variety of materials and the occasional use of photographs. He revealed to Sherry Buchanan of The Guardian "At Khe Sanh I did the watercolours right there at the battle. I used a plume rehaussée d'aquarelle [pen with watercolour]. The idea was not to hang around too long in one place. So I would usually add the pen later on. When I traveled around the country and there was no fierce fighting, I had more time to sketch carefully. I traveled with a photographer. That was very useful. If I forgot details, I could look at his pictures and fill in details. I used all kinds of materials: watercolours, pens, pencils – whatever I could find.".

=== After Reunification ===
In 1978, Tâm was appointed the director of the Military Fine Arts Workshop (later merged into the Military Museum) and staged painting exhibitions, taught art courses and erected statues to commemorate the reunification of Vietnam.

He retired from the army as a Colonel and moved to Ho Chi Minh City with his family in 1989.

Tâm died in Ho Chi Minh City on 30 May 2019.

== Works ==
Art Works

- Spring in the Điện Biên Phủ Artillery Tunnel
- Road to Điện Biên in the Past
- Landscape on Điện Biên Phủ Stilt House
- Saigon Gateway on 30 April 1975
- Deep in Trường Sơn Forest
- In the Past, Quảng Trị
- Baby Mường Pồn

=== Books ===
- Phạm Thanh Tâm, Drawing Under Enemy Fire: War diary of a young Vietnamese artist, 2005, Asia Ink, London ISBN 978-0953783939
- Phạm Thanh Tâm, Carnet de guerre d'un jeune Viêt-Minh à Diên Biên Phu (War diary of a young Viêt-Minh in Diên Biên Phu), 2011, Armand Colin, Paris ISBN 978-2200257590
- Phạm Thanh Tâm, Trang Sử Vàng Điện Biên Phủ (History Of Dien Bien Phu Victory), 2014, Nhà Xuất bản Thời Đại (Thời Đại Publishing House)
- Phạm Thanh Tâm, Tiến về Sài Gòn (Going to Saigon), Nhà Xuất Bản Trẻ (Young Publishers) ISBN 978-6049423437
- Phạm Thanh Tâm, Dung Dăng Dung Dẻ, Nhà Xuất Bản Trẻ (Young Publishers)
- Phạm Thanh Tâm, Vượt Ngầm (Breaking Down), Nhà Xuất Bản Trẻ (Young Publishers)
- Phạm Thanh Tâm, Ngày về Sài Gòn (Return to Saigon), Nhà Xuất Bản Văn Hóa-Văn Nghệ (Cultural-Arts Publishing House)
- Phạm Thanh Tâm, Đường 9, Khe Sanh: Tránh, Ký Họa Kháng Chiến Chống Mỹ (Route 9, Khe Sanh: Avoid, Sketch Anti-American Resistance) 2012, Nhà Xuất Bản Trẻ (Young Publishers) OCLC 857863995, LCCN 2013-350686

== Collections ==
Phạm Thanh Tâm's wartime works are collected by numerous museums in Vietnam, as well as a number of international collections.

- British Museum
- Dogma Collection
- Ho Chi Minh City Museum of Fine Arts
- Logistics Museum
- Military Zone 9 Museum
- Southeastern Armed Forces Military Zone 7 Museum
- Vietnam Fine Arts Museum
- Vietnam Military History Museum
- War Remnants Museum
- Witness Collection

== Official Roles ==
- Founding member of the Vietnam Fine Arts Association, 1957
- Founding member of the Vietnam Journalists Association, 1957
- Director of the Workshop on Fine Arts of the Armed Forces, 1978-1989
- Colonel in the People's Army of Vietnam, 1989
- Member of the Ho Chi Minh City Fine Art Association
- Member of the executive committee of the Vietnamese Plastic Art Association
- Member of the Vietnam Veterans Association

== Awards ==
- Third prize at the National Art Exhibition, 1954
- First Class Resistance Order
- Third Class Military Exploit Order

== See also ==
- Vietnam University of Fine Arts
- People's Army of Vietnam
- Việt Minh
- First Indochina War
- Vietnam War
