= Văn Đen =

Vietnamese painter

Dương Văn Đen (21 October 1919 – 1988) was a Vietnamese painter. Văn Đen was born in Cần Thơ and many of his works feature rural subjects and areas reminiscent of his childhood in South Vietnam. He did not study at the École des Beaux-Arts de l'Indochine but in France from 1950 to 1953, after which he returned to Vietnam and was considered part of the EBAI tradition. He was also a member of the Young Vietnamese Artists Association.

Văn Đen painted using an impressionistic style and was considered to be a bridge between conventional and more liberal styles of art. In 1960, he won a gold medal in the 1960 Spring Award of Painting content for Two Medical Pots.
