= Tú Duyên =

Vietnamese painter (1915–2012)

Nguyễn Văn Duyến
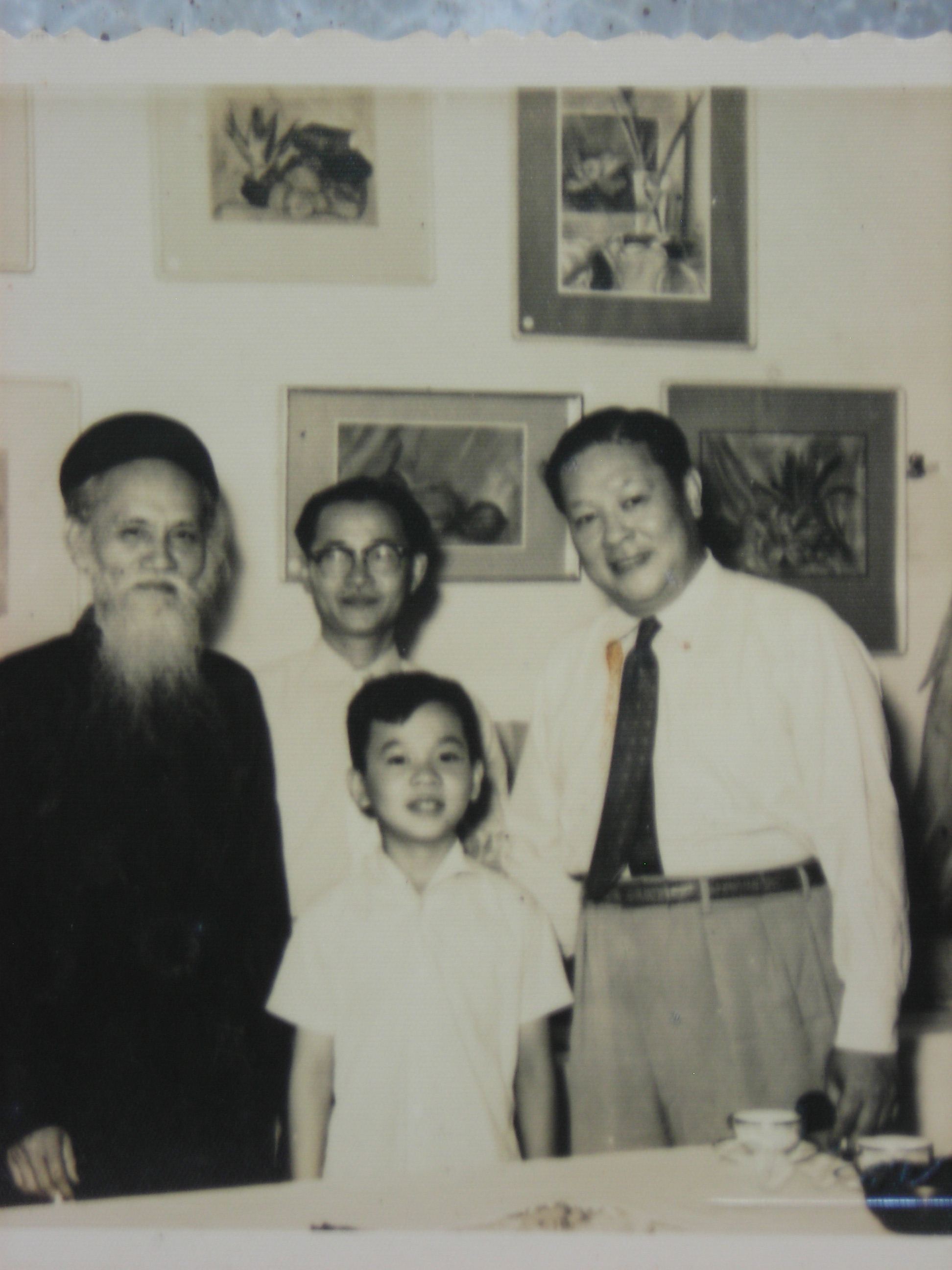
- Family from left to right: Á Nam Trần Tuấn Khải (famous poet), Tú Duyên, Đào Sĩ Chu. This photo is from ĐSChu's family collection.
- Born: 20 December 1915; Bát Tràng, Bắc Ninh, Vietnam
- Died: May 3, 2012; At his home

Nguyễn Văn Duyến, art name Tú Duyên (20 December 1915, in Bát Tràng, Bắc Ninh – May 3, 2012) was a Vietnamese painter.

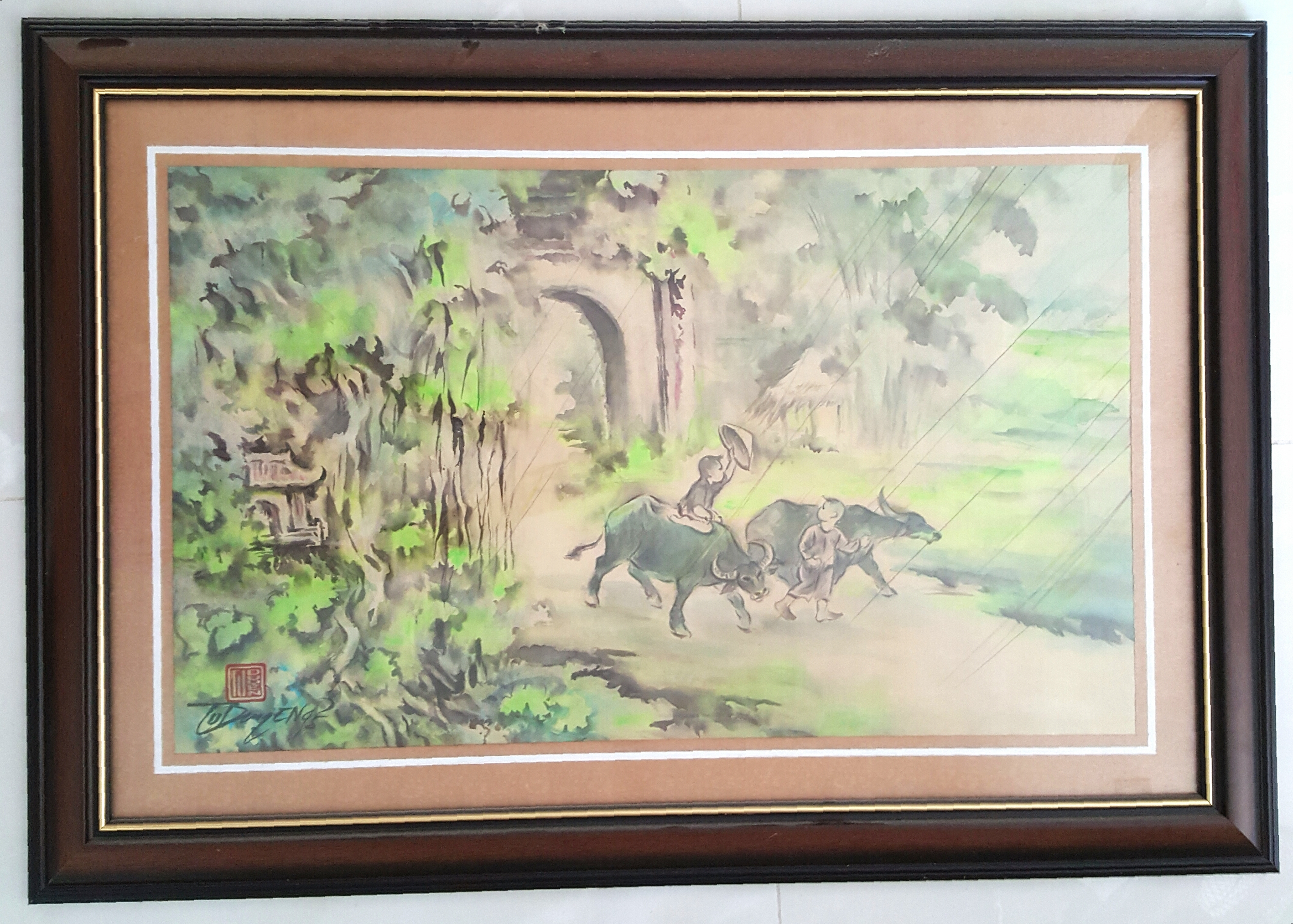
Tú Duyên's silk painting Photo from my niece Hạnh family collection.jpg

Nguyễn Văn Duyến was born in the pottery village of Bát Tràng near Hanoi. He first was a private student of Nam Sơn, then a student at the École des Beaux-Arts de l'Indochine from 1935-1942.

Duyên moved to Saigon in 1942, making silk and paper Đông Hồ folk prints from finger-painted woodblocks. His work is considered as having given new dimensions to traditional thủ ấn họa hand stamp paintings. He submitted some of his prints to Saigon's newspapers and his illustrations began to feature in newspapers from the late 1940s. His paintings drew subjects from literary work such as Truyện Kiều, the Chinh phụ ngâm of the poet Đặng Trần Côn, and popular folklore. He had also drawn Vietnamese kings and other notable historical figures. The Ho Chi Minh City Museum of Fine Arts currently exhibits his work including nine paintings on canvas and 52 wood carving plaques
