= Trương Tân =

Vietnamese painter (born 1963)

Trương Tân (Hanoi, 1963) is a Vietnamese painter. He graduated from Hanoi University of Fine Arts in 1991. His work is known for sexual and anti-traditional family values messages, leading to some of them to have been confiscated or refused public viewings. The black-and-white graffiti style of his earlier work was associated with that of his slightly younger contemporary the woman painter Đinh Ý Nhi.
