= Nguyễn Ðức Thọ =

Nguyễn Ðức Thọ (20 September 1945) is a Vietnamese artist who was a North Vietnamese war artist whose career spanned the Second Indochina War (also known as the Vietnam War). He was born in Hà Nam Province into a family with strong ties to the revolution against French colonialism. His mother and father donated fabric and bicycles to the Việt Minh.

After studying the intermediate art course at the Vietnam Fine Arts College, he joined the People's Army of Vietnam (PAVN) in May 1965 during the heightened American bombing campaign of Operation Linebacker. First serving as a regular soldier in a missile unit, he was later sent to the Soviet Union for training and education on missile systems as a soldier and engineer.

He became a war artist after his unit recognized his talent for art, and due to the army's natural demand for art. He was in charge of making banners, decorating meeting halls and drawing propaganda posters for his unit. However, he also made images for purely documentary purposes. His paintings were shown in many divisional exhibitions and published in Quân Đội Nhân Dân (‘People’s Army’ newspaper).

Many of his images involved scenes of anti-aircraft defenses. He was able to draw in many famous locations, including the Ho Chi Minh Trail, Highway 9, Khe Sanh, the Second Battle of Quảng Trị and eventually in Saigon in 1975 during and after liberation.

He graduated from the Vietnam Fine Arts College in 1976. In the same year, his painting Evening on the Red River was given to the Cuban government.

He remained in the PAVN until 1990, working with them to reorganize museums and art exhibitions. He also painted from his recollections of the Vietnam War and his work was included in many exhibitions throughout Vietnam.

== Notable works ==
- Evening on the Red River (1974)
- Pitted (1985)
- Wish Uncle Ho (1995)
- The Focus On the Trail (2000)
- Ba Đình One Morning in May

== Collections ==
- Vietnam National Fine Arts Museum
- Ho Chi Minh City Museum or Fine Arts
- Ho Chi Minh City Fine Arts Association
- The British Museum
- Witness Collection (Cuban Government)
