= Huỳnh Văn Gấm =

Vietnamese painter

- Born: 1922; Bình Lập, Châu Thành, Tân An
- Died: 1987 (aged 64–65); Ho Chi Minh City
- Occupation: Painter, Politician

Huỳnh Văn Gấm (1922–1987) was a Vietnamese painter.

== Education ==
Huỳnh Văn Gấm attended Indochina Fine Arts College, the same course as many students who later became famous Vietnamese painters such as Bùi Xuân Phái, Nguyễn Tư Nghiêm, Tạ Thúc Bình.

== Career ==
In 1944, with only one year left to graduate from the Indochina Fine Arts College, Huỳnh Văn Gấm withdrew from school. He returned to his homeland to secretly join the revolution. When the August revolution was successful, Huỳnh Văn Gấm was elected as a member of the Provincial Party Committee at only 23 years old. In 1946, after the national general election, Huỳnh Văn Gấm was elected a member of the National Assembly.

== Works ==
Many of his works are in the Vietnam National Museum of Fine Arts, Hanoi. Huỳnh Văn Gấm did not paint much for he painted carefully, often not satisfied with the work. His works mostly reflect on war and revolution topics.

- The Heart and the Gun-barrel (Trái tim và nòng súng), 1963 (Huỳnh Văn Gấm).
- Miss Lien (Cô Liên), 1962 (Huỳnh Văn Gấm).
- Cochinchina Uprising (Nam kỳ khởi nghĩa), 1940 (Huỳnh Văn Gấm).

== Awards ==
- Ho Chi Minh Prize for Literature and Art (1990)
