= Nguyen Van Ty =

Nguyen Van Ty may refer to:

- Nguyễn Văn Tỵ (1917–1992), Vietnamese painter
- Nguyễn Văn Tý (1925–2019), Vietnamese composer
- Nguyễn Văn Tý (swimmer), in Short course swimming at the 2009 Asian Indoor Games
- Louise Nguyẽ̂n Văn Tỵ (1915-?), Vietnamese composer
