= Alix Aymé =

French painter

Alix Angèle Marguerite Aymé (1894–1989) was a female French painter who lived in China and Vietnam.

== Life ==
Born Alix Angèle Marguerite Hava in Marseille, she first married in 1920 Professor Paul de Fautereau-Vassel, moving with him to Shanghai in China and then to Hanoi, Vietnam. In 1925–26 she taught drawing at the French Lycée in Hanoi. (Note: This is distinct from the École des Beaux-Arts de l'Indochine (EBAI) founded by Victor Tardieu in the same year.)

The couple returned to France, where they lived from 1926 to 1928 and had a son. Then she separated from Fautereau-Vassel and returned with her infant son to Indochina. In 1931 she remarried to Colonel, later General, Georges Aymé, (Note: "Surnommé « Nimbus » par son état-major, Mordant ne s'entendait guère avec Decoux. Le gouverneur le garde en Indochine et désigne à son poste le général Aymé, chef de la division du Tonkin. Personnalité brillante et impulsive, Aymé était d'ailleurs le principal collaborateur de Mordant à la tête de la résistance") future deputy to Lieutenant-General fr:Eugène Mordant, in command of the French Army in Indochina, and whose younger brother Marcel Aymé would later be known as a novelist. She travelled and painted also in Laos, becoming acquainted with the household of King Sisavang Vong, and her large frescos were displayed in the Royal Palace, Luang Prabang. She became teacher at EBAI where she contributed to a reawakening of interest in lacquer painting.

An exhibition of her work was held at the Johns Hopkins University in 2012 who described her as "an influential participant in the promotion of Paris-born modernism in the era between the world wars." The exhibition documented the artist's development over nearly four decades, from early works influenced by the Nabi painter Maurice Denis, to later adoption of Asian elements and modernism in her mature landscapes.
