= Nguyễn Thanh Châu =

Vietnamese war artist

Nguyễn Thanh Châu (4 January 1939-20 April 2012) was a Vietnamese war artist whose career documented the Second Indochina War.

He was born in Tịnh Thới village, Cao Lãnh Province (now known as Đồng Tháp Province) in the Mekong Delta. He joined the Việt Minh in 1953 to fight in the Anti-colonial Resistance War against the French. After the end of the First Indochina War he moved north with his family to Hanoi and enrolled in the oil painting intermediary course at the Vietnam Fine Arts College under director Trần Văn Cẩn from 1956 to 1959.

In 1960, he was sent to the Soviet Union to study watercolour painting at the All-Ukrainian Art Institute in Kiev, which provided the basic skills behind much of his future work. After Kiev, he studied in Moscow with his contemporary Lê Lam, before returning to Vietnam in 1964.

He joined the People's Army of Vietnam (PAVN) in 1966. After a nine month journey down the Ho Chi Minh Trail, through Laos and Cambodia, Châu arrived in the south, in Tây Ninh Province. He spent most of the remaining years of the war in the area of the Mekong Delta's Plain of Reeds (Đồng Tháp Mười). He familiarised himself with speed sketching while on the move, which he then developed with watercolours once he returned to the resistance military base in Tây Ninh.

He witnessed battles in places such as on the Tiền River, on Black Virgin Mountain (Núi Bà Đen) and near the tunnels of Củ Chi before his advance with the army on its final assault on Saigon in April 1975.

After the war, he held positions as Deputy Secretary General of the Vietnam Fine Arts Association and Secretary General of the Ho Chi Minh City Fine Arts Association before retiring to a quiet riverside village suburb in Ho Chi Minh City.

== Awards ==
- First prize at the National Fine Arts Exhibition, 1976
- First prize at the National Fine Arts Exhibition, 1980
- Second Prize at the National Fine Arts Exhibition, 1980
- Second Prize at the National Fine Arts Exhibition, 1990
- First Prize Ho Chi Minh City Fine Arts Exhibition, 1990
- Medal for Fine Arts Career
- First Rank Labour Medal
