= Nhân Dân =

Vietnamese state newspaper

- The central organ of the Communist Party of Vietnam and the voice of the Party, State and People of Vietnam

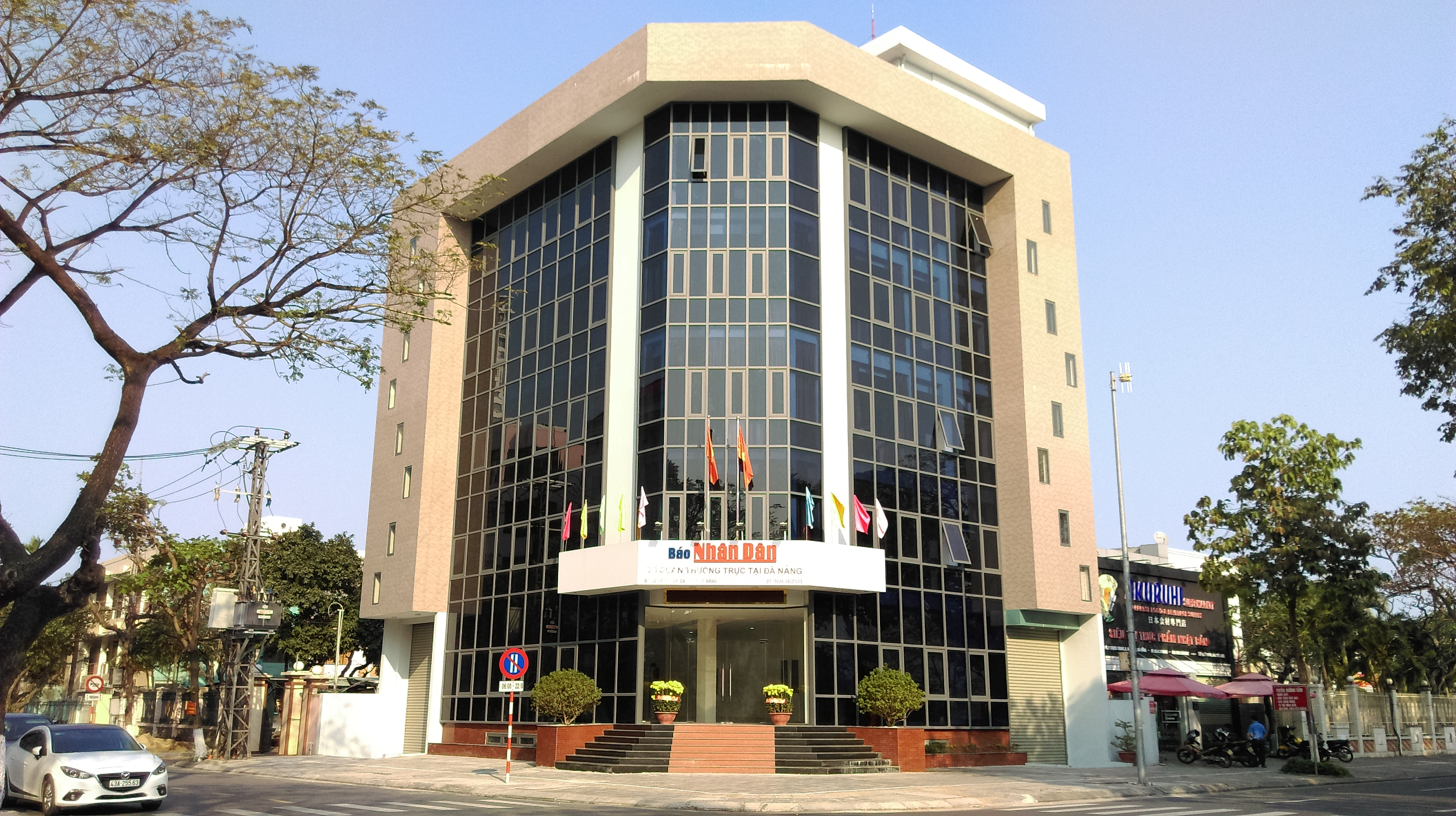
- Nhân Dân office in Da Nang
- Type: Daily Newspaper
- Format: Print, online
- School: Nhân Dân cuối tuần
- Owner: Communist Party of Vietnam
- Editor-in-chief: Lê Quốc Minh
- Founded: 11 March 1951; 75 years ago
- Political alignment: Ho Chi Minh Thought; Socialist-oriented market economy
- Language: Vietnamese and others
- Headquarters: 71 Hàng Trống Street, Hoàn Kiếm District, Hanoi
- Country: Vietnam
- Website: nhandan.vn (Vietnamese); en.nhandan.vn (English)

Nhân Dân (lit. 'People', Vietnamese pronunciation: [ɲʌ̄n zʌ̄n]; French: Le journal Nhân Dân, Chinese: 人民报, Russian: Газета «Нянзан», Spanish: El periódico Nhan Dan) is the official newspaper of the Communist Party of Vietnam. According to the newspaper, it is "the voice of the Party, the State and the people of Vietnam."

It has a daily circulation of 180,000 copies. Its weekend edition, Nhân Dân cuối tuần (literal translation: The People Weekend), has a circulation of 110,000 copies, and its monthly magazine has a circulation of 130,000 copies. It has an online edition that was started on June 21, 1998.

The newspaper was first published on March 11, 1951. Its predecessor was Sự Thật ("Truth") newspaper, which was set up in the 1940s. Many important figures in the Vietnamese Communist Party worked at Nhân Dân. Trường Chinh and Tố Hữu were editors in chief of the newspaper. Painter Phan Kế An was a regular contributor during the First Indochina War in particular, after he was asked to join the newspaper by Trường Chinh.

The current Editor-in-Chief of Nhân Dân is Lê Quốc Minh.

== History ==
Newspaper and official name of the Party by time
Newspaper	Time	Party's name
Cờ Giải phóng "Liberation Flag"	10 October 1942 – 17 July 1945; 12 September 1945 – 18 November 1945	Indochinese Communist Party
Sự Thật "Truth"	5 December 1945 – 21 December 1950	Institute for Studying Marxism in Indochina
Nhân Dân "The People"	11 March 1951 – present	Worker's Party of Vietnam; Communist Party of Vietnam

== Awards ==
Nhân Dân was awarded the First Class Independence Order on March 9, 2016.
