= Nguyễn Tường Lân =

Vietnamese painter

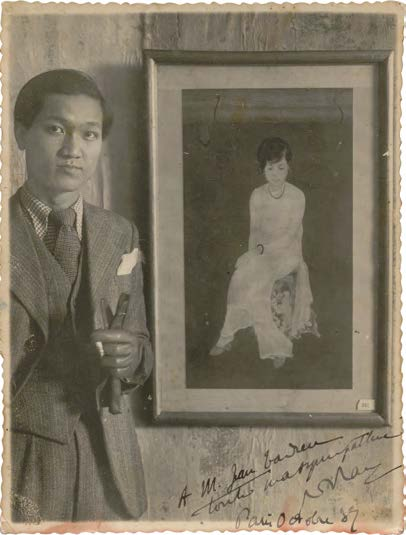
- Born: 1906; French Indochina
- Died: 1946 (aged 39–40)
- Occupation: Painter

Nguyễn Tường Lân (阮祥麟, 1906–1946) was a Vietnamese painter, known as one of the Four Masters of Vietnamese modern art with a career that evolved from modern pieces into more abstract works.

== Life ==
Nguyen Tuong Lan studied in the fourth class of the Vietnam University of Fine Arts (then known as the Indochina College of Fine Arts). Following graduation, he opened a painting studio in Hanoi, which became known for the adequacy of its facilities and the beauty of its models. Nguyen Tuong Lan created many works using his wide-ranging proficiency in materials including oil paint, lacquer, silk, wood carving, pigments, and charcoal, but few of his works survive.

== Works ==
Many of his works are in the Vietnam National Museum of Fine Arts, Hanoi:

== Gallery ==
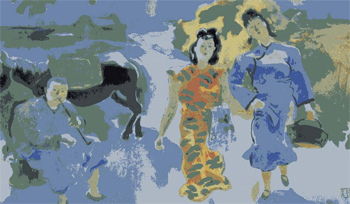
Mountain Market

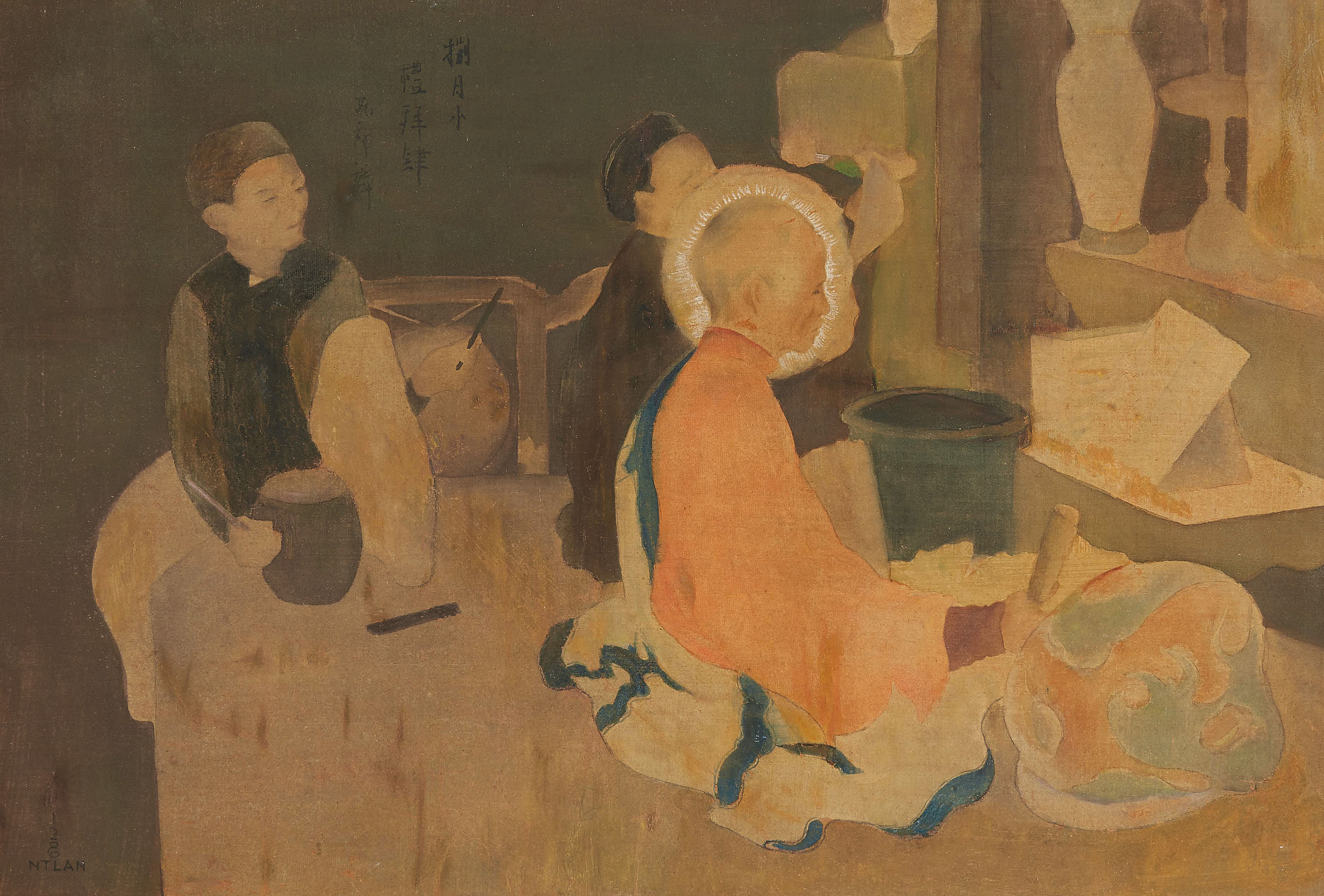
A La Pagode
