= Vũ Cao Đàm =

Vietnamese Painter

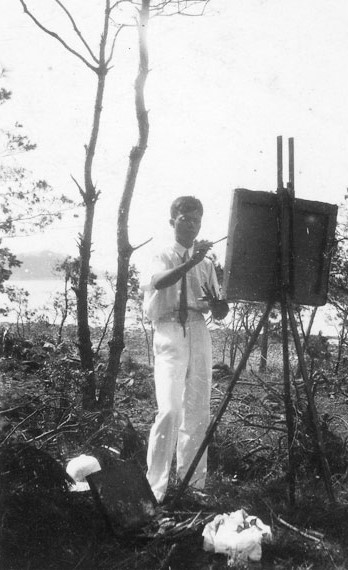
Vũ Cao Đàm painting on easel in the countryside of Hanoi, circa 1926-27.

Vũ Cao Đàm (1908-2000) was a Vietnamese painter. He was one of the alumni of Victor Tardieu's École des Beaux-Arts de l’Indochine in Hanoi in the 1930s, along with Mai Trung Thứ, Lê Phổ and woman painter Lê Thị Lựu, to emigrate to France and make a career in Paris.

== Biography ==
=== Childhood ===
Vu Cao Dam, was born January 8, 1908, in Hanoi, the son of Vu Dinh Thi and Pham Thi Cuc. He was the 5th of 14 children of whom 9 reached adulthood. The family came from Trinh Xuyen (today Lien Bai) district of Vu Ban, province of Nam Dinh.Hanoi, Vietnam. A member of a large Catholic family, the artist was the fifth of fourteen children. His father Vu Dinh Thi (1864-1930) 4th of 5 children, was born in a family converted to Catholicism since the 18th century. The family situation being satisfactory, Vu Cao Dam’s father went to school at a very tender age and since early childhood became proficient at Chinese calligraphy. He also studied Latin, French and Spanish, but had a true veneration for Confucius and a great love and knowledge of Chinese literature. At the time, he was one of the few Vietnamese who perfectly mastered the French language and for that reason was sent to Paris by the Government at the occasion of the Universal Exhibition in 1889. He was conquered by French people’s kind and elegant manners and kept wonderful memories of his stay. Later on, he tried to convey to his children his admiration and taste for French Culture. At the age of 30 he married Pham Thi Cuc (1877-1931) then aged 17, also a Catholic. He was what French people used to call “un lettré”. He founded and directed all his life the School of Interpreters of Hanoi, which formed the Mandarins for the colonial Regime.

=== Education ===
In 1926 Vu Cao Dam entered the École des Beaux-Arts of Hanoi. From 1925 to 1945, according to the year, some eight to ten candidates were admitted on the 60 to 100 who applied for the selection. There he took drawing, painting and sculpture classes. During the five years his studies lasted, Victor Tardieu, founder of the school, never ceased to encourage him. His main teachers were: Victor Tardieu for painting, Joseph Inguimberty for decoration, Batteur for architecture, Dr Phénix for anatomy, and Goloubew for medicine. Every year a professor of painting or drawing, who held the title of the Indochina Prize, came to teach at the Academy of Fine Arts. Victor Tardieu dedicated himself totally to his beloved school. Not only did he teach painting and the means to succeed in that field, but he wanted to insure for his pupils the best possible material conditions so they could accomplish their work in utmost serenity.

As one of two students in a brand new sculpture department, Vu Cao Dam excelled in modeling busts. Over the course of the five-year program, the emerging artist created numerous bronze pieces including: Tête de Jeune Fille, 1927; Young Peasant Girl, 1927; a bust of his father, Vu Dinh Thi, 1927; Rooster, 1927; Bust of Victor Tardieu, 1928; and Head of a Man with a Mandarin Hat, 1930. The bronze bust of Victor Tardieu was later donated to the Ecole des Beaux Arts d’Indochine by the Tardieu family.

Upon graduating from the fine arts school in 1931, Cao Dam received a scholarship that sent him to France to continue his studies. This journey to France would be a significant turning point in his life, as Vu Cao Dam would never return to his homeland of Vietnam. Vu Cao Dam settled at the Cite Universitaire in Paris, and was soon invited to participate in the 1931 Exposition Coloniale Internationale at the Angkor Wat Pavilion by its art director, his old mentor Victor Tardieu. He then enrolled in the Far East section of the Ecole du Louvre. Within the walls of the great museum other galleries scattered around Paris, Vu Cao Dam was able to view and study the great European masterpieces. He made great discoveries in the works of Renoir, Van Gogh, Bonnard, and Matisse, as well as the sculptural creations of Rodin, Despiau and Giacometti. As a young artist in his formative years, the art of Paris was a fantastic source of learning and inspiration. Impressionist and Post-Impressionist elements would always find their way into Vu Cao Dam’s future creations.

=== War years ===
When World War II broke out, Vu Cao Dam was forced to interrupt his work in bronze casting, as all metal was claimed by the German army occupying France. As a result, the artist turned his concentration to other mediums and produced some of his finest paintings during the war period. By 1946 the artist was becoming increasingly well-known and appreciated in Parisian art circles. That same year Ho Chi Minh, President of the newly declared Democratic Republic of Vietnam, arrived in Paris. Vu Cao Dam met with the Vietnamese leader and modeled a bust after him.

=== The 1950s ===
For health reasons, Vu Cao Dam made the decision to leave Paris in 1949, and moved to southern France. Moving his family to the villa Les Heures Claires, the artist settled just down the road from Matisse’s Chapel and only a mile away from where Marc Chagall was living in les Collines. Vu Cao Dam was not only influenced by Chagall and the other members of the École de Paris, but by the art brut artists as well, including Dubuffet and Malaval. The light and atmosphere of southern France also proved to be a heavy influence on Cao Dam's paintings from this period.

In 1954, he presented his paintings at the Les Amis des Arts gallery in Aix en Provence. Paul Hervieu, the dealer and owner of a gallery in Nice, struck up a friendship with the talented Vietnamese artist, and began exhibiting his paintings regularly in Nice as well as overseas, especially in Sweden. Around this time Vu Cao Dam met the famous tailor, Michele Sapone. Filling his shop on the Rue de Chateauneuf in Nice with over 450 paintings and drawings by different artists, the Italian immigrant exchanged tailored suits for these artworks.

=== The 1960s ===
In 1960, Vu Cao Dam exhibited his paintings in London at the Frost & Reed Gallery, and three years later his work was presented in Brussels. The artist then signed an exclusive contract with the art dealer Wally Findlay, Jr. of Wally Findlay Galleries in the United States.

== His art ==
Vu Cao Dam balanced the qualities of traditional Vietnamese painting, and certain characteristics of Western painting. With the exception of some landscapes, Vu Cao Dam concentrated his talents to figure painting. The women and young girls of his native country, along with its folklore and poems were his favorite subjects. These women are often the only dark elements within a composition of lighter colors and delicate tones.

== Bibliography ==
1. Art Articles – Vietnamese Paintings – The Pioneers
2. Taylor, Nora. “Orientalism/Occidentalism: The Founding of the Ecole des Beaux-Arts d’Indochine and the Politics of Painting in Colonial Vietnam, 1925-1945”. Crossroads: An Interdisciplinary Journal of Southeast Asian Studies, Vol. 11, No. 2 (1997). pp. 1–33
3. Belcher, George and Huong, Nguyen Thi Lan. History of Vu Cao Dam. Arts of Asia, Vol. 39 (2010)
4. André-Pallois, Nadine/Ménonville, Corinne de: Paris-Hanoï-Saigon, l'aventure de l'art moderne au Viêt Nam, exhibition catalogue, Pavillon des Arts, Paris, 1998.
5. Kember, Pamela. Benezit Dictionary of Asian Artists. Oxford University Press (2012)
6. Findlay Galleries
