= Võ Xưởng =

- Born: Võ Hữu Xưởng; 8 December 1942 (age 83); Hải Dương, French Indochina
- Occupation: War artist

Võ Xưởng (8 December 1942), also known as Võ Hữu Xưởng, is a Vietnamese war artist whose career documented the Second Indochina War. He joined the People's Army of Vietnam in 1964.

== Early life ==
Xưởng's father painted funeral portraits on a commission basis, inspiring Xưởng to practice art early on in his life. He also collected comic books, which he imitated in an effort to improve his drawing. He sketched and drew throughout his childhood both as a hobby and as a commissioned artist for government institutions and private individuals He did not receive any formal artistic training until after Liberation in 1975.

== Career ==
As a self-taught artist, he was not officially recognised as a war artist for the Democratic Republic of Vietnam (DRV) government. However, his skill was recognised by his peers and superiors and his art works were exhibited during the Vietnam War to help boost the morale of fellow soldiers. He was largely based in South Vietnam.

After the end of the Vietnam War, he finally enrolled in art school, and graduated from Ho Chi Minh City University of Fine Arts in 1981.

Towards the end of his career, he was one of a few well known artists commissioned by the Vietnam government to produce paintings to commemorate special occasions and events such as National Day, the anniversary of Điện Biên Phủ and Reunification Day. The works were the artist's originals which were then published in larger sizes to be hung in the streets.

== Notable works ==
- Special Ranger Dầu Tiếng (Biệt động Dầu Tiếng)
- The Women's Artillery Team in Trang Bằng (Đội nữ pháo binh Trang Bằng)
- Youth Volunteer in Ấp Bắc (Thanh niên xung phong Ấp Bắc)
- Protect the People (Bảo vệ dân)
- Split Fire (Chia lửa)
- Legendary Vietnamese Mother (Huyền thoại mẹ Việt Nam)
- Sac Commandos (Đặc công rừng Sác xuất kích)

== Publications ==
- Modern Vietnamese Visual Artists (Nghệ sĩ tạo hình Việt Nam hiện đại), 2009, Vietnam Fine Arts Association, Hanoi
- Artists in The Revolution (Kỷ Yếu các tác giả chiến tranh Cách mạng)
- Military Art and Literature Magazine (Văn Nghệ Quân Đội)

== Collections ==
- Ho Chi Minh City Fine Arts Museum
- Military Museum, Hanoi
- Cần Thơ Museum, Cần Thơ Province, Mekong Delta
- Military Zone 4 Museum, Bình Dương Province
- Hồ Chí Minh City Fine Arts Museum
- Tây Ninh Museum (based on the Central Office of the Southern Liberation Bureau)
- Witness Collection

== Awards ==
- Second-class Resistance Medal
- First Class Liberation Medal
- First Class Honorary Medal
- Medal for Vietnamese Fine Arts Career
- Medal for the Protection of Vietnam's Cultural Heritage
