= Nguyễn Sỹ Ngọc =

Vietnamese painter

Nguyễn Sỹ Ngọc (6 April 1919 - 25 December 1990 in Hanoi) was a Vietnamese painter. He was notable among painters for subversive political stances. After 1944 he was a faculty member at the renamed EBAI, Hanoi University of Fine Arts, but for his participation in the journal Nhân Văn he spent 1957–1959 in a re-education camp. After his release, until his retirement in 1983 he was an executive on the Arts Committee.

== Works ==
- Cái bát "Bowl of water"
- L'Amitié entre l'armée et le peuple, 1951
