= Đinh Ý Nhi =

Vietnamese painter

Đinh Ý Nhi (Hanoi, 1967) is a Vietnamese painter. She graduated from Hanoi University of Fine Arts in 1989. She achieved during the 1990s early success with two-colour, red or black and white paintings addressing modern themes an issues and devoid of gender. Like Đỗ Thị Ninh she refuses to be labelled a "woman artist." Later she married, moved to Da Nang and changed her style completely.

She began to incorporate elements of popular culture in her art when Western goods became more available in Vietnam.
