= Lê Thị Lựu =

Vietnamese painter (1911–1988)

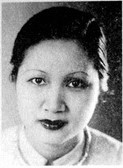
- Lê Thị Lựu in 1947
- Born: Lê Thị Lựu; 19 January 1911; Gia Lam, Hanoi, Vietnam
- Died: 6 June 1988 (aged 77); Antibes, France
- Education: Vietnam University of Fine Arts
- Known for: Oil painting; silk painting
- Movement: Realism; classicism; expressionism; impressionism
- Spouse: Ngô Thế Tân (m. 1934–1988)
- Children: 1

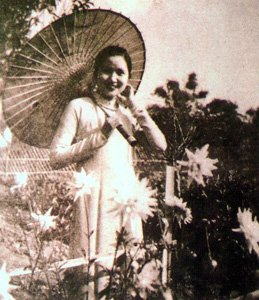
Lê Thị Lựu took a photo with an oil-paper umbrella in 1940

Lê Thị Lựu (黎氏榴, 19 January 1911 – 6 June 1988) was a Vietnamese woman painter. She was one of the first women and rare notable female alumni of Victor Tardieu's École des Beaux-Arts de l’Indochine in Hanoi, becoming the school's first female painter at the age of 16. With Mai Trung Thứ, Lê Phổ and Vũ Cao Đàm she was one of four Vietnamese artists in the 1930s to emigrate to and make a career in Paris. She used to be a teacher at Bưởi school, where her students included Phan Kế An, who also became a famous painter. During her time in France, she became a prolific art teacher before retiring in 1971.

== Early life ==
Lê Thi Lu'u was born on January 19, 1911, in Tho Khoi in Ha Bac, North Vietnam (modern day Hanoi). Her father, Le Van Que, was a civil servant with a French education that gave him access to social circles that included future editor-in-chiefs and future senators.

While Lu'u's two elder sisters enrolled in a teaching college, she instead opted for the Hanoi Fine Arts Academy in 1926. While in the academy, she was learning to draw nudes, all of whom were prison mates as they were the only people willing to pose nude at the time. Being one of the only female students in a class full of males meant she was often ostracised and the male students would even go to the extent of desecrating her works out of jealously and prejudice.

She later became a professor at prestigious schools such as Buoi School, Hang Bai School (Hanoi), Gia Dinh Fine Arts School, Saigon.

== Works ==
Lu'u's works were heavily inspired by the Classicism and Impressionism movements, which is evident in her works which are full of life and colour. She often uses oil and silk as her medium while also experimenting with gouache and ink, giving her works a soft and melancholic feeling.

The subjects in her work consists mainly of women and children. Some examples include:

- Girl with her bouquet, Ink and gouache on silk, undated
- Woman and children, Ink and gouache on silk, circa 1960s
- La Confidence (Women Confiding), Ink and gouache on silk, 1938
- La Course à Quatre Pattes (Race on Hands and Knees), gouache on silk laid on paper, 1970
- Mère et enfant, Gouache on silk mounted on paper, 1968
