= Dương Bích Liên =

Vietnamese painter

Dương Bích Liên (17 July 1924 – 12 December 1988) was a Vietnamese painter. He is reported to have drunk himself to death. He was a posthumous recipient of the Ho Chi Minh Prize in 2000.

== Works ==
Some of his works are in the Vietnam National Museum of Fine Arts, Hanoi.

Dương Bích Liên, Portrait of a lady, pastel on paper
