= Lê Minh Trường =

Vietnamese photographer (b. 1930, d. 2011)

Lê Minh Trường (1930–2011) was a North Vietnamese photographer during the Second Indochina War.

== Early years ==
Lê Minh Trường was born in 1930 in Thua Thien, Hue.

== Career ==
Lê fought for the Viet Minh and was part of the unit that escorted Prince Souphanouvong from North Vietnam to the caves at the headquarters of the Pathet Lao. In 1956, he was seriously wounded in the head by a piece of flying shrapnel and was declared unfit to continue in a combat unit. This led to his reassignment as a photographer with the Vietnamese News Agency in 1958 where he was tasked with photographing the Ho Chi Minh trail. Lê travelled alone and worked with few supplies in the harsh conditions of the mountains and forests, often using water from the Mekong Delta and the cover of the night sky to develop his film.

== Accolades ==
Lê won first prize at the National Photography Exhibition of 1969 and 1971.
