= Phạm Lực =

Vietnamese painter (born 1943)

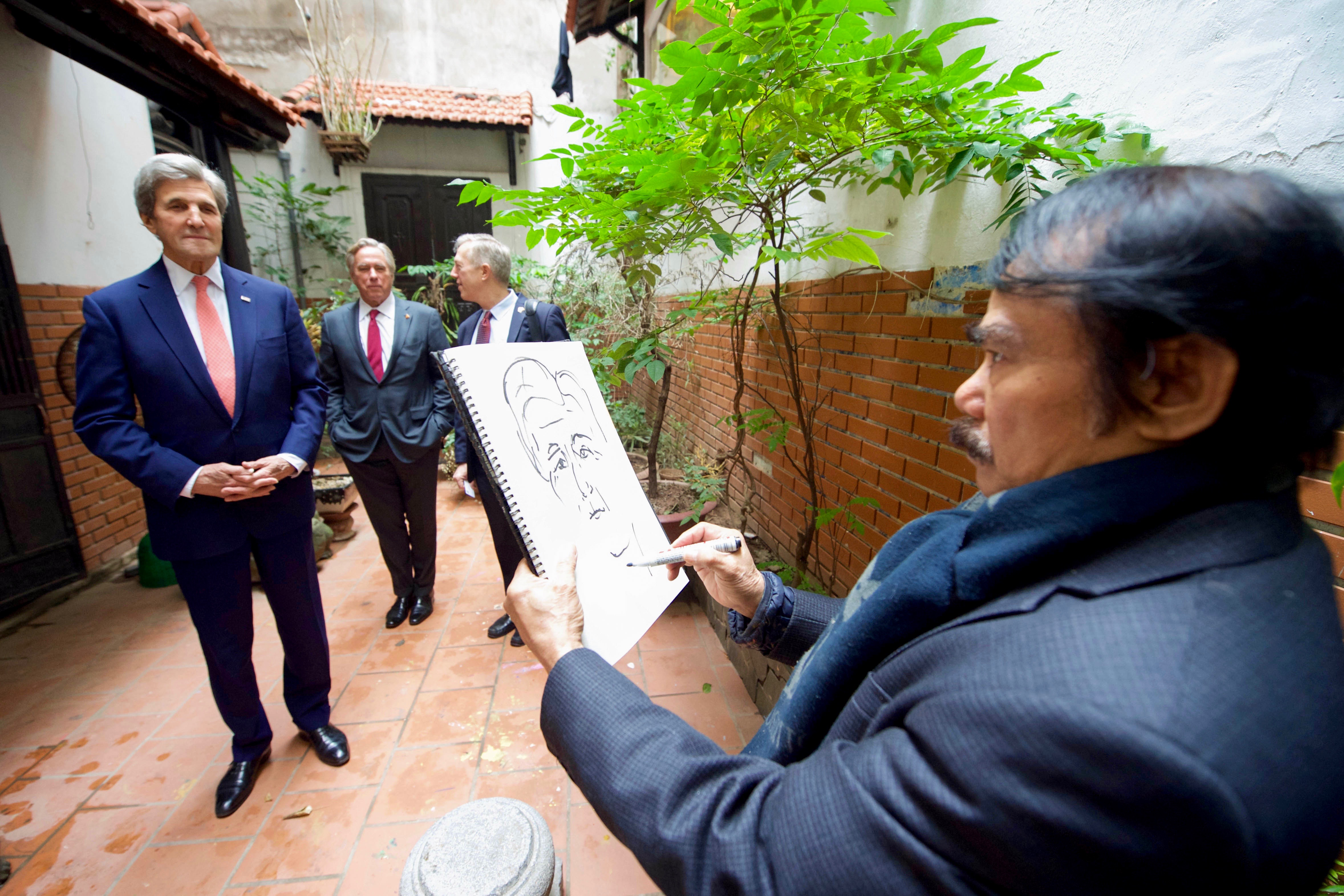
Pham Luc draws a portrait of U.S. Secretary of State John Kerry on 13 January 2017, as the Secretary visited his studio in Hanoi, Vietnam, during Kerry's final trip abroad

Phạm Lực (Huế, 1943) is a Vietnamese painter. Pham Luc served in the North Vietnamese army as a painter. Luc has exhibited paintings in Vietnam and overseas, and continues to paint. He has one daughter and one son, and lives in Hanoi.

He was interviewed in Ken Burns's series The Vietnam War.
