= Tạ Tỵ =

Vietnamese painter and poet (1922–2004)

- Born: 24 September 1922; Hanoi, French Indochina
- Died: 24 August 2004 (aged 81); Ho Chi Minh City, Vietnam
- Occupation: Painter
- Writing career
- Genre: Poetry

Tạ Tỵ (24 September 1922 – 24 August 2004) was a Vietnamese painter and poet. After the Vietnam War ended in 1975, he was sent to a reeducation camp until 1981. Afterwards he and his wife left Vietnam as boat people via Malaysia and resettled in California in 1983. He returned to Vietnam shortly before his death in 2004. His paintings were originally influenced by cubism turning to abstract art around 1961.
