= Nam Sơn =

- Ward
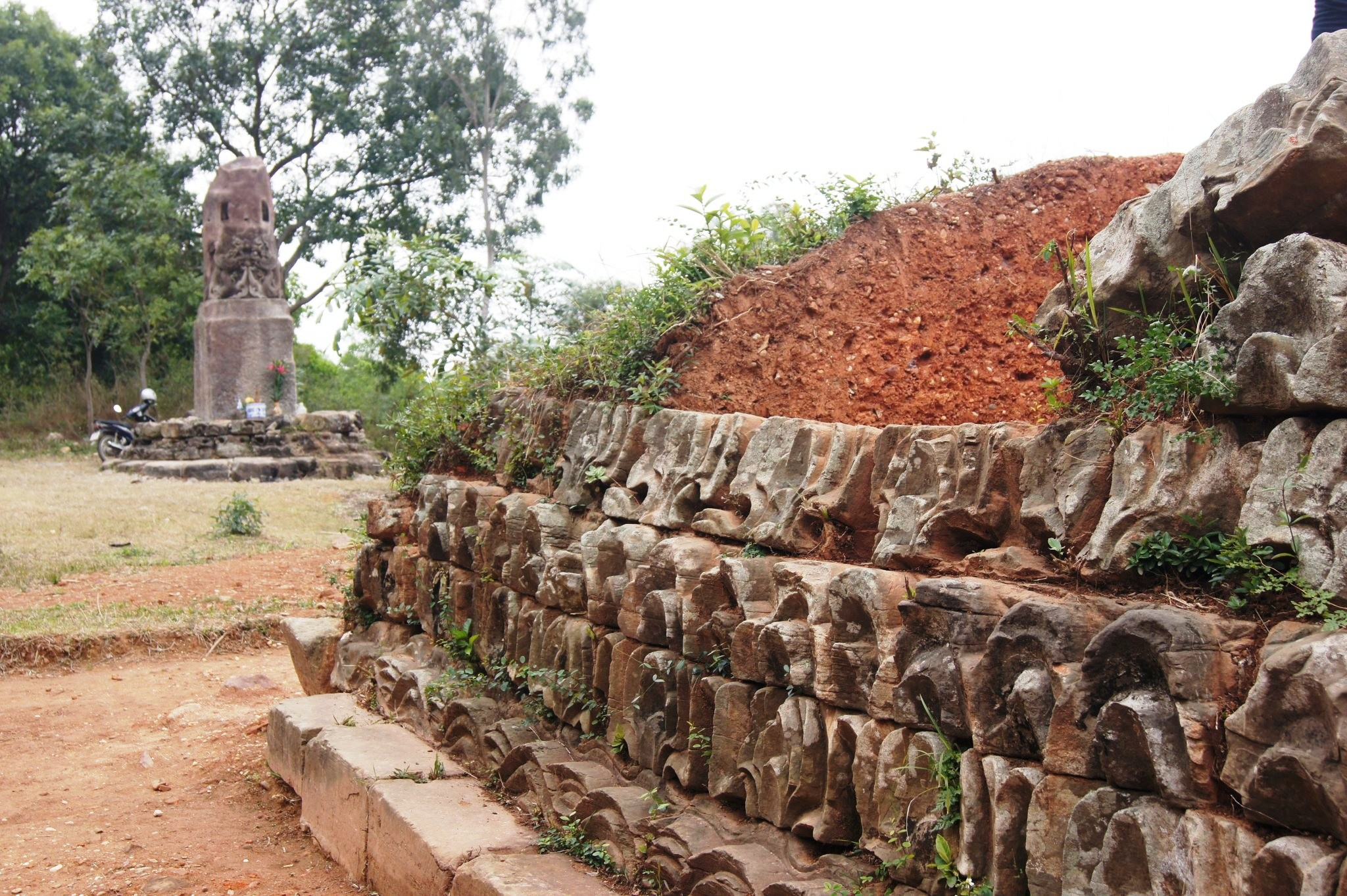
- Remains of the base of the tower at Dạm Pagoda
- Interactive map of Nam Sơn
- Coordinates: 21°8′41″N 106°6′10″E
- Country: Vietnam
- Region: Red River Delta
- Municipality: Bắc Ninh
- Established: 1 December 2019
- Administrative headquarters: 9 Hàm Long Street

Area
  - Total: 18.53 km^{2} (7.15 sq mi)

Population (2024)
  - Total: 95,696
  - Density: 5,164/km^{2} (13,370/sq mi)
- Website: namson.bacninh.gov.vn

Nam Sơn is a ward in the municipality of Bắc Ninh, Vietnam.

On 16 June 2025:

- The National Assembly of Vietnam adopted Resolution No. 203/2025/QH15 amending and supplementing several articles of the Constitution of Vietnam (effective from 16 June 2025). Under the resolution, district-level administrative units nationwide ceased to operate from 1 July 2025.
- The Standing Committee of the National Assembly of Vietnam issued Resolution No. 1658/NQ-UBTVQH15 on the arrangement of commune-level administrative units in Bắc Ninh province in 2025 (effective from 16 June 2025). Under the resolution, the entire area and population of Vân Dương and Nam Sơn wards were merged to form a new ward named Nam Sơn.

On 24 August 2026, the National Assembly adopted Resolution No. 39/2026/QH16 on the establishment of the municipality of Bắc Ninh from the entire area and population of Bắc Ninh province (effective from 20 September 2026). Since then, Nam Sơn Ward has been part of the municipality of Bắc Ninh.
