= Nguyễn Văn Tỵ =

Vietnamese painter

- Born: 1917; Hanoi, Vietnam
- Died: 19 January 1992; Hanoi, Vietnam

Nguyễn Văn Tỵ (Hanoi, 1917 – Hanoi, 19 January 1992) was a Vietnamese painter. He studied art at the École des Beaux-Arts de l’Indochine 1934-41 where classmates included Hoàng Tích Chù and Nguyễn Tiến Chung. In 2001, he was posthumously awarded the Hồ Chí Minh Prize for his contribution to the arts.

Nam Bắc Một Nhà, lacquer art
