= Tô Ngọc Vân =

Vietnamese painter

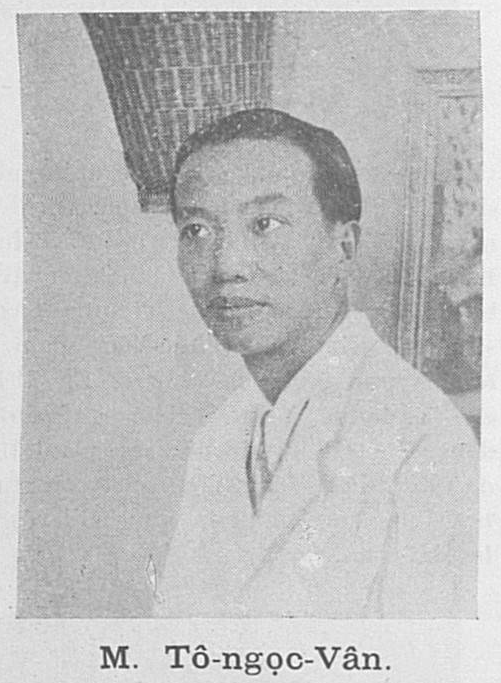
- Born: 1906; Hưng Yên
- Died: 1954 (48 years old)
- Notable work: Younger lady beside tuberose
- Awards: Ho Chi Minh Prize

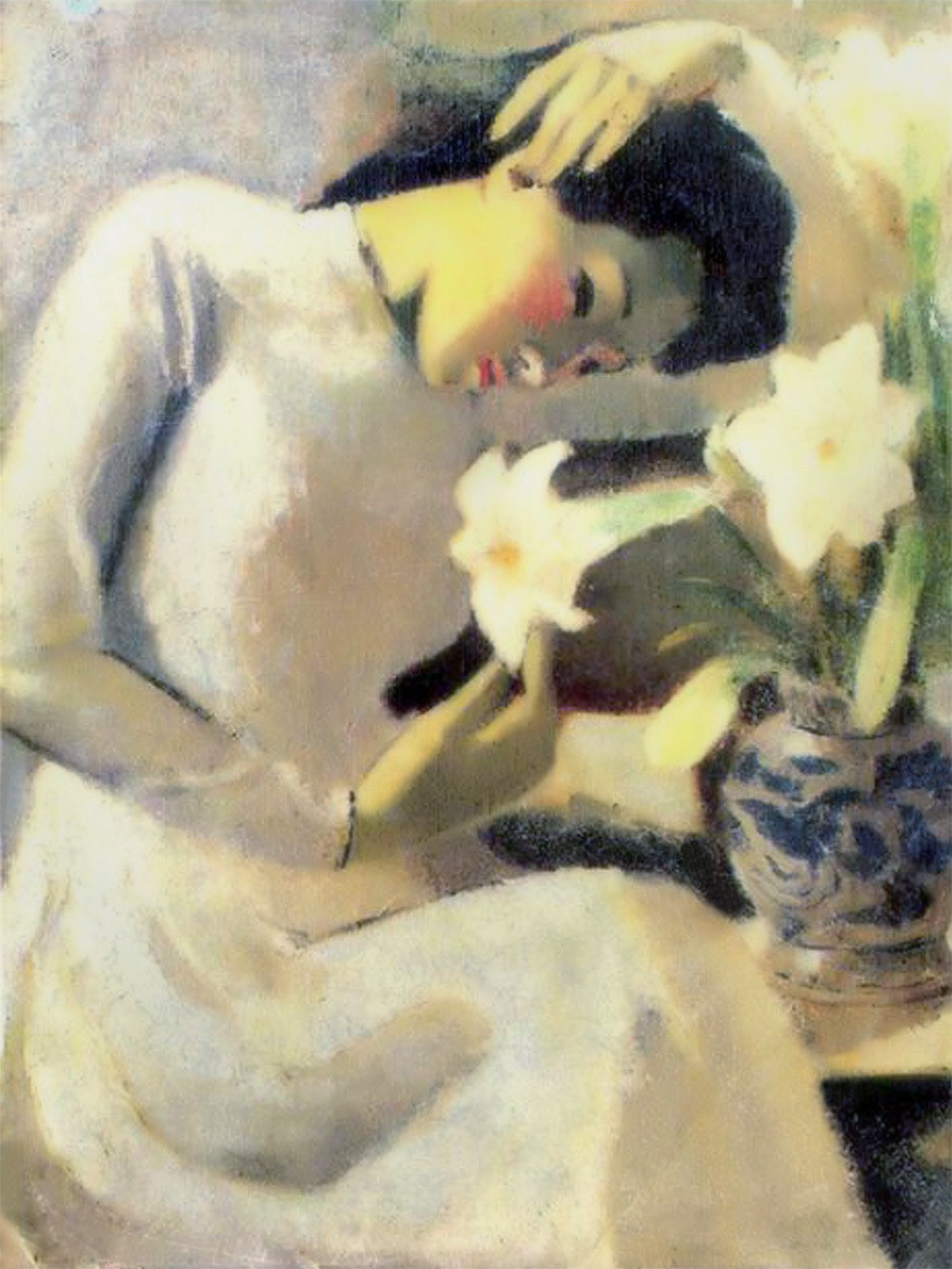
Girl with flower, 1943

Tô Ngọc Vân (蘇玉雲, 15 December 1906 or 1908 – 17 June 1954), also known as Tô Tử, was a Vietnamese painter. Several of his paintings are being displayed at the Vietnam National Museum of Fine Arts. He taught a resistance art class in the northern zone during the war with the French, and died as the result of injuries received at the Battle of Điện Biên Phủ. He was among the first recipients of the Ho Chi Minh Prize in 1996.

He worked as painting teacher in Bưởi school, professor at the École des Beaux-Arts de l’Indochine and principal of the Việt Bắc Art School and has had significant influence on a whole generation of artists in Vietnam.

Vân contributed to the magazines of Tự Lực văn đoàn ("Self-Strengthening literary group") by drawing cartoons on current events, social issues, and everyday live.

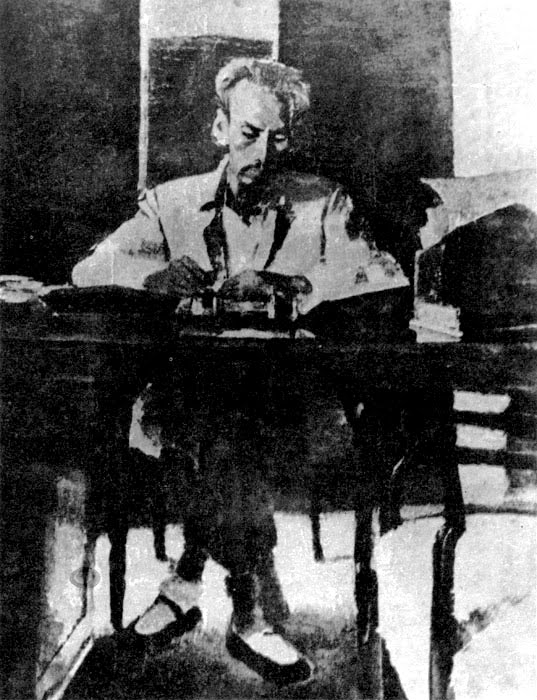
President Ho working in Bắc Bộ Phủ

The To Ngoc Van (crater) on Mercury was named in his honour.

== Life and career ==
Ngọc Vân was born on December 15, 1906 (although some sources record his birth in 1908) in Xuan Cau village, Van Giang district, Hung Yen province.

Ngọc Vân was born as a poor boy and skipped school during his third year in high school to follow his dream of becoming an artist. In 1926, he was able to pass the entrance exam in the Vietnam University of Fine Arts during the first generation of the school and graduated two years later. Ngọc Vân painted many places in his artwork, some of which include Bangkok, Huế, and Phnom Penh. He was also a writer and art critic in the art press. He cooperated with the Vietnamese newspapers Phong Hóa và Ngày Nay and Thanh Nghị.

== Typical works ==
=== Before 1945 ===
- The Girl by the Lotus (1944)
- Girl by the lily (1943)
- Two Girls and a Baby (1944)
- A young woman sitting by a picture of a tam da (1942)
- Noon (1936)
- Flower Side (1942)
- All are oil paintings.

=== After 1945 ===
- Ho Chi Minh worked in the North of Vietnam (1946-oil painting)
- Overnight on the hill (lacquer - 1948)
- The real buffalo (watercolor sketch - 1954)
- Two soldiers (watercolor - 1949)
- Resting on the Hill (1948)
- And hundreds of resistance sketches.

== Honor ==
- First prize at National Fine Arts Exhibition November 1954 in Hanoi
- Class independent Medal
- Second Class Resistance Medal
- Medal for the cause of Vietnam Literature and Art
- Medal for the cause of Vietnam Fine Arts
- Letter of praise from Uncle Ho (1952) and the shirt Uncle Ho gave him (1954)

He was posthumously awarded the first Ho Chi Minh Prize for literature and art (1996). His name is given to many streets in a number of cities and towns in Vietnam such as Hanoi capital, Ho Chi Minh city, Thu Duc, Da Nang, Hung Yen, Hai Duong, Yen Bai, Da Lat, Vung Ship ... and put for a crater on Mercury.

In Hanoi, his name is given to the small street northeast of Ho Tay, Xuan Dieu street enters Quang Ba village, reaches the Quang Ba swimming pool junction, turns left to go to the gate of the hotel and public tourism company. Hanoi delegation 530m long
