= Bùi Xuân Phái =

Vietnamese artist (1920–1988)

- Born: September 1, 1920; Hanoi, Vietnam
- Died: June 24, 1988 (aged 67); Hanoi, Vietnam
- Education: École Supérieure des Beaux-Arts d'Indochine
- Notable work: Hanoi Old Quarters, 1972
- Spouse: Nguyễn Thị Sính
- Children: 1

Bùi Xuân Phái (September 1, 1920 – June 24, 1988) was a Vietnamese painter. He is famous for the painting of Hanoi Old Quarters. He also painted the actors and musicians of Vietnamese opera.

== Biography ==
The best known of all Vietnamese modern painters, Phái is respected and admired for both his art and moral character. Bùi Xuân Phái's hometown is in Kim Hoang village, Van Canh commune, Hoai Duc district, old Ha Tay province. Phái was born into a typical family in Hanoi. Phái's father, Bui Xuan Ho, was educated under the French colonial system and this brought intellectual reputation to his children. Growing up, Phái did not have a good relationship with his father. However, just before his father's death, 20 years old Phái had sold his first painting in Hanoi and his other paintings had been selected for an exhibition in Tokyo, Japan.

Phái was heavily influenced by the works of great European artists such as Picasso, Matisse, and Chagall. Phái often acknowledges the perspectives of these famous artists and always reminded himself of the importance of the contours of art regardless of his economic situation. Phái did not stick to only using canvas and paper to create his art but created his artworks virtually on any surface in which his drawings and paintings could cling. Despite Phái having a proper upbringing in life, he often traded drawings and paintings for needs to sustain his home and family.

Phái's early works portrays the soul of Hanoi's in the 1950s, 1960s, and 1970s. The style in Phái's paintings often have bold outlines, putting emphasis and depth to depth and people. Through Phái's paintings, he sends a message of memory, nostalgia, and sadness. In addition to painting the soul of Hanoi, he also painted portraits, countryside, nude, and still life. As previously mentioned, Phái painted on whatever he could get his hands on. For example, he painted on canvas, paper, wooden boards, and even newspapers, using various painting mediums such as oil paints, watercolors, pastels, charcoal, and pencil. All Phái's works deeply express the Vietnamese soul, humanity, love for nature, sadness, and misery.

Bùi Xuân Phái died on June 24, 1988, in Hanoi, the place of his birth. In 1996, Phái was posthumously awarded the Ho Chi Minh Prize in Literature and Art.

== Career ==
In Phái's youth, he drew cartoons for newspapers. He earned money from royalties and enrolled himself into the introductory course at the École Supérieure des Beaux-Arts d'Indochine. The principle at École Supérieure des Beaux-Arts d'Indochine was to train artists within the traditional thematic principles encompassing traditional arts. While being at École Supérieure des Beaux-Arts d'Indochine, Phái was in constant critique over his identity and found himself often involved with the principle instructor of painting. 2 years after graduating from École Supérieure des Beaux-Arts d'Indochine, Phái joined the August resistance in Hanoi and took part in artistic activities in Northern Vietnam from 1947 to 1952. In 1957, Phái became a member of the Vietnam Fine Arts Association. However, during the same time period, Phái lost his teaching position at the Hanoi College of Fine Arts for supporting Nhan Van affair, a movement for political and cultural freedom and was not allowed to show his work in public until a solo exhibition in 1984.

== Honors and awards ==
=== Main awards ===
- Ho Chi Minh Prize in Literature and Art 1996
- 1946 National Fine Arts Exhibition Award
- National Fine Arts Exhibition Award 1980
- Leipzig Graphics Award (Germany)
- Capital Fine Arts Award in 1969, 1981, 1983, 1984

=== Others ===
- Medal of Vietnamese Fine Arts 1997
- On September 1, 2019, Phái was honored by a Google Doodle on his 99th birthday.

== Artworks ==
=== Main artworks ===
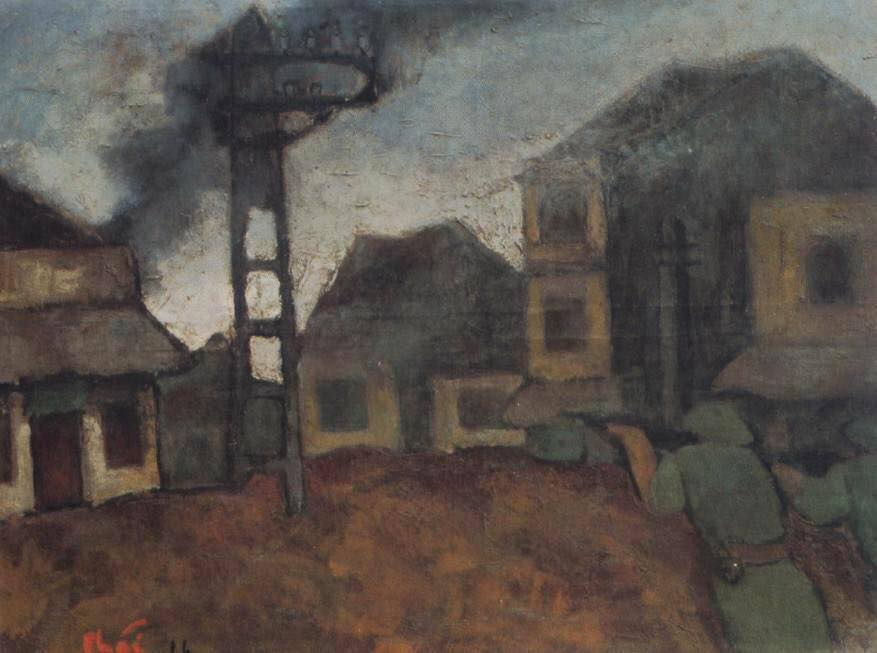
Hanoi Old Quarter, 1972

- Hanoi Old Quarters, 1972 (Oil painting)
- Resistance in Hanoi, 1966 (Oil painting)
- An Ox Cart in Old Quarter, 1972 (Oil painting)
- Deserted Street, 1981 (Oil painting)
- Make-up Before a Cheo Representation, 1968 (Oil painting)
- Cheo Stage, 1968 (Oil painting)
- A Cheo Couple, 1967 (Oil painting)
- Before Curtain Time, 1984 (Oil painting)

== See also ==
- Vietnamese art
- List of Vietnamese artists
- Culture of Vietnam
- History of Vietnam
