= Lacquer painting =

East Asian form of painting

Lacquer painting is a form of painting with lacquer which was practised in East Asia for decoration on lacquerware, and found its way to Europe and the Western World both via Persia and the Middle East and by direct contact with Continental Asia. The artistic form was revived and developed as a distinct genre of fine art painting by Vietnamese artists in the 1930s; the genre is known in Vietnamese as "sơn mài."

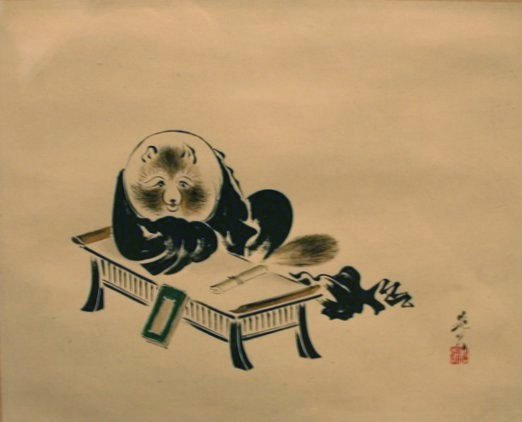
Badger Studying a Sutra by Shibata Zeshin (Japan)

== Technique ==
Making a lacquer painting may take several months depending on the technique used and the number of layers of lacquer. In Vietnam's sơn mài lacquer painting, a black board is prepared first. Then colour chalks are used on the prepared board for base sketch. Needles can also be used for carving the base sketch as an alternative. In lacquer painting, eggshells are used as white colour due to the lack of pure white colour in lacquer. Layers of clear varnish can be applied optionally depending on the purpose of the painting. Polishing is done in the end to reveal the different layers of colours applied before. First, the artist uses chalk to sketch an outline onto the surface of the wooden panel, then applies lacquer to define the lines. Next, silver leaf is affixed to the surface to add luminosity to the subsequent layers of lacquer paint. White tones can be achieved by incorporating crushed eggshells or various types of seashells, which are embedded into the surface of the artwork. In Vietnam, an artist may apply up to ten layers or more of coloured and clear lacquer. In Ming China artwork, up to a hundred layers are included. Each layer requires drying and polishing. When all layers are applied, the artist polishes different parts of the painting until the preferred colours are shown. Fine sandpapers, a mix of charcoal powder and human hair are used to carefully reach the correct layer of each specific colour. Consequently, "lacquer painting" is in part a misnomer, since the bringing out of the colours is not done in the preparatory painting but in the burnishing of the lacquer layers to reveal the desired image beneath. Therefore, lacquer painting is considered a "subtracting method" of drawing technique.

== National styles ==
=== East Asia ===
==== China ====
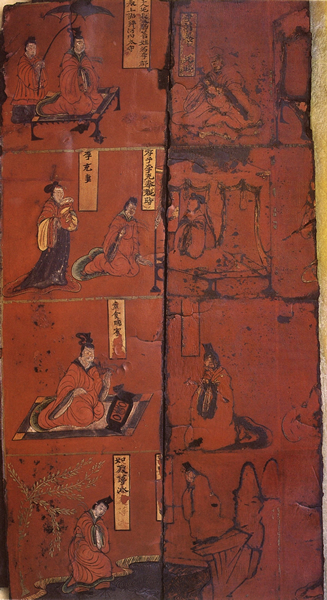
A lacquer painting over wood, dated to the Northern Wei dynasty.

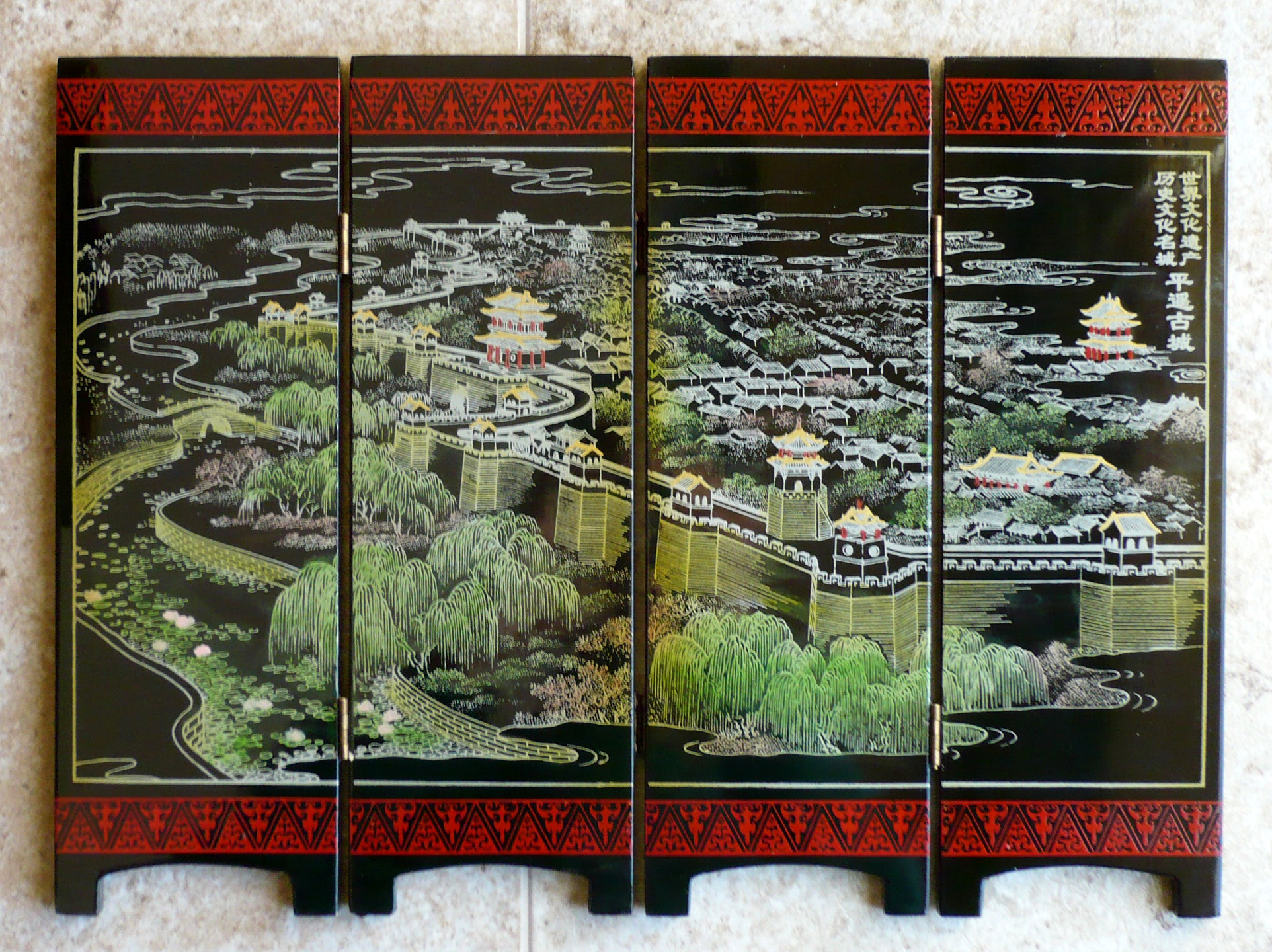
Pingyao lacquer screen

Lacquer had been used since the Shang dynasty (1384-1111 BCE) for decoration and preservation of wooden objects. By the Han dynasty decoration had become more intricate. Lacquer painting is sometimes used for decoration of wooden objects such as the traditional "Chinese candy box".

==== Japan ====
In Japan lacquer painting is secondary to techniques such as silver inlay, Maki-e on Japanese lacquerware, and carving on Kamakura-bori, and Ryukyuan lacquerware. Painting featured on the "Japanning" works of industrial Britain.

==== Korea ====
The Korean art of najeon also involved lacquer painting, with najeonchilgi a particular kind of Korean handicraft.

=== Europe ===
==== Russia ====
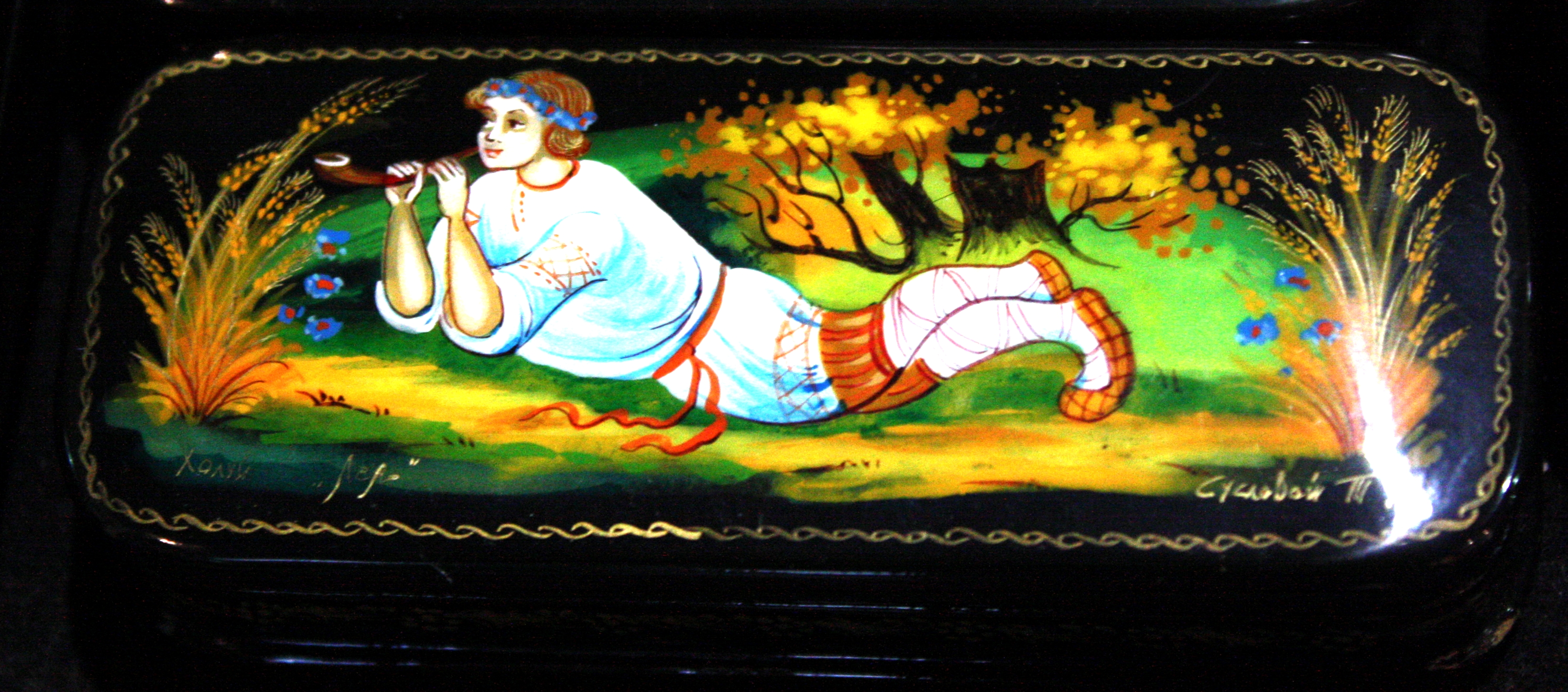
Russian lacquer-painted box

Russia's tradition of lacquer painting (Russian: лаковая живопись, lakovaya zhivopis) before the revolution was connected with folk art and production of icons. The Fedoskino miniature (Russian: федоскинская миниатюра) of Fedoskino village is a genre of lacquer miniature painting on papier-mâché, originating from the late 18th century. From the 1930s this genre also began to be used in proletarian art. Russian lacquer painting is built up through several layers of varnish, creating a three-dimensional effect.

=== Southeast Asia ===
==== Vietnam ====
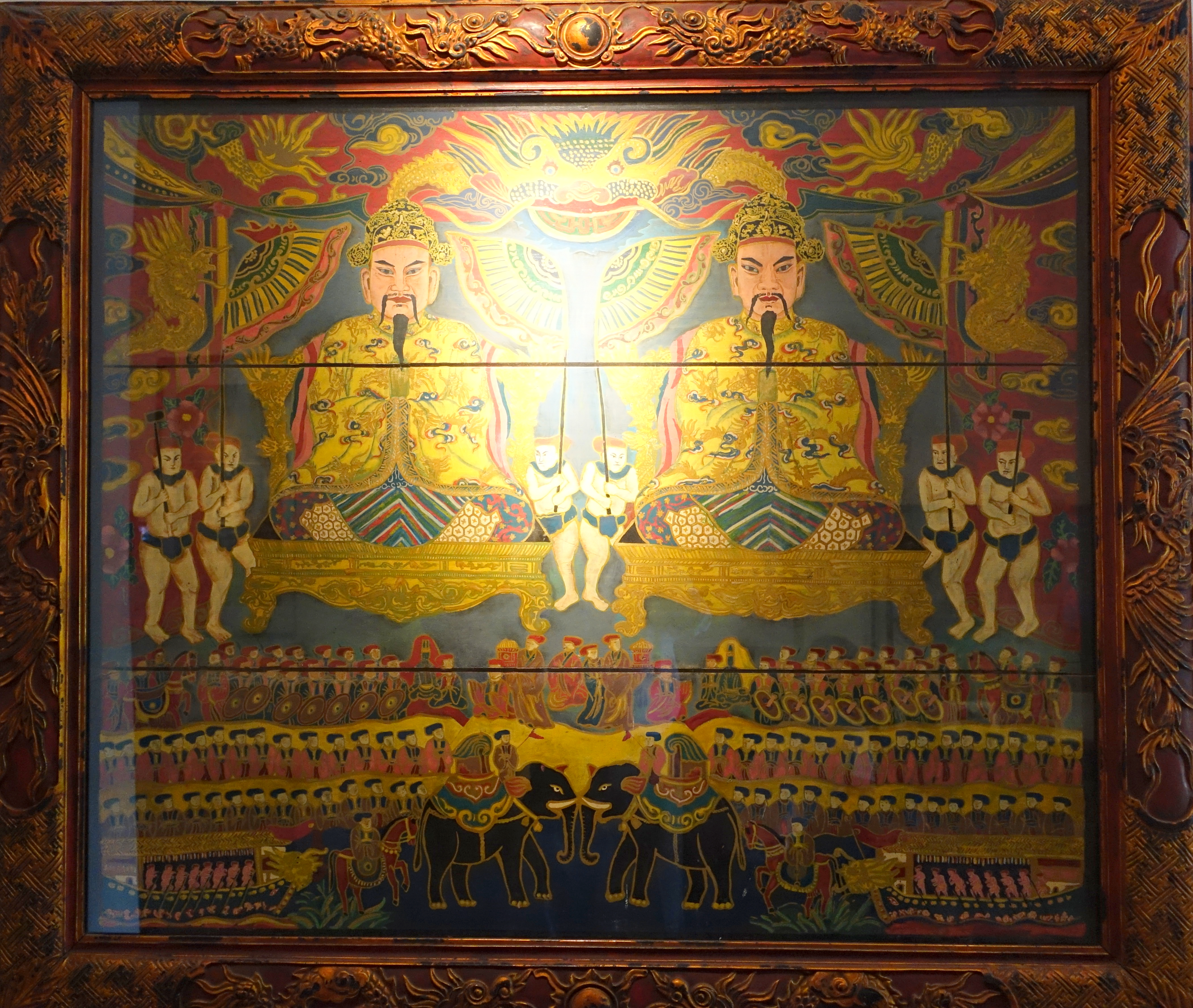
A lacquer painting of the Revival Lê dynasty

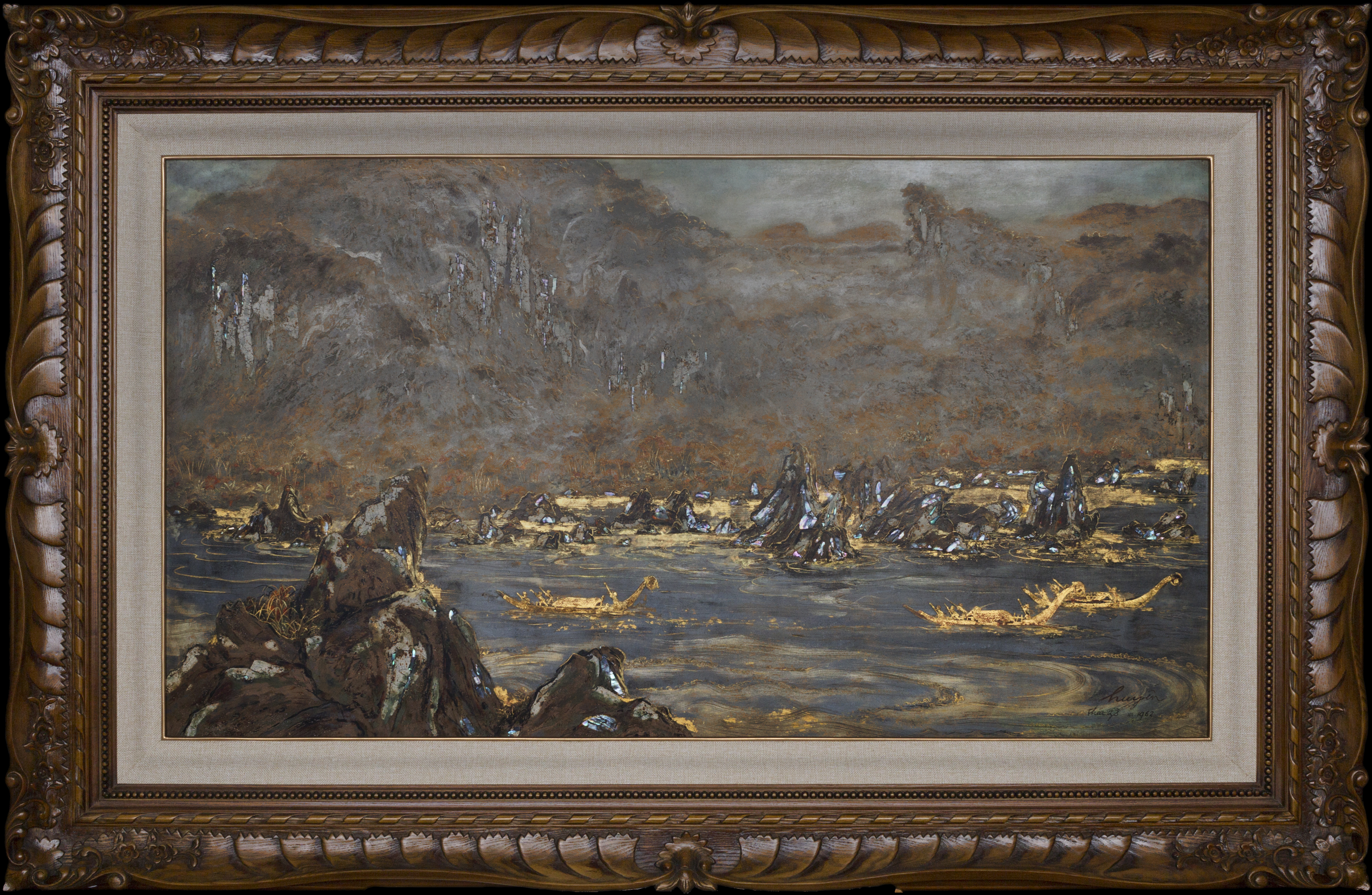
A modern lacquer painting (1962)

Lacquer painting, known as sơn mài, from the resin of the sơn tree, Rhus succedanea, was developed in Vietnam as a freestanding form, separate from decoration of wooden objects. A revival and a combination with French techniques occurred in the 1930s which was closely associated with the French teachers and Vietnamese students of the École Supérieure des Beaux-Arts de l’Indochine in Hanoi from 1925 to 1945 such as Joseph Inguimberty and Nguyễn Gia Trí. Among the prominent newer generation of Vietnamese lacquer painters is Cong Quoc Ha, who received numerous awards and his works are regularly exhibited worldwide.
