= Vietnam University of Fine Arts =

Art school in Hanoi, Vietnam

Coordinates: 21.0221°N 105.8428°E

- Vietnamese: Trường Đại học Mỹ thuật Việt Nam
- Former names: Indochina College of Fine Arts (1925-1945); The College of Fine Arts(1945-1950); Vietnam Intermediate School of Fine Arts (1950-1957)^{a} Vietnam College of Fine Arts (1957 - 1981)^{b} Hanoi University of Fine Arts (1981-2008)
- Type: Public, Art school
- Established: 1925
- Founders: Victor Tardieu and Nam Sơn
- Affiliations: Ministry of Culture, Sports and Tourism
- Endowment: ₫35,329,000,000
- President: Phạm Thị Thanh Tú
- Principal: Dr Đặng Thị Phong Lan
- Academic staff: 60 (2024/25)
- Administrative staff: 35 (2024/25)
- Students: 612 (2024/25)
- Undergraduates: 566 (2024/25)
- Postgraduates: 46 (2024/25)
- Location: Hanoi, Vietnam
- Campus: 10,156 m^{2} (2.510 acres)
- Publication: Journal of Fine Arts Research (Vietnamese: Tạp chí Nghiên cứu Mỹ thuật)
- Website: mythuatvietnam.edu.vn
- ^{a} In the Vietnamese education system, an Intermediate School offers intermediate diplomas, which are above high school level but below a college diploma or associate degree.^{b} A college in Vietnam awards associate degrees, equivalent to diplomas in some countries and below the level of Bachelor’s degrees.

The Vietnam University of Fine Arts (formerly Hanoi College of Fine Arts) is an art school in Hanoi, Vietnam originally established in Tonkin under French colonial rule in 1925. The university has trained many of Vietnam's leading artists in Fine Art, Arts Education, Criticism of Fine Arts and Theory, Graphic Design, History, Painting & Sculpture. Each year it participates in many cultural exchanges with sister institutions overseas.

== History ==
=== French colonial administrations (1925-1945) ===
The history of the Vietnam University of Fine Arts can be traced back to the colonial École des Beaux Arts de l’Indochine (1925–45) (the Indochina College of Fine Arts) which trained successive generations of Vietnamese students — and a smaller number of students from Cambodia and Laos — in the western art tradition, laying the groundwork for the development of a distinctive Vietnamese style of modern art. The École des Beaux-Arts de l’Indochine in Hanoi was the predecessor of the Hanoi College of Fine Arts, which went on to become the present day university.

The école was established by the French colonial government, along similar lines to the École Nationale des Beaux-Arts d’Alger, established 1843, and École des Beaux-Arts de Tunis, established 1923. The school was for all students who were then known to the French as Indochinese — including Tonkinese (Bắc Kỳ), Annamese (Trung Kỳ), Cochin Chinese (i.e., not ethnic Chinese but inhabitants of Nam Kỳ), Khmer, and Lao — although inevitably most students were drawn from Hanoi itself.

==== Directors and teaching staff ====
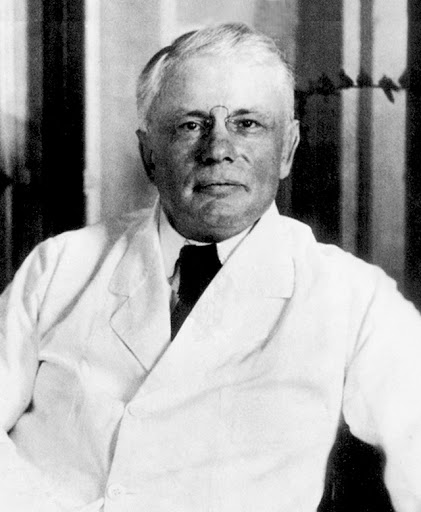
Victor Tardieu, a co-founder of École des Beaux-Arts de l'Indochine.

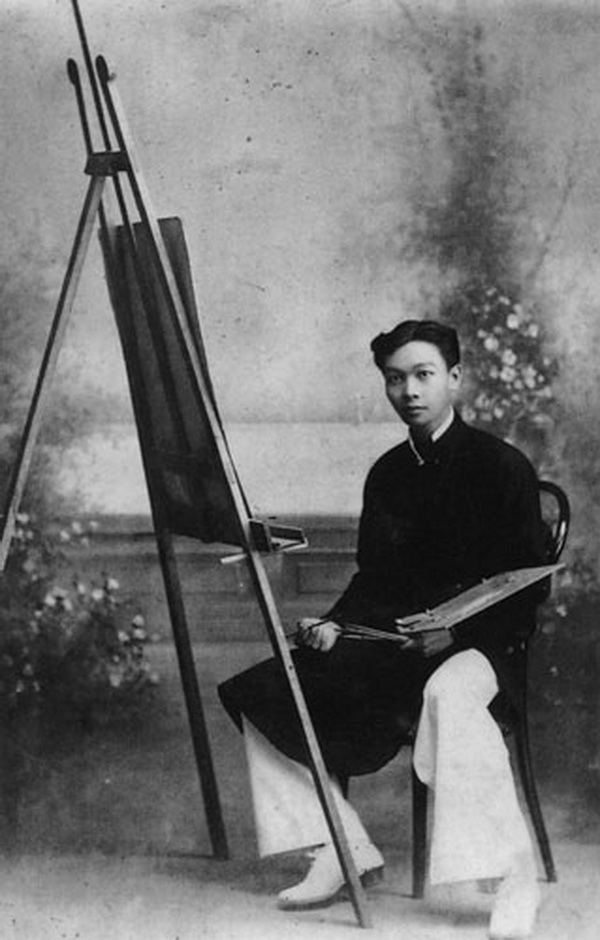
Nguyễn Nam Sơn, co-founder of the school and assistant to Tardieu.

The École des Beaux-Arts de l'Indochine was managed by the French academic and painter, Victor Tardieu . (Note: Nguyen Binh Minh. Deputy Director, Vietnam Fine Arts Museum, photographs by Nguyen Kim Long ... from 1909, but those that did, such as Le Van Mien (1873–1943), Nguyen Van Tho (Nam Son) (1890 1973) and Thang 'Iran Phenh (1895 ?) ... FASI was established bv the French administration in 1925 under the directorship of French artist Victor Tardieu"). Tardieu was awarded the Prix de l'Indochine and travelled to Indochina in 1920 where he was commissioned to paint murals for the Indochina University and the Central Library in Hanoi. Tardieu directed the École until his death in 1937, and was succeeded by the sculptor Évariste Jonchère who was director from 1938 to 1945. (Note: From the source: "A rare example was in Vietnam in 1937, when sculptor Evariste Jonchère (1892–1956) came from France and took over the Directorship of the École until 1945. While his own work was more modernist than that of Tardieu.")

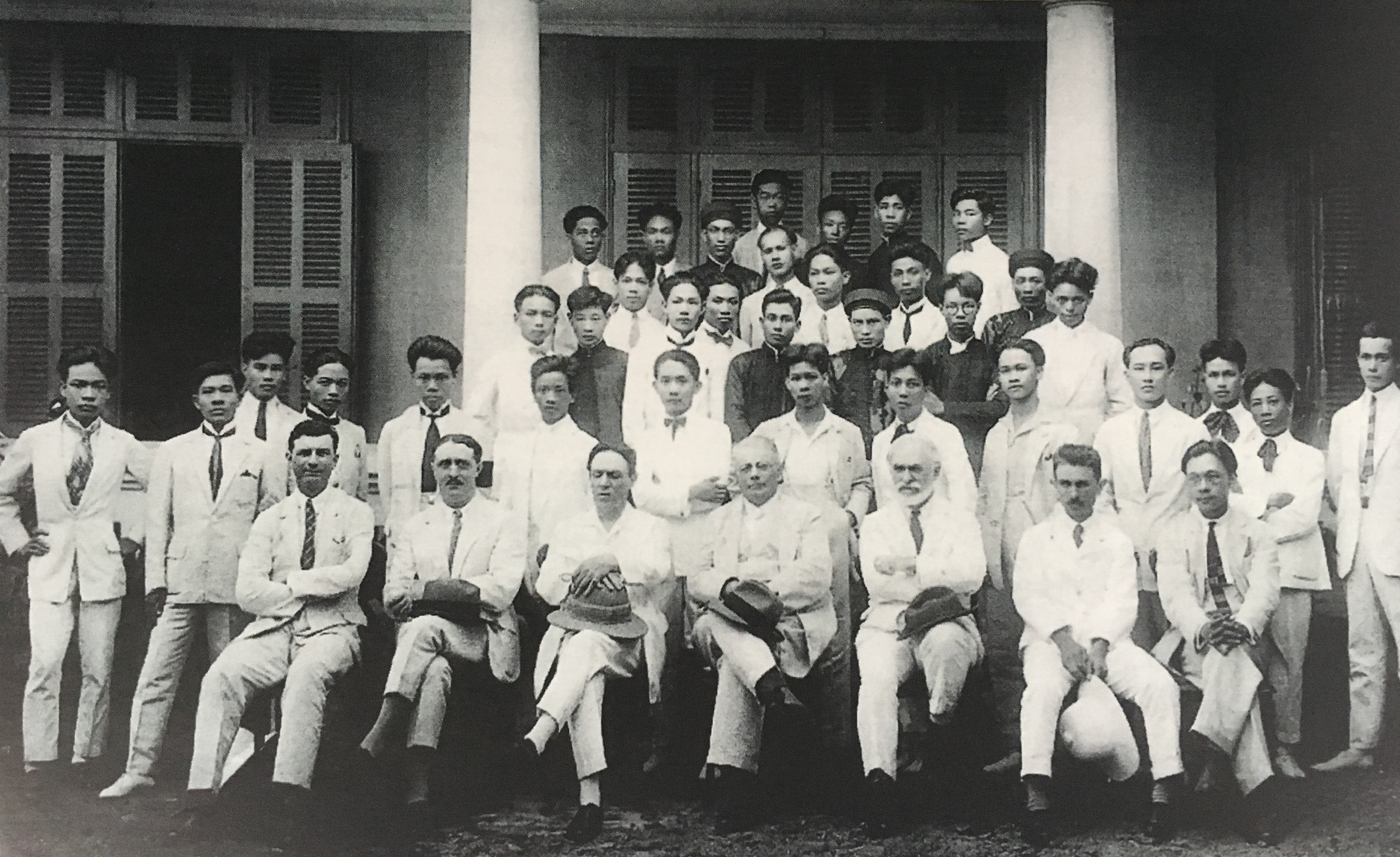
Teachers and students of the school in 1926. Tardieu was pictured 4th from the left in the front row. Nam Sơn was the last person on the right, also in the front row.

Many teachers at the school were winners of the Prix de l'Indochine, an annual award for French artists established by the French government to encourage painters to relocate to the colonies. From 1926, the award-winning artist was required to spend two years in Indochina on a study tour and a year of teaching at the École des Beaux-Arts de l'Indochine. Teachers included Joseph Inguimberty, and Alix Aymé, wife of the deputy commander of the French forces.

==== Curriculum of the École des Beaux-Arts de l'Indochine ====
The curriculum aimed to combine Western and Eastern art traditions, and to train artists and teachers. Students took courses on drawing, linear perspective, open-air painting, and oil painting based on the curriculum at the École des Beaux-Arts in Paris. The École contributed to introducing Western oil painting in Vietnam, which played a role in modern Vietnamese painting.

=== After 1945 ===
The Musée Maurice Long across the street from the École des Beaux-Arts de l'Indochine was destroyed in the 1945 Japanese coup d'état, and the École subsequently closed its doors. The École was taken over by the provisional government of the Democratic Republic of Vietnam after the August Revolution of 1945. When the struggle against the French intensified in 1950, the college was moved to Đại Từ, Thai Nguyen in the Viet Bac Resistance Zone, under the direction of painter Tô Ngọc Vân.

In 1954 professors and students returned to Hanoi where, in 1957, a new Hanoi College of Fine Art was established under the direction of painter Tran Van Can.

Nguyễn Đỗ Cung, a student at the École des Beaux-Arts de l'Indochine from 1929 to 1934, founded the Museum of Fine Arts in 1963.

In 1981 this institution became the Hanoi University of Fine Art. The university offers five-year Bachelor of Fine Art programmes and two-year full-time or three-year part-time Master of Arts programmes in Painting, Graphic Art and Sculpture, and four-year Bachelor of Fine Art Education programmes.

In 2026 the institution will be celebrating their 100th anniversary (1925-2026). To commemorate this occasion, starting in 2025 The Vietnam University of Fine Arts introduced the Gold Sponsor, the Million Vietnam, an international auction group (an exclusive trustee) founded in 1928. The two establishments created the Victoria Tardieu Award for the exceptional students who trained at Vietnam University of Fine Arts.

== Governance ==
After Vietnam declared its independence from France in 1945, the university came under the administration of the provisional Vietnamese government at the time, specifically as part of the Ministry of Education. Since 1950, the university has been governed by various iterations of what is currently the Ministry of Culture, Sports, and Tourism. However, it is a separate legal entity to the ministry and has its own financial account.

As is the case with all public universities in Vietnam, the university's highest decision-making body is its council (Vietnamese: hội đồng), led by a president (Vietnamese: chủ tịch hội đồng quản trị), currently Ms. Phạm Thị Thanh Tú. The university's day-to-day operation is headed by its principal (Vietnamese: hiệu trưởng), currently Dr. Đặng Thị Phong Lan.

The university is subject to inspections by the Ministry of Education and Training and publishes annual report of its finances and activities, as mandated by law.

== Notable alumni ==
=== Alumni of the École des Beaux-Arts de l’Indochine ===
Institution of 100 years (100th anniversary)

Students included Lê Phổ, Vũ Cao Đàm, Tô Ngọc Vân, Nguyễn Phan Chánh, the first to exhibit silk paintings in Paris in 1931, Nguyễn Gia Trí, known for his lacquer painting, the Roman Catholic painter Lê Văn Đệ, Nguyễn Tường Lân, the painter Lê Thị Lựu who emigrated to Paris, Nguyễn Sáng, Nguyễn Khang (painter), Huỳnh Văn Gấm, Phan Kế An, Dương Bích Liên and Tạ Tỵ.

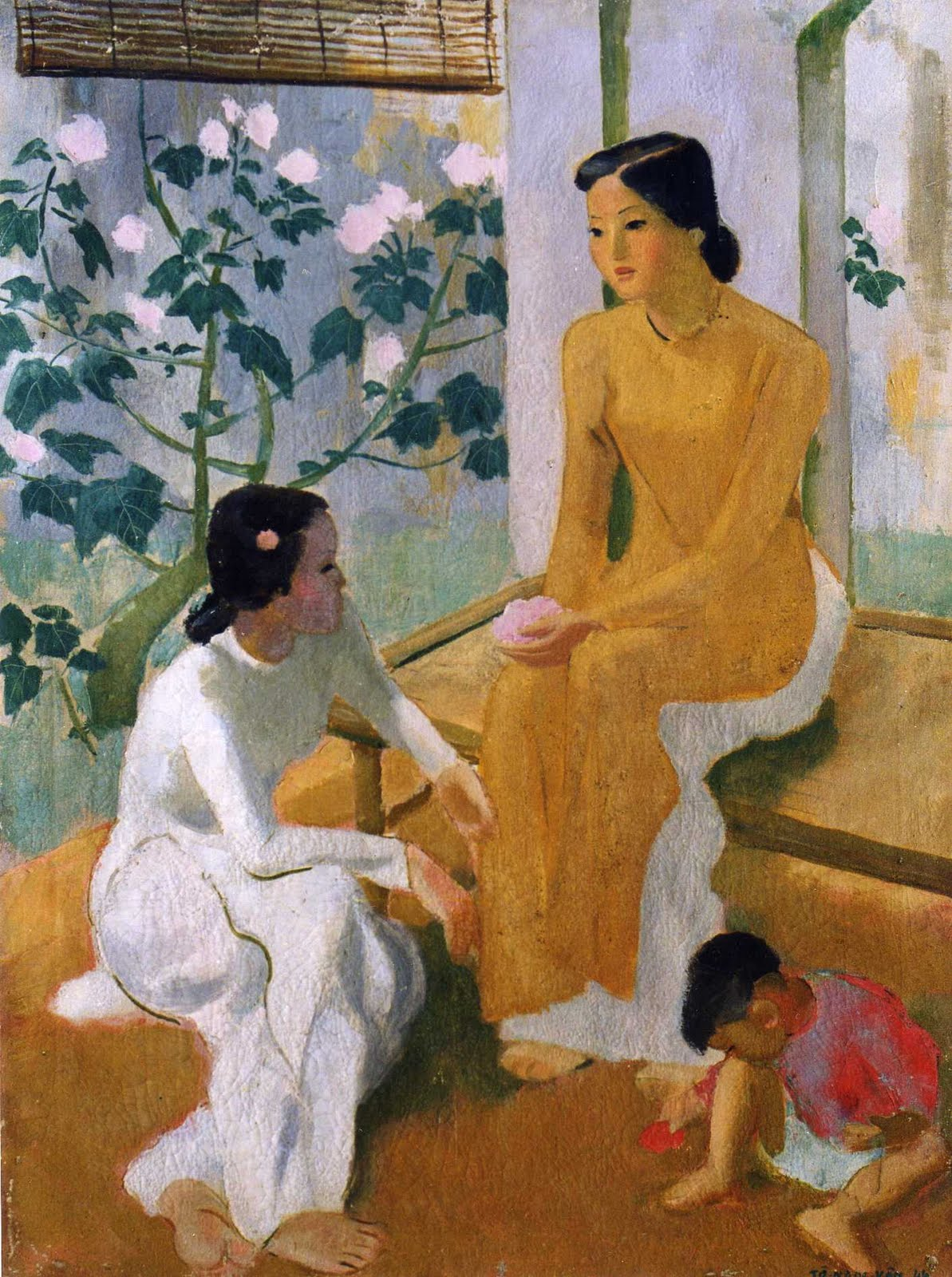
”Two ladies and a baby” by Tô Ngọc Vân, an alumn and former lecturer at the institution.

=== Alumni since 1945 ===
==== Alumni of Tô Ngọc Vân's Resistance Class ====
Graduates who studied in the resistance zone under Tô Ngọc Vân included Trần Lưu Hậu.

==== Alumni of Hanoi College of Fine Arts (1957–1975) ====
This cohort included Phạm Thanh Tâm, Phạm Đỗ Đồng and Bùi Quang Ánh.
