= Vietnam National Museum of Fine Arts =

Museum in Hanoi, Vietnam

Coordinates: 21.0306°N 105.837°E

- Vietnamese: Viện Bảo tàng Mỹ thuật Việt Nam; French: Musée des Beaux-Arts du Viêt Nam
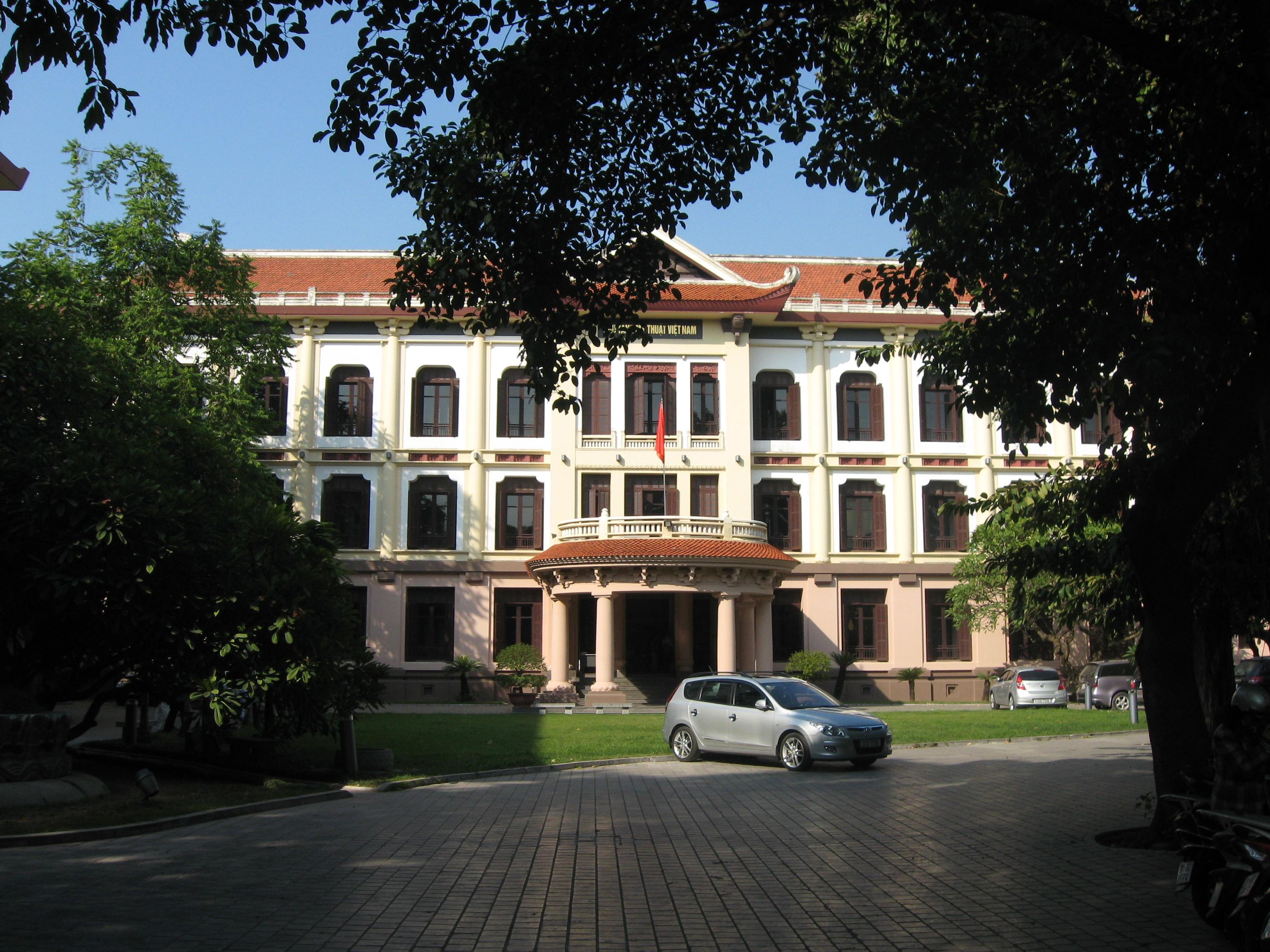
- View from the front entrance of the museum
- Established: 24 June 1966
- Location: Hanoi, Vietnam
- Type: Art museum
- Accreditation: International Council of Museums
- Key holdings: A selection of national treasures (Vietnamese: bảo vật quốc gia)
- Collection size: 20000 objects (2000 on display)
- Website: vnfam.vn/en/
- Area: 3,000 m^{2} (32,000 sq ft) across 2 buildings

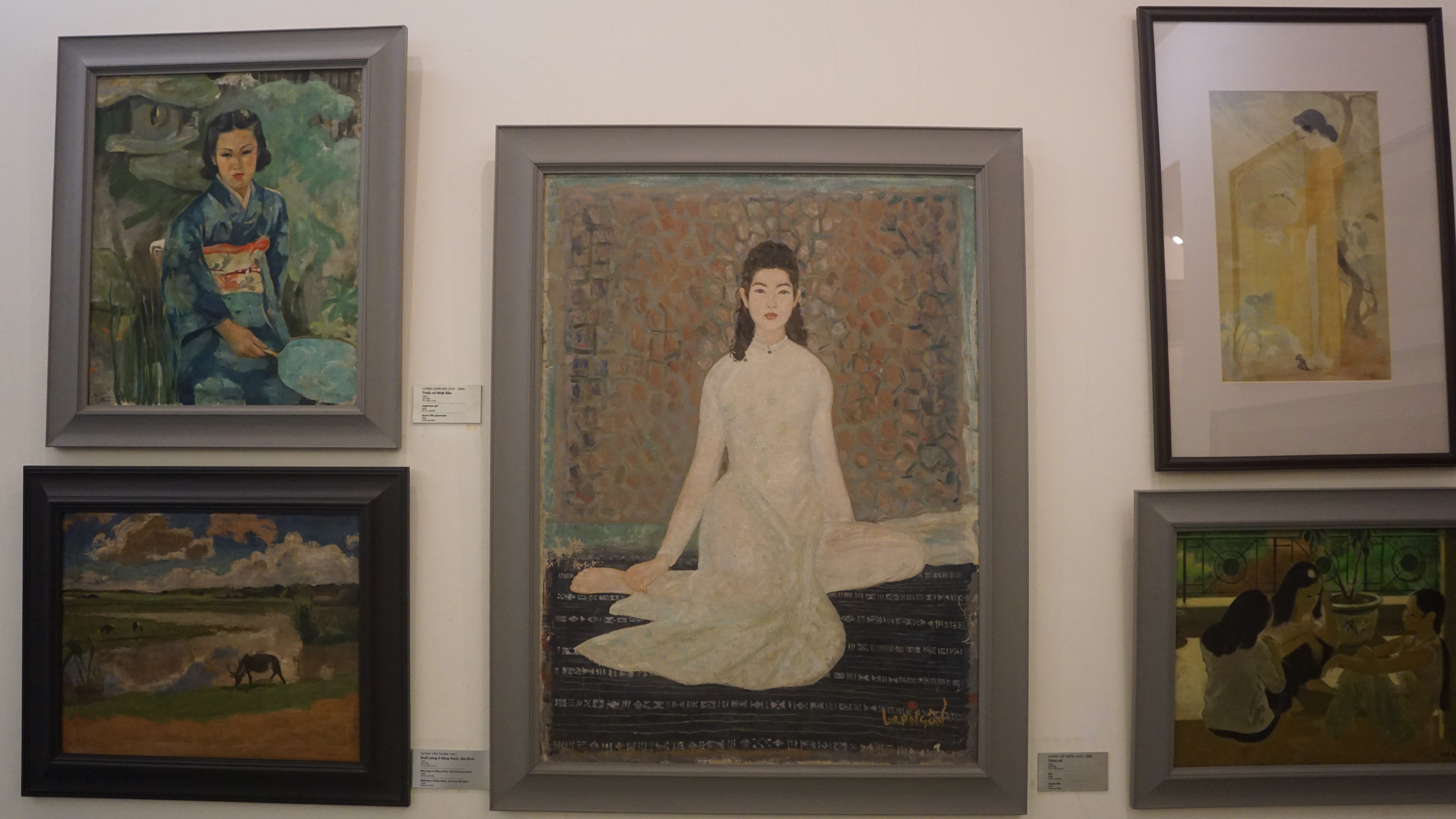
Paintings in Vietnam National Museum of Fine Arts

The Vietnam National Museum of Fine Arts (Vietnamese: Viện Bảo tàng Mỹ thuật Việt Nam; French: Musée des Beaux-Arts du Viêt Nam) is located in Hanoi, Vietnam. It is a museum showcasing Vietnam's fine arts from a range of historical periods. It is the country's primary art museum, the second being the smaller Ho Chi Minh City Museum of Fine Arts.

== History ==
The Museum exhibits Vietnam's fine arts from the Ancient time till the Modern time. Much of the 20th Century art presented in the museum is concerned with folk narratives of a nation in defence. As a collection it draws on themes of martyrdom, patriotism, military strategy and overcoming enemy incursion.

The museum presents a small collection of late 20th and early 21st Century painting, including works by artists exploring abstraction and abstract impressionism, giving greater attention to the individualist artist.

The site, 66 Nguyễn Thái Học Street, was selected by painter Nguyễn Đỗ Cung in 1963. The building, built in 1937, was an abandoned Catholic girl's boarding house. Next door at No. 65 was an artists' colony.
