= Vietnamese art =

Vietnamese art is visual art that, whether ancient or modern, originated in or is practiced in Vietnam or by Vietnamese artists. Vietnamese art has a long and rich history, the earliest examples of which date back as far as the Stone Age around 8,000 BCE.

With the millennium of Chinese domination starting in the 2nd century BCE, Vietnamese art undoubtedly absorbed many Chinese influences, which would continue even following independence from China in the 10th centuryCE. However, Vietnamese art has always retained many distinctively Vietnamese characteristics.

By the 19th century, the influence of French art took hold in Vietnam, having a large hand in the birth of modern Vietnamese art.

== Traditional art ==
=== Prehistoric art ===
Pottery dating to the Stone Age (c. 8000 BCE) has been found in Bắc Sơn, Vietnam. This pottery was made from clay, and in its beginnings was largely basic and lacking any artistic flare. Moving into the Neolithic era Vietnamese pottery and ceramics started to develop rapidly, showing signs of decor.

=== Ancient art ===
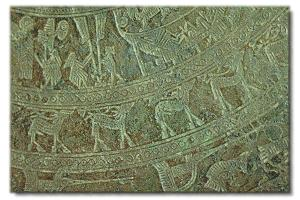
Motif on a Dong Son drum, circa 300 BCE

The highly developed Đông Sơn culture that flourished in North Vietnam (from about 1000 BC to the 4th century BC) was the civilization responsible for the world-famous Đông Sơn drums, a product of their advanced bronze-casting skills.

These drums give us an important insight into early Vietnamese life. They were elaborately decorated with geometric patterns, and most importantly, depicted scenes of everyday life such as farming, warriors donning feather headdresses, construction of ships, musicians, etc.

Archaeological evidence from this period also shows that people in the area had long been weaving cloth. Many of the people depicted on the drums are shown as wearing elaborate clothing.

=== Chinese period (111 BCE-938 CE) ===
During the ten centuries of rule by the Chinese, Vietnamese began to apply newly learned Chinese techniques to art and specifically ceramics, however this was in conjunction with the continued production of art based on native methods; this is proven by excavation of Chinese tombs in the area.

=== Dynastic art ===
==== Lý-Trần-Hồ period (968-1407) ====
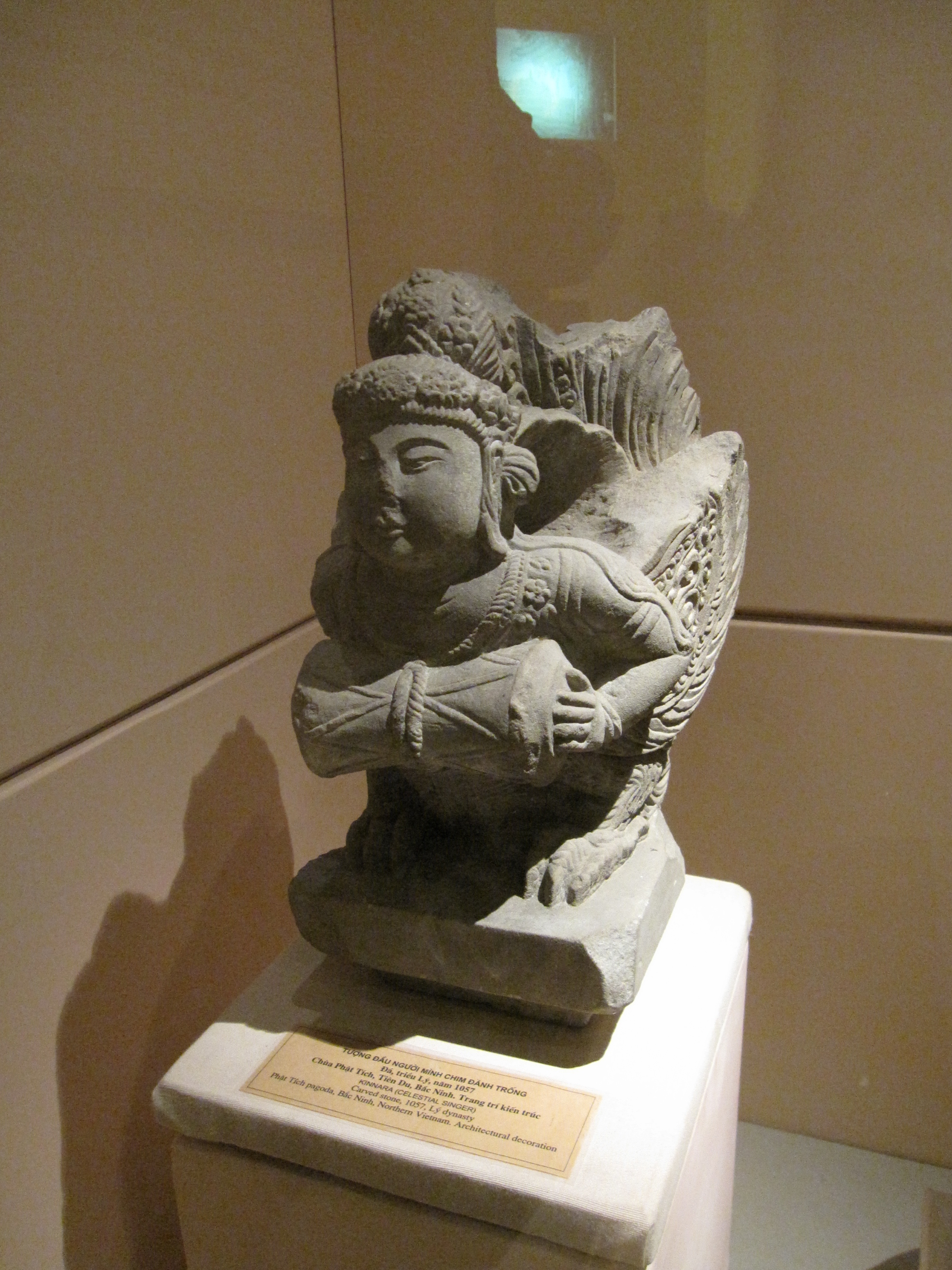
Left image: Vietnamese kinnara figure, circa 1057.
Right image: Vietnamese glazed stoneware jar, circa 1200s

Vietnamese art and ceramics during this period of independence (approximately 10th to 15th centuries) flourished. The ceramics from this period were thought to have been largely influenced by both ancient native styles and the Tang and later Song dynasty's art, including applying the "three colors" concept to its ceramics. Chinese-influenced philosophies adopted by the Vietnamese such as Confucianism, Mahayana Buddhism and Taoism all had a lasting impression on Vietnamese art. Some also claim there are small traces of Cham influences to be found as well.

The Lý dynasty, beginning in the 11th century is viewed specifically as the golden age of Vietnamese art, and its ceramics became famous across East and Southeast Asia. The Lý dynasty also saw the construction of many of Vietnam's landmark structures, including the Temple of Literature, One Pillar Pagoda, and Quỳnh Lâm Temple. The Trần dynasty that immediately followed in the 13th century saw a more subdued approach to art.

==== Lê period (1428-1802) ====
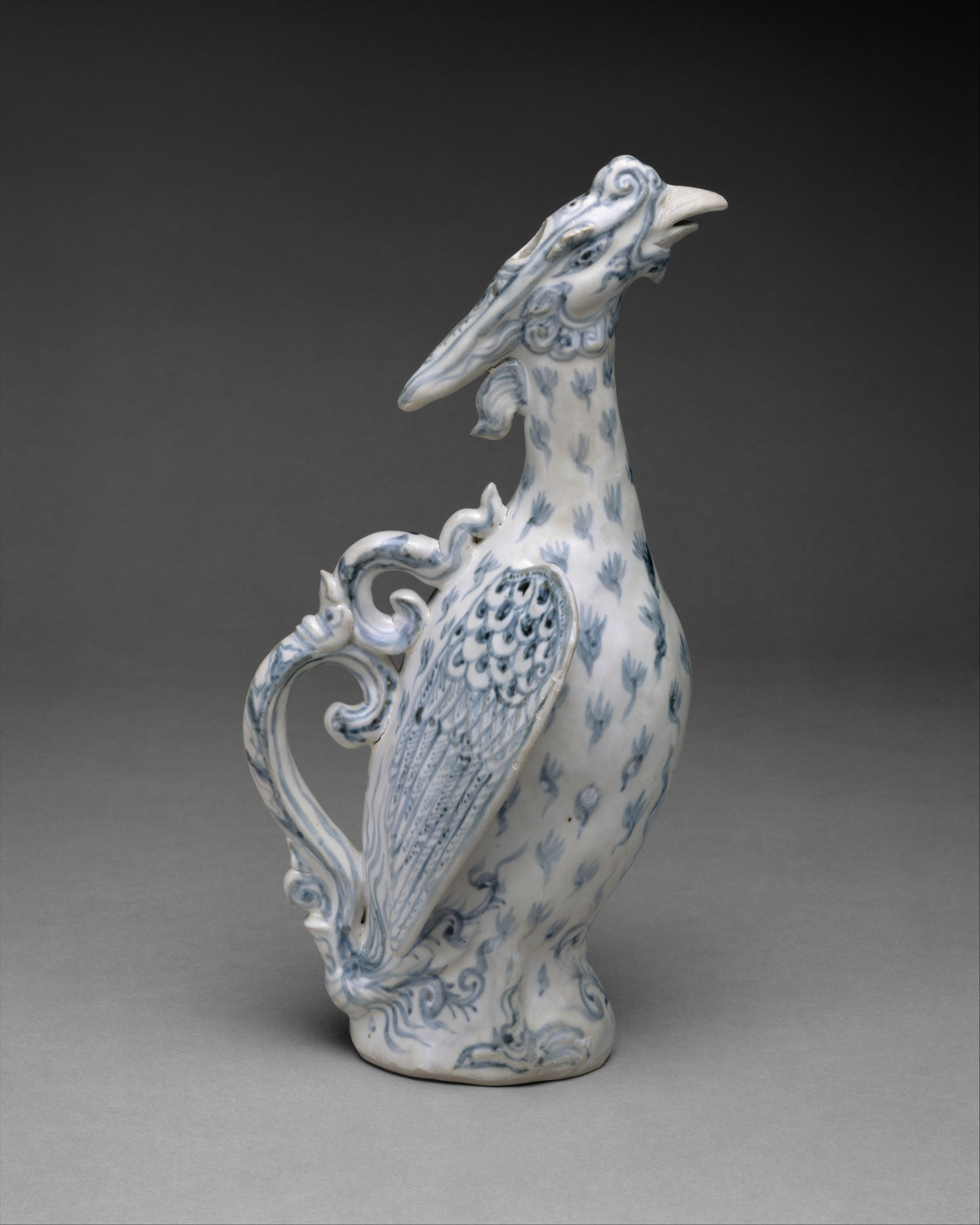
Left image: Viet plate depicting peacocks on early plum branch, circa 1450-1550s.
Right image: Viet ewer in the shape of phoenix, circa 1450s

The fourth Chinese domination of Vietnam was quite short-lived, lasting only about two decades, yet it was also seen as the harshest domination. Many if not most classical Vietnamese books were burnt, and thus much documentation of the era of independence lost. It is said that a more extreme than-ever process of sinicization was enforced, and countless Vietnamese resources and goods were removed and taken to China.

==== Nguyễn period (1802-1945) ====
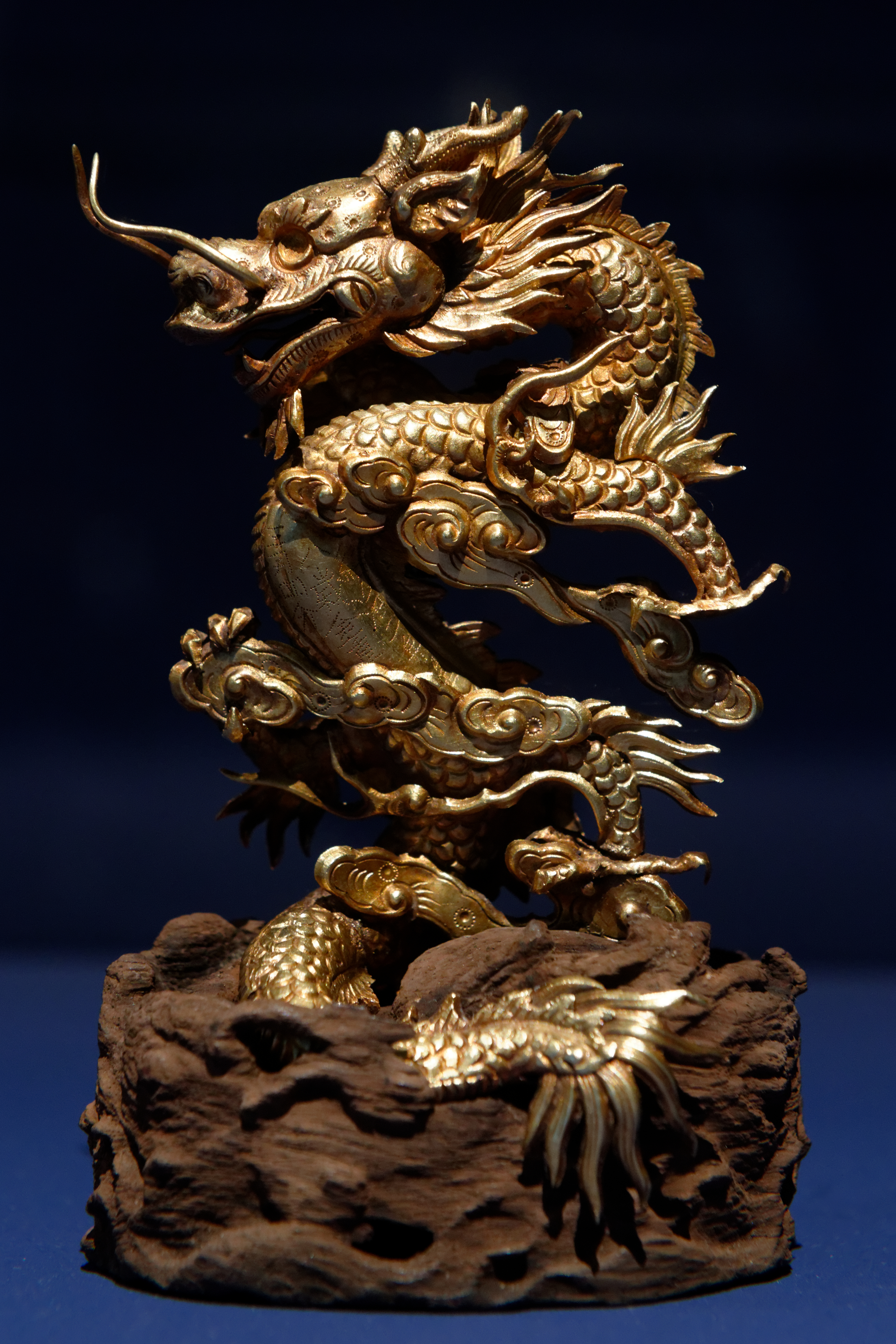
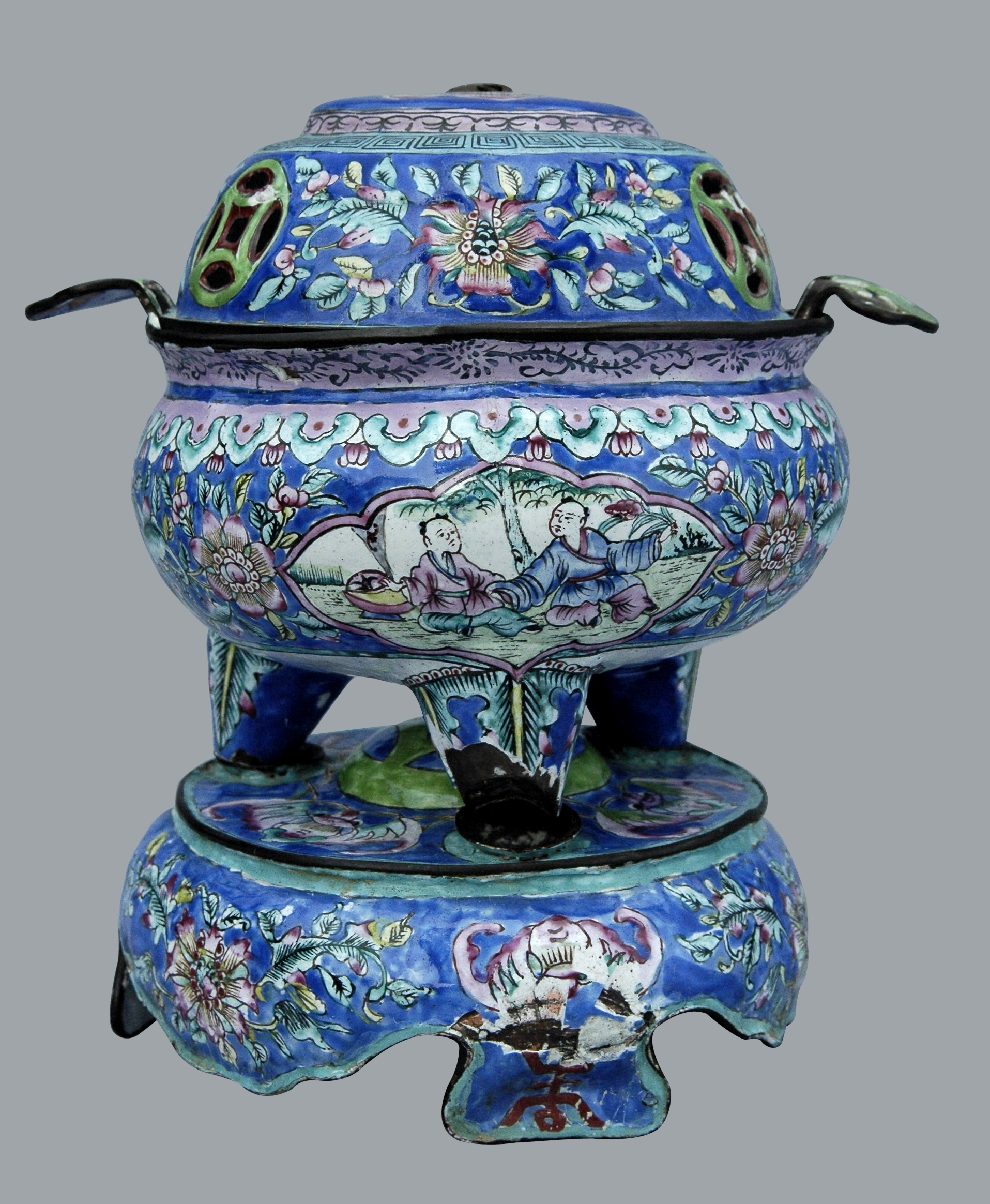
Left image: Viet dragon, circa 1842.
Right image: Viet enamel burner, circa 1845.

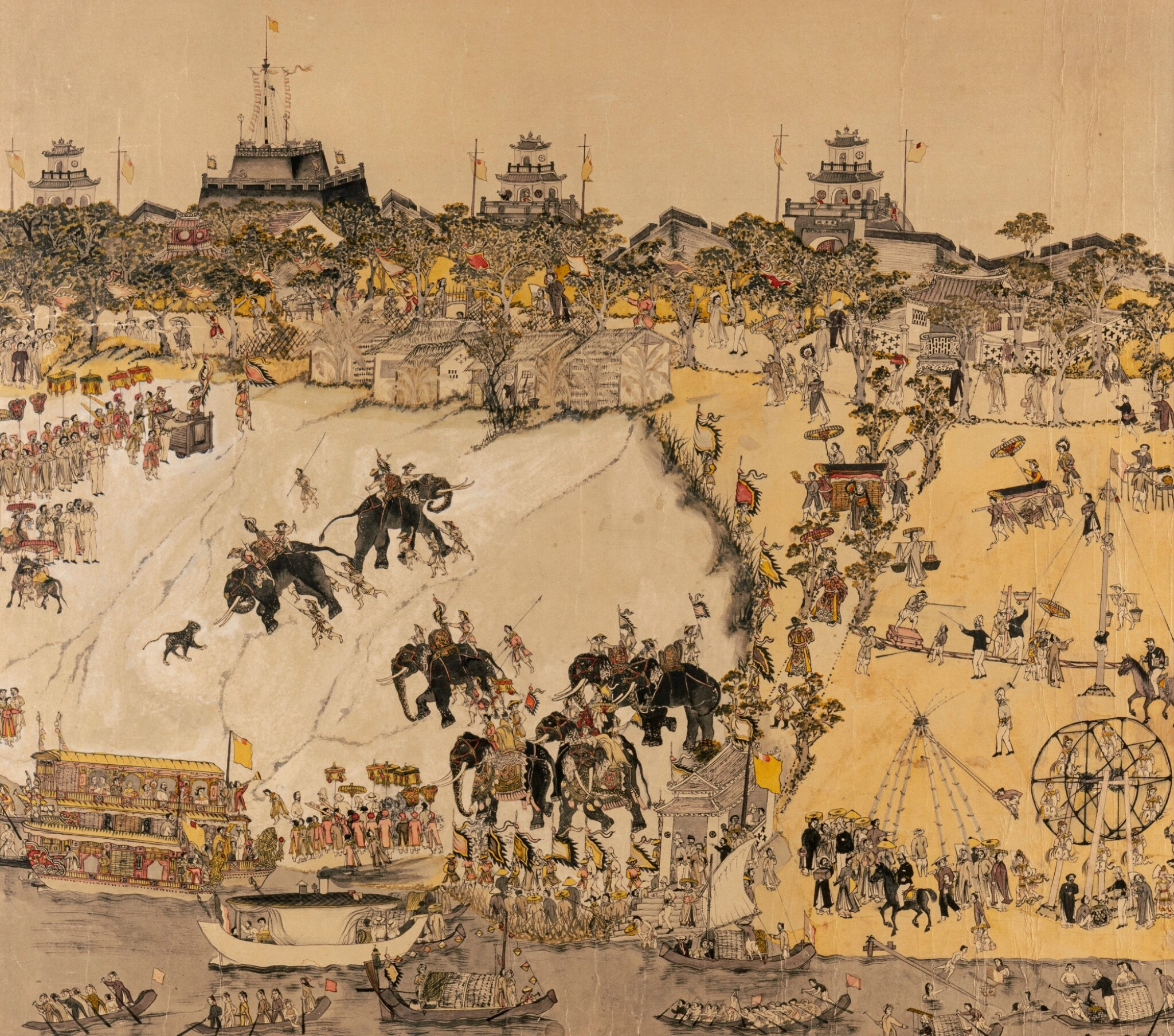
A painting depicts the festival scene in Huế

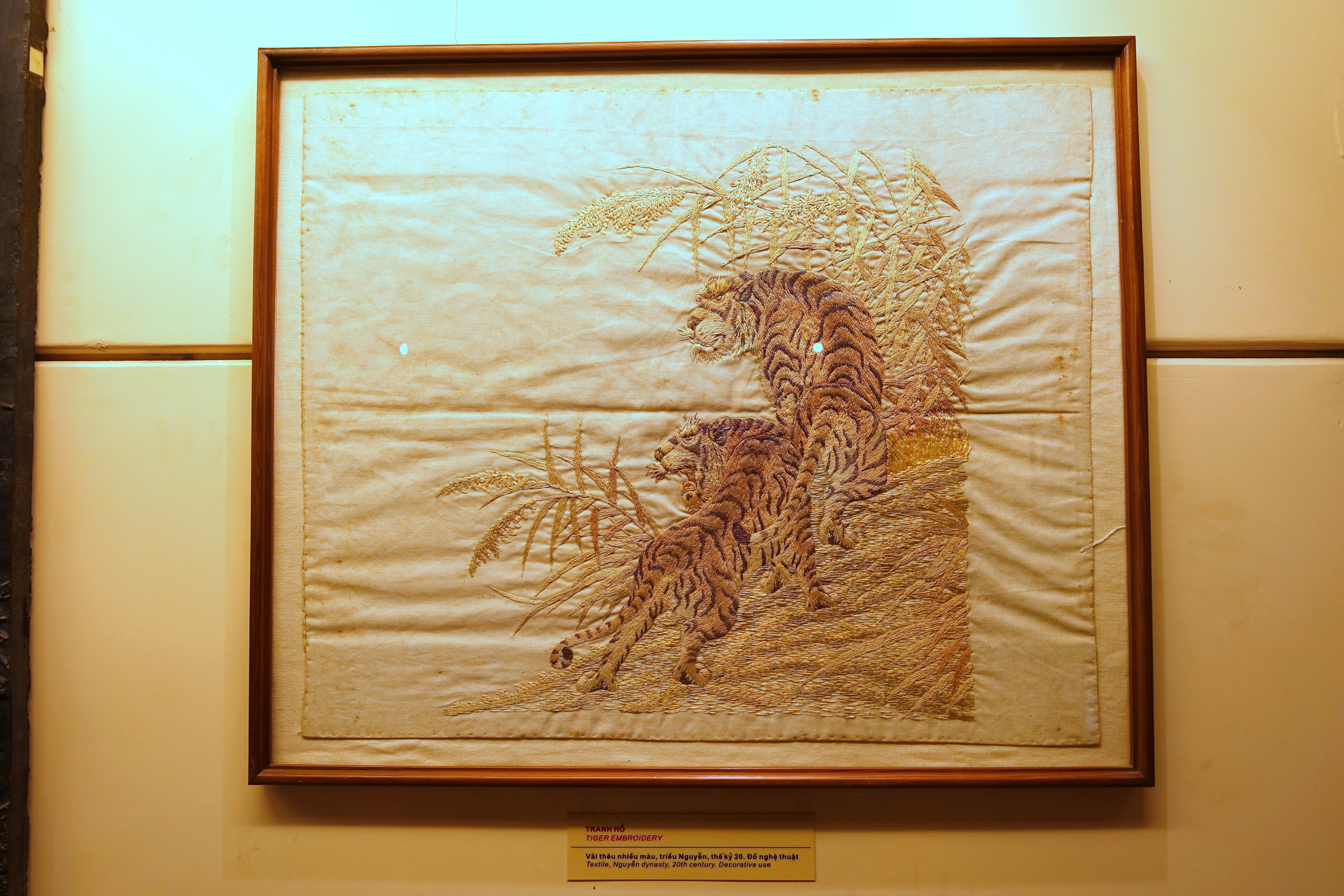
Tigers posing (19th century embroidery)

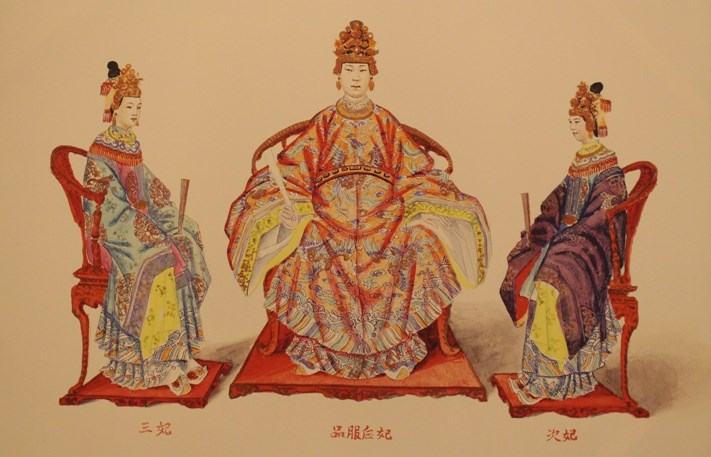
Paintings of costumes of the empress and concubines of the Nguyễn dynasty (the picture has no reference value in terms of costumes)

The Nguyễn dynasty, the last ruling dynasty of Vietnam, saw a renewed interest in ceramics and porcelain art. Imperial courts across Asia imported Vietnamese ceramics.

Despite how highly developed the performing arts (such as imperial court music and dance) became during the Nguyễn dynasty, some view other fields of arts as beginning to decline during the latter part of the Nguyễn dynasty.

== Modern art ==
Vietnamese modern art includes artistic work made during the colonial period between the 1860s and 1970s, much of it after the founding of "Ecole Supérieure des Beaux-Arts de l'Indochine" in October 1925. Before 1925, paintings and carvings were mainly created for religious purpose, in a decorative manner for example lacquered furniture and utilitarian ceramic and porcelains, subordinated to demands by the local temples and pagodas use.

A striking "shift" was obvious after the founding of Ecole des Beaux-Arts de l'Indochine or "EBAI", observing a gradual change in perception of art, and the beginning recognition of art for art's sake. Vietnamese artists experimented with new ways of seeing, with ideas from two important French teachers, it marks an intensifying cultural transfer and modernity.

=== New Vietnamese Art (1925–1945) ===
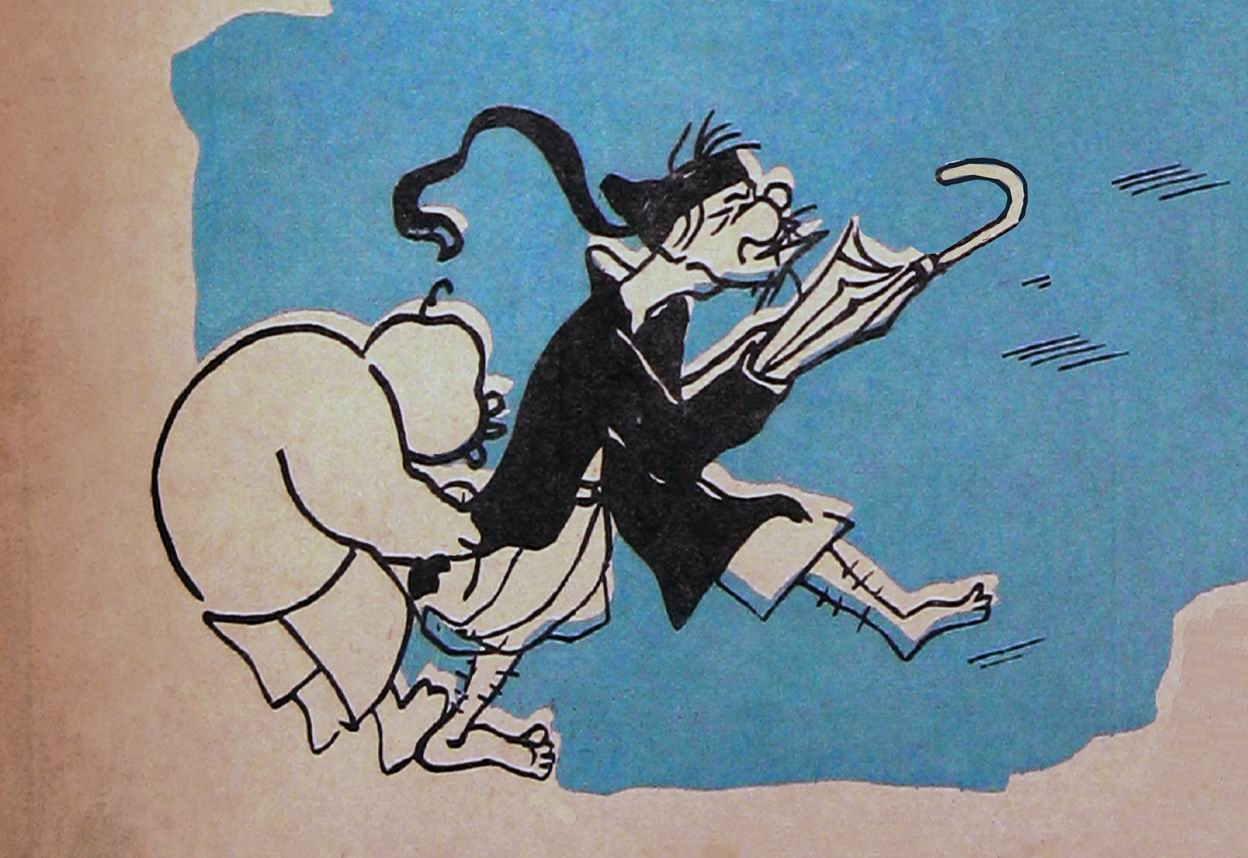
A cartoon illustration in Phong Hóa

Ecole des Beaux-Arts de l'Indochine EBAI was founded by Victor Tardieu, a French academic and naturalist painter. With a report commission sent to the general Government of Indochina, Victor Tardieu recommended setting up a school "EBAI in Indochina" to train real artists. Unlike, Ecole professionnelle" in Hanoi, "Ecole des Arts Cambodgeins" and three other schools set up in Cochinchina between 1902 and 1913, these schools were professional schools to train craftsmen. Tardieu's idea was to adapt existing curriculum used in "Ecole des Beaux-Arts in Paris" by including art history; technical course like oil painting and perspective, to train student into real artist. He planned to "help the Vietnamese artist to get back in touch with the deep meaning and fundamental inspiration of their own traditions".

The magazine publications Ngày Nay (Today) and Phong Hoá (Mores) which were associated with Tự Lực văn đoàn (Self Reliance Literary Association), were committed to modernising Vietnamese culture through the crucial assessment of both Vietnam's tradition and Western modernity. Students in the EBAI were columnists in these two weekly magazines, illustrating cartoons and exhibition information. The stylized cartoon illustration were in fact very modern, depicting simple messages.

==== Oil painting ====
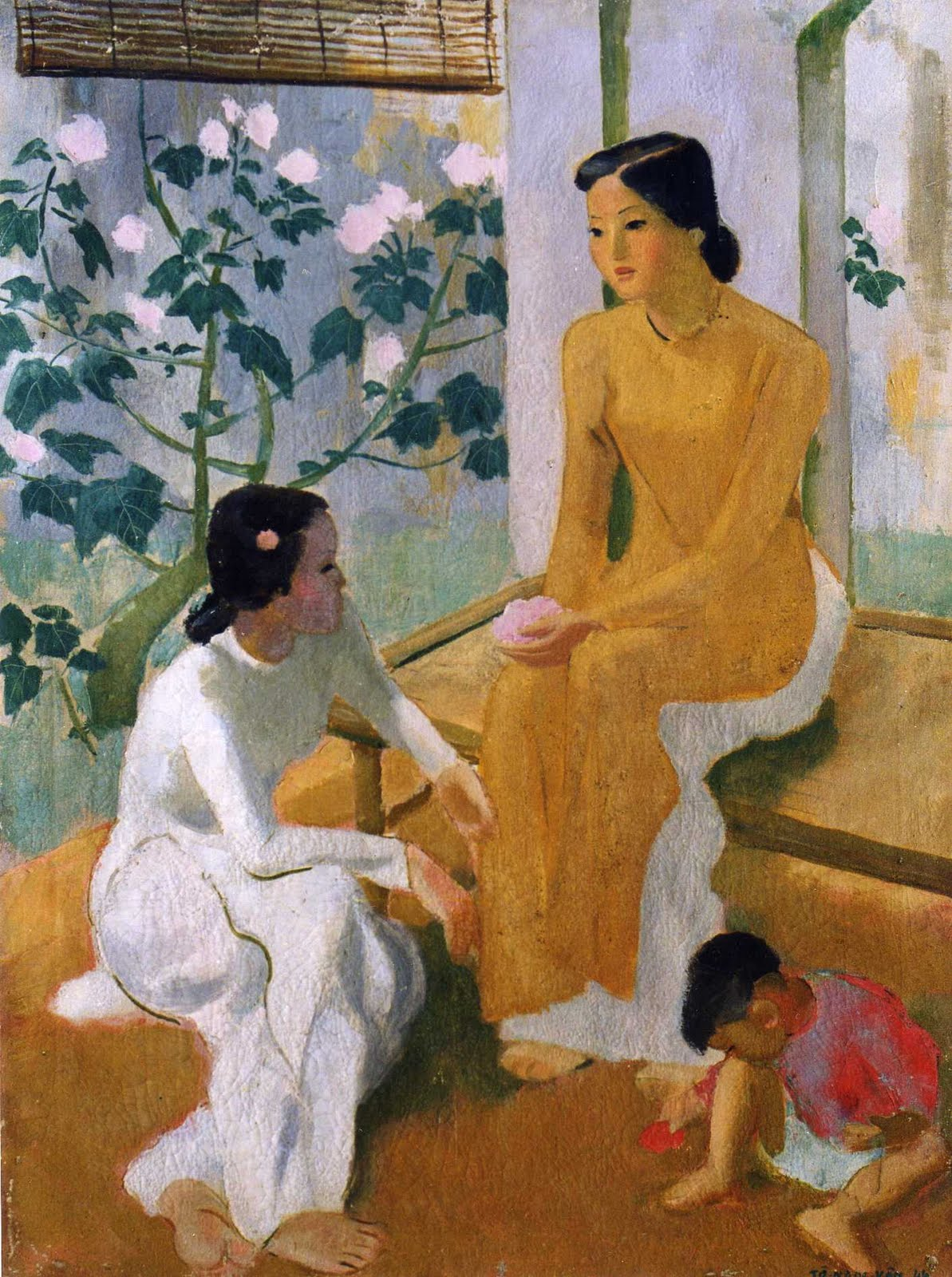
Tô Ngọc Vân, Deux Jeunes filles et un enfants, 1944, oil on canvas, Vietnam National Museum of Fine Arts, Hanoi

Following closely to the curriculum of Ecole des Beaux-Arts de Paris, oil painting was first introduced to students as a completely new medium. Although western art, in this case, oil painting, was likely first encountered by Le Van Mien (1873–1943) in L'Ecole Nationale Superieure des Beaux – Arts de Paris, who returned to Hanoi in 1895, no record shows that he taught and trained craftsman in Bien Hoa or Gia Dinh this western medium. This medium was thoroughly unknown to the students, and Joseph Inguimberty though it would be hard to assimilate the oil painting techniques to them. Artist like Tô Ngọc Vân was able to combine western aesthetic techniques like linear perspective, imitation of nature and modelling in the round into his own oriental traditions with oil medium. Stylized as the 'poetic reality' style, his works sets female ideals into a linear perspective in an enclosed space, juxtapositioned with flat coloured area, his works emulates with the tendency idealization imagery.

==== En Plein Air ====
Similarly, en plein air was another major practice instituted in EBAI's curriculum. Students were brought outdoor for field trips to develop their painting sense of the environment. As noted by art historian Nora Taylor,

"[He … propped his easel under a tree by rice paddy, took off his shirt and proceeded to sketch farmers planting their rice seedlings. Needless to say he earned quite a few giggles and embarrassed glances from his subjects.' Nobody took off their shirts in public, not even the farmers in the fields. The French did and so did Tô Ngọc Vân."

This example quoted by Taylor, argues that the tendency of idealization, we see in Tô Ngọc Vân's painting reflects a distancing and detachment with the subject matter, a result of artist's attempt to emulate their French teachers inclusive of whatever they do.

Other than oil medium and en plein air painting method, significant assimilation and adaption of local culture were encouraged by Victor Tardieu and his successor Joseph Imguimberty.

==== Lacquer painting ====
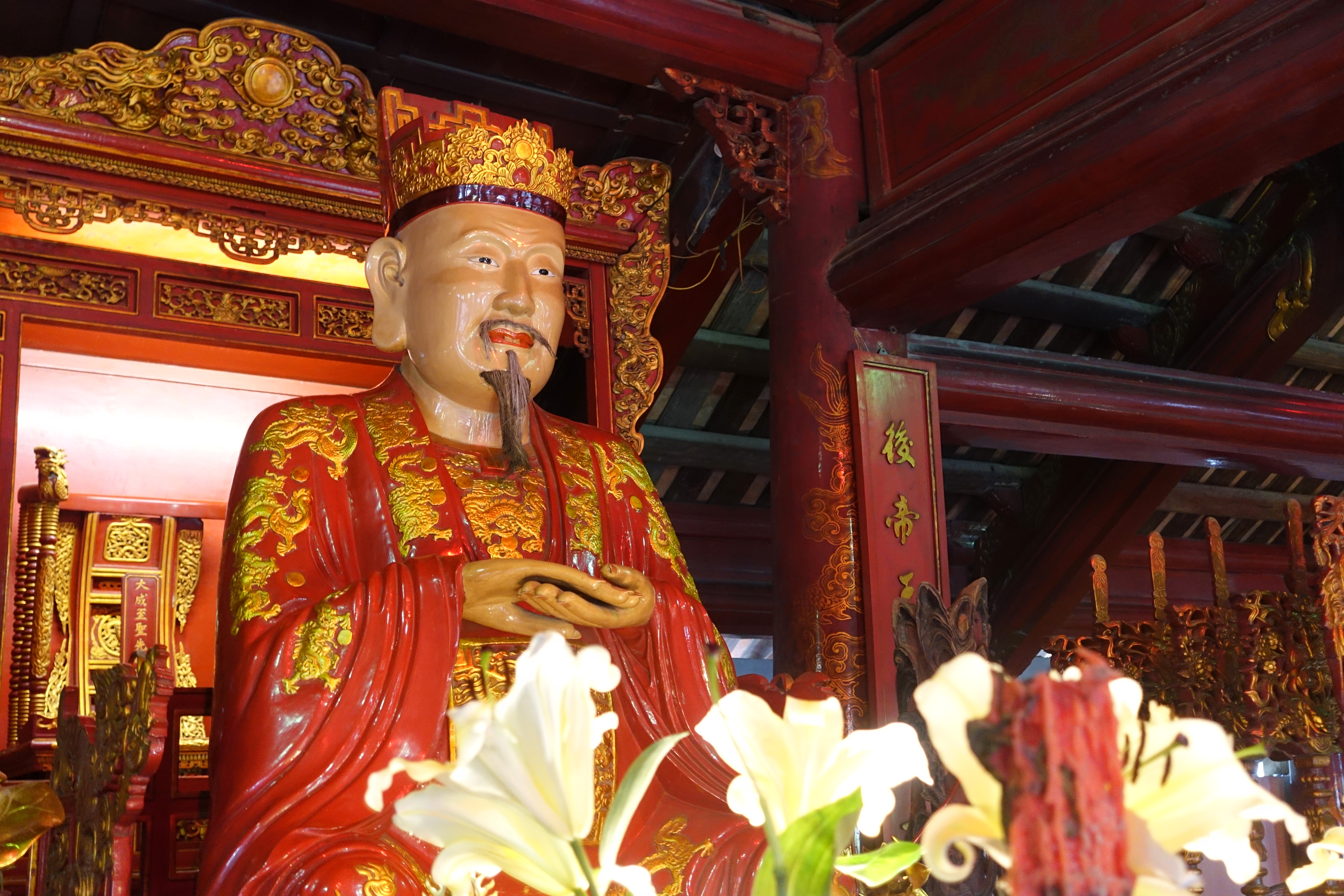
Interior of Temple of Literature

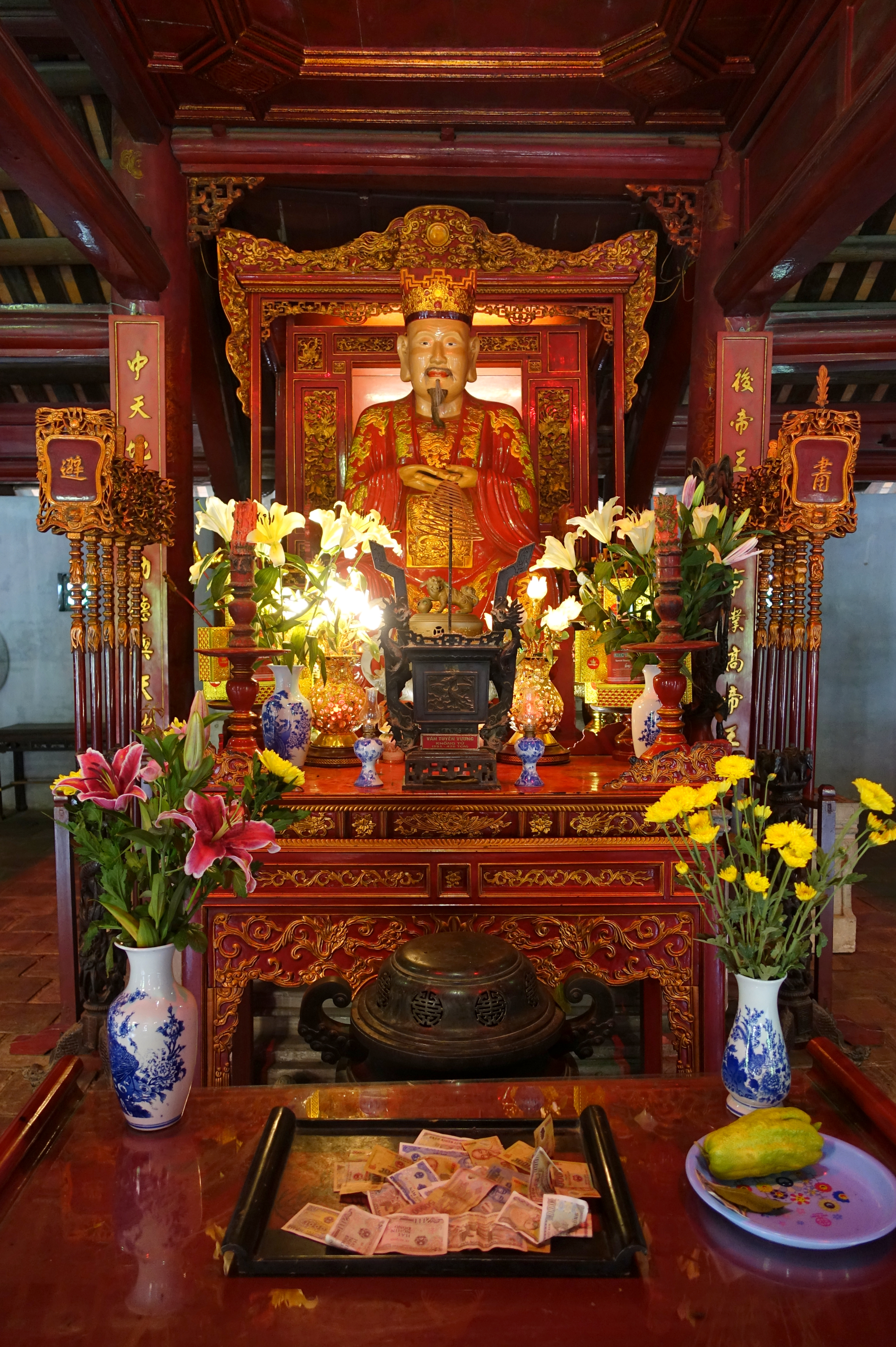
The wares placed on altar were lacquered wares that inspired Joseph Imguimberty to plan a workshop for lacquer painting the students in EBAI.

Joseph Imguimberty was fascinated by the lacquered cultural objects and architecture fixtures after visiting the Temple of Literature in Hanoi. He encouraged his students to start using lacquer as a fine art medium, and set up workshops in EBAI with old artisans, playing a renaissance role in Lacquer painting.

"falling back on the past will be efficient only if it is used as a starting point for a new research, for an evolution in line with the contemporary eras; to summarise, the question is to evolve as contemporaries within an extensive of tradition." Victor Tardieu

Lacquer painting by Nguyễn Gia Trí shows distinctive French influence of "romantic realism" style, yet a blend of localized culture iconography within the work

Making lacquer painting takes several months, using resin from Son tree taken from the plantation from Sơn Mài region, numerous layers of application are applied to acquire the desired colour and effects. Most notable artist who excelled in this medium is Nguyễn Gia Trí. Although artists like Trần Quang Trân, Lê Phổ, Phạm Hầu, Nguyễn Khang and Nguyễn Văn Quế attempted lacquer painting, Nguyễn Gia Trí's achievement in lacquer painting is remarkable for his research on pigments and exploration of new lacquer colours. Nguyễn Gia Trí's aim " was to obtain the same level of painting as with the oil medium regarding perspective, modelling in the round, and infinite variation of colours".

==== Silk painting ====
Lê Phổ silk painting styled closely similar to a classic "Madonna nursing baby" triangle composition

Other artists like Nguyễn Phan Chánh, Lê Phổ, Mai Trung Thứ, Trần Văn Cẩn, and Lê Văn Đệ, who were the first batch of students to be admitted in EBAI, are most notable for their silk painting.

Like lacquer painting, silk painting was much encouraged for exploration in the school. Different from similar practice of silk painting in China and Japan, an intensifying of cultural transfer was observed in Vietnamese silk painting, artists like Nguyễn Phan Chánh blended western composition principle with eastern tradition like calligraphy and brush paintings.

Nguyễn Phan Chánh, Chơi ô ăn quan, 1931

In 1931, Paris International Colonial Exhibition, Nguyễn Phan Chánh's work titled Children Playing a Game of Squares was well-received and this recognition firmly established the medium as a modern Vietnamese expression.

Between 1930 and 1936, Nguyễn Phan Chánh, Lê Phổ, Mai Trung Thứ and Nguyễn Gia Trí, graduated from EBAI. Victor Tardieu died in 1937 and he was taken after by Evariste Jonchere. Tô Ngọc Vân begin teaching in EBAI in 1937. Artists like Bùi Xuân Phái and Nguyễn Tư Nghiêm who entered EBAI in 1941 was unable to complete the full five-year programme due to the 1945 revolution.

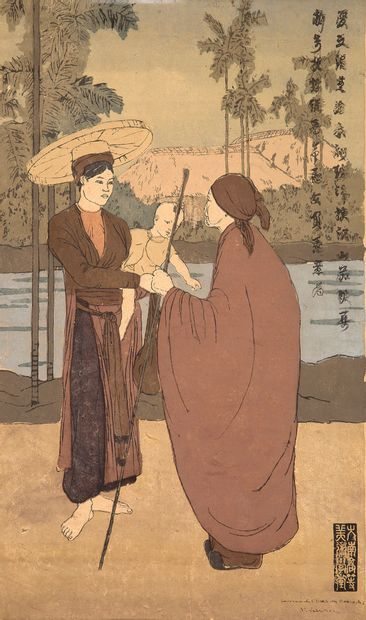
Nhất Linh, La Tonkinoise Et La Vieille Sage, 1926

An Allied bombing raid of Hanoi that was intended for Japanese target destroyed part of the EBAI painting department in 1943, resulting the sculpture department to be moved to Sơn Tây; architecture and sculpture department to Dalat while applied arts went to Phủ Lý.

=== Indochina wars (1945–1975) ===
The end of the Second World War marked the official close down of EBAI in 1945. The Democratic Republic of Vietnam reopened a fine arts school in Hanoi for a short period of time in September 1945 ruled by To Ngoc Van. However, artists were sympathetic of the Viet Minh and decided to leave Hanoi to join the resistance movement against French in the Hills of Tay Bac.

==== Artists in the North ====
Notable group of artists in the North during the Cold War were Tô Ngọc Vân, Trần Văn Cẩn, Huỳnh Phương Đông, Phạm Thanh Tâm, Diệp Minh Tuyền, Hòang Trung. Another small number of artists from well-to-do backgrounds had the opportunity to go to France and make their careers there for the most part. Examples include Lê Thị Lựu, Lê Phổ, Mai Trung Thứ, Lê Văn Đệ, Lê Bá Đảng and Phạm Tăng.

When Ho Chi Minh declared Vietnam's independence on 2 September 1945, Vietnamese artist begin to resist the influence of romantic realism, tendency for nostalgia past and melancholic dreams. Artist like Tô Ngọc Vân shook off his romantic style and turned towards modern realism, he moved the closed EBAI (after the Japanese coup de force in March 1945) to Việt Bắc in 1950, the military base of the Revolutionary Army under Hồ Chí Minh.

"[He]… decided that art, as the French saw it, died in 1945 when Việt Nam declared its independence and was reborn in 1946 when the Viet Minh moved the art school to the hills of Việt Bắc, the seat of the revolutionary movement. In 1946, he declared proudly 'tradition starts now.'"

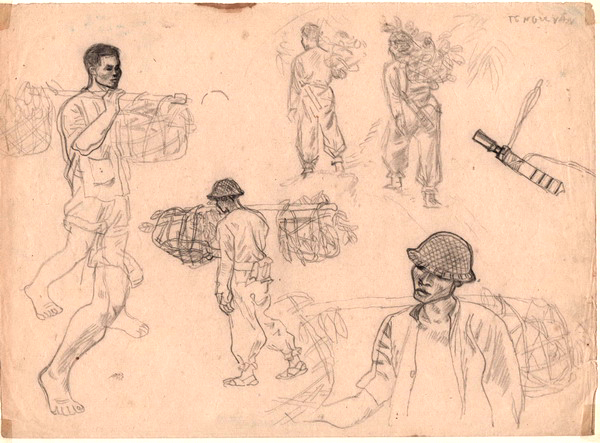
Tô Ngọc Vân's painting style changed drastically away from the usual ideal women he painted before the First Indochina war.

Tô Ngọc Vân begin teaching resistance art classes in the Northern zone during the war with the French. This includes setting up the "School of Fine Arts in the Resistance Zone", and combating against decadent art being scientific, national and popular, art have to abandon religion, mythical and idealists theme, focusing solely on the inspiration and needs of the revolution and being appealing and educational to a majority of people. Hence artists like Nguyen Hiem, Nguyễn Sáng, Phan Văn Đôn and Trần Văn Cẩn created works that depicted the countrysides, portraits of peasants, soldiers battles scenes, they uphold the belief that artist should show the reality of society instead of idealised imageries. Tô Ngọc Vân died in 1954 as the result of injuries received at the Battle of Điện Biên Phủ, School of Fine Arts in the Resistance Zone was later moved to Hanoi in 1955 and named as the "Vietnam College of Fine Arts" with Trần Văn Cẩn as the principal.

Mai Văn Hiến, Meeting (Gặp Nhau), gouache on paper, 1954

First National Art Exhibition in the Democratic Republic of Vietnam in 1955, after the victory at Điện Biên Phủ where Meeting (Gặp Nhau) by Mai Văn Hiến was praised as the ideal painting that illustrates the idea of community and solidarity between the soldiers and the common people. "The mood of the painting is reflected in the artist's simple descriptive style, which lends itself well to its content."

In a Painting Exhibition that in happened December 10, 1951, Ho Chi Minh sent a message to the artists that "you, in the artistic field, have your own responsibilities - to serve the resistance, the Fatherland and the people, first and foremost the workers, peasants and soldiers."

However, various debates erupted in Hanoi on the role of artists in Society in 1956, during the first meeting of the writers and artist associations, members demanded for greater freedom of expression which went against what Ho Chi Minh had earlier laid down. Two art and literature journals Nhân văn (Humanism) and Giai Phẩm (Art Works) that supported the argument were subsequently banned.

Following year, Vietnam Association of Fine Arts in Hanoi or National Arts Association was established with 108 member headed by Thái Bá Vân. These members were required to be members of the association if they wished their works to be exhibited or sold. There were no private galleries where artists can displayed their work formally. Eventually, this association was governed with official rules and regulations, members are obligated to hold one exhibition at local level annually and another at national level every 5 years. Non members were not considered artist, hence they have no opportunity to display any form of art publicly.

Between 1950 and the 1970s, members were paid as "art workers" for the poster designs and illustrations, among few were elites who painted paintings for state visitors.

Realist style, which corresponded with Northern artists initial aspirations, was vital in the early days of revolution, however, due to the strict constraints by the DVR regime and decreasing subsidies, realist trend reached an apex in the 1960s. Strict guidelines were attempted to established in 1962, on the productions of artists artworks, they need to portray a "National Character", subject matters were usually the countryside, battle scene, portrait of Uncle Ho.

==== National Paintings ====
Anti-colonial and resistance war culminated the appropriation of "national" art. It was a period to essentially erase the impact and influence of the French. Works painted by Nam Sơn, Trần Văn Cẩn, Nguyễn Sáng, Trần Đông Lương were in fact in the medium Lacquer, silk and oil medium. The 3 media, encouraged and culturally transferred by the French during colonial period were renamed as "national".

Trần Văn Cẩn, Female Militia in the Sea, 1960

In Trần Văn Cẩn's Portrait painting "Militia women of a coastal region", the artist depicted a robust figure and confronting gaze, she is a comrade ready to face the enemy. It is a politically correct painting, filled with characteristic that fulfills the national painting.

Another theme commonly captured by artist was the landscape around Việt Bắc. In the Diệp Minh Châu's "Uncle Ho's House in Việt Bắc" show clear proficiency with the medium oil painting, the impressionist strokes of capturing the light through filtering leaves.

In Dương Hứơng Minh's "Hauling Up Canons" a work on lacquer captures dramatic scene of soldiers hauling heavy weapons up a steep slope. The bravery of the men eventually brought the Viet Minh their victory against the French in Điện Biên Phủ.

Phạm Thanh Tâm, Approaching Khe Sanh, 1967

Similarly, in watercolour painting painted by Phạm Thanh Tâm during resistance war "shows a clear French influence. His professors in the resistance zone were trained from the EBAI" the drawings and diary clearly contents "lyrical and poetic quality" it was regarded as ideal paintings.

Hence, art curator Joyce Fan argues that "the realist techniques thus imparted by the French continue to manifest in the paintings with the sense of detachment and distancing, unlike the social realist use of emotive values to heighten the pathos in the imagery." Likewise, the undeniable fact that, the intense cultural transfer during colonial period continues to influence local artist after the exit of the French.

==== Propaganda posters ====
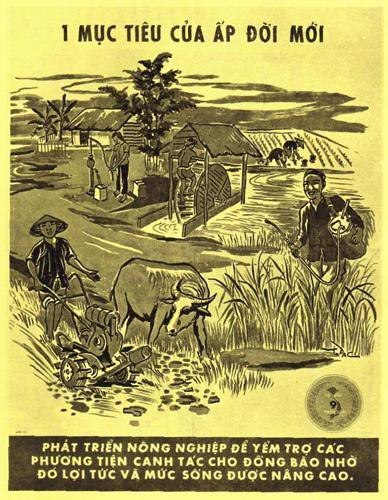
A South Vietnamese propaganda poster depicting the countryside

Propaganda poster painted during the period of "operation rolling thunder" in 1965 reflects a clear anti-colonial and anti-imperial messages. Likely inspired by the Soviets and Communist Chinese, they carried a political intention. Following strictly to the culture of new Vietnam in Ho Chi Minh's concept, was to "stimulate intellectual and artistic creativity for art and cultural development".^{[23]}

"Culture is seen as a powerful motor of development, and cultural identity as a constant in the harmonious development of society and the individual."

"images such as those presented in the propaganda posters and paintings of the time were key indicators of how the population was to perceive the environment, the government, and the future. the posters and paintings were sometimes the only voices the people heard, the only clues they had to knowing and how to respond."

==== Artists in the South ====
Vietnam was divided at the 17 parallel after the Geneva Conference in 1954, separating themselves into the Soviet and Chinese supported North against the Southern Republic reinforced by the United States of America. This divided Vietnam forced some artists to fled to Saigon and continue their practices in the republic of Vietnam, most notable artist is Tạ Tỵ, who "considerably bolstered the South's artistic development in the following years and profoundly contributed to the foundation of the Young Artists Association in 1966, though he chose to remain anonymous in its list of founding members due to privacy reasons."

Nguyen Gia Tri decided to move to Gia Định and eventually became the director for "Ecole des beaux-art in Gia Định" founded in 1954. Evident in their works, due to accessibility of information, their artworks were styled as western influenced, more eclectic, experimental, subjective and individualism. They enjoyed more freedom in the subject matters and exhibited freely until 1975.

In 1962, the first international Exhibition of Fine Arts of Saigon was held with 21 countries participating it. Southern artist encountered abstract painting for the first time. Following up, a second exhibition was planned for 1966, but unfortunately cancelled due to the increase intensity of the war. In 1966, Saigon Society of Young Artist (Hội Họa sĩ trẻ Sài Gòn) was founded campaigning to develop modern art, members include Nguyễn Trung and Trịnh Cung.

During the 1960s to 1970s, artists in Saigon experimented abstraction and other contemporary expressions. As noted by Vietnamese art historian Huỳnh-Beattie, Southern artists did not readily accepted and took in American culture, which they deem as inferior to the French. Although Americans were heavily involved in Saigon, Beattie argues that little had influenced on the art scene in republic.

After the reunification of Vietnam, southern artists were sent for re-education in 1975.

1976, Hanoi government merged Ho Chi Minh city and Gia Định National School for decorative Arts and the Saigon College of Fine Arts into Ho Chi Minh City Fine Arts College, and established Ho Chi Minh City branch of The Vietnam Association of Fine Arts.

=== Period of Renewal from 1985 ===
Artists benefited from greater freedom of expression after the launch of the Đổi Mới campaign. The economic reforms allowed artists a greater outlet for creative expressions.

However, Nguyen Quan who was elected into the executive committee of Vietnam Association of Fine Arts and holding position as the chief editor of the association's Magazine Mỹ Thuật (Fine Arts) was removed from his position after organizing a workshop with 30 artist in Đại Lải, North of Hanoi in 1986. The workshop was not acceptable by authority for "the retreat not only promoted individual expression and art for art's sake, it also went against what the state had instituted over the past three decades in that it allowed for artists to explore their individuality rather than represent that collective sentiments of their community."

== Contemporary art ==
Nowadays, besides working with traditional material like oil, acrylic, lacquer on wood, the younger generation of Vietnamese artists have become very active in involving different forms of arts, such as installation, performance and video art with many of them attaining international recognition for their artworks and exhibitions worldwide. For example, Nhà Sàn Collective (formerly Nhà Sàn Studio), established in 1998, was the first artist-led, non-profit initiative to be run in Vietnam. Nhà Sàn studio nurtured the first generation of Vietnamese avant-garde artists emergent in the early 1990s.

RMIT University Vietnam art collection is one of the most prestigious collections of contemporary Vietnamese art in the world. This collection is not only historically important, but one that will continue to grow the understanding of Vietnamese culture for generations to come. The Vietnamese artists in the collection range from established and mid-career artists, whose works feature in significant exhibitions and notable private collections and public institutions worldwide, to young emerging artists who continue to tackle issues with fresh and new interpretations. RMIT University is at the forefront of creative education and this collection allows both students and the wider community to experience the artistic expression of an important generation of contemporary Vietnamese artists. The art collection is managed by the RMIT Library Vietnam.

== Architecture ==
It is believed that in prehistoric times, Vietnamese people lived in stilt-houses, as depicted on the bronze Dong Son drums. Similar kinds of houses can still be found in Vietnam today.

When Chinese influence permeated Vietnam, Chinese architecture had a large influence on the basic structure of many types of Vietnamese buildings, mostly pagodas and temples, communal houses, houses of scholar-bureaucrats, aristocracy, and imperial palaces and quarters. Nevertheless, these structures combined both Chinese influences and native style. With French colonization of Vietnam in the 19th century, many French-styled buildings were constructed, including villas, government buildings, opera houses, etc. Many of these buildings still stand in Vietnam and are one of the clearest remnants of the French colonial legacy.

Some of Vietnam's most notable architectural structures include:

- Temple of Literature or (Văn Miếu): Located in Hanoi, North Vietnam. It was constructed during the Lý dynasty and dedicated to Confucius and his disciples. It is a fine example of the elegance of Lý dynasty architecture, although much of it is in need of repair. The Temple of Literature is a series of courtyards, buildings and pavilions, the center of which houses the famed stone steles. These steles are placed on top of stone turtles, and are inscribed with the names of doctorate candidates successful at the Imperial examination. Also within the temple lies the "Quốc Tử Giám" or National University, which functioned for approximately 700 years, from 1076 to 1779.
- Imperial City, Huế: During the reign of the Nguyễn dynasty, a new imperial citadel in Huế was built, largely based on the Chinese Forbidden City in Beijing, and also called the Purple Forbidden City. However, it still employed many obvious Vietnamese characteristics in its design. Other imperial structures were built later, such as the outlying tomb of Khải Định, which used French architectural elements as well. The tomb of Minh Mạng is often considered as one of the most beautiful structures in Huế, situated near a vast lotus pond. Its construction was not completed until after Minh Mạng's death. The citadel formerly sprawled a vast estate, but during subsequent wars and conflicts, much of it had been destroyed and later turned into rice paddies. The remaining areas are currently being restored by UNESCO.
- One Pillar Pagoda: The one pillar pagoda is one of the most ancient structures of Hanoi, its design credited to Emperor Lý Thái Tổ The story goes that the emperor had longed for a son, and one day dreamed that the Goddess of Mercy was sitting on a lotus flower offering him a son. In gratitude and reverence of his dream he ordered the construction of a small pagoda in the form of a lotus, overlooking a pond. The pagoda has been rebuilt countlessly due to it being destroyed and burnt in wars by opponents.
- Hương Temple: The Hương Temple is an ancient structure in Hà Tây province, located in the Hương Mountain, and is the site for a yearly festival attended by hundreds of thousands of Vietnamese people. Most people reach the pagoda by taking an hour boat ride across the scenic river (passing the countryside scattered with smaller temples) before reaching the Hương Temple itself. Inside are a series of temples and structures, and a grotto with stairs leading to two paths: "Heaven's gate" and "Hell's gate". Descending deep into the grotto one finds the Trong Temple. The beauty of the Hương Temple and surrounding areas have served as the subject in many Vietnamese poems.

== Calligraphy ==
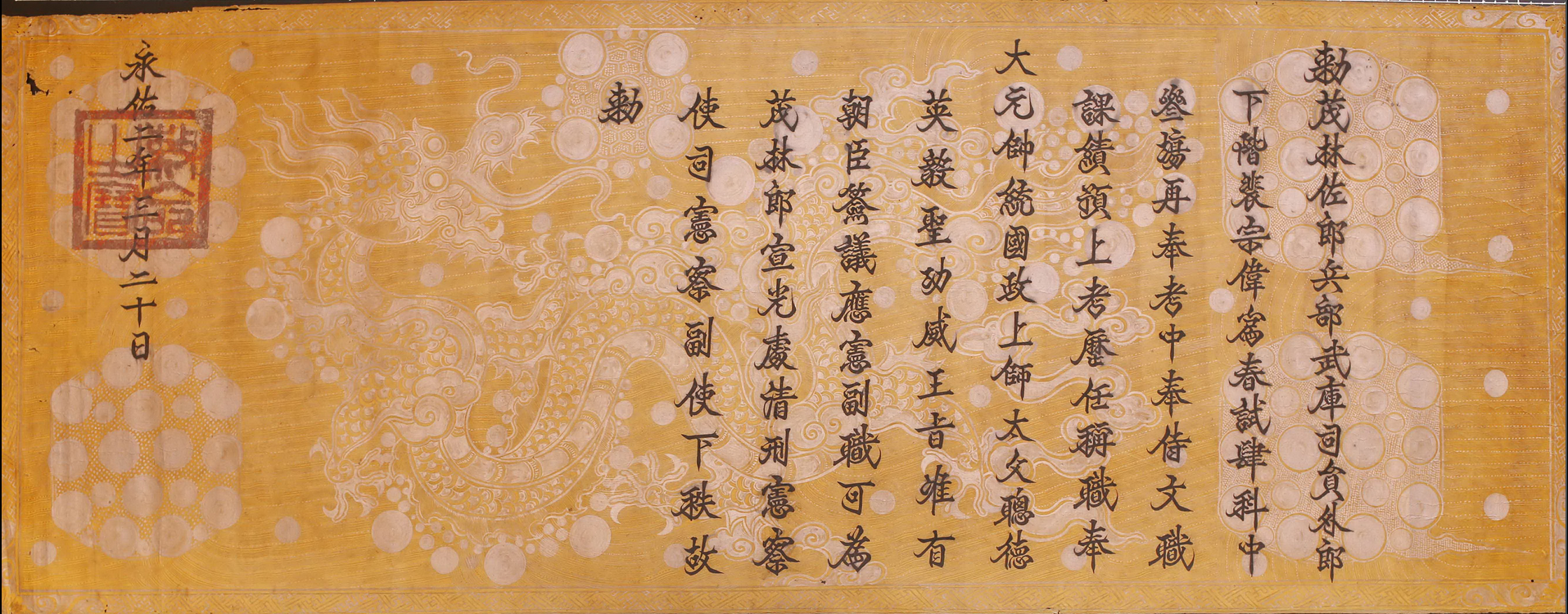
A Vietnamese royal edict dating from 1736 written in calligraphic Lệnh thư style.

Calligraphy has had a long history in Vietnam, previously using Chữ Hán along with Chữ Nôm. However, most modern Vietnamese calligraphy instead uses the Latin alphabet-based Vietnamese alphabet, which has proven to be very popular.

In the past, with literacy in the old character-based writing systems of Vietnam being restricted to scholars and elites, calligraphy nevertheless still played an important part in Vietnamese life. On special occasions such as the Tết Nguyên Đán, people would go to the village teacher or scholar to make them a calligraphy hanging (often poetry, folk sayings or even single words). People who could not read or write also often commissioned scholars to write prayers which they would burn at temple shrines.

== Visual arts ==
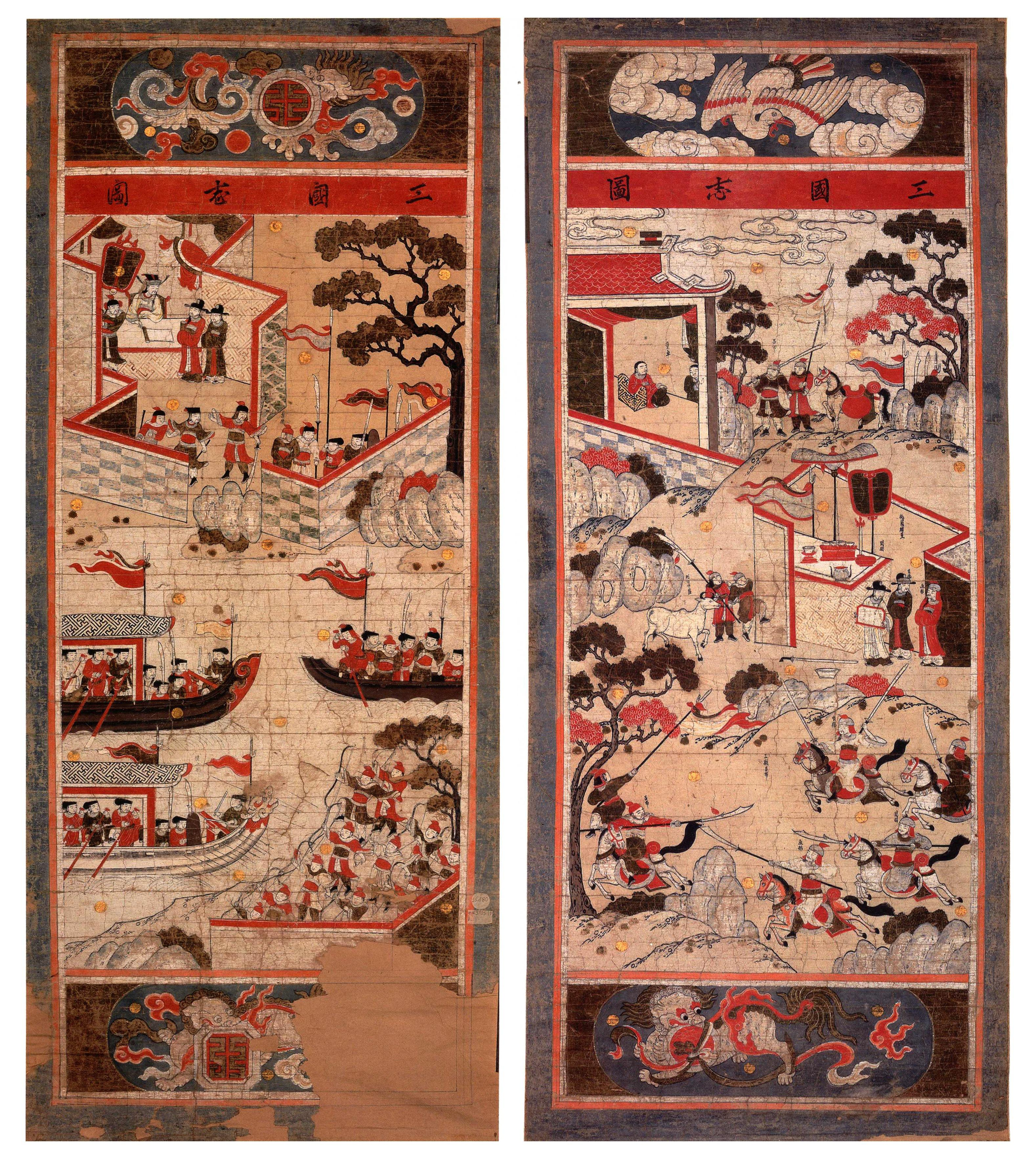
Two paintings named Tam quốc chí đồ (三國志圖) at Độc Lôi Temple, Nghệ An, Revival Lê dynasty

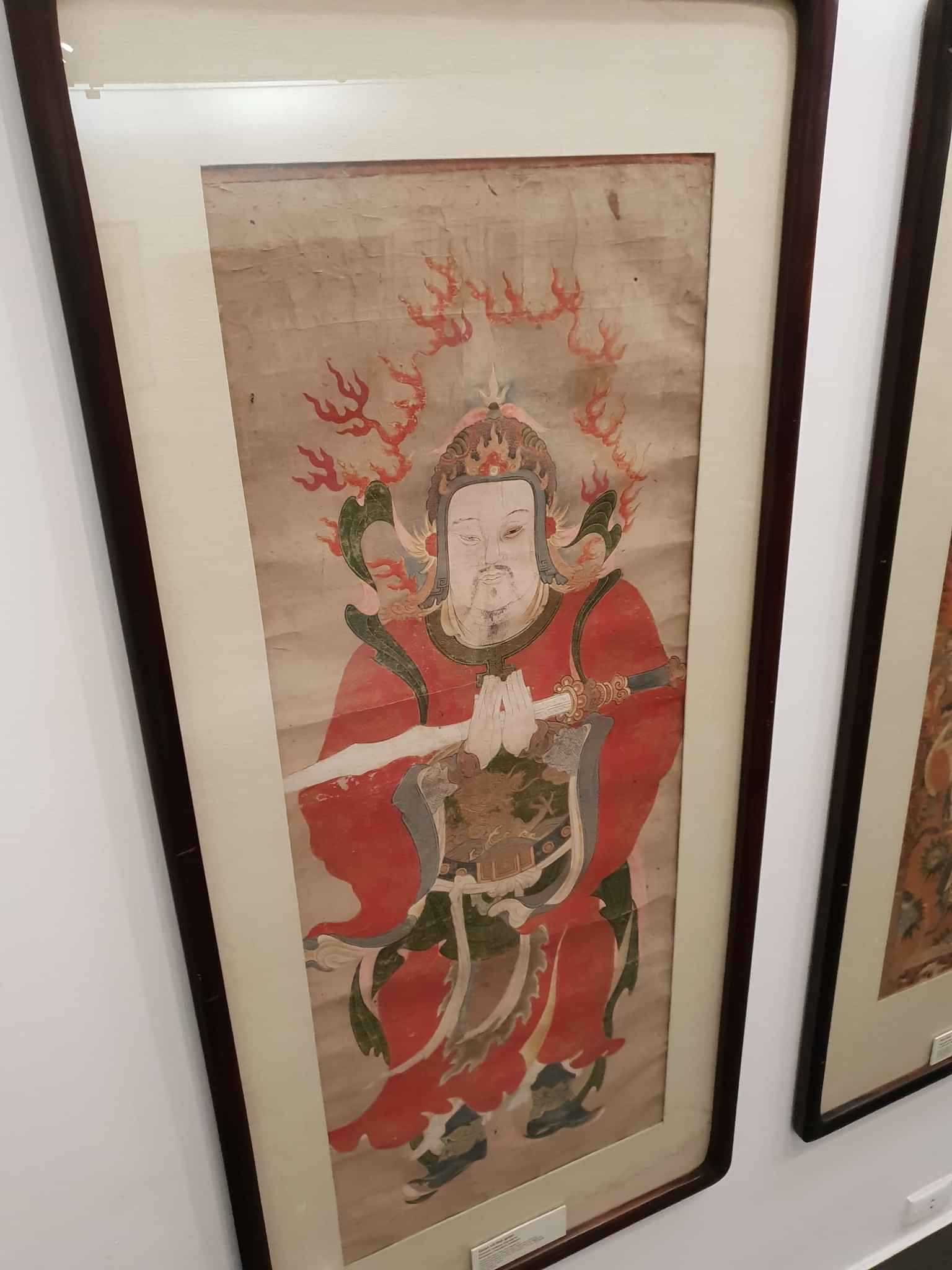
Painting of Imperial guard of the Lê dynasty

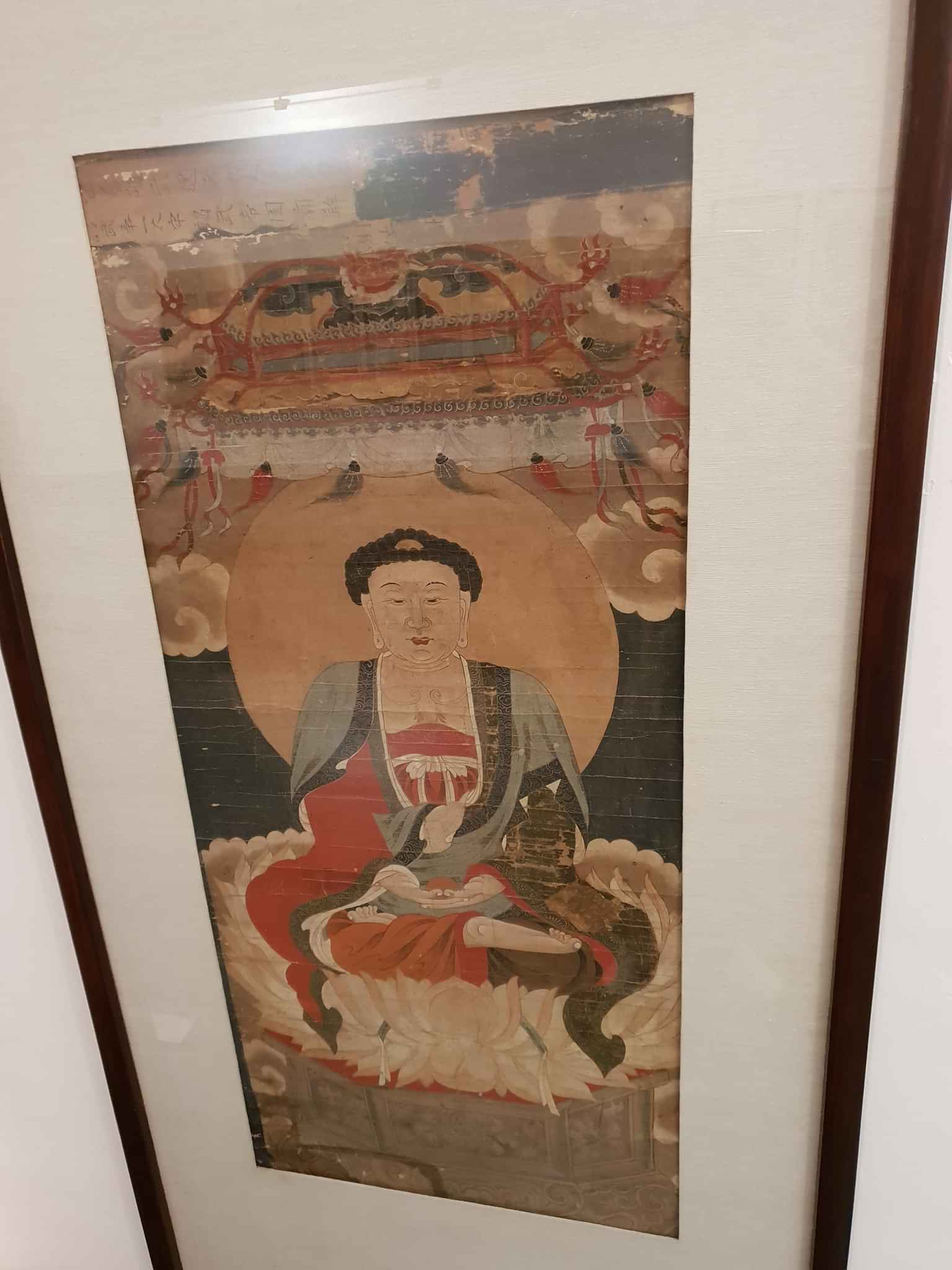
Painting of Buddha of the Lê dynasty

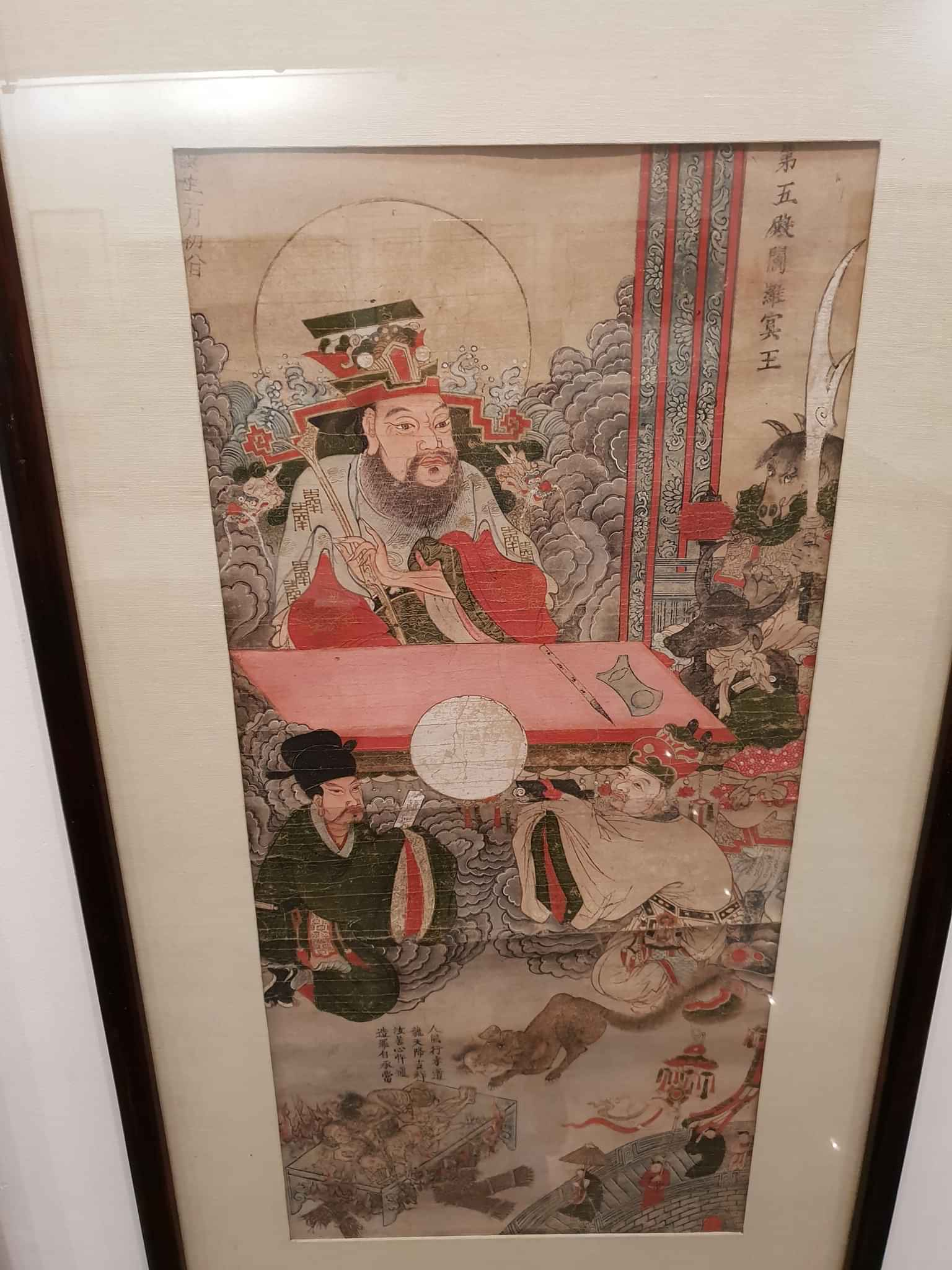
Painting of a Diêm Vương (Yama) and a scene of the Underworld, Lê dynasty

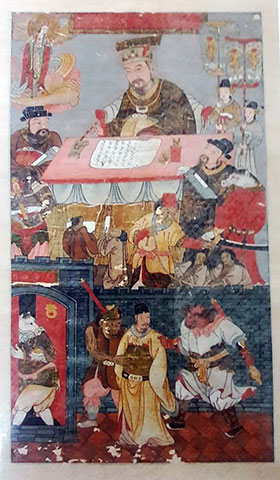
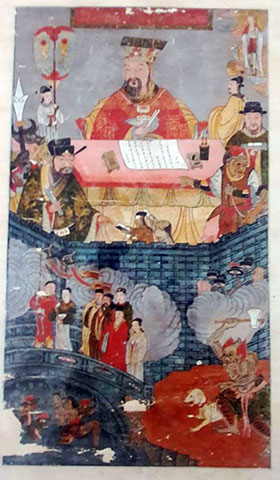
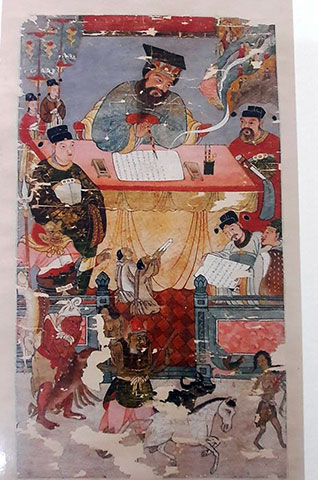
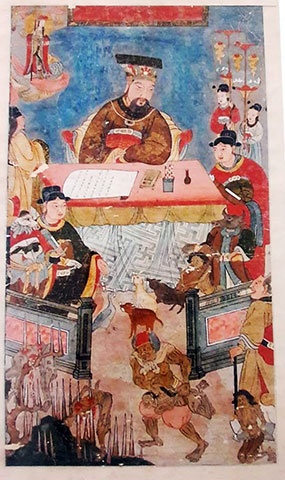
Four paintings depicting four Diêm Vương (out of ten Diêm Vương) of the Nguyễn dynasty

=== Silk painting ===
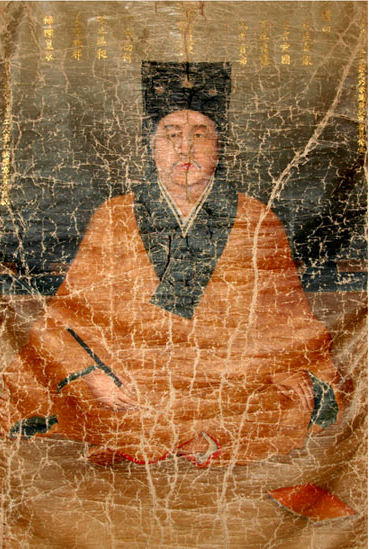
Portrait of Nguyễn Quán Nho, the chancellor of the Revival Lê dynasty from 1702 to 1707

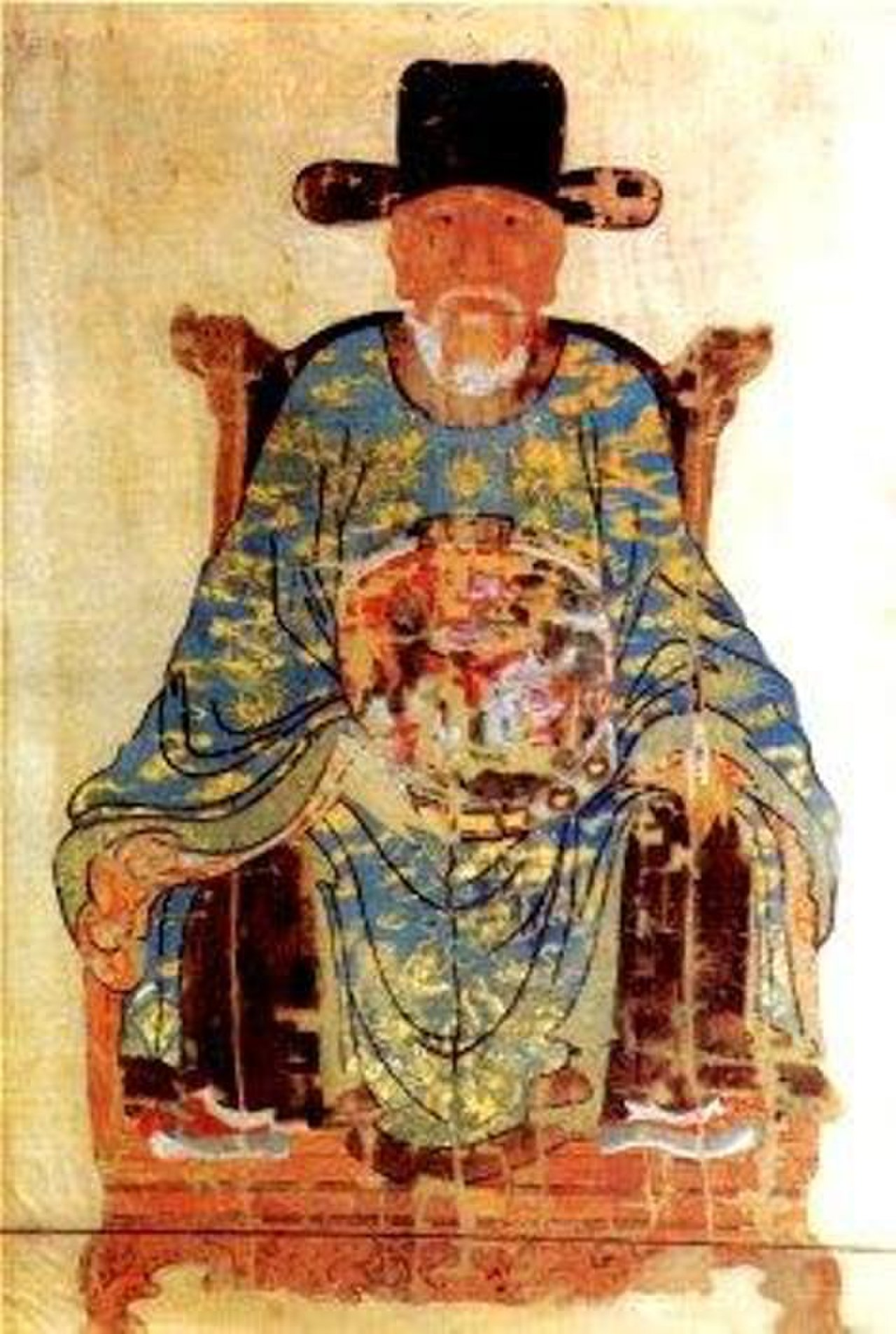
Silk painting portrait of Nguyễn Trãi (15th century)

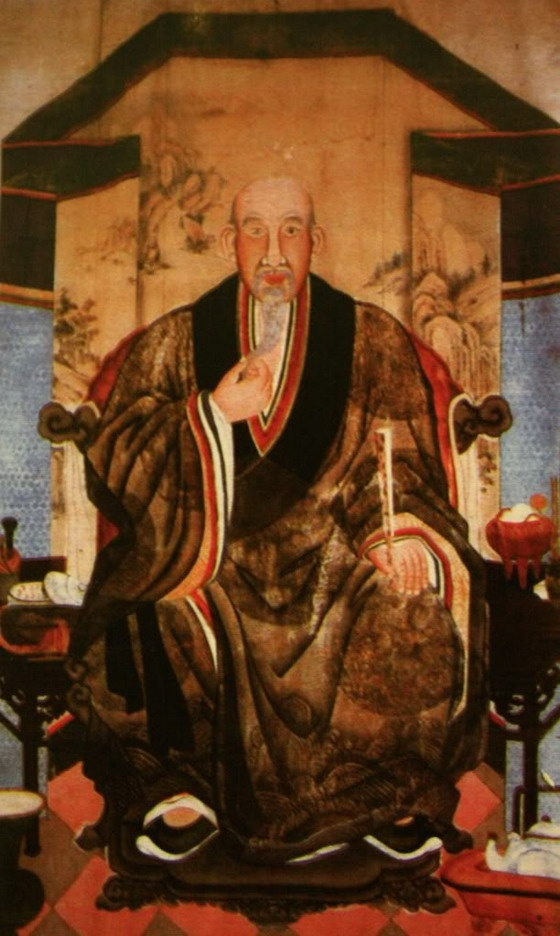
Portrait of Trịnh Đình Kiên, 18th century, Revival Lê dynasty

Vietnamese silk painting is one of the most popular forms of art in Vietnam, favored for the mystical atmosphere that can be achieved with the medium. During the 19th and 20th centuries, French influence was absorbed into Vietnamese art and the liberal and modern use of color especially began to differentiate Vietnamese silk paintings from their Chinese, Japanese, and Korean counterparts. Vietnamese silk paintings typically showcase the countryside, landscapes, pagodas, historical events or scenes of daily life.

=== Lacquer painting ===
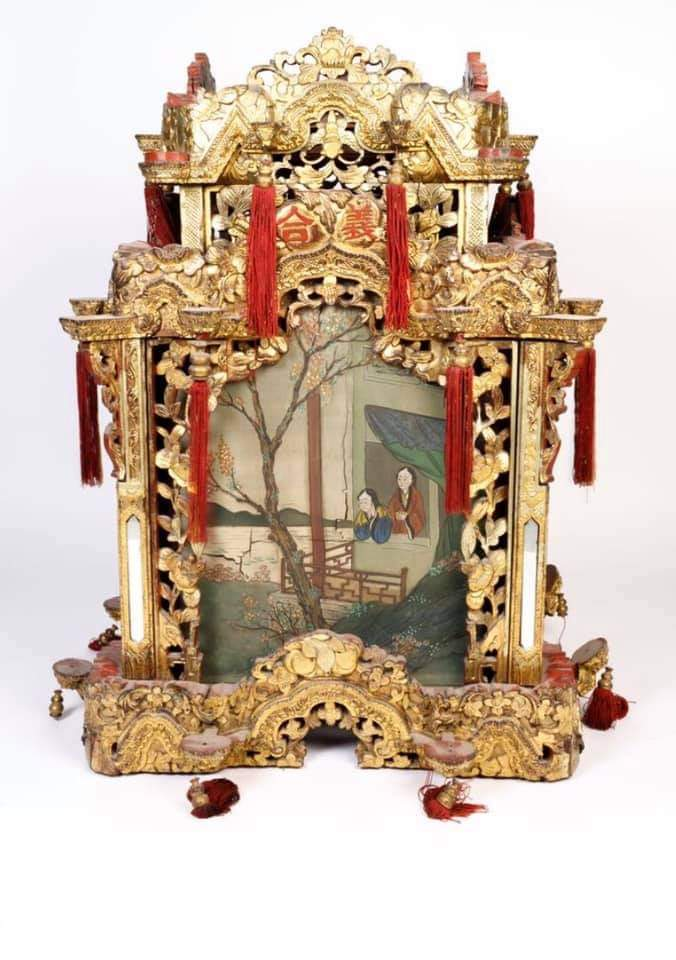
Lacquered painting on wood depicting 2 girls looking at the scenery in the shape of an altar, Revival Lê dynasty period.

=== Woodblock prints ===
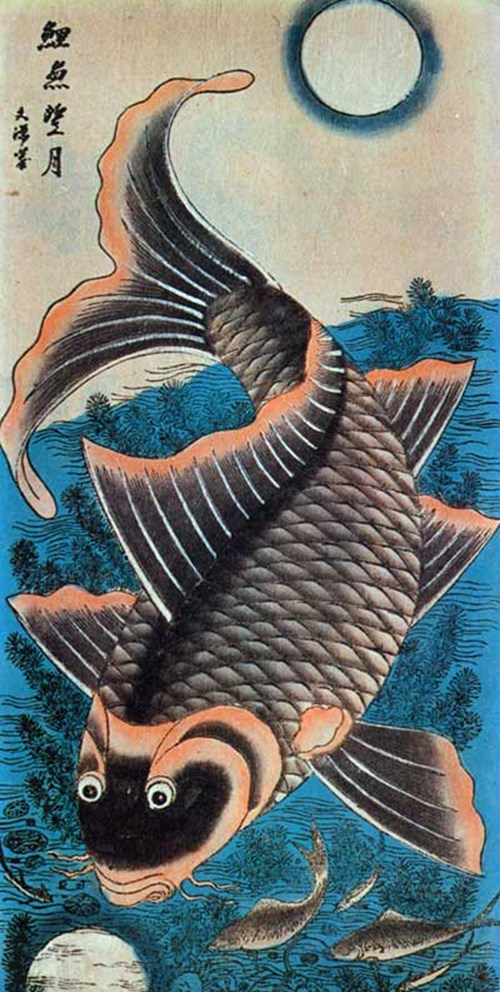
A Đông Hồ folk woodblock painting depicting a carp.

A folk art with a long history in Vietnam, Vietnamese woodblock prints have reached a level of popularity outside of Vietnam. Organic materials are used to make the paint, which is used on wood and pressed on paper. The process is repeated with different colors.

=== Photography ===
Photographic technology was introduced to Vietnam in the mid 19th century by French and Chinese commercial photographers. Since its introduction a diverse range of photography practices have emerged such as fine art photography, documentary photography, and landscape photography. The development of such practices have been accelerated following Đổi Mới, that has resulted in a diversification of funding for artists and increased international exposure.

=== Sculpture ===
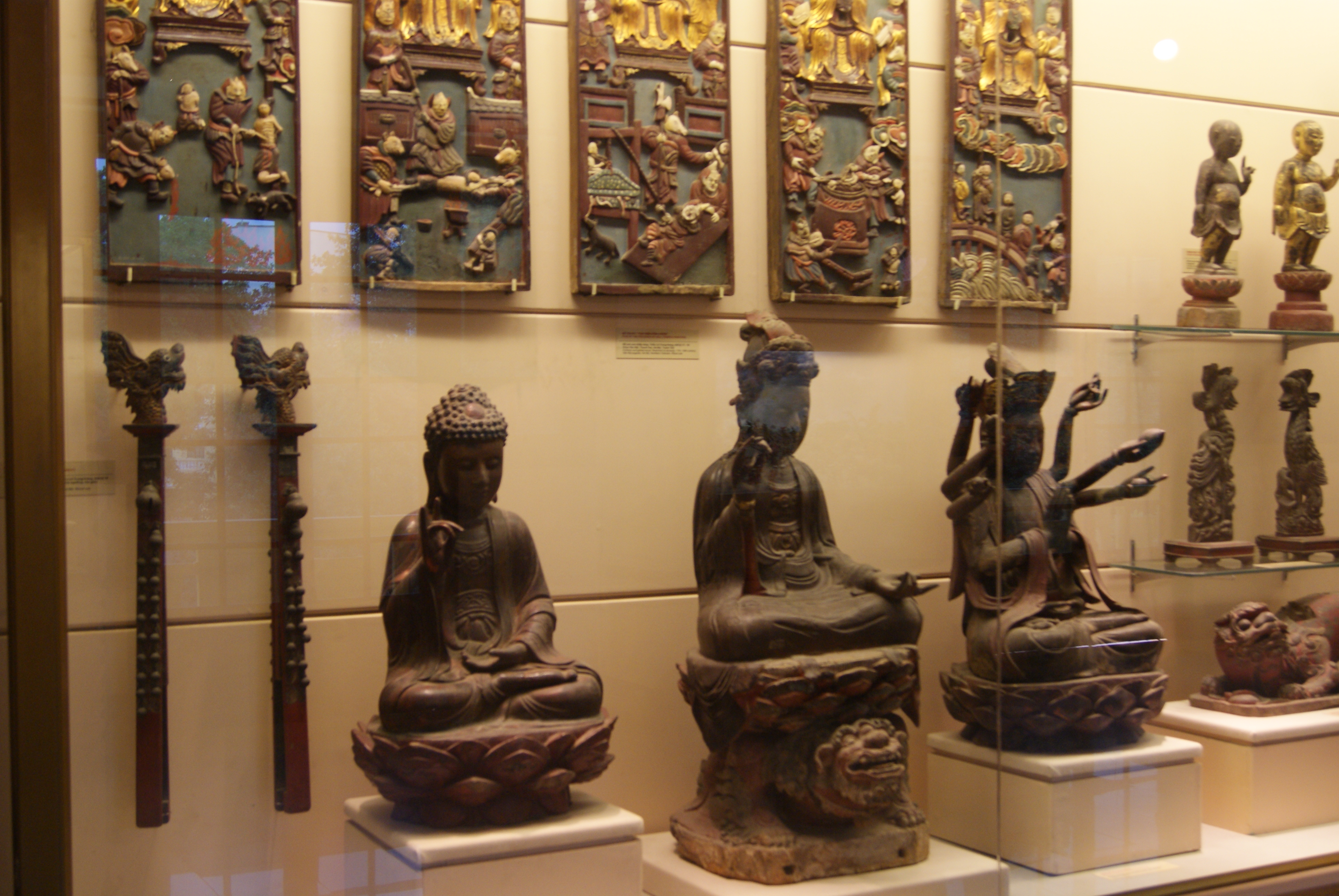
Wooden sculptures and reliefs from the 17th and 18th century

== Performing arts ==
=== Traditional music ===
Traditional Vietnamese music is extremely diverse, consisting of many different styles varying from region to region. Some of the most widely known genres include:

- Quan họ: A type of improvisational music, it is sung a cappella and has a longstanding tradition in Vietnam, used in courtship rituals.
- Imperial Court music: Music performed in the Vietnamese court during feudalistic times. When referring specifically to the "Nhã nhạc" form it includes court music from the Trần dynasty on to the Nguyễn dynasty. It features an array of instruments, featuring musicians and dancers adorned in elaborate garb.
- Ca trù: An ancient form of chamber music which originated in the imperial court. It gradually came to be associated with a geisha-type of entertainment where talented female musicians entertained rich and powerful men, often scholars and bureaucrats who most enjoyed the genre. It was condemned in the 20th century by the government, being tied falsely with prostitution, but recently it has seen a revival as appreciation for its cultural significance has grown. Vietnam has completed documents to have Ca trù recognized by UNESCO as a potential Intangible Cultural Heritage.

=== Traditional theatre ===
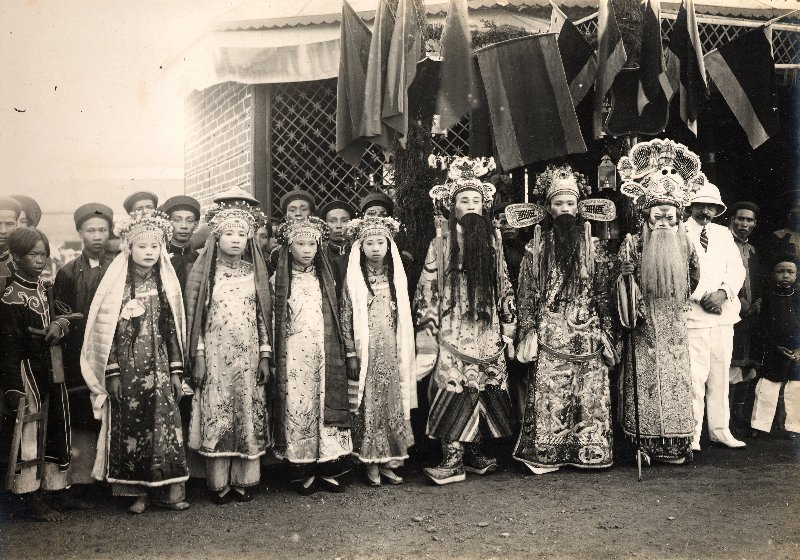
Tuồng theatre actors

Genres include:

- Cải lương: A kind of modern folk opera originating in South Vietnam, which utilizes extensive vibrato techniques. It remains very popular in modern Vietnam when compared to other folk styles.
- Chèo: The most mainstream of theatre/music forms in the past, enjoyed widely by the public rather than the more obscure Ca trù which was favored more by scholars and elites.
- Tuồng (also known as Hát bội): A theatre form strongly influenced by Chinese opera, it transitioned from being entertainment for the royal court to travelling troupes who performed for commoners and peasants, featuring many well-known stock characters.

=== Traditional dance ===
Vietnam has 54 different ethnics, each with their own traditional dance. Among the ethnic Vietnamese majority, there are several traditional dances performed widely at festivals and other special occasions, such as the lion dance.

In the imperial court, there also developed throughout the centuries a series of complex court dances which require great skill. Some of the more widely known are the imperial lantern dance, fan dance, and platter dance, among others.

=== Water puppetry ===
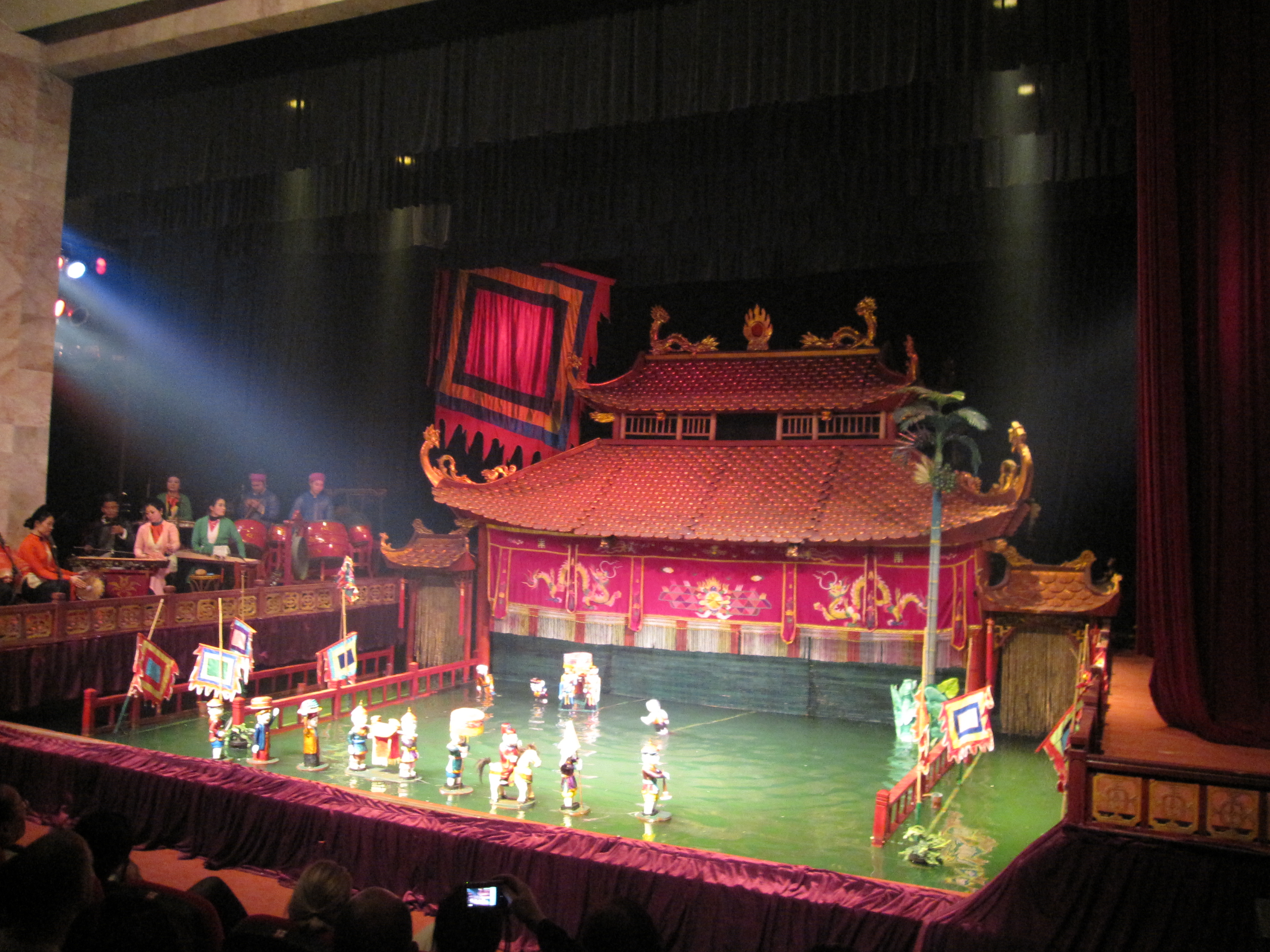
Water puppetry theatre in Hanoi

Water puppetry is a distinct Vietnamese art which had its origins in the 12th century. In water puppetry, a split-bamboo screen obscures puppets which stand in water and are manipulated using long poles hidden beneath the water. Epic storylines are played out with many different characters, often depicting traditional scenes of Vietnamese life. Despite nearly dying out in the 20th century, it has been saved by efforts of preservation and is now largely seen by tourists to Vietnam.

== Language arts ==
=== Literature ===
Vietnamese literature, both oral and written, was created largely by Vietnamese-speaking people, although Francophone Vietnamese and English-speaking Vietnamese authors in Australia and the United States are considered by many critics as part of the national tradition. For much of its history, Vietnam was dominated by China and, as a result, much of the written work during this period was in Chữ Hán. Chữ Nôm, created around the 10th century, allowed writers to compose in Vietnamese using modified Chinese characters. Although regarded as inferior to Chinese, it gradually grew in prestige. It flourished in the 18th century when many notable Vietnamese writers and poets composed their works in chữ nôm and it briefly became the official written script. While the Vietnamese alphabet was created in the 17th century, it did not become popular outside of missionary groups until the early 20th century, when the French colonial administration mandated its use in French Indochina. By the mid-20th century, virtually all Vietnamese works of literature were composed in the Vietnamese alphabet.

Some defining works of literature include The Tale of Kieu by Nguyễn Du, and Lục Vân Tiên by Nguyễn Đình Chiểu.

=== Poetry ===
Poet Hồ Xuân Hương (born during the end of the 18th century) composed much of her poetry in Chữ Nôm, and most of it has been translated into the Vietnamese alphabet for modern Vietnamese. Her poetry continues to be widely popular. Other poets such as the famous Mandarin official Dương Khuê had some of his poetry adapted into songs that are still famous today, such as the ca trù-genre song "Hồng hồng, tuyết tuyết".

Many Vietnamese poems, along with folk "literature" in general, tends to be much more of an oral tradition – as literacy (as it is defined today) in the past was restricted mostly to scholars and the elite.

== See also ==
- Censorship in Vietnam
- Culture of Vietnam
- History of Vietnam
- Ho Chi Minh City Museum of Fine Arts
- List of Vietnamese artists
- Vietnamese studies
