= Trần Quang Trân =

Vietnamese painter and lacquer artist

Trần Quang Trân, also Tran Quang Tran, (1900–1969) was a lacquer artist and a Vietnamese painter.

He is one of the first students (third promotion 1932) who graduated from the Indochina College of Fine Arts, now Vietnam University of Fine Arts. He is thus one of the founders of Vietnamese artistic tradition.

== Biography ==
Tran Quang Tran has been credited as one of the first artist to be interested in lacquer painting and one of the most innovative, under the influence of the professor and painter Joseph Inguimberty. Despite this, he left only a modest quantity of artworks which are nowadays extremely rare. Most of them are oil paintings, watercolors, wash drawings and charcoal drawings. None of the lacquer paintings that made him quite well known at the time still exist nowadays. His well-known painting, "The sparkling water pond", was without any doubt the first lacquer painting ever done in Indochina. This painting is said to have inspired the master of Vietnamese lacquer Nguyễn Gia Trí. It belonged to the collection of the Indochina College of Fine Arts. It was probably destroyed or stolen during the beginning of the Indochina war.

Born in Hanoi region, Tran Quang Tran began to study trading and work for an oil company in Haiphong as well as a lamp factory in Dap Cau. It is only at the beginning of 1927 until 1932 that he studied at the Fine Arts Academy. He stood out thanks to his refined works and drawings realised under the direction of artist Dinh Van Thanh.

As an artist, Tran Quang Tran is credited with the invention of the technique consisting in the addition of gold powder between lacquer layers. This technique allows light and shadow effects and it is later widely used by renowned Vietnamese artists such as Pham Hau (Phạm Hầu), Trần Văn Cẩn, Nguyễn Khang and Nguyễn Gia Trí. It is possible that Tran Quang Tran visited Japan around 1930 in order to improve his technique.

Once he graduated from Indochina College of Fine Arts in 1932, he opened his painting workshop at 87 Charron street in Hanoi. Throughout the 1930s, he painted lacquer panels and boxes and many portraits of famous Vietnamese figures.

Tran Quang Tran has chosen to change his artist's name and his signature during the mid-1930, and he has signed as Ngym or Nghi Am since.

His work affections desert street scenes, temples, old buildings or lakes in order to produce an impression of tranquility. He mixes oriental and western traditions in a unique blend.

During the early 1940s, he started a painting teaching career in the private schools of Thang Long, Gia Long and from 1949 in the Vietnam University of Fine Arts. Living on the Northern Vietnamese side during the war, he worked from 1958 to 1962 for Vietnam Film Studio (an animation studio) and delivered many conferences in a Vietnamese film school.

He continued to paint until the ultimate years of his life. He died in 1969.
