= Georges Barrière =

French painter (1881–1944)

Georges Barrière (28 March 1881 in Chablis – 1944 in Đồ Sơn) was a French painter. He went to Paris at the age of 19 to follow the courses of Léon Bonnat and Jules Adler at the Beaux-Arts in Paris. His paintings were shown at the Salon d'Automne in 1903, at the Société des Artistes Indépendants in 1906, and the Salon des Artistes Français in 1909.

During World War I he made many sketches of the trench life of the French soldiers, with titles such as "Sous les Marmites au poste de secours de la cote 204."

After the war his paintings were shown at the Société nationale des Beaux-Arts.

The last ten years of his life were spent in Indochina. In 1934 at the age of 52 he won the Prix de l'Indochine with a portrait of his friend the Swiss sculptor August Heng (1891-1968), but his bursary completed thereafter did not return home to France.

However he did not show much interest in local art techniques, and modern Vietnamese art historians have critically compared his Frenchman-abroad approach with painters such as Joseph Inguimberty who took on Vietnamese techniques. (Note: "Nguyen Quang Phong describes Joseph Inguimberty as being "just like a Vietnamese painter who understands and loves his homeland. Compared to him," Nguyen Quang Phong continues, "Georges Barriere was only a 'French colonialist,' painting indigenous landscapes and men with the eyes of a person motivated by curiosity and losing all objective realities which should have captivated the attention of any classical painter."25 To give so much credit to these French artists for their contributions to Vietnamese painting thus jars with current Western scholars' perceptions of Vietnam's response to colonial education.") Art historian Nguyễn Quang Phòng in particular (1996) classes Barrière as representative of the second generation of French teachers he considers lacked the talent and even moral character of the first generation. Though other more recent Vietnamese writers have been more appreciative of Barrière. He died at the coastal resort of Đồ Sơn near Haiphong.
