= Little Sister Thuy =

1943 painting by Trần Văn Cẩn

- Em Thúy (Vietnamese)
- Artist: Trần Văn Cẩn
- Year: 1943
- Medium: Oil
- Dimensions: 60 cm × 45 cm (24 in × 18 in)
- Location: Vietnam National Museum of Fine Arts

Little Sister Thuy (Em Thúy), often referred as Little Thuy, is an oil painting created by painter Trần Văn Cẩn (Tran Van Can) in 1943. Depicting the artist's 8-year-old niece, the painting is considered one of Tran Van Can's finest works as well as one of the typical portraits of 20th-century Vietnam. The painting has been recognized as a 'National Treasure' by the Socialist Republic of Vietnam's Prime Minister Nguyễn Tấn Dũng in 2013.

== Description ==
Little Sister Thuy is a frontal portrait of an 8-year-old girl in white clothes sitting on a rattan chair, slightly leaning, with her hands closed. Her position suggests that she is a little shy. She has short hair, bright eyes and an innocent face. The girl in the painting is Nguyen Minh Thuy, born in 1935, and she is Trần Văn Cẩn's niece.

On July 9, 2024, Madame Minh Thuy died at her residence in Thanh Xuan district, Hanoi, at the age of 89.

== History ==
Tran Van Can is one of the leading representatives of Vietnamese painting in the early 20th century. He graduated as valedictorian from École des Beaux Arts de l’Indochine in 1937. In World War II, he often lived with a relative's family on Hang Cot street, Hanoi. Minh Thuy is his favorite niece in his family, so he painted his niece a portrait in 1943, with a simple title, Little Sister Thuy (Em Thúy), when Minh Thuy was 8 years old.

When the French Army returned to occupy Hanoi during the First Indochina War, Thuy's family evacuated without taking the painting. By the time they returned, the painting had been stolen. The family then bought the painting from an art dealer who had found Little Sister Thuy in a barber's house. Finally, Little Sister Thuy was given by Tran Van Can to the Vietnam National Museum of Fine Arts. In addition to the portrait of the 8-year-old Minh Thuy, Tran Van Can also had another painting of Thuy when she was 24 years old.

After more than 60 years, the painting began to fall into degradation. In 2003, Little Sister Thuy was proposed to be in restoration and preservation abroad; however, the Ministry of Culture, Sports and Tourism of Vietnam did not approve this proposition. A year later, the Australian painting conservator Caroline Fry took responsibility for the restoration of Little Sister Thuy at the Vietnam National Museum of Fine Arts. According to her assessment, after the restoration, the painting can maintain good condition for about 20 years. The painting was officially handed over to the Vietnam National Museum of Fine Arts on 28 June 2004.

== Reviews ==
Little Sister Thuy is considered one of the most successful portrait paintings of 20th century Vietnamese art. According to art critic Thái Bá Vân, Little Sister Thuy reflects the inner world of Tran Van Can in the 1940s when the artist witnessed the Westernization's process in Vietnam. The painting depicts the youthful girl's face.

Inspired by Little Sister Thuy, a British man, Paul Zetter, composed the song Little Thuy's Minuet (Khúc minuet dành cho Em Thúy).

== See also ==
- Trần Văn Cẩn
- Thái Bá Vân
- École des Beaux Arts de l’Indochine

== Bibliography ==
- Thái, Bá Vân (1998). Tiếp xúc với nghệ thuật. Hà Nội: Viện Mỹ thuật.
- Taylor, Nora Annesley (2009). Painters in Hanoi. University of Hawaii Press. doi:10.1515/9780824845100-012. ISBN 9780824845100.
