= Nguyễn Phan Chánh =

Vietamese painter

- Nguyễn Phan Chánh
- Born: July 21, 1892; Ha Tinh
- Died: November 22, 1984 (aged 92); Ha Noi
- Education: École Supérieure des Beaux Arts de l’Indochine
- Known for: Silk painting
- Awards: Labor Order; Order of Independence; Ho Chi Minh Prize

Nguyen Phan Chanh (July 21, 1892 - November 22, 1984) was born in a rural Vietnamese village, in Ha Tinh (now Nghe Tinh) province. His early education was in Chinese (as was common in pre-colonial times), and he studied Chinese calligraphy so as to pass the qualifying exams for the title of Mandarin. However, the exams were abolished before he was old enough to sit them. With his first ambition thwarted, it was decided that he should continue studying painting at the l'Ecole des Beaux-arts d'Indochine [the Indochinese College of Fine Arts] in Hanoi.

The pamphlets describing the goals for l'Ecole des Beaux-arts d'Indochine used the phrase “to transform the indigenous craftsmen into professional artists” which reflects the colonial mind-set of civilizing and educating "the natives". However, despite these rather condescending aims, Victor Tardieu, and his co-founder, Nam Son Nguyen Van Tho, and their colleague Joseph Imguimberty, in addition to introducing observation-based drawing classes, composition and oil painting, did not simply impose European art techniques, theories and media, they also included the study of oriental media such as woodblock printing, silk and lacquer painting in the curriculum, which demonstrates their interest in and openness to local culture and traditions. It seems that despite the inevitable resentment of colonialism at that time, the individual people involved in establishing l'Ecole des Beaux-arts d'Indochine had a genuine interest in, and recognition of, the potential of Vietnamese art (especially painting), and a rapport with the students that helped to build an artistic community.

Chanh was one of the early entrants to the newly opened French-established l'Ecole des Beaux-arts d'Indochine in 1925, 33 years of age, older than many of his classmates, and from a different and more rural geographical region. According to Boi Tran Huynh "Chanh was considered a rather awkward student, who insisted on maintaining tradition" and it has been suggested that his peers and French tutors considered his focus on representing village life rather unsophisticated and old-fashioned. Whilst Chanh had struggled with oil painting, he "established himself as a master" at silk painting.

Painting on silk is considered to be a traditionally Chinese art form, although Chanh argued it "expressed the national (Vietnamese) character to the highest degree" and goes on to talk about the enthusiastic reception given to his and other artists in their exhibition in Hanoi, 1954-1955, where opinion stated that the paintings were "neither Chinese, Japanese or French." (i.e. that they were distinctively Vietnamese). The emphasis given to silk painting being an art form which effectively expresses Vietnam"s national identity reflects the political context of the times, and the directives from Truong Chinh (Marxism and Vietnamese Culture) and Ho Chi Minh, that art should follow the socialist agenda and be a form of propaganda, glorifying the peasants and soldiers of Vietnam.

Chanh participated in both National resistance wars, was a keen patriot, and in the post-colonial era (after 1945) was praised for the fact that his artwork that illustrated Vietnamese village life and history in modest and simple terms, often interpreted as a continuation of native "folk" art tradition, which in the newly established republic represented his resilience against foreign domination.

Chanh was influenced by the rapidly changing politics and external influences (particularly in education) in Vietnam during his lifetime, most notably Chinese and French. His work has been described as unique, elegant and poignant, and is internationally recognized.

International exhibitions of Chanh's silk paintings include Paris 1931, Italy in 1934, America in 1937, Japan in 1940, then in Czechoslovakia, Hungary and Romania in 1982, and Poland and the former Soviet Union in 1983.

In 2013, at Christie's Hong Kong, Chanh's La Marchand de Riz [The Rice Seller], initially valued at just 50 pounds sterling ($75) sold for HK$3.03 million ($390,000) setting a record for a work by a Vietnamese artist. When the British seller of the 1932 work took it to Christie's in London, it was mistakenly identified as a Chinese work because the artist signed his name in Chinese characters. After it was forwarded to specialists in Asia, they recognized the painting by the artist"s signature in romanized characters on the back of the canvas and valued it at between HK$800,000 and HK$1 million.

May 26, painting La Marchande de Oc [The Snail Seller - Nguoi ban oc] by Chanh, was sold for US$600,000 (HKD4.66 million). And May 27, 2018, another painting was sold at over US$853,000 (HKD6.7 million) at an auction by Christie's Hong Kong, the painting depicts a girl feeding her bird, Enfant à l'oiseau [Child with Bird - Em be ben chu chim] ink and colour powder on silk.

The auction with name "20th Century & Contemporary Art" on 29 May 2019, painting Le Jeu des Cases Gagnantes [Playing 'Go'-Choi co]was sold for US$440,000 (HKD3.458 million) by Christie's Hong Kong.

== Works ==
A few of his works are in the Vietnam National Museum of Fine Arts, Hanoi, but most are in private galleries and collections.

Typical paintings include:

- French: Carré mandarin, lit. 'Mandarin square' - Vietnamese: Quảng trường Mandarin
- French: La fille lave les légumes, lit. 'The girl washing vegetables' - Vietnamese: Co gai rua rau
- French: Lune, lit. 'Moon' - Vietnamese: Mặt trăng
- Tien Dung va Chu Dong Tu
- French: Bonheur, lit. 'Happiness' Vietnamese: Hanh phuc
