= Nguyễn Khang =

Nguyễn Khang may refer to:

- Nguyễn Khang (painter) (1912–1989), Vietnamese painter
- Nguyễn Khang (politician) (1919–1976), organizer of the communists in Hanoi following the Japanese surrender in 1945
- Nguyễn Khang, alternative name of Trần Thiêm Bình (d.1406), a pretender to the Vietnamese throne during the Hồ dynasty
