= Mai Thứ =

Vietnamese painter from Haiphong

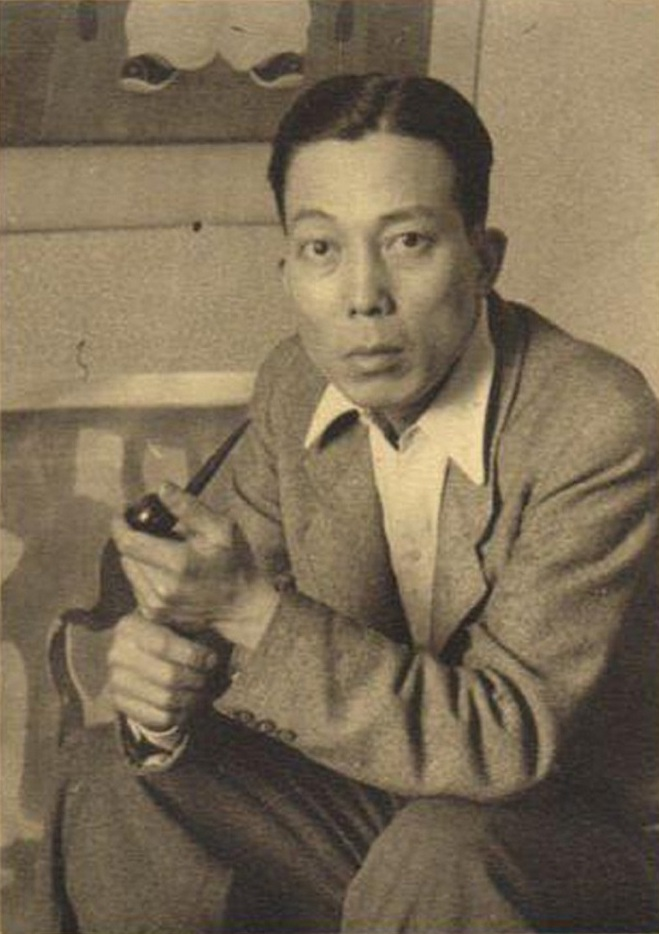
Mai Trung Thứ

Mai Trung Thứ (An Dương, 1906-Hải Phòng, 10 October 1980), or Mai Thứ, was a Vietnamese painter. He was one of the graduates of the 1st (1925–1930) entering class of the École des Beaux-Arts de l'Indochine in Hanoi. He lived and worked mostly in France. His main subjects were women, children and daily life, incorporating some traditional Vietnamese conceptions about fine arts and folk arts. All his work, apart from a few oil paintings, is silk painting with gouache, by rubbing and colours applied as solids.

== Biography ==
Mai Trung Thu (Mai Thu) was born in 1906 in Ro Nha, Kien An, Haiphong city (today: xã Tân Tiến, huyện An Dương, Hải Phòng). He was a member of the first class of the École des Beaux-Arts de l'Indochine in Hanoi along with Le Pho. During his education he developed a painting style in which he painted on silk, organizing patches of bold colors into defined areas of highlight and shadow. Mai Trung Thu's early art celebrated folk themes and the innocence of rural Vietnam, and also suggested a nostalgia for the past.

In 1937 Mai Trung Thu visited France to take part in an exhibition. He settled there for most of the rest of his life and gained a reputation as a painter of doleful, lovely women. From 1938, Mai Thu regularly participated in Fine Arts Exhibitions in Paris. He participated with the painter Le Pho in the Grand Exhibition in Algiers in 1941. He was known as an expert player of the đàn bầu, a one stringed instrument, and also as a film-maker: He was also known as a film-maker who recorded Ho Chi Minh's visit to Paris in 1946.

== Works ==
Mai Thu has works in the Fine Arts Museum of Vietnam, and private collections, mainly in foreign countries. He held individual exhibitions with the topics: "Children of Mai Thu" (1964), "Women in Mai Thu’s Eyes" (1967) and "Mai Thu’s Poetic World" (1980) in Paris.
