= Pierre Le-Tan =

French illustrator and painter (1950–2019)

- Born: June 5, 1950
- Died: September 17, 2019 (aged 69)
- Occupations: Illustrator, painter

Pierre Le-Tan (1950 - 2019) was a French illustrator and painter.

== Biography ==
Pierre Le-Tan was born on June 5, 1950, in Neuilly-sur-Seine, Paris, to a Vietnamese father and French mother. His father Lê Phổ (1907–2001) was a painter and came to Paris to complete his studies at Beaux-Arts de Paris in 1937. Pierre learnt to draw from his father. It was on advice of an American friend of his mother that he sent his drawings to The New Yorker. At age 17, Le-Tan was commissioned by The New Yorker magazine for his first cover, which would mark the beginning of a long collaboration with many other American publications, such as Vogue, The Atlantic, Madame Figaro, Fortune and Harper's Bazaar.

Spanning over 50 years, Le-Tan's career spanned designing sets for films and theaters, to designing over 100 book covers and film posters. He died on September 17, 2019, in Villejuif.
