= Trần Văn Cẩn =

Vietnamese painter

- Born: Trần Văn Cẩn; August 13, 1910; Kiến An, Hải Phòng
- Died: July 31, 1994 (aged 83); Hanoi, Vietnam
- Education: Indochina College of Fine Arts
- Known for: Painting
- Notable work: Little Sister Thuy

Trần Văn Cẩn (Kiến An, now part of Hải Phòng city, 13 August 1910 – 31 July 1994) was a Vietnamese painter.

== Biography ==
Trần Văn Cẩn is a Hai Phonger. He was a student at the École des Beaux-Arts d'Indochine during the tenure of the French sculptor Évariste Jonchère from 1938 to 1944 and challenged his teacher to compare his French style with local sculpture for vigour.

Trần Văn Cẩn, Huu Ngoc and Vu Huyen co-wrote of one of the first books in English language on Vietnamese contemporary painters, (published in Hanoi in 1987), in which it states that Can was known for the fact he excelled in all the artistic media he took his hand to – lacquer, oil, wood block printing engraving, and was considered a pioneer in transforming lacquer from an artisan’s craft to an expressive medium for painting. He won first prize at the National Art Exhibitions 1960, 1967 and 1980.

As with biographies for all the painters included in the book, there is an emphasis on Nationalist affiliation and support, such as participating in the two wars for National Independence, rather than their influences and inspirations as artists.

Can et al. state that ‘Opposed to the colonialist conceptions held by the director of this college, he refused an official appointment to live on his art (at L’ecole des Beaux Arts de Indochine, which he graduated from in 1936). He worked in the Cultural Association for National Salvation before the 1945 August revolution…and contributed to the birth of a socialist and national art.’ However, both Taylor and Geringer Art Ltd. state that he did work at the L’ecole des Beaux Arts de Indochine, although specific dates are not given.

When he was a student at L’ecole des Beaux Arts de Indochine “ he was heavily influenced by Joseph Inguimberty (1896-1971) one of the founders of the school.” And according to Taylor the last French colonial governor in Vietnam organized an exhibition, which has been largely overlooked in Vietnamese records of the colonial period art, despite the fact that works by Tran Can Van, Nguyen Gia Tri, To Ngoc Van, Bui Xuan Phai displayed alongside well-known European artists, such as Jean-Antoine Watteau, Eugene Delacrois, Edgar Degas and Paul Cézanne. She goes on to suggest that had it not been for the politically-driven effort to establish an Independent state, the foreign artistic influences on the art practices and communities in Vietnam may have been more readily admitted to. Edwards argues, that the desire to establish a unique and distinct national identity is a natural reaction for a country that had been colonized and occupied.

However, another reason that Vietnamese artists were keen to deny French influence and emphasize their Nationalistic sympathies, is the influential paper by Truong Chinh, ‘Marxism and Vietnamese culture’ presented in a 1948 conference, which advocated that Social Realism should be the root of all creativity, and demanded “an active return to what is uniquely Vietnamese, or simply put, … asks for Vietnamization.”

This view was upheld by Ho Chi Minh, who did not want artists to become an elite intelligentsia; instead he directed them to relocate themselves among workers, peasants and soldiers in the battlefields, and serve ‘as agents for the government’s propaganda system, a situation that changed only after Doi Moi in the early 1990s.

Tran Van Can designed one of the first political posters, entitled “Vietnam for the Vietnamese” and the majority of his drawings and sketches from that time are of rural village life or on the battlefield.

Can went on to become the director of the Vietnam college of Fine Arts (1955–64), was the general secretary of the Vietnamese Fine Arts Association between 1958 and 1983, and in 1983 became the President of the Vietnamese association of Plastic Arts.

== Works ==
Many of his works are in the Vietnam National Museum of Fine Arts, Hanoi:

- painting "Little Sister Thuy" – a portrait of a young girl seated on a chair
- Lacquer painting "Winter coming"
- woodcut "Let's join the army" (1949)
- silk painting "You've made a mistake in reading, my child"

== Gallery ==
Little girl Thuy

Irrigation

Rural Girls, water color on rice paper

Bailing water on the field, water color on rice paper
