= Lê Phổ =

Vietnamese painter (1907–2001)

- Painter Lê Phổ
- Born: Lê Phổ; August 2, 1907; Thanh Xuân, Hà Nội, Tonkin, French Indochina
- Died: December 12, 2001 (aged 94); Paris, France
- Education: École Supérieure des Beaux Arts de l'Indochine, École des Beaux-Arts in Paris
- Known for: Painting
- Movement: Romanticism, Impressionism, Surrealism, School of Paris
- Spouse: Paulette Vaux
- Children: Pierre Le-Tan
- Patrons: Victor Tardieu

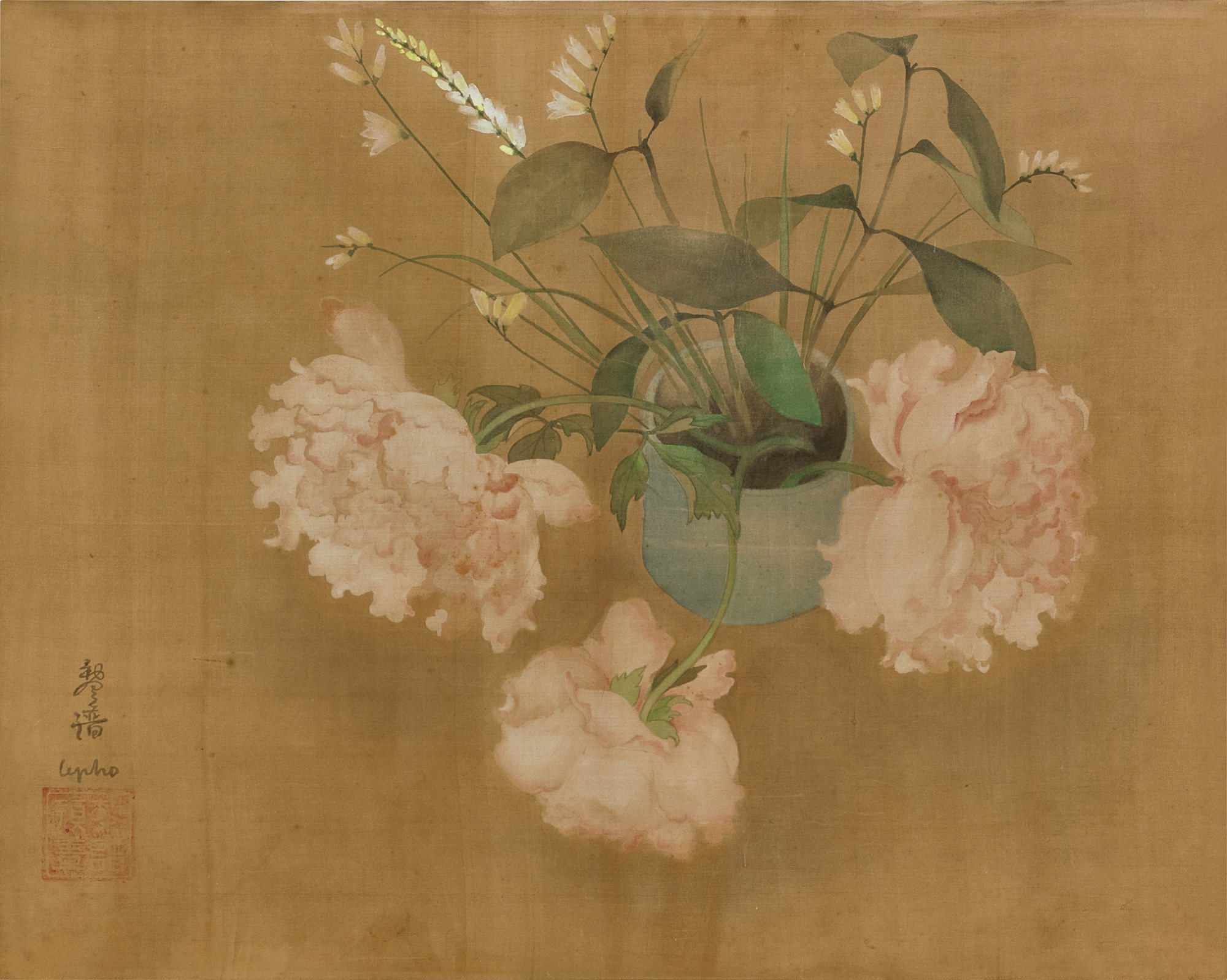
Peonies in a Vase, silk painting by Lê Phổ, c. 1932

Lê Phổ (2 August 1907 – 12 December 2001) was a Vietnamese painter associated with the School of Paris. He was among the early graduates of the École des Beaux-Arts de l'Indochine in Hanoi and established his career in Paris in the late 1930s. His paintings combined Vietnamese artistic traditions with European influences, often depicting women, flowers, and family life. He worked in both silk painting and oil painting, and his style developed across three major artistic periods.

== Life and career ==
His early education combined Chinese literary traditions with French schooling. At the age of sixteen, he entered the Professional School of Hanoi, also known as the Applied Arts School, where he studied drawing, painting, proportion, and colour. From 1925 until 1930, Le Pho studied at the Ecole des Beaux-Arts of Hanoi. At this point, he earned a scholarship to study at the École des Beaux-Arts in Paris, and he studied there for the next two years under the instruction of Victor Tardieu, a friend and companion of Henri Matisse. Upon returning to Vietnam he taught at the École Supérieure des Beaux Arts de l'Indochine in Hanoi.

In 1931, Lê Phổ travelled to Paris to help organize the exhibition of the École des Beaux-Arts de l'Indochine at the International Colonial Exhibition. His responsibilities included arranging paintings and sculptures in the Indochinese pavilion. During his stay in Europe, he also attended classes at the École Nationale des Beaux-Arts in Paris. After returning to Hanoi in 1932, he taught drawing at the Lycée Albert Sarraut and undertook artistic commissions, including portraits for Emperor Bảo Đại.

In 1937, he gave up his professorship to return to Paris as a part of the International Exposition in Paris as both a delegate and a member of the exposition's jury. In 1938, he had his first one-man show in Paris, a show which marked the beginning of his successful artistic career in Europe. He would go on to show his art across France in Paris, Nice, Lyon, and Rouen, as well as in Morocco, Brussels in Europe, and in New York.

Though he travelled for his shows, he continued to call Paris his home from 1937 until the time of his death in 2001. He was one of four EBAI graduates who made a career in Paris, including Mai Trung Thứ, Vũ Cao Đàm and female painter Lê Thị Lựu.

In 2025, Lê Phổ's work was featured in City of Others: Asian Artists in Paris, 1920s–1940s, an exhibition held at National Gallery Singapore.

== Artistic periods ==
=== Early period ===
Le Pho's work is often divided into three distinct styles. The first style is from his period in Hanoi, and on to his first couple years in Paris. In works from this period we see depictions of the Vietnamese landscape of Le Pho's youth, paintings steeped with nostalgia and the historical magnificence of the country.

=== Romanet period ===
Following this style came what is commonly known as Le Pho's Romanet period, named after the French gallery owner who became Le Pho's major promoter. During the Romanet period, generally dated from 1946 to 1962, Lê Phổ continued painting on silk while introducing more intense colours into his compositions. His works frequently explored themes of motherhood and family relationships. He also experimented with mixed media, incorporating oil paint into works that drew on traditional gouache and ink techniques. Paintings such as Mère et Enfant (Mother and Child) and Les Baigneuses (The Bathers) illustrate his interest in Vietnamese subjects during this period.

=== Findlay period ===
In 1963, Le Pho's work was noticed by the American gallerist Wally Findlay, owner of Findlay galleries, who ordered many of his canvases and sold them to the American market, marking the beginning of Le Pho's final artistic period, his Findlay Period. During this period, he increasingly worked in oil on canvas and continued to depict Vietnamese women in lush landscapes.

During the Findlay period, Lê Phổ's paintings became increasingly colourful, with bolder brushstrokes and a brighter palette. His use of colour has been associated with his admiration for the French painter Henri Matisse. Flower arrangements became an important subject in his later work, alongside his established interest in Vietnamese women and garden scenes.

== Artistic style and techniques ==
Lê Phổ painted scenery of Vietnam, still life with flowers, family settings and portraits. Vietnamese women, most often portrayed as elongated figures evoking the influence of surrealism, are a recurrent theme in his work.

Lê Phổ's artistic practice combined techniques associated with European painting and materials traditionally used in Vietnamese art. During his training at the École des Beaux-Arts de l'Indochine, students were introduced to Western approaches to painting while also experimenting with silk and lacquer. Lê Phổ subsequently worked in both oil painting and silk painting.

In addition to painting, Lê Phổ also worked with lacquer and was involved in decoration, fashion, and jewellery design.

== Selected artworks ==
Harmony in Green: The Two Sisters (1938) is a painting by Lê Phổ in the collection of National Gallery Singapore. Created using ink and gouache on silk, the work measures 54 × 45 cm and depicts two women in traditional clothing against a green landscape. The painting is recorded in the museum's collection under accession number 1999-00302.

In November 2015, the painting was featured in National Gallery Singapore's My Masterpiece campaign. Singaporean fashion designer Ashley Isham selected the work and described how its depiction of two sisters reminded him of his younger sisters, while the garden landscape brought back memories of home.

The painting was also exhibited in City of Others: Asian Artists in Paris, 1920s–1940s, held at National Gallery Singapore from 2 April to 17 August 2025. The exhibition explored the experiences and artistic activities of Asian artists in Paris during the early twentieth century.
