= Silk painting =

Painted artwork on silk

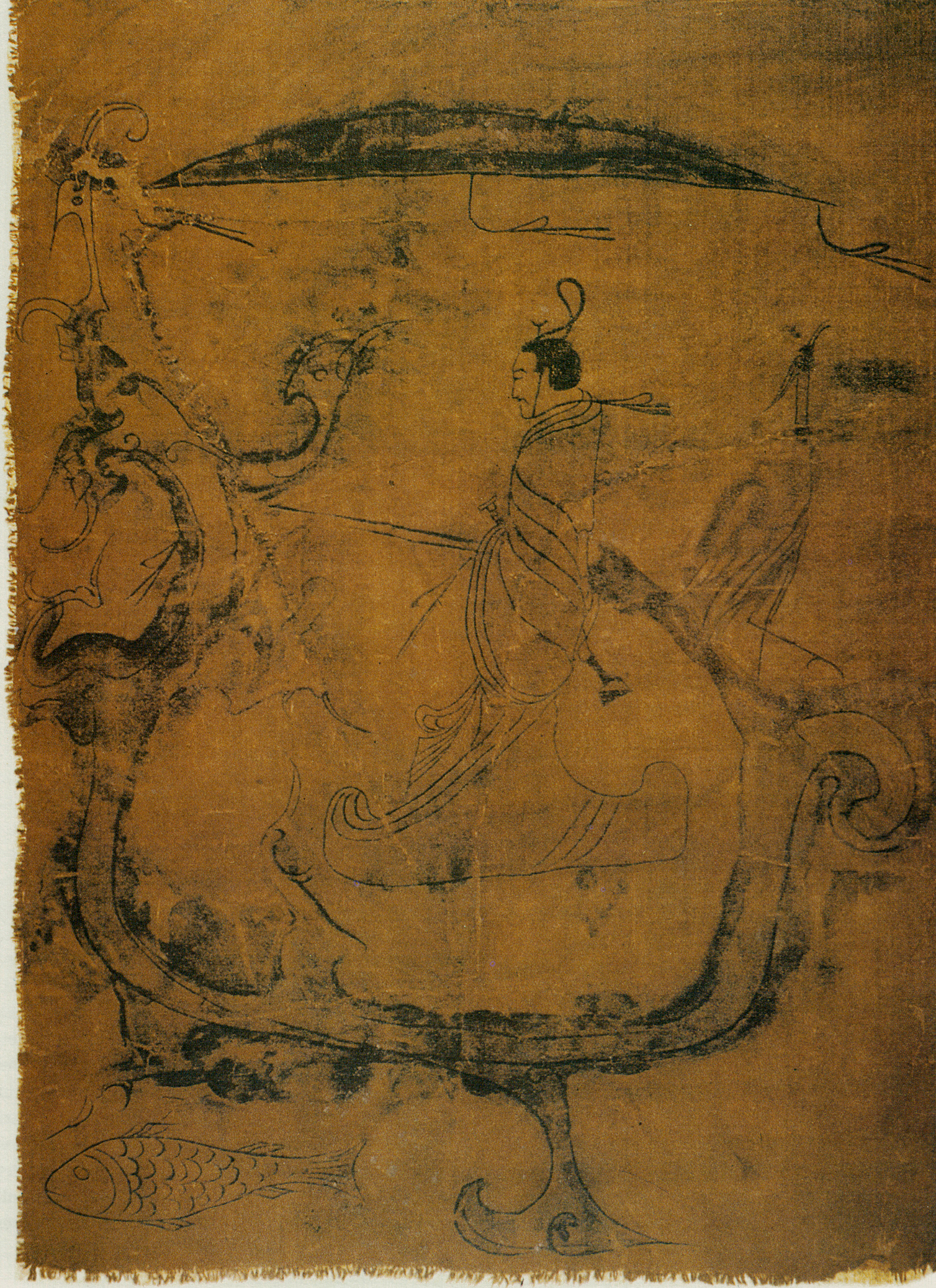
Painting of a dragon (China)

Silk painting refers to paintings on silk. They are a traditional way of painting in Asia. Methods vary, but using traditional supplies of 100% silk fabric, stretched in a frame, and applying textile paints or dyes are the beginnings of the process of making textile art.

== National styles ==
=== China ===
One of the earliest surviving Chinese silk paintings is a 2-metre long T-shaped painting, dated from around 165 BCE, from the Mawangdui. However, painting on silk quickly gave way to painting on other supports.

Silk painting employs gutta as a resist, allowing fine patterns to be achieved.

=== Vietnam ===
==== Ancient period ====
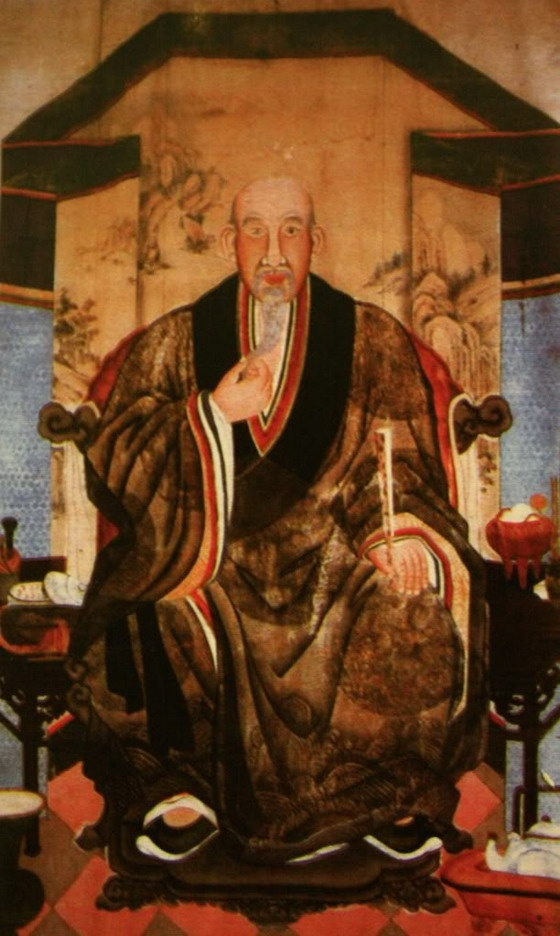
Silk painting of Trịnh Đình Kiên (1715 - 1786) in 18th century, exhibited in Vietnam National Museum of Fine Arts.

Silk painting (Tranh lụa) was a traditional artisanry in Vietnam. There have been some old silk paintings, e.g. portraits of Nguyễn Trãi, Phùng Khắc Khoan, Trịnh Đình Kiên, Phan Huy Cẩn, Phan Huy Ích, Phan Huy Thực, and Phan Huy Vịnh dated from Lê and Nguyễn dynasty.

==== Modern period ====
Silk paintings of the modern period in Vietnam were taken up by some of the students and French teachers at the Ecole des Beaux-Arts de l'Indochine (EBAI) in Hanoi during the 1930s. The earliest representative of the new interest in silk painting at a 1931 Paris exhibition of silk paintings was Nguyễn Phan Chánh, a student of EBAI who had originally trained in calligraphy, and who struggled with French oil techniques, and so whom the school director Victor Tardieu encouraged to use traditional media.
