= Nguyễn Khang (painter) =

Vietnamese painter

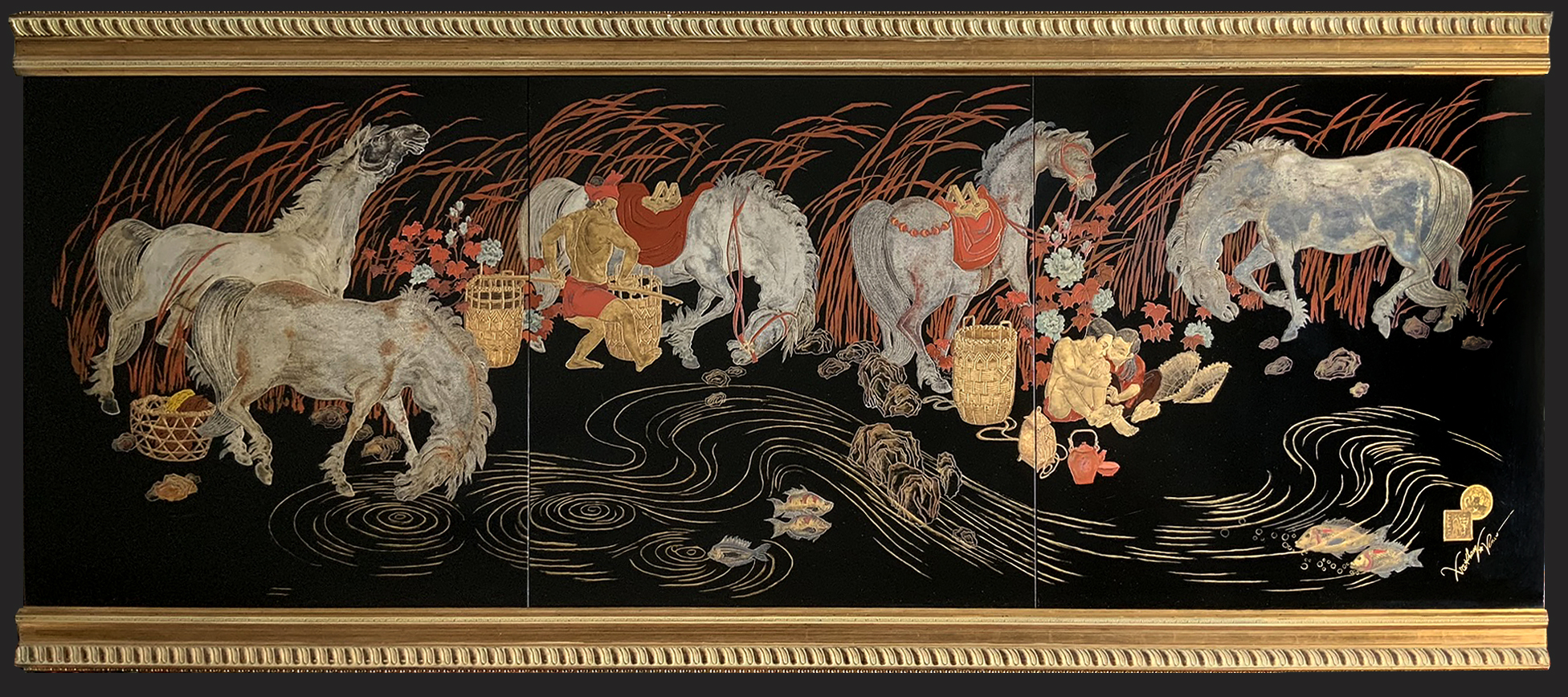
Lacquer painting that includes engravings plus gold and silver pigments. Made in collaboration by the artists Nguyen Khang and Nguyen Kim Diep. The painting depicts a scene with a family of horse trainers in Vietnamese environment.

Nguyễn Khang (5 February 1912 in Hanoi – 15 November 1989) was a Vietnamese painter who specialized in lacquer painting, sometimes with relief work.

A few of his works are in the Vietnam National Museum of Fine Arts, Hanoi, but most are in private collections.

== Selected works ==
- Fishing under Moon Light 1943
- Uncle Ho Visiting the Villages 1958
- Troops fording a stream 1960

Love -2020
