= Joseph Inguimberty =

French painter

Joseph Inguimberty (18 January 1896, in Marseille – 8 October 1971, in Menton) was a French painter, and teacher at the École des Beaux-Arts de l'Indochine (EBAI) in Hanoi 1926–1945. His teaching was appreciated for being less academic than the director Victor Tardieu. He shared with Tardieu a keen interest in Vietnam's culture. Inguimberty encouraged his students to experiment with lacquer painting as a fine art painting medium.
