= Xuân Diệu =

Vietnamese poet, journalist, and literary critic

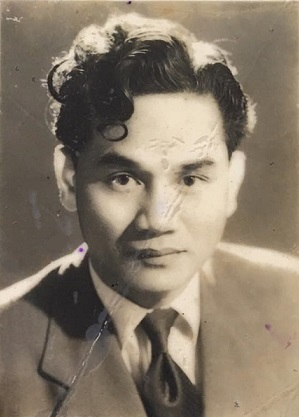
- Xuân Diệu in his youth.
- Born: February 2, 1916; Phước Hòa Commune, Tuy Phước District, Bình Định, French Indochina
- Died: December 18, 1985 (aged 69); Hanoi, Vietnam
- Resting place: Mai Dịch Cemetery, Hanoi, Vietnam
- Occupations: Poet, journalist, literary critic
- Writing career
- Pen name: Xuân Diệu, Trảo Nha
- Language: Vietnamese
- Period: 1936–1985
- Notable works: Thơ thơ; Gửi hương cho gió (1945); Ngọn quốc kỳ (1945); Một khối hồng (1964); Hai đợt sóng (1967)
- Notable awards: Ho Chi Minh Prize
- Movement: Thơ mới

Ngô Xuân Diệu (Vietnamese: [swən˧˧ ziəw˧˨ʔ]; February 2, 1916 – December 18, 1985) was a Vietnamese poet, journalist, short-story writer, and literary critic, best known as one of the prominent figures of the twentieth-century Thơ mới (New Poetry) Movement.

Heralded by critics as "the newest of the New Poets" and "the king of love poetry", (Note: "nhà thơ mới nhất trong những nhà thơ mới" and "ông hoàng thơ tình", respectively) Xuân Diệu rose to popularity with the collection Thơ thơ (1938), which demonstrates a distinct voice influenced by Western literature, notably French symbolism. Between 1936 and 1944, his poetry was characterized by a desperation for love, juxtaposed with a desire to live and to experience the beauty of the world. After joining the Vietnamese Communist Party in 1945, the themes of his works shifted towards the Party and their resistance against the French and the Americans. When he died in 1985, he left behind about 450 poems, as well as several short stories, essays, and literary criticisms.

Although his love poems use expressions and pronouns that are ambiguous on whether the writer is gay or heterosexual, (Note: In Vietnamese, the pronouns anh (male, older) and em (gender-neutral, younger) are used to represent the speaker and the listener in both male homosexual and heterosexual relationships, assuming a difference in age between the two partners. Xuân Diệu's poems extensively use both of these pronouns.) Xuân Diệu was confirmed by many, including his close friends, to be the former. According to the writer Tô Hoài, his homosexuality was known amongst his fellow soldiers during their time in the revolutionary base, which had at some point led to admonishments from the military. To this day, the impact of his sexual orientation on his poetry remains a topic of discussion.

== Life ==
Ngô Xuân Diệu was born in his mother's hometown of Gò Bồi in Phước Hòa Commune, Tuy Phước District, Bình Định Province. His father was Ngô Xuân Thọ, and his mother was Nguyễn Thị Hiệp. Due to Vietnamese traditions, only the hometown of a child's father would be counted as the hometown of the child, thus his official hometown was the village of Trảo Nha in Can Lộc District, Hà Tĩnh Province. Later in his life, he would use the name of the village as a pseudonym.

Xuân Diệu lived in Tuy Phước District until he was eleven years old, when he traveled southward to study in Quy Nhơn.

=== Entry into literature ===
In 1936, Xuân Diệu was enrolled in the lycée Khải Định in Huế, where he met the young poet Huy Cận and received his baccalauréat in 1937. He then left for Hanoi, where he studied law and joined the left-wing Self-Strengthening Literary Union (Tự Lực văn đoàn), mostly composed of young Vietnamese writers who studied under the colonial education system and were well-versed in both Vietnamese and Western literature. He was a late comer to the group, which by then had established themselves as a powerful platform for Vietnamese intellectuals, publishing romance novels that entertained the crowd alongside satirical works that lambasted both contemporary society and the French administration. Amongst his peers in the group was Thế Lữ, whose fantastical poetry and horror short stories were inspired by French romanticism and Edgar Allan Poe. According to literary critics Hoài Thanh and Hoài Chân, Xuân Diệu borrowed the same inspiration from romanticism, yet he "burned the utopian scenery and ushered the audience back into the real world."They acknowledged Charles Baudelaire's influence on Xuân Diệu, compared aspects of his poetry to Anna de Noailles and André Gide, and judged him as the pinnacle of French-influenced Vietnamese poetry.

=== First Indochina War ===
Between 1938 and 1940, Xuân Diệu lived with poet and alleged partner Huy Cận at 40 Hàng Than Street in Hanoi. After Japan entered French Indochina in September 1940, many members of Xuân Diệu's literary group began to focus entirely on politics, including the founder Nhất Linh. Near the end of the year, Xuân Diệu departed for Mỹ Tho and worked as an official. Some of the remaining members, including Khái Hưng, Hoàng Đạo and Nguyễn Gia Trí, were arrested by the French and imprisoned in the faraway Sơn La Prison, marking the beginning of the demise of the group. When Xuân Diệu returned to Hanoi in 1942, most of the writers with whom he once worked had drifted apart or considered joining the anti-colonial resistance led by Ho Chi Minh. He pursued writing as a full-time career for two years, before joining the revolutionaries in Việt Bắc in 1944. Instead of combatting on the front line, Xuân Diệu stayed behind to write in support of the independence movement. In the memoir Cát bụi chân ai of the writer Tô Hoài, it was also during this time that Xuân Diệu had a few sexual encounters with his comrades, including Tô Hoài himself, and was reprimanded by the commanders.

=== Interwar period ===
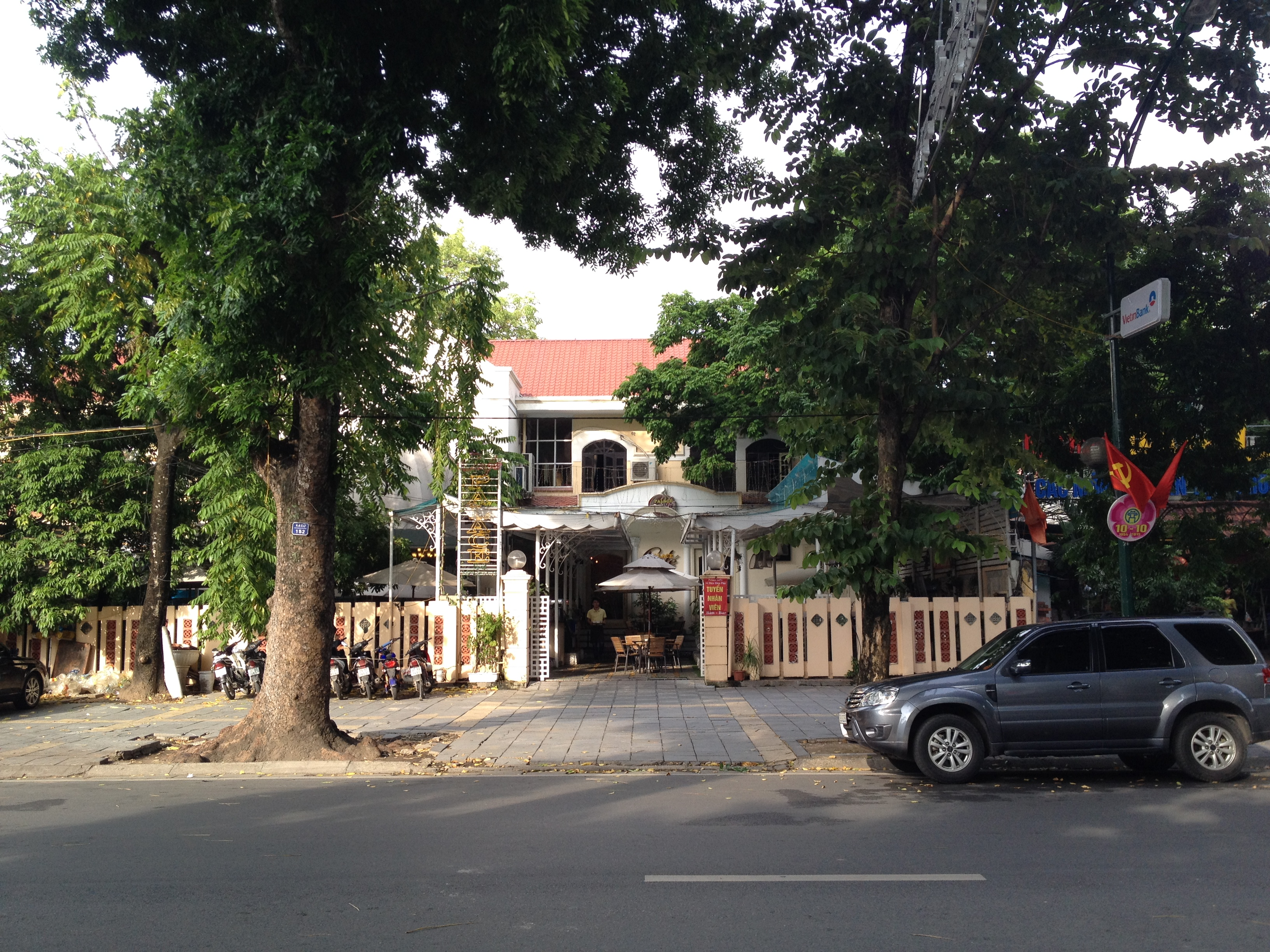
A house on Điện Biên Phủ Road, formerly Cột Cờ Road. Xuân Diệu lived at 24 Cột Cờ Road, in an apartment above Huy Cận's family until his death in 1985.

After the Việt Minh gained victory in 1954, Xuân Diệu returned to Hanoi and published both as a poet and as a journalist. In 1956, he married 27-year-old director Bạch Diệp, but the relationship was not consummated and the pair quickly separated. While Bạch Diệp was later remarried to another man, Xuân Diệu lived alone in an apartment right above the house of Huy Cận, who was now married to Xuân Diệu's younger sister, Ngô Xuân Như.

Between 1955 and June 1958, Xuân Diệu was embroiled in the famous Nhân Văn-Giai Phẩm affair. As the First Indochina War had come to an end, and some reforms of the new administration had led to disastrous results, dissenting voices began to rise amongst those who had supported the Việt Minh and were now demanding the freedom to criticize the wrongdoings of the government. Although the government did come to admit their mistakes, the movement soon developed from criticism of the government to personal attacks and calls for a major overhaul, causing a rift between pro-government writers and dissenters like Lê Đạt or Trần Dần. In the end, Xuân Diệu, along with Huy Cận and others, took the side of the government; in a scathing response published in May 1958, he accused the likes of Lê Đạt, Hoàng Cầm and Trần Dần of "capitalistic individualism" and "attempting to poison our atmosphere of prose and poetry, which means that we should wipe them out, that we should cleanse them."

=== Later years ===
As tensions rose between North and South Vietnam leading up to the Vietnam War, Xuân Diệu continued to write in support of the communist efforts against U.S. and South Vietnamese forces. He also translated a variety of foreign-language writers, including Nâzım Hikmet, Nicolás Guillén, and Alexander Pushkin. His first works of literary analysis, released in the late 1950s and throughout the 1960s, explored the cultural significance of classic Vietnamese poets like Nguyễn Du and Hồ Xuân Hương, the latter of whom was given the sobriquet "the Queen of Nôm poetry" that is still invoked by other writers generations later.

In the last two decades of his life, Xuân Diệu became an advocate for young writers. He wrote the book Conversation with Young Poets in 1961 to give some advice both as an experienced writer and as an enthusiast who wished to see Vietnamese poetry flourish in the future. When a ten-year-old boy named Trần Đăng Khoa from Hải Dương Province gained attention with his flair for poetry, Xuân Diệu himself went to meet the boy and offered to proofread his first poetry collection. In his later reminiscences, Khoa remarked on how Xuân Diệu mentored him as he grew up and changed his writing style. By the time Khoa became an adult, he visited the senile poet at his apartment in Hanoi and noticed that Xuân Diệu had become occupied with thoughts of death and old age, yet devoted himself to writing poetry anyway.

=== Death ===
On December 18, 1985, Xuân Diệu died at his home from a sudden heart attack. His life-long friend Huy Cận was said to have demanded that the funeral be postponed until he could come back from Dakar, Senegal; to his dismay, the funeral was carried out soon after and was attended by a lot of Vietnamese artists at the time, including Xuân Diệu's ex-wife Bạch Diệp and composer Văn Cao, whom he had publicly insulted during the Nhân Văn-Giai Phẩm affair. Xuân Diệu was laid to rest in Mai Dịch Cemetery on the outskirts of Hanoi.

== Works ==
A prolific writer, Xuân Diệu left behind an abundance of poems, short stories, notes, and essays. His two major poetry collections are Thơ thơ (1938) and Gửi hương cho gió (Casting Fragrance to the Wind, 1945), and his only published short story collection is titled Phấn thông vàng (Gold Pine Pollens, 1939).

=== Poetry ===
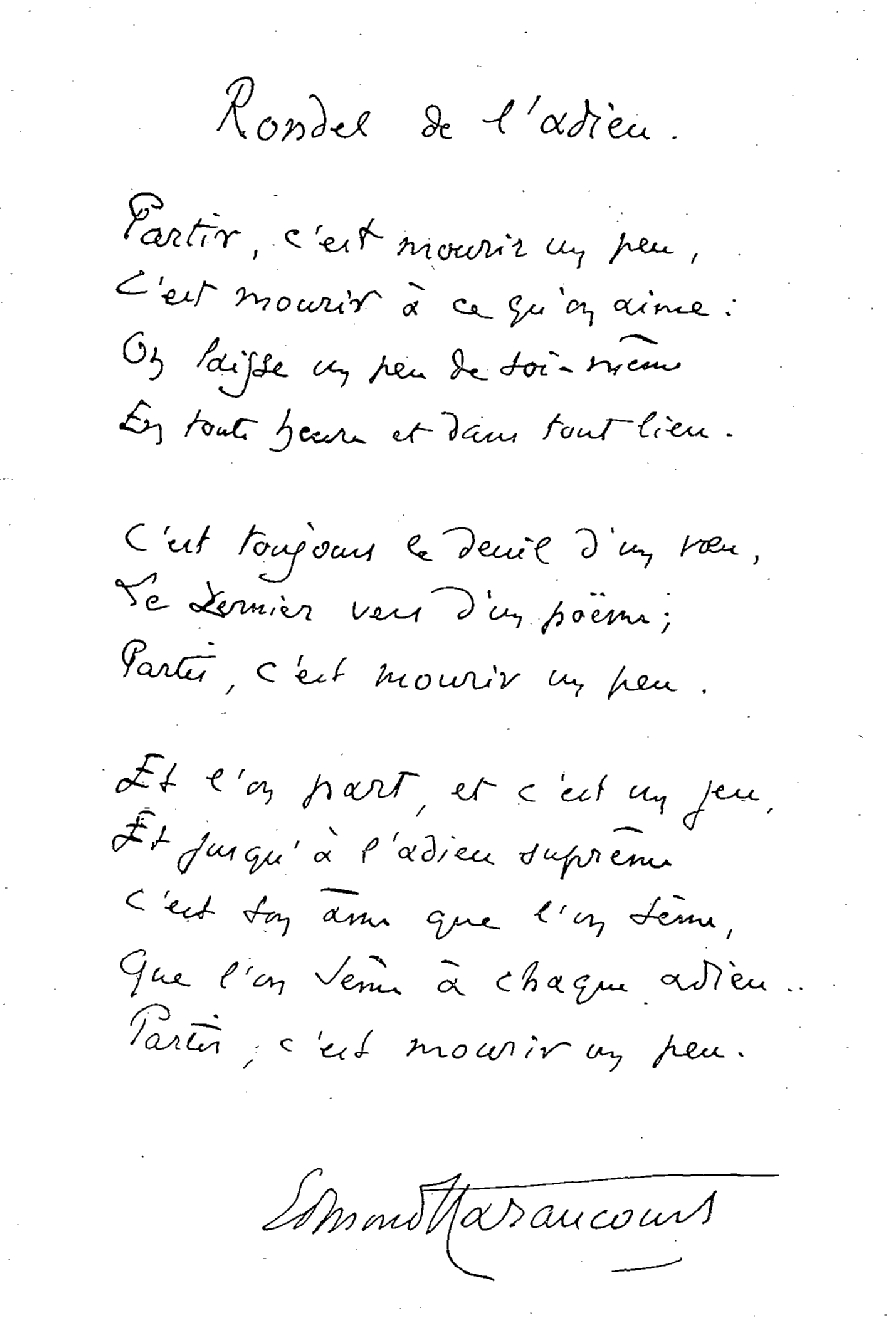
Haraucourt's "Rondel de l'adieu".

The writing style of Xuân Diệu, along with the French influence on his poetry, is best exemplified in the collection Thơ thơ (1938). The title of the collection itself is hard to be translated, for the second word "thơ" can mean both "poetry" or "young", giving rise to two possible interpretations: either "young poetry" or "poetic poetry". Both interpretations fit with the general ideas of the collection, which praises youth and the glory of life through a combination of symbolic imagery and multiple poetic devices. An often-cited excerpt that reflects these ideas comes from the poem "Yêu" ("Love"):

Love is just a little bit of death in the heart,
For how often can one love in certainty that love will be returned?
Giving so much love, and receiving so little of it;
Because people are fickle, or indifferent? Who knows?

(Neil Jamieson's translation)

The opening line was inspired by its equivalent in Edmond Haraucourt's "Rondel de l'adieu": "Partir, c'est mourir un peu". At the same time, the overall sentiment of the four lines is shared by other poems in the collection, which express the speaker's pessimism with regards to love, along with his fear of disappointment. In the poem "Vội vàng" ("In Haste"), which is currently included in Vietnam's high school curriculum, Xuân Diệu also described an obsession with the passage of time and the existential dread that nature "does not prolong the youth of mankind". These feelings have been attributed by some recent writers to him grappling with his sexual orientation, but whatever the case might be, the fears and obsessions are all in accord with the speaker's eventual yearning for intimacy and the decision to rebel against the brevity of life. In his foreword to Gửi hương cho gió (Casting Fragrance to the Wind, 1945), Xuân Diệu wrote:

Perched on a branch, the bird longs for its brook—
it will break into song and not know why.
Its ditties cannot make the fruits grow ripe;
its carols cannot help the flowers bloom.
It's profitless to sing, and yet the bird
will burst its throat and heart to sing its best.

(Huỳnh Sanh Thông's translation)

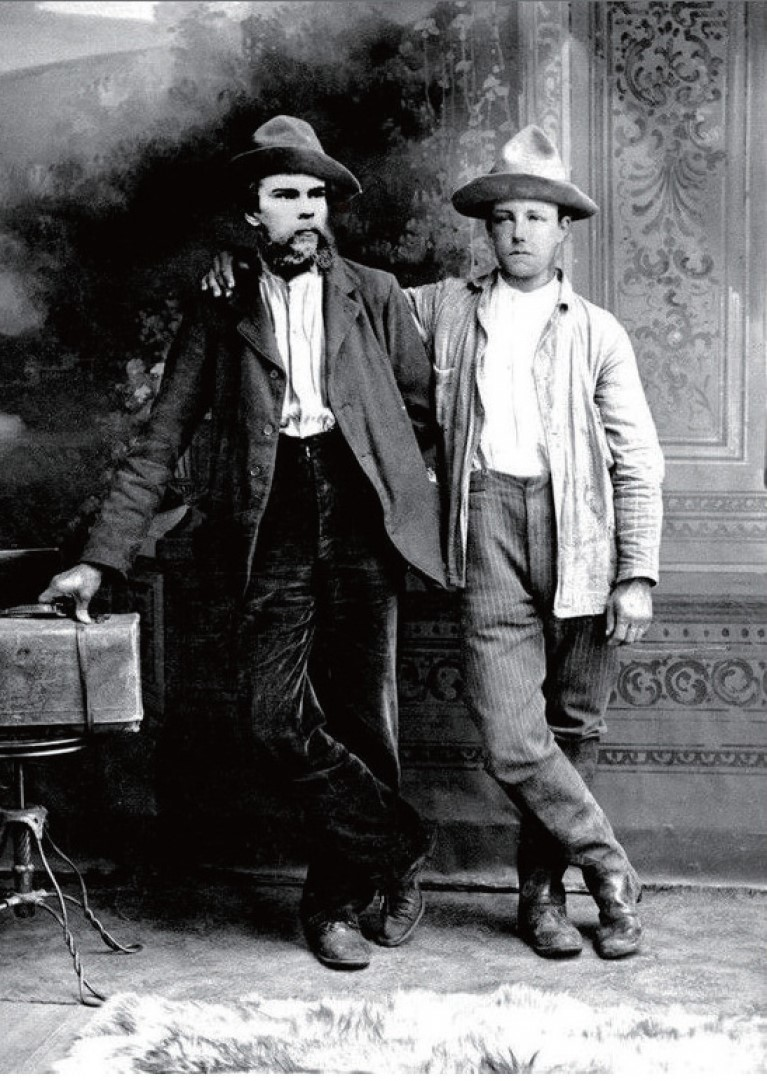
French poets Paul Verlaine and Arthur Rimbaud, whose relationship was glorified in Xuân Diệu's poem "Tình trai" ("Male Love").

In their analysis, critics Hoài Thanh and Hoài Chân viewed that the liveliness in the verse of Xuân Diệu was emblematic of the Vietnamese youth at the time, who had just been exposed to an immense world and, consequently, "the dreariness of the universe and the tragedy of the human fate". In the face of his epiphany, the youthful man chose to cling to love and reject everything. Such is the idea that also runs through "Tình trai" ("Male Love"), a poem in praise of the relationship between Paul Verlaine and Arthur Rimbaud that tends to be referenced as proof of Xuân Diệu's homosexuality:

I remember Rimbaud with Verlaine,
Two male poets, dizzy from drink,
Drunk with strange poems, in love with friendship,
Contemptuous of worn out forms, abandoning familiar ways.

With parallel steps they tread their journey home,
Two souls with flowery fragrance fresh,
They go—weak hand in strong,
Sharing love songs in breezy mists.

They speak nothing of yesterday or tomorrow;
Forget painted lips and colorful shirts;
Ignore concerns over heaven and hell!
No negotiation possible, they love each other.

After the August Revolution in 1945, these sentiments are less noticeable in his verse, which by then had shifted towards praising the struggles of the people and Ho Chi Minh's independence movement. Like many other intellectuals of his time, including Huy Cận, Thế Lữ, and Nguyễn Huy Tưởng, he was described to have been "enlightened" (giác ngộ) and graced with a new purpose to live. He was involved in the early years of both the Vietnamese Writers' Association and the Journalists' Association, and his writings after the First Indochina War showed a commitment to Marxism-Leninism.

== Personal life ==
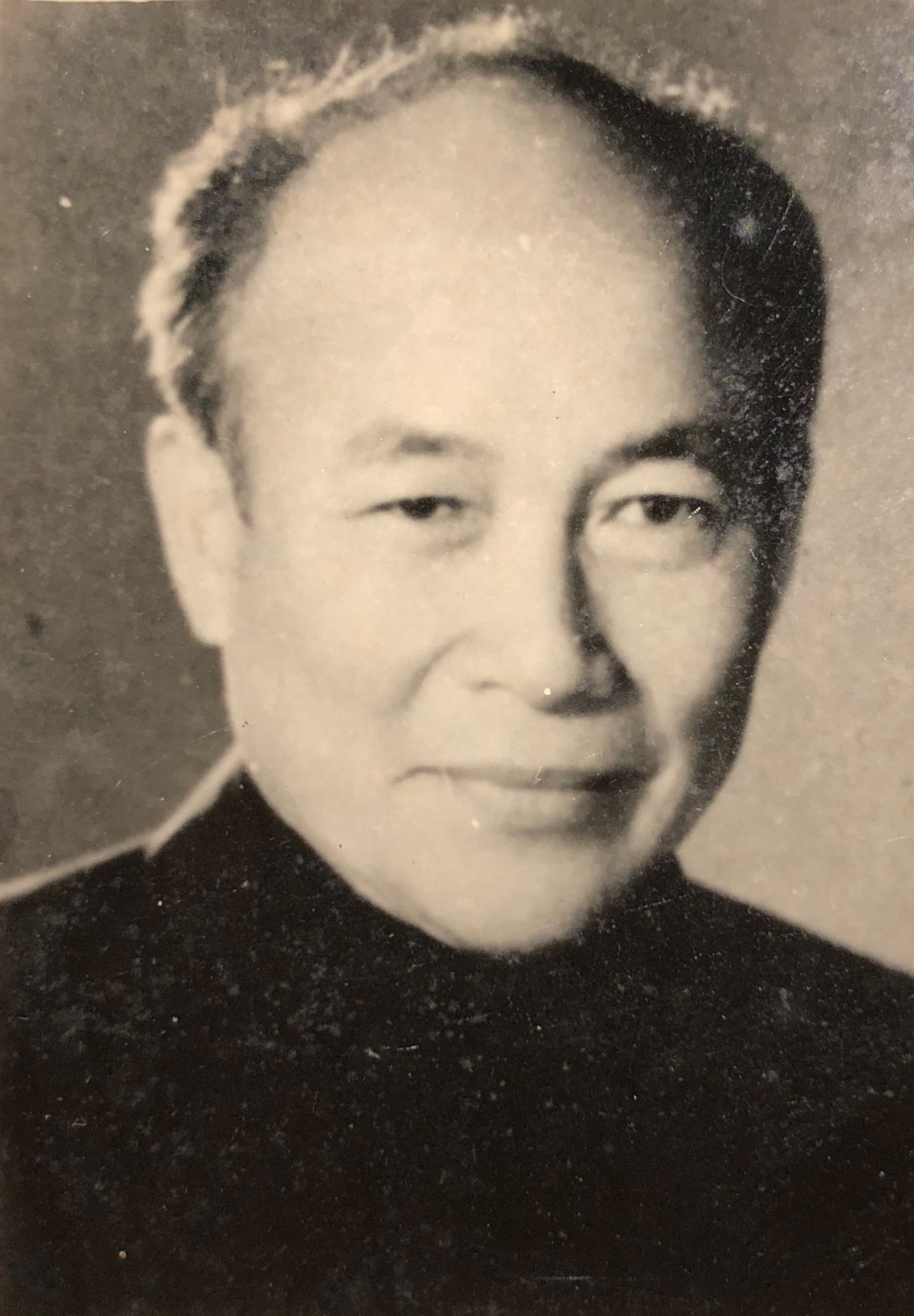
Tô Hoài was a close partner of Xuân Diệu.

Despite his bold literary persona, Xuân Diệu was a secretive individual, with most of the tales regarding his private life being told by his acquaintances before and after his death. His companionship with Huy Cận, with whom he shared a house between 1938 and 1940, has been depicted by Vietnamese and Western sources alike as both an intimate friendship and a romantic relationship. Huy Cận himself spoke of the time he lived with Xuân Diệu in the poem "Ngủ chung" ("Sleeping Together") from his debut collection Lửa thiêng (Sacred Fire, 1940).

Another alleged muse of his was the poet Hoàng Cát, to whom he referred by the kinship term "em" (the common second-person pronoun for women in a heterosexual relationship) in a farewell poem that he penned when Hoàng Cát left for the front line in 1965. Hoàng Cát was much younger than Xuân Diệu, and in a 2013 interview, he said that he was aware of Xuân Diệu's affections towards him but did not reciprocate them, for he "did not love Xuân Diệu in the way that men and women love one another."

In his memoir Cát bụi chân ai (Dusty Sand on Somebody's Footsteps, 1992), the writer Tô Hoài recalled one of the nights in Việt Bắc in which Xuân Diệu was reprimanded by the military commanders:

"Xuân Diệu just sat and cried. Who knows whether Nam Cao, Nguyễn Huy Tưởng, Trọng Hứa, Nguyễn Văn Mãi, and even lão Hiến, Nghiêm Bình, as well as Đại, Đắc, Tô Sang, and a bunch of other guys had slept with Xuân Diệu or not; naturally, nobody admitted it. I was also silent as a clam. During those wild moments in the seductive darkness of night, I also went a bit crazy— Xuân Diệu was not by any stretch of the imagination alone in this regard. Nobody specifically mentioned these episodes [of homosexual love], but everybody raised their voices, raised their voices severely, harsely criticizing his "bourgeois thinking, his evil bourgeois thinking, which needed to be fixed." Xuân Diệu sobbed and said, "it's my homosexuality [tình trai]... my homosexuality," choking on his words with tears flowing, but not promising to fix anything at all."

== Legacy and recognition ==
In their monumental book of literary criticism, Thi nhân Việt Nam (1932–1941), Hoài Thanh and Hoài Chân recounted the initial surprise and hesitation amongst contemporary Vietnamese writers when Xuân Diệu entered their world with his heavily French-inspired poetry. Nevertheless, as they grew more familiar with the young poet, they "realized that within the graceful elegance of his poetic style was something quintessentially Vietnamese, and [the writers] were all charmed." Indeed, Xuân Diệu's new voice has left a considerable impact on modern Vietnamese literature, earning him the Hồ Chí Minh Prize in 1996. Many of his compositions have been set to music, while poems like "Đây mùa thu tới" ("Here Comes Autumn") and "Vội vàng" ("In Haste") have been included in consecutive versions of the official literature curriculum for Vietnamese high school students.

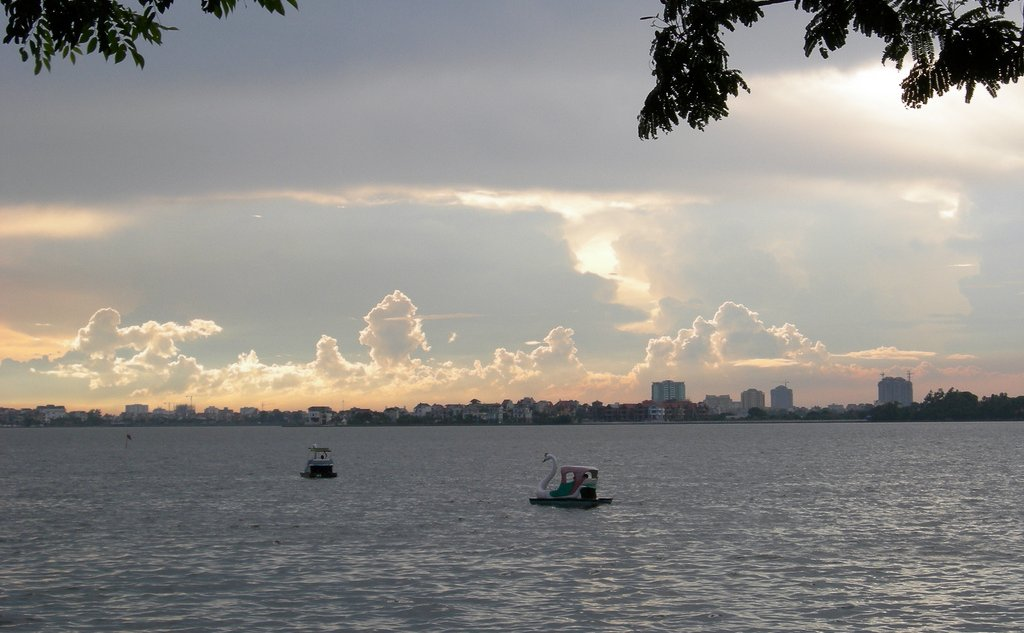
A view of West Lake, Hanoi.

A memorial hall dedicated to him was built in his home village of Trảo Nha, Can Lộc District, Hà Tĩnh Province. Many roads and streets are also named after him, including an avenue in Quy Nhơn and a street by the West Lake of Hanoi, which runs through an area where most of the streets bear the names of other notable Vietnamese artists like Trịnh Công Sơn and Tô Ngọc Vân.

The love poetry of Xuân Diệu, particularly those compiled in Thơ thơ (1938) and Gửi hương cho gió (Casting Fragrance to the Wind, 1945), is still cherished to this day, with Xuân Diệu being hailed as "the King of Love Poetry" (ông hoàng thơ tình), in the same vein as the sobriquet that he had given to the eighteenth-century poet Hồ Xuân Hương. In his own anthology Chân dung và đối thoại (Portraits and Dialogues, 1998), the poet Trần Đăng Khoa, who was now forty years old, attributed this quote to his late mentor:

"The writer exists in his works. Without his works, the writer might as well be dead."

=== Recognition of homosexuality ===
Despite many Vietnamese literature textbooks and educators assuming a sole, heteronormative reading of Xuân Diệu's works, there has been a growing academic and societal pushback against it, arguing that the involvement of his homosexuality in his works should be accounted for, notably in the Thơ thơ collection and the poem "Tình trai", with some sources regarding Xuân Diệu's work as some of the first openly queer literature works in contemporary Vietnam.

== Major works ==
=== Poetry ===
- Thơ thơ (1938) – collection of 46 poems
- Gửi hương cho gió (Casting Fragrance to the Wind, 1945) – collection of 51 poems
- "Ngọn quốc kỳ" ("The National Flag", 1945) – long poem
- Dưới sao vàng (Under the Yellow Star, 1949) – collection of 27 poems
- Ngôi sao (The Star, 1955) – collection of 41 poems
- Riêng chung (1960) – collection of 49 poems
- Mũi Cà Mau – Cầm tay (Cape Cà Mau – Holding Hands, 1962) – collection of 49 poems
- Tôi giàu đôi mắt (1970) – collection of 23 poems
- Thanh ca (1982)
- Tuyển tập Xuân Diệu (1983)

=== Prose ===
- Phấn thông vàng (Gold Pine Pollens, 1939) – collection of 17 short stories

=== Essays ===
- Những bước đường tư tưởng của tôi (My Ideological Footsteps, 1958) – memoir
- Ba thi hào dân tộc (Three Great Poets of the People, 1959) – analysis of the poetry of Nguyễn Trãi, Nguyễn Du, and Hồ Xuân Hương
- Hồ Xuân Hương bà chúa thơ Nôm (Hồ Xuân Hương, the Queen of Nôm Poetry, 1961)
- Trò chuyện với các bạn làm thơ trẻ (Conversation with Young Poets, 1961) – collection of essays
- Thi hào dân tộc Nguyễn Du (Nguyễn Du, the Great Poet of the People, 1966) – notes and essay
- Thơ Trần Tế Xương (The Poetry of Trần Tế Xương, 1970)
- Đọc thơ Nguyễn Khuyến (Reading the Poetry of Nguyễn Khuyến, 1971)
- Các nhà thơ cổ điển Việt Nam (Classical Poets of Vietnam, 1981, 1982) – two-volume book of literary analysis

== Bibliography ==
- Hoài, Thanh; Hoài, Chân (2006). Thi nhân Việt Nam (1932–1941) [Poets of Vietnam (1932–1941)] (in Vietnamese). Nhà xuất bản Văn học.
- Ân, Lại Nguyên; Holcombe, Alec (2010). "The Heart and Mind of the Poet Xuân Diệu: 1954–1958". Journal of Vietnamese Studies. 5 (2): 7. doi:10.1525/vs.2010.5.2.1.
