= Thơ thơ =

Debut poem collection by Xuân Diệu

- by Xuân Diệu
- Country: Vietnam
- Language: Vietnamese
- Genre: Love poetry
- Publisher: Đời nay Publishing House
- Publication date: December 1938

Thơ thơ (lit. 'Poetry poetry') is a Vietnamese love poem collection authored by Xuân Diệu as his debut work. It consisted of 46 poems, and was published in December 1938 by the Đời nay Publishing House.

Considered as one of Xuân Diệu's magna opera, Thơ thơ introduced themes such as individuality, the irreversibility of time, infatuation, and Western perceptions of romance to Vietnamese poetry. It was seen by many Vietnamese critics and literary researchers as a prominent focal point of 19th-century French romanticist and symbolist influence on Vietnamese poetry, particularly through the works of Charles Baudelaire, and helped earned Xuân Diệu's title of being "the newest of the New Poets".

== Background ==
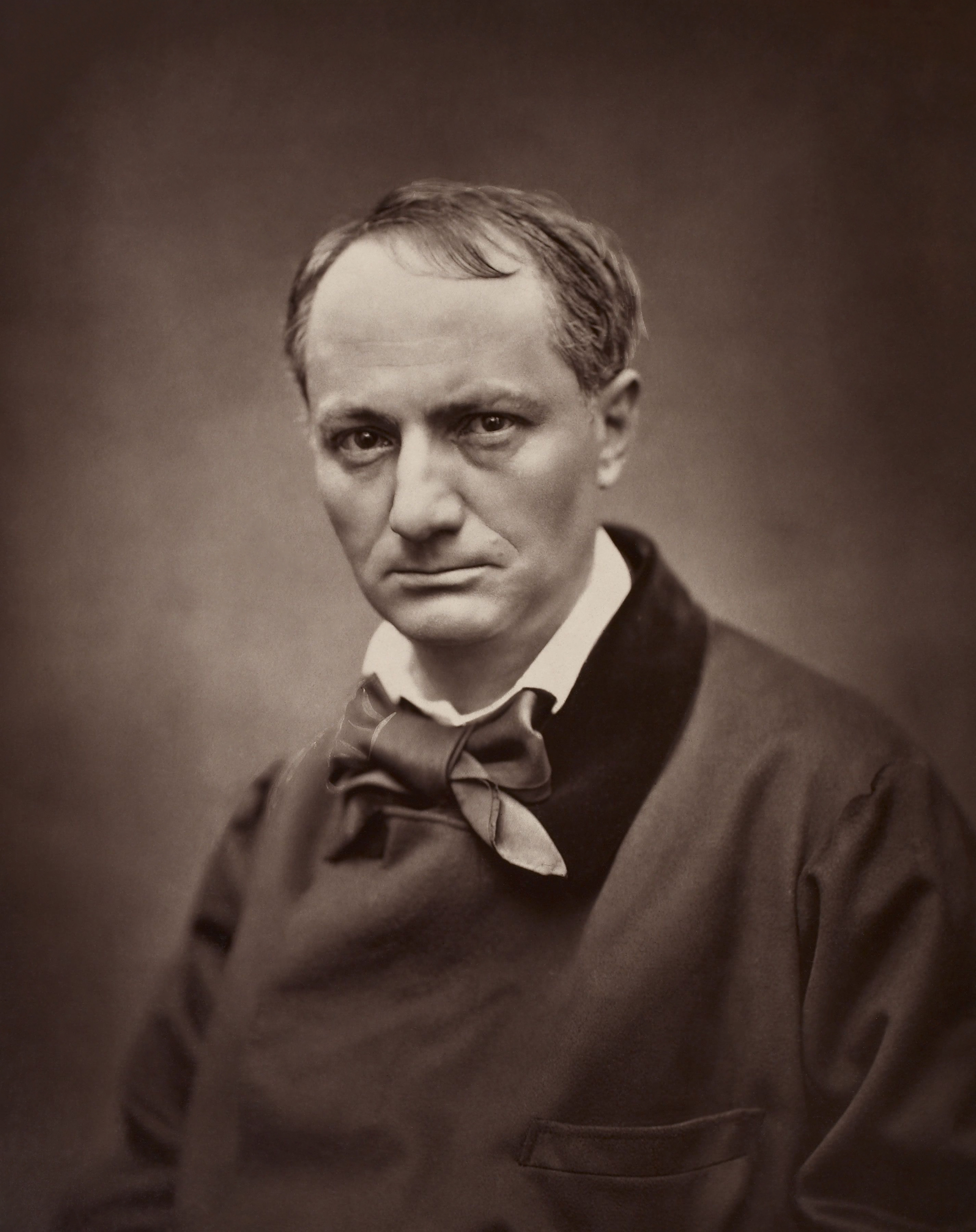
French poet Charles Baudelaire had a major impact on Xuân Diệu and Thơ thơ.

Between 1932 and 1945, Vietnamese poetry was introduced to the intellectual-led Thơ mới ("New Poetry") movement, which aimed to introduce free verse poetry to counter against perceived restrictions of poetic and emotional expression in the more traditional đường luật poems. Around this time, as Vietnam was under French colonial control, the movement was heavily influenced by the French symbolist and romanticist movements, and particularly from the works of poets such as Charles Baudelaire, Arthur Rimbaud, Paul Verlaine, and Stéphane Mallarmé. In 1937, Xuân Diệu joined the Self-Reliant Literary Group, a left-wing literary society that was the primary site of development for the New Poetry movement.

== List of poems ==
- Cảm xúc (Emotions)
- Dại khờ (Gullible)
- Nụ cười xuân (Spring smiles)
- "Vì sao" (Why/Star(s))
- Nguyên đán (New Year's Eve)
- Trăng (Moon)
- Huyền diệu (Mystical)
- Gặp gỡ (Meeting)
- Yêu (Love)
- Xa cách (Separation)
- Phải nói (Having to say)
- Tình trai (Boys love)
- Nhị hồ (Erhu)
- Đi thuyền (On a boat)
- Thơ duyên
- Thời gian (Time)
- Đây mùa thu tới (Here comes autumn)
- Ý thu (The meaning of autumn)
- Hẹn hò (Dating)
- Chàng sầu (A sad man)
- Lạc quan (Optimistic)
- Bài thơ tuổi nhỏ (Poet of childhood)
- Giới thiệu (Introduction)
- Cặp hài vạn dặm (Seven-league boots)
- Tiếng không lời (Mây lưng chừng hàng)
- Muộn màng (Late)
- Ca tụng (Adulate)
- Chiếc lá (The leaf)
- Gửi trời (To God)
- Mười chữ (Ten words)
- Bên ấy bên này (There here)
- Tiếng gió ([The] sound of wind)
- Hoa nở để mà tàn (Flowers blossoms only to decay)
- Mùa thi (Test season)
- Vô biên (Endless)
- Biệt ly êm ái (Comfortable farewell)
- Với bàn tay ấy (With those hands)
- Núi xa (Faraway mountain)
- Dối trá (Liar)
- Tương tư chiều (Evening thoughts)
- Viễn khách (One from afar)

== Bibliography ==
- Hoài, Thanh; Hoài, Chân (1942). Nguyễn, Đức Phiên (ed.). Thi Nhân Việt Nam [Poets of Vietnam] (PDF) (in Vietnamese) (1 ed.). Saigon, Vietnam.
  - Hoài, Thanh. "Một thời đại trong thi ca". In Hoài (1942). [An era in poetry]
- Lưu, Khánh Thơ, ed. (2007). Xuân Diệu - Về tác gia và tác phẩm [Xuân Diệu - About the Author and the Work] (in Vietnamese) (6th ed.). Nhà Xuất bản Giáo dục.
  - Hoàng, Nhân. "Xuân Diệu và Baudelaire". In Lưu (2007). [Xuân Diệu and Baudelaire]
