= Self-Reliant Literary Group =

Literary society in Tonkin during the 1930s

- Abbreviation: TL
- Formation: March 2, 1934; 92 years ago
- Founders: Nhất Linh, Khái Hưng, Hoàng Đạo, Thạch Lam, Tú Mỡ, Thế Lữ, Xuân Diệu
- Founded at: Hanoi, Tonkin, French Indochina
- Dissolved: 1940
- Legal status: Active organization
- Purpose: Literature, education, art, activism
- Headquarters: 80 Route du Grand Bouddha, Hanoi, Tonkin, French Indochina
- Region served: Tonkin
- Owner: Nhất Linh, Khái Hưng, Hoàng Đạo, Thế Lữ, Thạch Lam, Tú Mỡ
- Director: Nhất Linh
- Affiliations: League of Light

The Self-Reliant Literary Group (Vietnamese: Tự-Lực văn-đoàn, chữ Hán: 自力文團, French: Union Littéraire Autonome) was a literary group in Tonkin during the 1930s.

== History ==
The Tự Lực văn đoàn was an influential literary collective founded in 1932-1933 by Nhất Linh and Khái Hưng. They were one of the most significant political and literary movements in twentieth-century Vietnam and published significantly via their two journals, Phong Hóa (Mores, 1932–1936) and Ngày Nay (Today, 1936–1940, 1945) as well as their own publishing house (Đời Nay). The group used these journals and novels to articulate their social and political ideals, as well as experiment with new literary forms such as the groundbreaking Thơ mới (New Poetry Movement), new modes of reportage, and the modern autobiography. The group promoted modernization and Westernization, rejecting Confucian traditions which they deemed anachronistic. Tự Lực văn đoàn's core members included Nhất Linh, Khái Hưng, Hoàng Đạo, Thạch Lam, Xuân Diệu, Thế Lữ, Huy Cận, and Tú Mỡ.

== Literary influence ==
For the Tự Lực văn đoàn, the novel as a genre was a vehicle for political and social change. It could be used not only to reflect and question social reality, but also to envision new revolutionized futures. The group's prose was characterized by minimalist aesthetics, a sharp break away from the traditional erudite, rhetorical styles of classical prose and stilted rhyme. Their novels were not meant to be didactic, or offer cosmically balanced poetic justice. Instead, the group adopted a mix of romanticism and realism in their writing, producing a form of stylized aesthetics that set a precedent for the modern novel in Vietnam. The New Poetry lyricists were less concerned with conventional form and content and more interested in exploring their own subjectivity and individualism. Many of their literary works also engaged with feminism, for Tự Lực văn đoàn's members sought to reveal and critique the underlying social norms and practices that perpetuated women's traditional roles. However, some critics have also accused these writers’ works of being ideologically romantic and politically unrealistic, framing the writers themselves as out-of-touch bourgeois elites.

== Political beliefs ==
Similar to other leftist groups, the group subscribed to historical materialism, and saw economics as the tool to achieve transformative political and social change. However, the group was cautious of the excesses of capitalism, and also advocated for ways to mitigate the resultant inequalities. The group espoused an egalitarian vision of Vietnamese society, and sought to integrate marginalized groups such as women and the rural peasantry. The group's calls for political reforms echoed throughout their literary and journalistic publications, ranging from Phong Hóa to Ngày Nay. Its republican politics centered around a few main ideas: its support for representative democratic institutions, linguistic and cultural nationalism, belief in eventual self-determination, defense of personal freedoms, and complete rejection of the monarchy.

The group sought to achieve these republican ideals via centre-left politics, practicing a brand of moderate mainstream socialism that most closely aligned with social democracy. They synthesized classical French republican values of democracy and freedom, and moderate socialist objectives of decreasing inequality and promoting social cohesion through state participation. Although the group did not necessarily believe in overthrowing colonialism, and outrightly rejected violent revolution, they demanded that the French colonial administration live up to their republican ideals by granting the people of Tonkin certain political and legal rights. The group rejected orthodox Marxist ideas of passivity and economic determinism, instead championing for a third way between laissez-faire capitalism and Soviet communism via a strong socialist state that could tame the excesses of capitalism.

The group also had a strong feminist agenda and advocated for women's emancipation. Their interest in the plight of oppressed women extended across classes, encompassing not merely urban intellectuals but also brothel madams and rural peasant women. Beyond proposing changes to women's fashion, the Tự Lực văn đoàn also encouraged women to write for their papers, and even had a column dedicated to discussing women's issues.

== Đời Nay Publishing House ==
Đời Nay Publishing House was founded by the Tự Lực Văn Đoàn in 1933 to address the poor production quality of books and the exploitation of writers by publishers. The house published Phong Hóa and other serialized novels from 1933 until its eventual demise in 1946. The Tự Lực Văn Đoàn sought to use publishing as a vehicle to advance their modernist reform projects. The group wanted to transform Vietnamese readers’ reading habits and prove that the Vietnamese were capable of producing books similar to those of the great publishing houses in Europe and America. Their early books were known for quality printing and use of high-end paper. Some of their books were so well-designed that some were even displayed at Hanoi's 1935 Salon in the Indochinese Fine Arts University.

In 1936, the group shifted to printing paperbacks in line with increasing populist sentiments following the rise of the Popular Front government in France. The first paperback series introduced were Green Books, which aimed to democratize literature by allowing families of all incomes to build their own family library. The first Green Book published was Nhất Linh’s Đoạn Tuyệt (A Severance of Ties). The book was a huge commercial success and sold over 1,000 copies in three days. In 1937, they announced another book series, “Nắng Mới” (New Sun), which was targeted at those with little schooling or who did not know French. Thus, Đời Nay aimed to reach the most intellectually neglected and underprivileged groups, particularly women.

However, the onset of World War II led to significant financial strain on the Tự Lực Văn Đoàn, and the group decided to dismantle Đời Nay publishing house in 1945. By the August Revolution, even the publishing house ceased to operate.

== Phong Hóa ==
Phong Hóa was a dynamic and versatile journal that covered a wide variety of topics ranging from current affairs to literature to humor to fashion advice. Phong Hóa's founder, Nhất Linh, was influenced by the literary and journalistic publishing world of the metropole and modeled Phong Hóa after journals such as Le Canard Enchaîné and Le Rire. The magazine positioned itself vis-a-vis its Southern counterpart Nam Phong, attacking it for its pedantic and didactic style and neo-traditionalist views which the Tự Lực Văn Đoàn outdated and inappropriate for Vietnam.

Instead, Phong Hóa tried to distinguish itself from its journalistic predecessors in form, tone, ideology, and content. The magazine quickly became known for its use of satire to discuss social and political events. The magazine represented the first satirical newspaper of its kind in Vietnam and revolutionized the use of humor in magazines and newspapers. Prior to Phong Hóa, humor was compartmentalized as separate joke columns distinct from main articles, where its levity was seen as opposed to the gravity of serious intellectual discussions. Phong Hóa was so successful that it not only spawned further satirical papers, it also inspired efforts by other serious journals to include humor columns of their own.

A key character that emerged from Phong Hóa was that of Lý Toét. Lý Toét is often depicted as a bumbling country bumpkin encountering manifestations of "modernity" in rapidly evolving Vietnam. These include new technologies, fashion, spaces, and behaviours characteristic of urban cities like Saigon and Hanoi. Although Lý Toét aspires to be civilized and act in “modern” ways, he always fails. Lý Toét's character proved widely popular, and assumed a life of its own outside of Phong Hóa.

Beyond entertainment, Phong Hóa also hoped to serve as a public whistleblower by revealing the incompetencies and corruption of the Tonkinese Chamber of Representatives. Through their coverage of the chamber, they hoped to improve democratic institutions and processes by holding their officials accountable. They also hoped to construct a civil society via their writing by their readers with the right values and habits. However, the group may have gone to far in its attacks on the mandarinate, for in May 1935 the paper was suddenly suspended for 3 months after French censors withdrew the paper's authorization.

== Ngày Nay ==
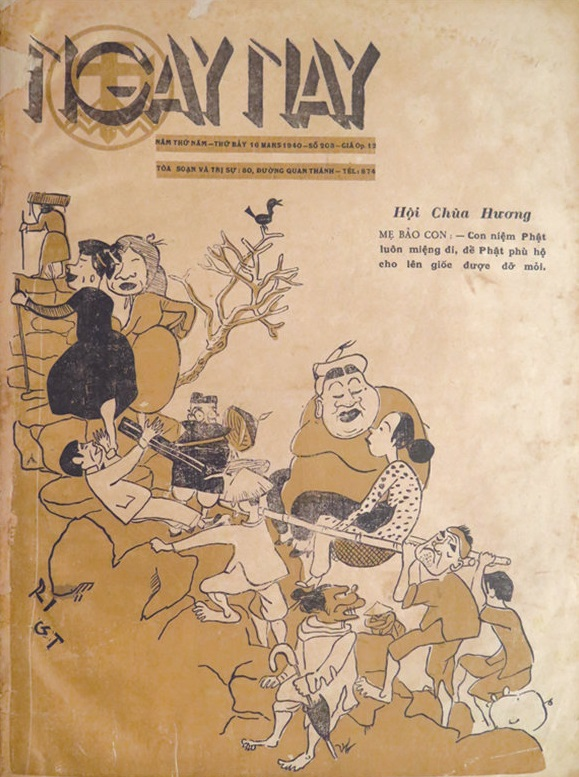
A political cartoon published in Ngày Nay that was critical of the Nguyễn dynasty administration during the 1930's.

Following the success of Phong Hóa, the Tự Lực Văn Đoàn decided to launch another newspaper in January 1935, entitled Ngày Nay (These Days). Ngày Nay had a more explicit political bent than Phong Hóa, and featured biting social commentary. Ngày Nay was also one of the earliest forums for photojournalism and featured several photographs. However, the journal proved expensive and time-consuming to upkeep, and the paper closed after only 13 issues.

After Phong Hóa's three-month closure by French censors, the Tự Lực Văn Đoàn decided to close Phong Hóa permanently and reinstated Ngày Nay on July 12, 1936. The revived Ngày Nay combined Phong Hóa's trademark humor and literature with social commentary from its earlier incarnation. This new version of the paper signalled Tự Lực Văn Đoàn's emboldened activism, as the Tự Lực Văn Đoàn's discourse became increasingly political, especially during the French Popular Front period and the resultant Indochinese Congress and Indochinese Democratic Front movements. During this time, the Tự Lực Văn Đoàn began interacting with external political parties, including the Indochinese Communist Party. Ngày Nay also functioned as the primary information organ for the League of Light, the public housing philanthropic organization started by Nhat Linh.

== League of Light ==
The flag of the League of Light

The League of Light [Hội Ánh Sáng or Đoàn Ánh Sáng] was a public housing philanthropic organization founded by the Tự Lực văn đoàn to address unsanitary housing conditions in urban and rural areas. The League was officially sanctioned by the colonial government in October 1937, although League members had begun organizing and mobilizing for support a year prior. The League's president, Nhất Linh, and its principal architects all trained at the Indochinese Fine Arts University, and were likely influenced by European discourses of environmental determinism and urban reform.

The League aimed to construct sanitary and affordable housing in populous areas, as well as dig wells, build roads, manage sewage, and establish modern hamlets in villages. League houses would also include common spaces such as communal laundry areas and wells, reading rooms, playgrounds, and first aid clinics. Beyond material intervention, the League also aimed to intervene morally by encouraging and teaching its inhabitants to upkeep the houses. This education was targeted at women, whom the League held responsible for bettering the family household and applying home economic principles.

Apart from improving living conditions for impoverished Vietnamese, League leaders also wanted to carve out a pluralistic public space for collective civic action. The League's organization and community practices reflected its spirit of egalitarianism and inclusion. For instance, League members relinquished all pronouns that reflected hierarchical or professional status. In line with the Tự Lực văn đoàn's feminist agenda, League members also made the recruitment of female members a high priority.

Like the Đời Nay Publishing House, League activities eventually came to a halt around 1939 due to the onset of World War II and Nhất Linh’s abandonment of writing and social reform for political activism. Although the League was only active for a few brief years, it represented an important early attempt to establish civil society groups in Vietnam and provided critical social services that the colonial state failed to provide.

== Members ==
- Nhất Linh
- Khái Hưng
- Hoàng Đạo
- Thế Lữ
- Thạch Lam
- Tú Mỡ
- Huy Cận
- Trọng Lang
- Đoàn Phú Tứ
- Đỗ Đức Thu
- Trần Tiêu
- Thanh Tịnh
- Phạm Cao Củng
- Nguyễn Khắc Hiếu
- Tô Hoài
- Nguyên Hồng
- Đinh Hùng
- Nguyễn Công Hoan
- Vi Huyền Đắc
- Nguyễn Tường Bách
- Nguyễn Gia Trí
- Tô Ngọc Vân
- Nguyễn Cát Tường
- Lê Phổ
- Lê Thị Lựu
- Đái Đức Tuấn
- Nguyễn Nhược Pháp
- Phạm Hầu
- Nguyễn Cát Tường

== Contributing editors ==
- Lê Văn Đệ
- Lê Minh Đức
- Vi Kim Ngọc
- Nguyễn Thị Nội
- Nguyễn Thị Hậu
- Nguyễn Hòa Vân
- Huguette Tholance
- Nguyễn Thị Vân
- Vũ Thị Hiền
- Hồ Thị Môn Chi

== See also ==
- Vietnamese PEN Club
