= Hoàng Đạo =

Vietnamese journalist and politician

Nguyễn Tường Long Hoàng Đạo
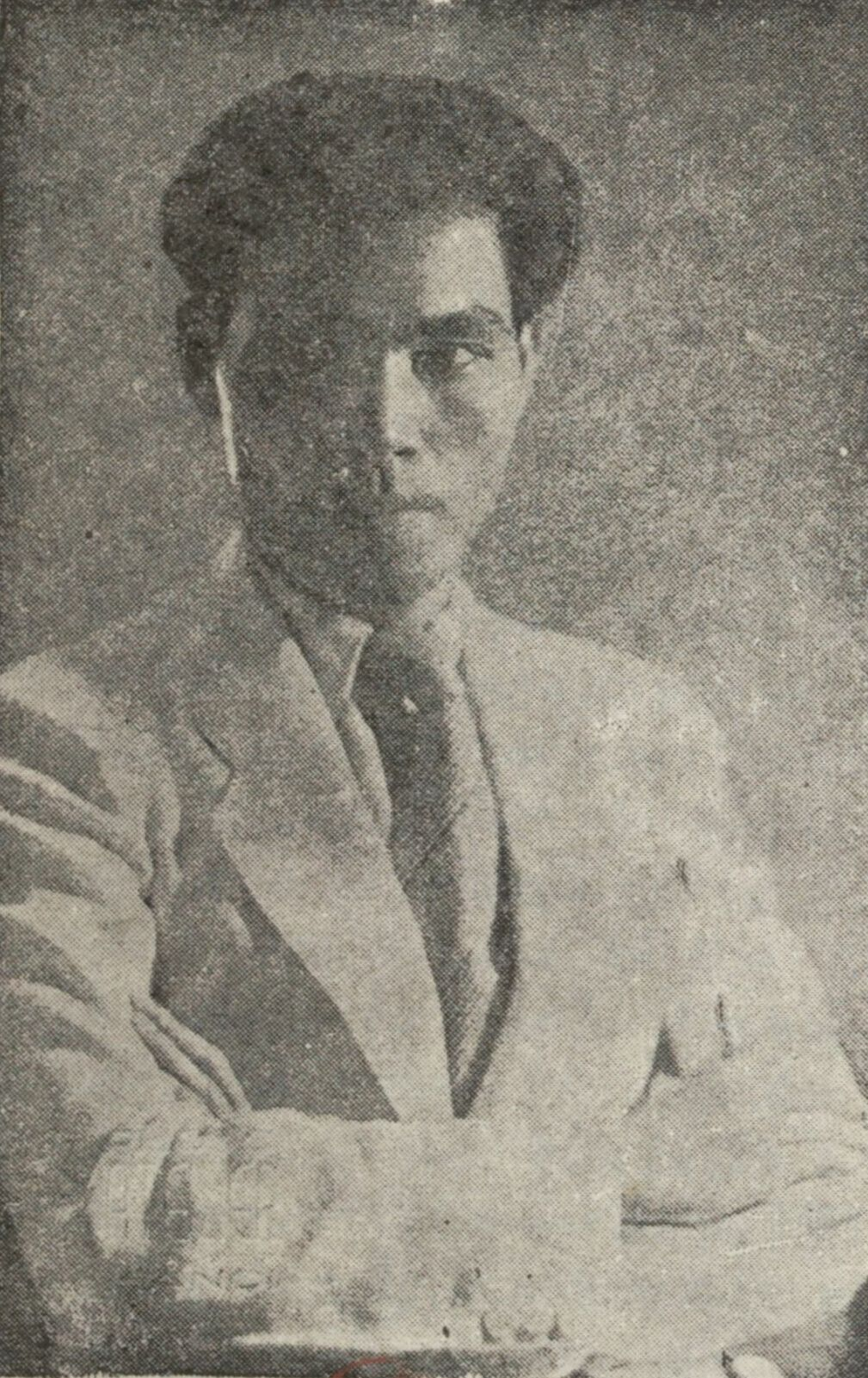

2nd Minister of National Economy
- In office 1 January 1946 – 2 March 1946
- Preceded by: Nguyễn Mạnh Hà
- Succeeded by: Chu Bá Phượng

Personal details
- Born: 1907 Cẩm Giàng district, Hải Dương, Tonkin, French Indochina
- Died: 1948 (aged 40–41) Shilong, Dongguan, Guangdong, Republic of China
- Cause of death: Heart attack
- Party: Đại Việt Dân chính Đảng

Hoàng Đạo (1907–1948) is a pen name for Nguyễn Tường Long, an influential essayist and novelist during the inter-war years in Vietnam. He was an important member of the collective Self-Reliant Literary Group (Tự lực Văn đoàn) and was Nhất Linh's brother. He served as the group's unofficial chief theoretician and contributed significantly to its political writings, which was published in journals Phong Hóa and Ngày Nay. Most of his essays were collected and published in the late 1930s. He also wrote Tự Lực văn đoàn's ten-point manifesto.

At the start of World War II, Hoàng Đạo started traveling to and from China to organize an anti-colonial group, Đại Việt Dân chính Đảng, together with other members of the Tự Lực văn đoàn. Hoàng Đạo and fellow member Khái Hưng were arrested by the French for their anti-colonial activities and were imprisoned for two years. In 1948, Hoàng Đạo died of a heart attack while traveling on a train in China.

== Early years ==
Hoàng Đạo, born Nguyễn Tường Long, initially trained in law and earned a degree from the Indochina Law School in 1927. After graduating, he worked at the Hanoi Treasury and pursued further studies, earning a French baccalaureate degree two years later. He began his career working as a civil servant for the French colonial government, where his post as a tribunal clerk enabled him to travel throughout Eastern Indochina. In response to an uprising at Yen Bai in 1932, the French government reassigned Vietnamese civil servants to different outposts to prevent them from collaborating with locals to overthrow the colonial government. Hoàng Đạo was reassigned from Saigon to Hanoi, where his brother Nhất Linh was. Nhất Linh was then spearheading the literary collective Tự Lực văn đoàn which Hoàng Đạo soon became an integral member of.

== Political Beliefs ==
Hoàng Đạo, was highly influenced by Enlightenment ideas, which prioritized the universal rational citizen over Confucian social order. He was highly critical of Confucianism and Vietnamese traditions, seeing the past as a time for darkness. Instead, he believed that Vietnam had to follow the path of Westernization in order to modernize and become a self-sufficient and sovereign nation. To Hoàng Đạo, Eastern and Western cultures were inherently incompatible, which he compared to “streams running down a mountain, only a stream runs to the East, and the other to the West, and they cannot join and become one."

In his essay collection Muddy, Standing Water, Hoàng Đạo criticized the French colonial government's policies as well as native collaborators, charging the French's hypocrisy in exploiting Indochina’s natural resources and labor for economic profit while failing to spread ideas of Enlightenment and civilization. Hoàng Đạo advocated for an Enlightenment reform program that could transform peasants into citizens. Hoàng Đạo's imagined nation did not refer to Indochina, but to Annam specifically. Like Communist leader Ho Chi Minh and neo-traditionalist Pham Quynh, Hoàng Đạo pushed for an Vietnamese cultural nationalism which would feature an ethnically and linguistically homogenous Vietnam comprising Tonkin, Annam, and Cochinchina, excluding Laos and Cambodia. His brand of Vietnamese ethnic nationalism based on co-sanguinity, language and soil had echoes in German Romanticism.

Hoàng Đạo believed strongly in the importance of education in instilling ideas of rational will and agency to compel moral action. He also believed specifically that the novel as a genre was an important conduit for this process.
