= Đường luật =

Vietnamese variant of Chinese Tang poetry

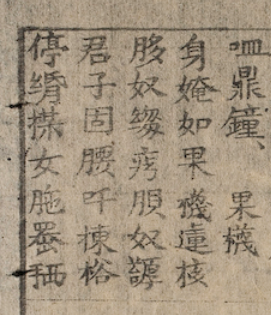
Quả Mít (Jackfruit), a thất ngôn tứ tuyệt poem by Hồ Xuân Hương

Đường luật (chữ Hán: 唐律; lit. 'regulated Tang'), or luật Đường, is the Vietnamese variant of Chinese Tang poetry. Characterized by its complicated, often times strict patterns of rhyme, intonation, contrast, and structure, Đường luật is also referred to as thơ cận thể (lit. 'modern-style poetry') to differentiate from classical Tang-style poems which do not strictly adhere to such rules.

In Vietnam, the original Tang poems from China are distinguished from their Vietnamese counterparts (thơ Đường luật), by the names "thơ Đường" (chữ Hán: 書唐, lit. 'Tang poetry') and "Đường thi" (chữ Hán: 唐詩, lit. 'Tang verse'), both of which are also used to refer to Tang poetry as a whole.

Thất ngôn bát cú (chữ Hán: 七言八句) is regarded as the standard form of Đường luật, although other variations include thất ngôn tứ tuyệt (a seven-syllable quatrain), ngũ ngôn tứ tuyệt (a five-syllable quatrain) and ngũ ngôn bát cú (a five-syllable octave).

== Form ==
The standard form of đường luật, known as a thất ngôn bát cú poem, consists of eight lines with seven syllables each. In total, there are 56 syllables. A poem is divided into 4 parts: the 'Đề', 'Thực', (Note: Or the 'Trạng') 'Luận', and 'Kết'.

The 'Đề' is the introductory section, comprising the first two lines, in which the author outlines and introduces key ideas and events. The second line is referred to as the 'thừa đề' and serves as a transition line towards the 'Thực'. The 'Thực', which includes the second pair of lines (namely the third and fourth), aims to develop the author's ideas (or setting of choice) in depth. It is followed by the 'Luận' (the fifth and sixth lines), which expands and builds upon the ideas found in the 'Thực' and often involves a deeper dive into the author's written emotions. The 'Kết' (lit. 'end'), as its name suggests, acts as the conclusion; summarizing the poems' ideas and connecting back to the first line. The seventh and eighth lines (making up the 'Kết') are known as the 'thúc / chuyển' and the 'hợp', respectively.

Several approaches have been made to the structure of a đường luật poem. The '2-4-2' approach, for instance, states there is greater emphasis on time in the first and last pair of lines (1, 2, 7, 8), whereas the other four lines emphasize the depiction of scenery from the author's perspective. Other approaches, such as the "Cảnh-Tình" (lit. 'scene-emotion') approach by Jin Shengtan, argue that the first four lines focus more on scenery, while the last four focus on emotion (presumably the author's).

== Meter ==
=== Rhyme ===
In a standard đường luật poem, the ending syllable of lines 1, 2, 4, 6, and 8 must rhyme. In quatrain variations of đường luật, this instead applies to lines 1, 2, 4. "Perfect rhymes" (vần chính) occur when two ending syllables have the same exact rime, whereas instances of two ending syllables partially rhyming are known as "imperfect rhymes" (vần thông).

For example, in the poem Qua đèo Ngang by Bà Huyện Thanh Quan:

Bước tới đèo Ngang, bóng xế tà,
Cỏ cây chen đá, lá chen hoa. (Note: Translation: Passing by the Ngang Pass, under the shadows of the late afternoon, Trees crowd themselves against rocks, leaves against flowers.)

The two ending syllables, with the sounds: 'a' and 'oa', only partially rhyme. Therefore, they are imperfect rhymes.

=== Intonation (Luật bằng trắc) ===
In đường luật, tonal rules are built upon two sets of tones, namely "bằng" / even tones (ngang ◌ and huyền ◌̀) and "trắc" / uneven tones (sắc ◌́, hỏi ◌̉, ngã ◌̃, and nặng ़), and apply to the second, fourth, sixth, and seventh syllable of each line. Such syllables may only use either an 'even' or 'uneven' tone, depending on which tonal rules apply. Moreover, in each line the second and sixth syllables must be part of the same set of tones; the fourth syllable must always belong to the opposite set. (Note: For instance, if the second and sixth syllables happen to belong to the even set of tones, the fourth letter/syllable must conversely belong to the uneven set of tones.)

Đường luật poems follow two separate rules: luật bằng (lit. 'even (tone) rule') and luật trắc (lit. 'uneven (tone) rule'). They are determined by the set (of tones) that the second syllable of the first line belongs to. (Note: For instance, if the second syllable of the first line includes a 'bằng (even)' tone, the poem is to follow ' luật bằng '.)

==== In accordance with luật bằng ====
===== Thất ngôn tứ tuyệt =====
Line	Syllable							Example: Mời trầu, by Hồ Xuân Hương
Line	1	2	3	4	5	6	7	Example: Mời trầu, by Hồ Xuân Hương
1		B		T		B	B	Quả cau nho nhỏ miếng trầu hôi
2		T		B		T	B	Này của Xuân Hương mới quệt rồi
3		T		B		T	T	Có phải duyên nhau thì thắm lại
4		B		T		B	B	Đừng xanh như lá, bạc như vôi

===== Thất ngôn bát cú =====
Line	Syllable							Example: Thương vợ, by Trần Tế Xương
Line	1	2	3	4	5	6	7	Example: Thương vợ, by Trần Tế Xương
1		B		T		B	B	Quanh năm buôn bán ở non sông
2		T		B		T	B	Nuôi đủ năm con với một chồng
3		T		B		T	T	Lặn lội thân cò khi quãng vắng
4		B		T		B	B	Eo sèo mặt nước buổi đò đông.
5		B		T		B	T	Một duyên hai nợ âu đành phận
6		T		B		T	B	Năm nắng mười mưa dám quản công.
7		T		B		T	T	Cha mẹ thói đời ăn ở bạc!
8		B		T		B	B	Có chồng hờ hững cũng như không!

==== In accordance with luật trắc ====
===== Thất ngôn tứ tuyệt =====
Line	Syllable				Mooring by Maple Bridge at Night by Zhang Ji (Sino-Vietnamese transliteration)
1	T	B	T	B	Nguyệt lạc ô đề sương mãn thiên
2	B	T	B	B	Giang phong ngư hỏa đối sầu miên
3	B	T	B	T	Cô Tô thành ngoại Hàn San tự
4	T	B	T	B	Dạ bán chung thanh đáo khách thuyền

===== Thất ngôn bát cú =====
Line	Syllable				Ví dụ: Nhớ bạn phương trời by Trần Tế Xương
1	T	B	T	B	Ta nhớ người xa cách núi sông
2	B	T	B	B	Người xa, xa lắm nhớ ta không
3	B	T	B	T	Sao đang vui vẻ ra buồn bã!
4	T	B	T	B	Vừa mới quen nhau đã lạ lùng
5	T	B	T	T	Lúc nhớ, nhớ cùng trong mộng tưởng
6	B	T	B	B	Khi riêng, riêng cả đến tình chung
7	B	T	B	T	Tương tư lọ phải là mưa gió,
8	T	B	T	B	Một ngọn đèn xanh trống điểm thùng

=== Niêm ===
Niêm refers to structural connections between the tonal rules (luật) of lines, particularly pairs of lines. For a pair of lines in a đường luật poem to 'link/niêm' with each other, the second syllable of the two lines must belong to the same set of tones (as listed above). (Note: For example, if the second syllable of one line has an even ("bằng") tone, its corresponding line must also use an even tone on its second syllable.)

The linking/niêm rules in a thất ngôn bát cú poem are as follows: (Note: The layout of a thất ngôn bát cú poem following luật bằng has been used for reference.)

Line	Syllable							Legend
Line	1	2	3	4	5	6	7	Line 1 links with Line 8 Line 2 links with Line 3 Line 4 links with Line 5 Line 6 links with Line 7
1		B		T		B	B	Line 1 links with Line 8 Line 2 links with Line 3 Line 4 links with Line 5 Line 6 links with Line 7
2		T		B		T	B	Line 1 links with Line 8 Line 2 links with Line 3 Line 4 links with Line 5 Line 6 links with Line 7
3		T		B		T	T	Line 1 links with Line 8 Line 2 links with Line 3 Line 4 links with Line 5 Line 6 links with Line 7
4		B		T		B	B	Line 1 links with Line 8 Line 2 links with Line 3 Line 4 links with Line 5 Line 6 links with Line 7
5		B		T		B	T	Line 1 links with Line 8 Line 2 links with Line 3 Line 4 links with Line 5 Line 6 links with Line 7
6		T		B		T	B	Line 1 links with Line 8 Line 2 links with Line 3 Line 4 links with Line 5 Line 6 links with Line 7
7		T		B		T	T	Line 1 links with Line 8 Line 2 links with Line 3 Line 4 links with Line 5 Line 6 links with Line 7
8		B		T		B	B	Line 1 links with Line 8 Line 2 links with Line 3 Line 4 links with Line 5 Line 6 links with Line 7

== Variations ==
=== Thất ngôn bát cú ===
Consists of eight lines, with seven syllables each (a seven-syllable octave). It is regarded as the standard variation of Đường luật.
