= Baiye (disambiguation) =

Baiye is one of tofu.

Baiye may also refer to:

- Baiye (白鵺), one of supernatural beings in Chinese folklore
- Brandon Baiye (born 2000), Belgian professional footballer
- Bạch Diệp (白葉, pinyin: bǎiyè; 1929–2013), North Vietnam's film director
