= La Hối =

Vietnamese musician

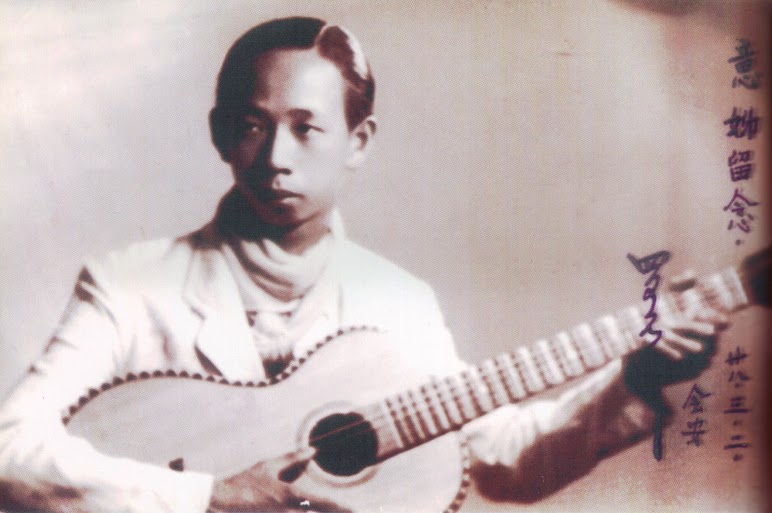

Background information
- Born: La Doãn Chánh; 1920; Hội An, French Indochina
- Died: 2 April 1945 (aged 24–25) Da Nang, Empire of Vietnam
- Years active: 1934–1945

La Doãn Chánh
- Traditional Chinese: 羅允正
- Simplified Chinese: 罗允正
Transcriptions

La Hối
- Traditional Chinese: 羅開
- Simplified Chinese: 罗开
Transcriptions

La Doãn Chánh (simplified Chinese: 罗允正; traditional Chinese: 羅允正; 1920 – 2 April 1945), known by his stage name La Hối (simplified Chinese: 罗开; traditional Chinese: 羅開), was a Vietnamese Hoa musician and resistance leader active during the Japanese invasion of French Indochina.

== Biography ==
Born in 1920 to a Hakka family with origins in Dongguan, Guangdong, China, La Hối started writing songs at the age of 14. Between 1936 and 1938, he studied in Saigon and began to embrace Western musical conventions.

In 1939, La Hối returned to his hometown of Hội An, where, alongside Vương Gia Khương, he founded the Faifoo Philharmonic Society. From this period until his passing, he authored songs either by himself or in collaboration with other musicians, such as Gấm vàng (Golden Brocade) with Dương Minh Ninh, Nắng chiều (Sun in the Afternoon) with Lê Trọng Nguyễn and Chiều tưởng nhớ (Afternoon of Mourning) with Lan Đài. A year later, amidst the Japanese invasion of French Indochina, he became acquainted with Chinese revolutionaries in Guangxi and eventually made the Philharmonic Society an anti-Japanese resistance group.

1944 was when La Hối composed his last and most popular song, Xuân và tuổi trẻ (Spring and Youth, Chinese: 青年與春天). However, fate conspired against him when the Kempeitai discovered his role in the Hội An Hoa community's resistance efforts. After an unsuccessful escape to Laos, he was captured and executed on the foot of a mountain outside Da Nang on 2 April, aged 25 – nine of his comrades also met an identical fate.

== Legacy ==
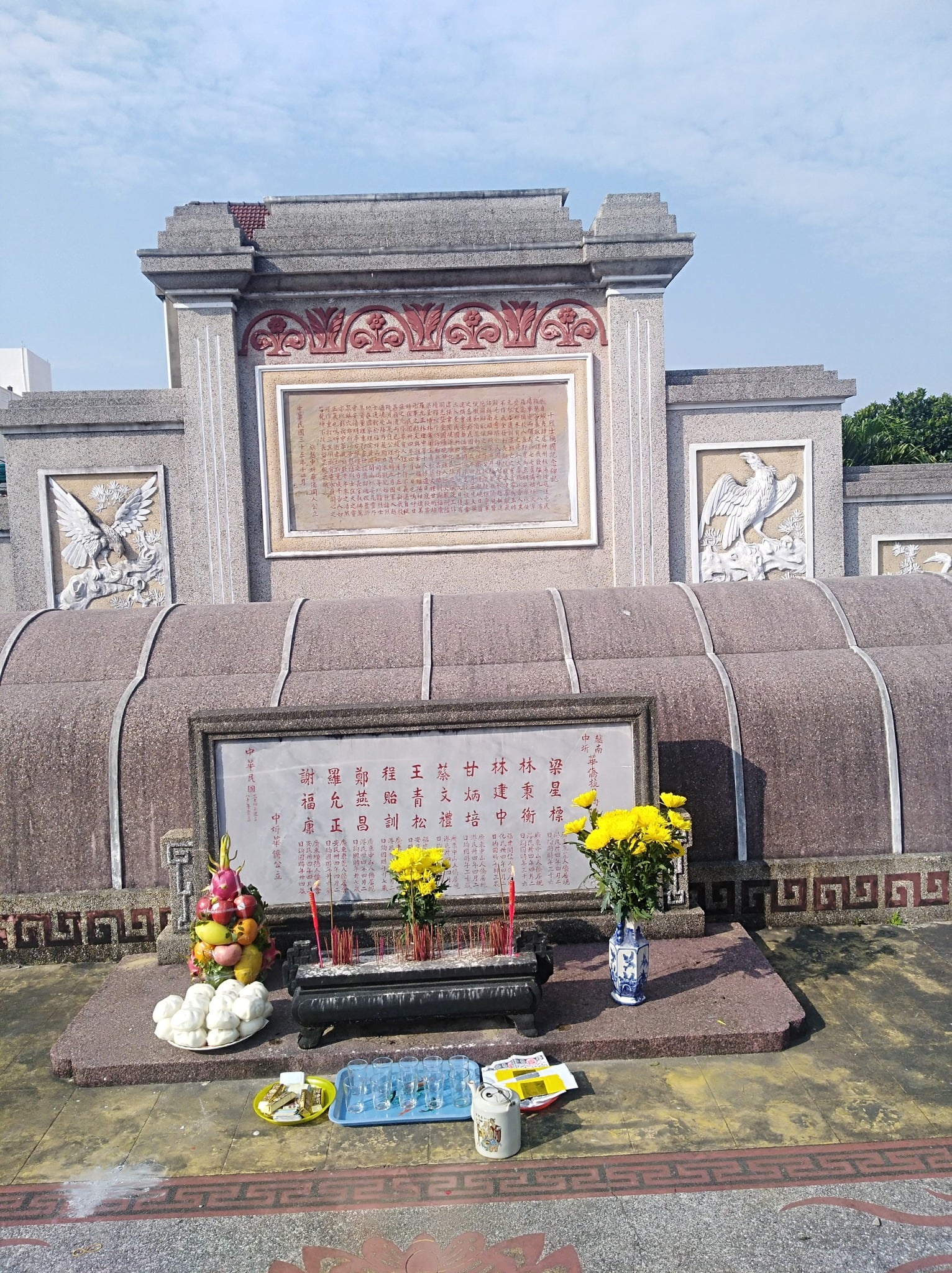
The memorial. La Hối's name appears second from left on the lower plaque.

Out of La Hối's estimated 20 self-made works, only Xuân và tuổi trẻ, as well as Xuân sắc quê hương (The Colours of Spring), remains. In his memory, renowned poet Thế Lữ wrote the lyrics to Xuân và tuổi trẻ when he visited Hội An in 1946.

Many of his descendants and relatives also became musicians, most notably La Gia Thắng (or La Xuân, 1919–1966) and pianist La Gia Quảng (or La Châu Quảng, 1926–2014).

A memorial in Hội An is dedicated to La Hối and his comrades.
