= Thế Lữ =

Vietnamese poet and author

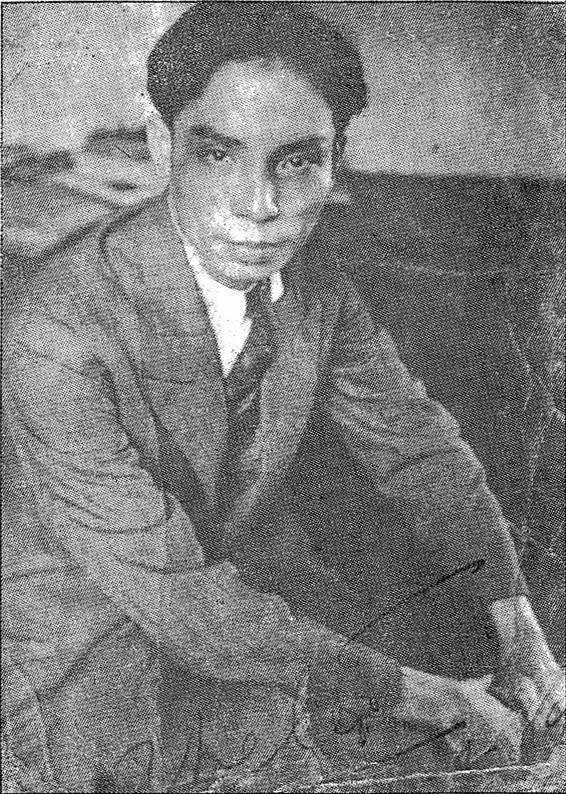
- Born: June 10, 1907; Hanoi, French Indochina
- Died: June 3, 1989 (aged 81); Ho Chi Minh City, Vietnam
- Movement: Thơ mới
- Spouses: Nguyễn Thị Khương (m. 1934–1954); Phạm Thị Nghĩa (m. 1938–1989)

Thế Lữ (June 10, 1907 – June 3, 1989; born Nguyễn Đình Lễ or Nguyễn Thứ Lễ) was a Vietnamese poet and author. He became known as one of the pioneers of the Thơ Mới Movement with several critically acclaimed and popular poems. He was a founder of Tự Lực Văn Đoàn and worked as a journalist, critic and editor for the newspapers Phong Hóa and Ngày Nay.

After 1937 Thế Lữ changed his interest to drama. He joined Viet Minh's side during the First Indochina War. After the war he continued drama activities and is credited for professionalizing the Vietnamese drama scene. He was awarded People's artist in 1984 and Ho Chi Minh Prize for culture in 2000.

== Early life ==
Thế Lữ was born in Hanoi. His original name was Nguyễn Đình Lễ, later changed to Nguyễn Thứ Lễ because he was the second son (thứ means 'latter'). When he was 10, his elder brother died after which, his name reverted to Nguyễn Đình Lễ. Later on, he changed his name again to Nguyễn Thứ Lễ.

Thế Lữ is wordplay on his birth name Thứ Lễ. Thế Lữ, which means 'wanderer of life'.

Sometimes he used the nickname Lê Ta, created from his name: Lễ -> Lê ~ -> Lê Ngã -> Lê Ta.

As a Christian, his mother was not endorsed by his father's family. When he was a few months old, his father brought him to Lạng Sơn and they lived together with his grandmother and stepmother (his father's legitimate wife). He lived away from his mother and met her only a few times each year, which is the reason why motherly love became one of his fixations. His life in the mountainous Lạng Sơn served as source material for some of his novels.

Thế Lữ studied chữ Nho at 8 and chữ Quốc ngữ at 10.

In 1924 he started high school and married his first wife Nguyễn Thị Khương. They had 4 children. During this time he became a nationalist, then joined Vietnam Revolutionary Youth League.

In 1929 he attended Indochina College of Art in Hanoi, but left after one year due to disappointment with a professor and the school's management. During this time he organized a salon littéraire and wrote short stories. His pen name was 'Đào Thị Tô written together with Thế Lữ'. The success of these publications partly encouraged him to quit art school. From fine art, he approached literature.

In 1934 he joined fellow writers in the foundation of Tự Lực Văn Đoàn, a left-wing literary association.

In 1935 he issued the poetry collection "Mấy Vần Thơ" (Some verses).

Even though drama was one of his favorites, in 1937 Thế Lữ exclusively started to focus on drama as both actor and director. At the end of 1938, he married actress Song Kim.

Thế Lữ claimed to live only for arts and literature, hence declined to join Nguyễn Tường Tam, a Tự Lực Văn Đoàn fellow, when the latter was the head of Việt Nam Quốc Dân Đảng. However, after the August Revolution, he became a supporter of Ho Chi Minh and refused to meet Nguyễn Tường Tam.

From the 1960s Thế Lữ stopped acting and directing (even though he still worked as an organizer), to translate foreign dramas, and consulted and encouraged new actors and directors.

He retired in 1977, then moved to Ho Chi Minh City to live with his first wife and children in 1979. He died of old age there on June 3, 1989.

== Works ==
=== Poetry ===
Thế Lữ published more than 50 poems, mostly before 1945. His earlier poems are considered iconic poems of the Thơ mới movement.

==== Theme ====
Thế Lữ was the first escapism artist in Vietnam. His poems reveal his love of beauty in sound and scenery, and contains many references to immortal realms, animals, etc.

Love is another favorite of his, where his writing is usually platonic and dreamy rather than passionate and free-minded.

==== Innovation ====
Thế Lữ was credited as a major innovator in Vietnamese poetry. Due to his rationality, the unit in Thế Lữ poetry is not a single verse but a piece of poetry structured like French grammar. Compared to old poetry, which is often condensed, his poetry often emphasizes redundancy and expresses logic. For this reason, he often used "bridging", commonly found in French poetry that binds the verses into a circuit. His style is not refined, and was improved by later poets.

=== Literature ===
Thế Lữ also wrote about 40 stories, most of them short stories themed on horror, mystery and romance in mountainous settings. His writing is influenced by the Western rationalists, especially Edgar Allan Poe. In many of his stories he built up horror and a mysterious setting first, then scientifically explained it. This is his and Tự Lực Văn Đoàn's perspective: to uphold science and anti-superstitions. His more mystery oriented works featured a recurring detective named Lê Phong.

=== Drama ===
He was both an actor and a director. He acted in 26 roles and directed or co-directed about 50 plays. He wrote about 20 plays, usually because the revolution or his colleges asked him to. In an interview in 1962, he referred to himself as only an actor and director.

Thế Lữ required actors to act realistically to convince the audience. Furthermore, his actors must speak clearly and coherently, so that they can express the meaning of each word.

=== Music ===
In 1946, Thế Lữ wrote the lyrics to "Xuân và tuổi trẻ" in memory of its composer La Hối, who was executed by the Japanese the previous year.
