= Tản Đà =

Vietnamese poet

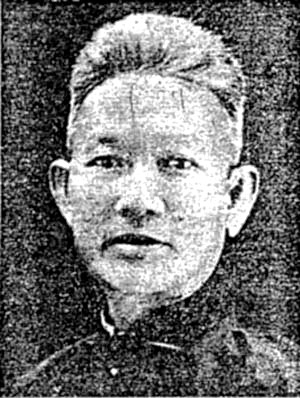
- Born: Nguyễn Khắc Hiếu; 19 May 1889 Sơn Tây province, Tonkin, French Indochina
- Died: 7 June 1939 (aged 50) Hà Đông province, Tonkin, French Indochina
- Occupation: Poet, novellist, dramatist, literary translator, journalist
- Literary movement: Thơ mới (New Poetry)
- Spouse: Nguyễn Thị Tùng (m. 1915)
- Children: 7

Nguyễn Khắc Hiếu (阮克孝), pen name Tản Đà (chữ Hán: 傘沱, 19 May 1889 – 7 June 1939) was a Vietnamese poet. His pen name is a combination of Tản from Tản Viên Mountain and Đà from Đà River

He used both traditional Sino-Vietnamese forms and European influences and was a transitional figure between the turn of the 1890s such as Tú Xương and Nguyễn Khuyến and the "New Poetry" movement of the 1930s.

Late in his life he published a literary magazine in Hanoi, An Nam Tạp Chí (Annam Magazine), but when this got into financial difficulty, he readily accepted an invitation to come South and write for the new Đông Pháp Thời Báo (Indochina Times) in Saigon.

Although popular with the newspaper-buying public, his poetry was criticised by the young poets of the Hanoi-based Thơ mới "New Poetry" movement influenced by French poets such as Baudelaire.
