= Hồ Xuân Hương =

Vietnamese poet

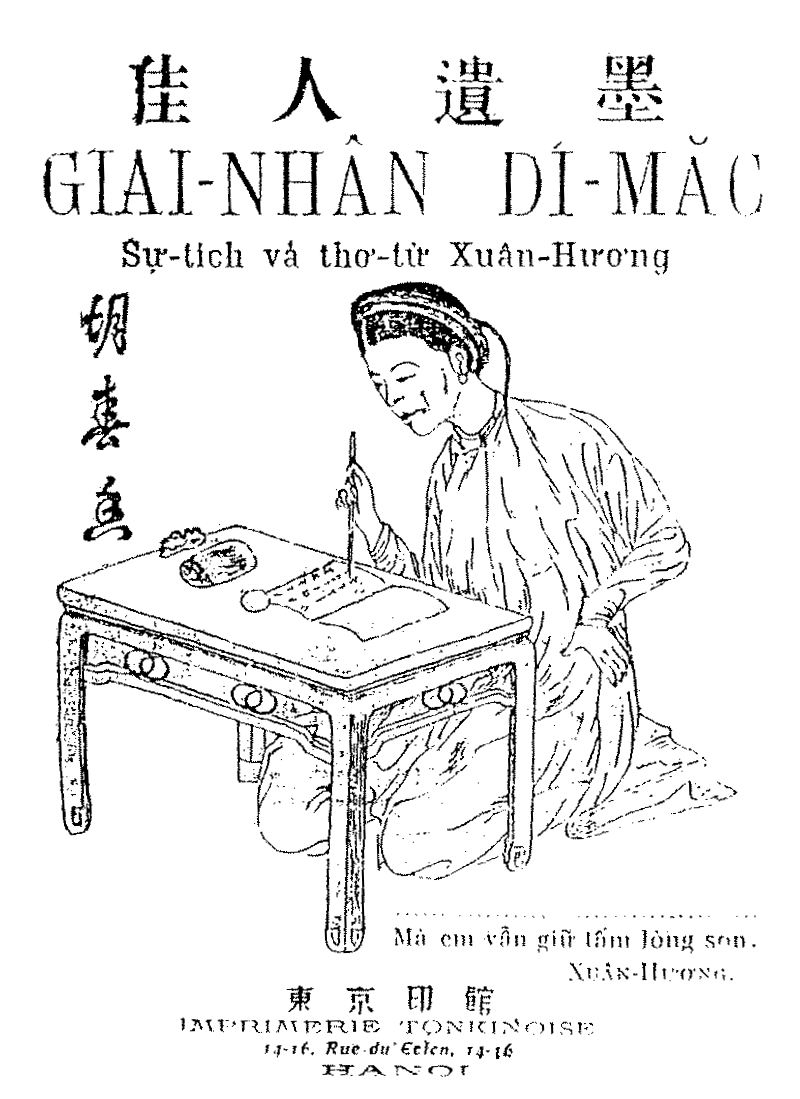
- Portrait of poetess Hồ Xuân Hương on the cover of the book Giai nhân dị mặc by scholar Nguyễn Hữu Tiến, 1916
- Born: July 10, 1772; Quỳnh Lưu district, Nghệ An province, Đàng Ngoài, Đại Việt
- Died: February 3, 1822 (aged 49); Thăng Long, Đàng Ngoài, Vietnam
- Occupation: Poet
- Spouse(s): Nguyễn Bình Kình; Phạm Viết Ngạn
- Relatives: Hồ Phi Diễn (father)
- Writing career
- Language: Vietnamese
- Period: Classical poetry
- Genres: Nôm poetry Thất ngôn bát cú (lit. 7 characters, 8 lines)

Hồ Xuân Hương (胡春香; 1772–1822) was a Vietnamese poet born at the end of the Lê dynasty. She grew up in an era of political and social turmoil – the time of the Tây Sơn rebellion and a three-decade civil war that led to Nguyễn Ánh seizing power as Emperor Gia Long and starting the Nguyễn dynasty. She wrote poetry using chữ Nôm (Southern Script), which adapts Chinese characters for writing demotic Vietnamese. She is considered to be one of Vietnam's greatest classical poets. Xuân Diệu, a prominent modern poet, dubbed her "The Queen of Nôm poetry".

== Biography ==
The facts of her life are difficult to verify, but this much is well established: she was born in Nghệ An province near the end of the rule of the Trịnh lords, and moved to Hanoi while still a child. The best guess is that she was the youngest daughter of Hồ Phi Diễn.

According to the first researchers of Hồ Xuân Hương, such as Nguyễn Hữu Tiến and Dương Quảng Hàm, she was a daughter of Hồ Phi Diễn (born in 1704) in Quỳnh Đôi Village, Quỳnh Lưu District, Nghệ An province. Hồ Phi Diễn acquired the baccalaureate diploma at the age of 24, under Lê Dụ Tông's reign. Due to his family's poverty, he had to work as a tutor in Hải Hưng, Hà Bắc for his earnings. At that place, he cohabitated with a girl from Bắc Ninh, his concubine – Hồ Xuân Hương was born as a result of that love affair.

Nevertheless, in a paper in Literature Magazine (No. 10, Hanoi 1964), Trần Thanh Mại claims that Hồ Xuân Hương's hometown was the same as mentioned above, but she was a daughter of Hồ Sĩ Danh (1706–1783) and a younger stepsister of Hồ Sĩ Đống (1738–1786).

She became locally famous and obtained a reputation of creating poems that were subtle and witty. She is believed to have married twice as her poems refer to two different husbands: Vĩnh Tường (a local official) and Tổng Cóc (a slightly higher level official). She was the second-rank wife of Tổng Cóc, in Western terms, a concubine, a role that she was clearly not happy with ("like the maid/but without the pay"). However, her second marriage did not last long as Tổng Cóc died just six months after the wedding.

She lived the remainder of her life in a small house near West Lake in Hanoi. She had visitors, often fellow poets, including two specifically named men: Scholar Tôn Phong Thi and a man only identified as "The Imperial Tutor of the Nguyễn Family." She was able to make a living as a teacher and evidently was able to travel since she composed poems about several places in Northern Vietnam.

A single woman in a Confucian society, her works show her to be independent-minded and resistant to societal norms, especially through her socio-political commentaries and her use of frank sexual humor and expressions. Her poems are usually irreverent, full of double entendres, and erudite.

== Legacy ==
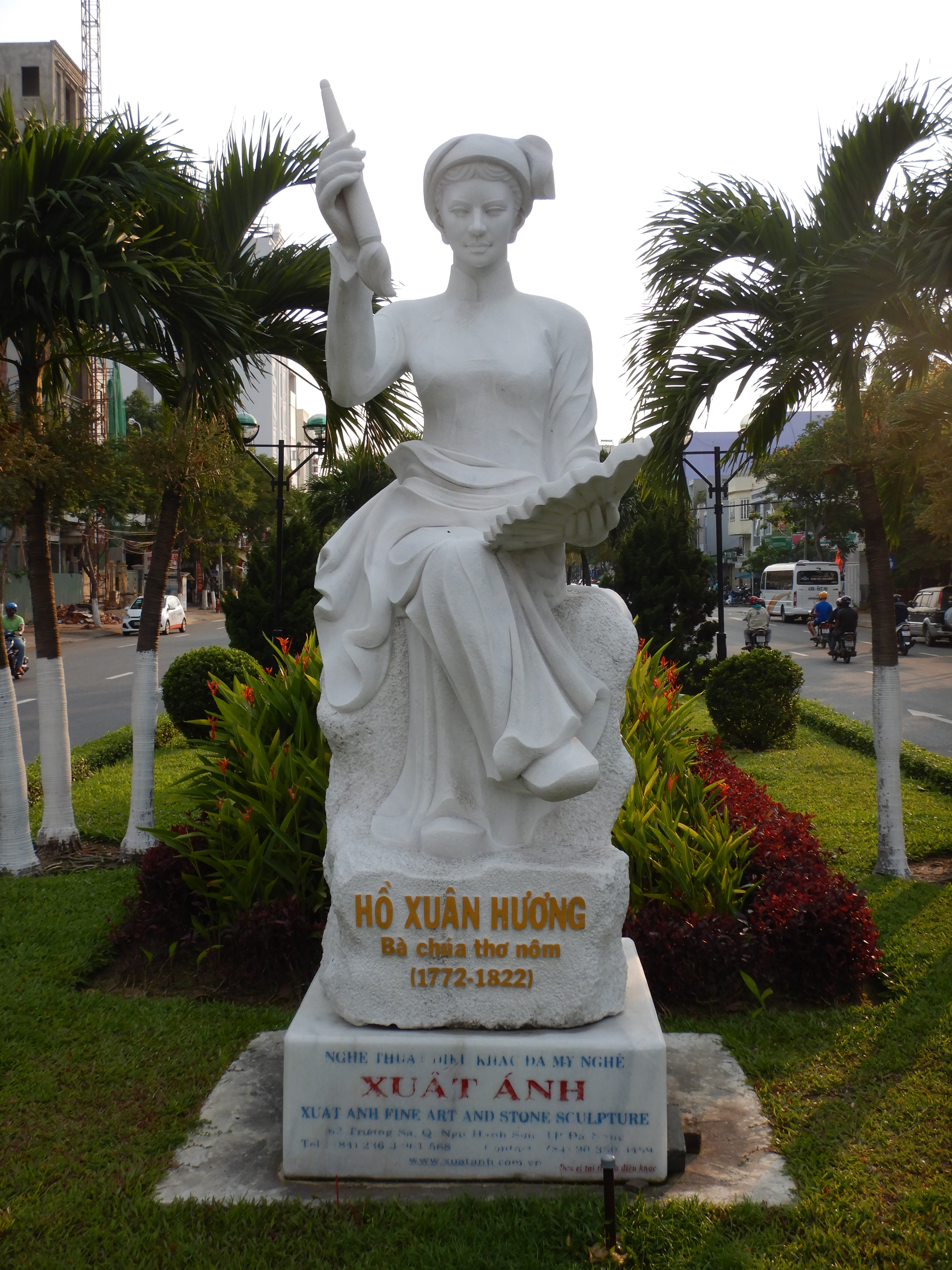
Statue of Hồ Xuân Hương in Danang

By composing the vast majority of her works in chữ Nôm, she helped to elevate the status of Vietnamese as a literary language. Recently, however, some poems have been found which she composed in literary Chinese, indicating that she was not a purist. In modern times, chữ Nôm is nearly a dead script, having been supplanted by chữ Quốc ngữ, a Latin alphabet introduced during the period of French colonization. Some of her poems were collected and translated into English in John Balaban's Spring Essence (Copper Canyon Press, 2000, ISBN 1 55659 148 9).

Another important Vietnamese poet and her contemporary is Nguyễn Du, who similarly wrote poetry in demotic Vietnamese, and so helped to found a national literature.

A few cities in Vietnam have streets named after Hồ Xuân Hương.

== Notable works ==
These are some notable works of Hồ Xuân Hương with literal translations:

=== The Jackfruit (Quả mít, 果櫗) ===
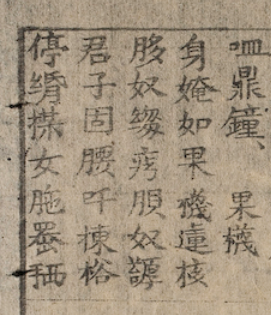

身㛪如果櫗𨕭核、
䏧奴縐𬏝𱼉奴𠫅。
君子固腰吀棟㭲、
停緍𢱖女胣𫥨𢬣。

Thân em như quả mít trên cây,
Da nó xù xì múi nó dày.
Quân tử có yêu xin đóng cọc,
Đừng mân mó nữa nhựa ra tay.

I am like a jackfruit on the tree,
Its skin is rough, its pulp is thick.
Junzi, if you love it then drive in a stake,
Don't fondle or you'll stain your hands with sap.

=== The Drifting Cake in the Water (Bánh Trôi Nước, 餅㵢渃) ===
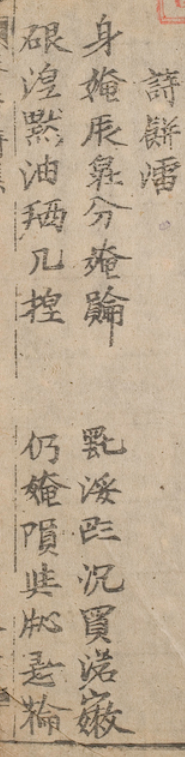

身㛪辰𤽸分㛪𧷺、
𬙞浽𠀧沉買渃𡽫。
硍涅黙油𢬣几捏、
仍㛪隕𭁈𬌓𢚸𣘈。

Thân em thì trắng phận em tròn,
Bảy nổi ba chìm mấy nước non.
Rắn nát mặc dầu tay kẻ nặn
Nhưng em vẫn giữ tấm lòng son.

My body is white, my fate is round.
Seven floatings, three sinkings among water and mountains
Hard or soft, regardless of the hands of the one who kneads,
Yet I still keep my faithful, crimson heart.

=== The Three-Mountain Pass (Đèo Ba Dội, 岧𠀧隊) ===
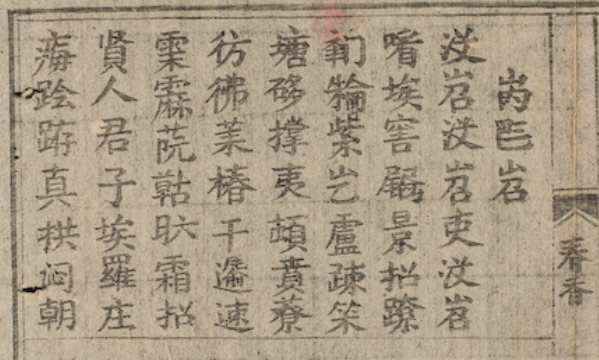

𱥺岧𱥺岧叓𱥺岧、
𠸦埃窖𤳰景招蹽。
𲈾𣘈紫𡴯盧疎󱗢、
塘𥒥撑夷頓賁𦼔。
彷彿䒹椿干𩙌速、
󱯱󱯫𦰟𦹵𣅶霜招。
䝨人君子埃羅庄、
痗󱖺𨀛真拱闷朝。

Một đèo một đèo lại một đèo,
Khen ai khéo vẽ cảnh cheo leo.
Cửa son tía ngắt lơ thơ móc,
Đường đá xanh rì lún phún rêu.
Phưởng phất chồi thông cơn gió tốc,
Mịt mờ ngọn cỏ lúc sương gieo.
Hiền nhân quân tử ai là chẳng,
Mỏi gối chồn chân cũng muốn trèo?

One pass, one pass, yet another pass,
Praise the one who skillfully painted such a precarious scene.
The vermilion gate, glaring, sparsely hung with vines,
The stone path, greenish, sprinkled with moss.
Pine shoots waft in the rushing wind,
Grass tips grow dim when the dew is cast.
For sages and junzi, who would not,
Though knees ache and feet grow weary, still long to climb?

== Sources ==
- Forbes, Andrew, and Henley, David: Vietnam Past and Present: The North (History and culture of Hanoi and Tonkin). Chiang Mai. Cognoscenti Books, 2012.
- Outstanding Vietnamese Women Before the 20th Century published in English by The Gioi Publishers, 2006.
- Hồ Xuân Hương, nha tho cach mang (Hồ Xuân Hương - A Revolutionary Poet) by Hoa Bang, 1982.
