= Bạch Diệp =

Vietnamese film director (1929–2013)

Bạch Diệp (白葉; 1929–2013), also known as Nguyễn Thanh Tâm (阮清心). was one of North Vietnam's first prominent female film director during the Post-War era of the Vietnam War. Her familial lineage has a strong association with photography and camera work. She is often heralded as "the most important woman director " by several film scholars and was awarded the People's Artist Award in 1997 among several other accomplishments

== Early life and education ==
Bạch Diệp was born in 1929 in Hanoi. She and her family had a long history of photography and camera work. Later on in her childhood, she was sent to Saint Dominique Monastery in Haiphong. In 1944, her family moved to Hải Dương. At the age of 16, she followed the Viet Minh, participated in the general uprising and "joined women in national salvation in Hải Dương and then worked in the Provincial Association and the inter-provincial affairs III". In 1955, she moved to work at Nhân Dân, head of the Hanoi team, responsible for information about the city.”

== Career ==
Bạch Diệp took a film class in 1959 and attended the Movie School at the Ministry of Culture and Information. She was trained by Russian cinematographers and film experts, known as the East Bloc artists such as Ajdai Ibraghimov, an Azerbaijanian from the Soviet Union. Bạch Diệp’s career went well into her 80s. She died in 2013. Although she formally retired in 1992, she continued to guide others as a film collaborator. She was still fascinated with filmmaking despite dealing with cancer. She was invited to make a TV Series for Vietnamese Television. Diep made films for the 7th Dimension Cinema and Sunday Arts. Bạch Diệp is credited for the creation of fifteen films, with two being very notable - Ngày Lễ Thánh (The Holy Day) (1976) and Huyền Thoại Về Người Mẹ (The Legend of a Mother) (1987).

== Style and themes ==
Bạch Diệp was noted to explore the "innermost feelings of characters" in most of her films. Diệp tries to display emotional journeys through the narrative plots of her film and shows the emotional dilemmas that characters have to face. For example, in Trừng Phạt (Punishment) (1983), Diệp depicts the "remorse of US-backed Vietnamese Soldiers through the interactions that the Vietnamese soldiers have with the US. Film scholars refer to her work as "something meaningful and new to cinematic arts."

She follows the turmoils of most female/women characters such as mothers in Huyền Thoại Về Người Mẹ (The Legend of a Mother) (1987). In The Legend of a Mother (1987), the audience follows a revolutionary woman by the name of Hương and how Hương's husband dies in the war. The film also depicts Hương as midwife at a hospital and eventually as the adoptive mother to three children whose mother (also women soldiers) went missing or died in the war. The Legend of a Mother (1987) shows themes of how Vietnamese culture places significant importance to "folk devotion to the dead" meaning in Vietnamese culture, there are elaborate and traditions when remembering those who passed.

In The Legend of a Mother (1987), Diệp shows the dual nature of the "revolutionary mother" and deconstructs the national concept of what it means to be "a mother". Diệp extends the concept of motherhood beyond "physical maternity and immediate kinship to the nurturance and protection of children." The Legend of a Mother (1987) challenges patriarchal family views by reasserting what it means to be parents to children.

Post-war film typically will draw on historical legacy and historical events to try and create a sense of nationalized patriotic duty. Bạch Diệp follows this style heavily in The Legend of a Mother (1987).

== Personal life ==
At the age of 27, Diệp married the Vietnamese poet Xuân Diệu, who was 40 years old at the time, they lived for a few years but ultimately divorced without having children. She later lived with and married Nguyễn Đức Tường and the marriage lasted for 15 years. The two had no children either. In various news articles recording Bạch Diệp's live after her death at 85 in 2013, other artists are interviewed and state how much Diệp has impacted them critically with her films and her work with them. Diệp was diagnosed with cancer and struggled with it until she died in her hometown of Hà Nội.

== Filmography ==
She made films from 1963 to 1992, her first film was Tran Quoc in Battle.

- Films with the original Vietnamese title are followed by their rough Vietnamese to English translation in the parenthesis. There are many interpretations of how these titles are translated.
  - Trần Quốc Toản ra Quân (Tran Quoc in Battle) (Adapted from Chèo) (Year Unknown) - Initial Film Debut
  - Người Về Đồng Cói (The Sick Person) (1973)
  - Ngày Lễ Thánh (The Holy Day) (1976)
  - Câu Chuyện Làng Dừa (The Coconut Story)(1977)
  - Người Chưa Biết Nói (The One Who Does Not Know How to Speak Yet) (1979)
  - Ai Giận Ai Thương (Who is Angry? And Who Loves?) (1982)
  - Mảnh Trời Riêng (Private Sunshine) (1983)
  - Trừng Phạt (Punishment) (1983)
  - Y Hơ Nua (Them Again) (1985)
  - Cuộc Chia Tay Không Hẹn Trước (The Farewell without an Appointment) (1986)
  - Huyền Thoại Về Người Mẹ (The Legend of a Mother) (1987)
  - Ngõ Hẹp (Alley) (1988)
  - Hoa Ban Đỏ (Red Rash) (1994)

== Awards and nominations ==
Bạch Diệp was awarded and noted several times by scholars of different nationalities as a very important women director of Vietnam. Regardless of her political ideology, she remains one of the most documented Vietnamese woman filmmaker. Additionally, she among other East Bloc artists, is recorded in the Soviet Encyclopedia of Cinema.

Here is a list of her notable achievements:

- Trần Quốc Toản ra Quân (Tran Quoc in Battle, Unknown) - The film won a Bông Sen Bạc (Silver Lotus Award) at the Second Vietnam Film Festival in 1988
- Diệp was awarded the Nghệ Sĩ Nhân Dân (People's Artist Award) in 1997
- Diệp won the State Prize for Literature and Art for The Holy Day (1976) & The Legend of a Mother (1987) in 2007
- Diệp was established as one of the contemporary film artists celebrated at the 55th anniversary of the Vietnam Film Festival in 2008

== Bibliography ==
- Charlot, John. “Vietnam, The Strangers Meet: The Vietnam Film Project,” “Films of the Pacific.” In Hawaiʻi International Film Festival, November 27–December 3, 1988, 44–49, 84–87. Honolulu: The East-West Center, 1988.
- Charlot, John. "Vietnamese Cinema: First Views." Journal of Southeast Asian Studies 22, no. 1 (1991): 33–62. JSTOR 20071262. 41.
- Hixson, Walter L. “Historical Memory and Representations of the Vietnam War.” In Historical Memory and Representations of the Vietnam War, 41. Taylor & Francis, 2000.
- Kelly, Gabrielle, and Cheryl Robson. “Vietnam, Cambodia, Laos: Women Directors of the Post-War Era.” In Celluloid Ceiling: Women Film Directors Breaking Through. Aurora Metro Books, 2014.
- Thuan, Le Xuan. “The First Director of Vietnam - Bạch Diệp - People’s Artist’s Death. The Thao Van Hoa. 2013.
- NLD.COM.VN. “NSND Bạch Diệp: Một Đời Sống Cho Điện Ảnh.” https://nld.com.vn, August 18, 2013. https://nld.com.vn/c1020n20130818101640704.htm.
- Sarker, Sonita, and Esha Niyogi De. “The Question of Women in Vietnamese Nationalism.” In Trans-Status Subjects: Gender in the Globalization of South and Southeast Asia, 344. Duke University Press, 2002. 111.
