= Pronouns in Vietnamese =

Words in Vietnamese that substitute for a noun or noun phrase

In general, a Vietnamese pronoun (Vietnamese: đại từ nhân xưng, lit. 'Person-calling pronoun', or Vietnamese: đại từ xưng hô) can serve as a noun phrase. In Vietnamese, a pronoun usually connotes a degree of family relationship or kinship. In polite speech, the aspect of kinship terminology is used when referring to oneself, the audience, or a third party. These terms may vary by region. Many are derived from Chinese loanwords but have acquired the additional grammatical function of being pronouns.

Vietnamese terms of reference may imply the social relationship between the speaker and the person being referred to, differences in age, and even the attitude of the speaker toward that person. Thus a speaker must carefully assess these factors to decide the appropriate term. Strangers may ask each other about age when they first meet to establish proper terms of address. If the speaker does not know the listener, there are certain pronoun pairs to address oneself and the listener to sound respectful.

== True pronouns ==
True pronouns are categorized into two classes depending on if they can be preceded by the plural marker chúng, bọn, or các. Like some other Asian pronominal systems, Vietnamese pronouns indicate the social status between speakers and others in the conversation in addition to grammatical person and number.

The table below shows the first class of pronouns that can be preceded by a pluralizer. The parenthetical information next to these pronoun forms indicates information about the social status between the speaker and another person (or persons). Thus, "inferior to superior" indicates that the speaker is in an inferior or lower social status with respect another person (such as the hearer) who is in a superior or higher social status. The label "familiar" indicates that the speaker and another person are in a closer relationship such as between family members or between close friends. The label "intimate" refers to a very close relationship such as that between spouses or lovers.

	Singular	Plural
First person	tôi (could be formal)	bọn tôi, chúng tôi (excluding the addressed subject)
First person	ta (neutral, non-formal)	bọn ta, chúng ta (including the addressed subject)
First person	tao (superior to subordinate, familiar)	bọn tao, chúng tao (vulgar, excluding the addressed subject)
First person	mình (intimate)	mình, chúng mình, bọn mình (intimate, including the addressed subject)
Second person	mày or mi (superior to inferior, familiar)	bay (or bây), chúng mày, tụi mày, bọn mày, chúng bay (or chúng bây) (superior to subordinate, familiar)
Third person	nó (superior to subordinate, familiar)	chúng nó, bọn nó

Tôi was an archaic noun meaning "servant", as in vua tôi ("the monarch and his servants"). There are parallel self-deprecating first-person pronominalizations of words for "servant" in other languages, such as 奴 (nù) in Eastern Min and 僕 (boku) in Japanese. Tôi is often used formally and conveys the connotation of equal status, regardless of age. Another word with the same semantic development is tớ, although it is used informally among similarly aged peers.

Mình is still used as a noun with its original meaning, "body". It is also used as a reflexive pronoun in all persons. For example, Tôi biết mình không giỏi ("I know I (myself) am not good"), Nó tự hỏi mình ("They ask themselves").

The first person tôi is the only pronoun that can be used in polite speech. The first person ta is often used when talking to oneself as in a soliloquy, but also indicates a higher status of the speaker (such as that of a high official, etc.). The other superior-to-inferior forms in the first and second persons (tao, mày, mi, bay (or bây)) are commonly used in familiar social contexts, such as among family members (e.g. older sister to younger sister, etc.). These forms are otherwise considered impolite, and various forms of pronoun avoidance such as using kinship terms are used instead. The third person form nó (used to refer to animals, children, and scorned adults, such as criminals) is considerably less arrogant than the second person forms tao, mày, mi, bay (or bây). The pronoun mình, when referring to the singular first person, is used only in intimate relationships, such as between spouses.

The pronominal forms in the table above can be modified with chúng as in chúng mày, chúng nó. Exclusive/inclusive plural distinctions exist in the first person: chúng tôi and chúng tao are exclusive (i.e., me and them but not you), chúng ta and chúng mình are inclusive (i.e., you and me). Some of the forms (ta, mình, bay, bây) can be used to refer to a plural referent, resulting in pairs with overlapping reference (e.g., both ta and chúng ta mean "inclusive we").

The other class of pronouns are known as "absolute" pronouns. These cannot be modified with the pluralizer chúng. Many of these forms are literary and archaic, particularly in the first and second person.

	Singular	Plural
First person	min (familiar, literary)	choa (literary)
First person	qua (male to female, literary)	choa (literary)
First person	thiếp (female to male, literary)	choa (literary)
First person	trẫm (sovereign to mandarins or subjects, archaic)	choa (literary)
Second Person	mi (familiar, literary)	–
Second Person	bậu (female to male, literary)	–
Second Person	ngài (respectful, hierarchic, formal)	–
Second Person	chàng (female to male, literary)	–
Third Person	y (familiar)	người ta
Third Person	hắn (familiar)	người ta
Third Person	nghỉ (literary)	người ta
Third Person	va (familiar, male)	người ta

Unlike the first type of pronoun, these absolute third person forms (y, hắn, va) refer only to animate referents (typically people). The form y can be preceded by the pluralizer in southern dialects in which case it is more respectful than nó. The absolute pronoun người ta has a wider range of reference as "they, people in general, (generic) one, we, someone".

== Kinship terms ==
Kinship terms are the most popular ways to refer to oneself and others. Anyone can be referred to using kinship terms, not just the speaker's relatives. The Vietnamese kinship terms are quite complex. While there is some flexibility as to which kinship terms should be used for people not related to the speaker, often only one term applies to people related by blood or marriage for up to three generations, which may also differ based on dialect. Some kinship terms are:

Term	Reciprocal	Literal meaning	Non-kinship usage	Note
cha	con	father	a priest	May sound too literary for contemporary use. Preferred in literary contexts (folkloric tales, myths, proverbs, etc.), although have been found in certain contemporary television dramas set in modern times. Many other terms are preferred in actual use, depending on the dialect: ba, bố, tía, thầy. Archaic: bác, áng.
thầy	con	father	a male teacher; a monk; a deacon	Only the non-kinship sense is universal. The "father" sense is only dialectal in the north.
mẹ	con	mother		mẹ is the Northern form, má the Southern. Many other terms are used, depending on the dialect: u, bầm, mạ, má. Archaic: nạ.
anh	em	older brother	a non-elderly man; a man who's a little older, like one's own "big brother"; can be used as a romantic term of endearment	
chị	em	older sister	a non-elderly woman; a woman who's a little older, like one's own "big sister"; can be used as a romantic term of endearment	
em	anh or chị	younger sibling	a person who's a little younger, like one's own "little sibling"; a student; can be used as a romantic term of endearment	
con	cha, mẹ, bà, etc.	biological child or grandchild	a much younger person, usually in southern use	
cháu	ông, bà, bác, chú, etc.	grandchild, niece, or nephew	a much younger person, usually in northern use	
chắt	cụ	great-grandchild		
ông	cháu or con	grandfather	an old man; formally, a middle-aged man	Paternal and maternal grandfathers are differentiated as ông nội (paternal grandfather) and ông ngoại (maternal grandfather), respectively. Nội (literally "inside") and ngoại (literally "outside", from the Chinese prefix for maternal relatives) are also used for short in the south.
bà	cháu or con	grandmother	an old woman; formally, a middle-aged woman	Paternal and maternal grandmothers are differentiated as bà nội (paternal grandmother) and bà ngoại (maternal grandmother), respectively. Nội (literally "inside") and ngoại (literally "outside", from the Chinese prefix for maternal relatives) are also used for short in the south.
cô	cháu	father's younger sister	a female teacher; a woman who's a little younger than one's parent, like their "little sister"; a young adult woman	In southern dialects, means father's sister, regardless of age. In some dialects, o is used instead. When paired with chú, always precedes it, as in cô chú.
chú	cháu	father's younger brother, or thím's husband	a man who's a little younger than one's parent, like their "little brother"	In some dialects, literal meaning is restricted to father's younger brother
thím	cháu	chú's wife	informally, an effeminate man	dialectally also mợ or mự
bác	cháu	parent's older sibling and their spouse	a person who's a little older than one's parents	Like em, modified by trai (male) or gái (female). In southern dialects, literal meaning is restricted to father's older brother and his spouse
dì	cháu	mother's younger sister, or stepmother		In southern dialects, means mother's sister, regardless of age
cậu	cháu	mother's younger brother		In southern dialects, means mother's brother, regardless of age
cậu	tớ	friend		In northern dialects, used for saying I,me and you to a colleague or a friend, similar to tôi and bạn in Southern dialects.
mợ	cháu	cậu's wife		In some dialects, used by the husband to refer to his wife, children to refer to mother, or parents-in-law to refer to a daughter-in-law
dượng	cháu	the husband of cô or dì, or stepfather		dialectally also trượng
cụ/cố	cháu	great-grandparent	a very old person	
sơ	cháu		great-great-grandparent	This pronoun can be used for nuns (derived from French soeur), although the reciprocal is con.
họ		either the paternal or maternal extended family	they	third person plural

Except the terms for "father", "mother" and "child", all others, such as "elder brother", "elder sister", "younger sibling", "uncle", "aunt", "nephew/niece/grandchild", etc. are usable for cousins, and cousinship is inherited from older generations and through marriage. In this regard, grandparents, aunts and uncles, nieces and nephews, etc. are a kind of closer "cousins" to the speaker; the further a relative is, the further back the speaker has to trace in order to know exactly if they should use "grandpa", "grandma", "uncle", "aunt", etc. Distant cousins with "grandparent status" that are younger than the speaker may be referred to as ông/bà trẻ ("young grandpa/ma"). This phenomenon is highlighted in a Vietnamese proverb: Bé bằng củ khoai, cứ vai mà gọi (Small as a potato, but call by rank). In practice, age differences are commonplace, and some people may be hesitant to take advantage of their superior cousin status.

Despite this complicated system of kinship, when talking about cousins, even most Vietnamese are only concerned about anh họ, chị họ or em họ. Whether someone is "elder brother", "elder sister" or "younger sibling" depends on their relation to the speaker's parent's: for example, if the addressee is the younger brother of the speaker's mother's, his children are also always the speaker's "younger siblings" regardless of the ages of those cousins. If the speaker is married, they also inherit their spouse's cousinship, which means they will become an "older brother" or "older sister" regardless of their "younger sibling" cousins' ages.

Outside of actual kinship, kinship terms are used depending on age differences, in informal contexts, or in a friendly way toward children. When addressing a stranger, the speaker may have to consider whether this person is a bit or a lot older or younger than themself or their parents. This could be done by asking and knowing their age, or simply through guesswork. If the speaker is rather young and talking to a very old person, the speaker generally defaults to ông or bà for the addressee and cháu or con for themself. In formal contexts, however, only a few terms can be used based on how young or old the stranger appears: anh (young or middle-aged men), chị or cô (young or middle-aged women), ông (old men) and bà (old women); the reciprocal term would be the true pronoun tôi. For rather young people in their early twenties, the non-kinship term bạn ("friend") is also a recognized usage.

Singular kinship terms can be pluralized using the plural marker các, as in các anh. When speaking to an audience in a formal context, kinship terms are often strung together to cover common individual relationships: các anh chị em refers to an audience of roughly the same age, while các ông bà anh chị em, sometimes abbreviated ÔBACE, refers to an audience of all ages.

== Non-kinship terms used as pronouns ==
In Vietnamese, virtually any noun used for a person can be used as a pronoun. These terms usually have only one grammatical person meaning and unlike kinship terms, do not serve multiple roles. Words such as "doctor", "teacher", "owner", etc. can be used as a second-person personal pronoun when needed. When referring to themselves, Vietnamese speakers, like speakers of Chinese, Japanese, and Korean languages, tend to deprecate their position while elevating the audience. While many of these terms are obsolete, some remain in widespread usage. The most prominent is tôi, literally meaning "servant". It is used as a fairly neutral term for "I" (neither very friendly, nor very formal). Tớ, also meaning "servant", is also popular among young people to refer to themselves with close friends (used in conjunction with cậu for "lad").

Pronouns that elevate the audience still in use include quý khách (valued customer), quý vị (esteemed guests). Bạn (friend) is also popular among young people as a way of addressing each other.

Vietnamese speakers also refer to themselves and others by name, eliminating the need for personal pronouns altogether. For example:

An: Bình đang làm gì vậy?
Bình: Bình đang gọi Chính. An có biết Chính ở đâu không?
An: Không, An không biết Chính ở đâu hết.

Directly translated into English, the conversation would run thus:

An: What is Bình doing?
Bình: Bình is calling Chính. Does An know where Chính is?
An: No, An doesn't know where Chính is.

A normal translation of the conversation into English would be:

An: What are you doing?
Bình: I'm calling Chính. Do you know where he is?
An: No, I don't know where he is.

While always referring to oneself or the audience by name would be considered strange in English, in Vietnamese it is considered friendly and slightly respectful, especially between acquaintances of different genders who are not very close (as to use even more familiar terms such as tao, mày), or between young girls. Referring to oneself by name is also the preferred way used by music artists, or even actors, models, etc. However, in a kinship context, people with a lower rank cannot address their superiors by name.

== Obsolete pronouns ==
With the abolition of the monarchy in 1945, some pronouns, such as the royal trẫm and others related to royalty and Confucianism, have fallen out of use and are no longer applicable and use in contemporary Vietnamese and are mostly encountered in historical texts, literature, and formal writings. Archaic pronouns include:

- trẫm (朕) – used by the monarch to refer to themselves, adopted like the Japanese chin from its use by the Chinese emperors following the example of Shi Huangdi
- khanh (卿) – used by the monarch to address a favored subject
- bệ hạ (陛下) – used by subjects when addressing the monarch; compare to English "your majesty"
- thị (氏) – This pronoun referred to females in the third person, similar to "she." In modern Vietnamese, "cô" or "chị" is more common.
- tiên sinh (先生) - used to refer to a (male) gentleman, educated person, teacher, master.
- tiền bối (先輩) - used to refer to an older and experienced honorable person or a predecessor of particular field. Example: Các bậc tiền bối trong phong trào Cách mạng. (Old Vanguards of the Revolution.)
- ngươi: This pronoun was historically used to refer to the second person singular (i.e., "you"). In modern Vietnamese, "bạn" or "anh/chị" is used instead.
- ta: This pronoun was used for the first person singular (i.e., "I" or "me"). Nowadays, "tôi" or "mình" is more commonly used.
- chàng: This pronoun was used to refer to a male in a respectful manner, similar to "sir" or "gentleman." In modern Vietnamese, "ông" or "anh" might be used in similar contexts.
- thiếp: This was a humble way for women to refer to themselves, often used in romantic contexts or by women of lower status. It has largely fallen out of use in favor of "em" or "tôi."
- phô: A polite plural marker used for pronouns such as phô bay, phô ngươi, phô ông phô bà, etc.
- mớ: A plural marker used only first and second person such as mớ tôi and mớ bay.
- tam: This pronoun was used to refer to a younger sibling. It is used in compounds such as anh tam and em tam.

== Pairs ==
With the exception of tôi, pronouns typically go hand-in-hand with another: when one is used to refer to the speaker, the other must be used to refer to the audience.

== See also ==
- Vietnamese name
- Vietnamese alphabet
- Vietnamese language
- Sino-Vietnamese vocabulary
- Thai honorifics#Personal pronouns
