= Can Lộc =

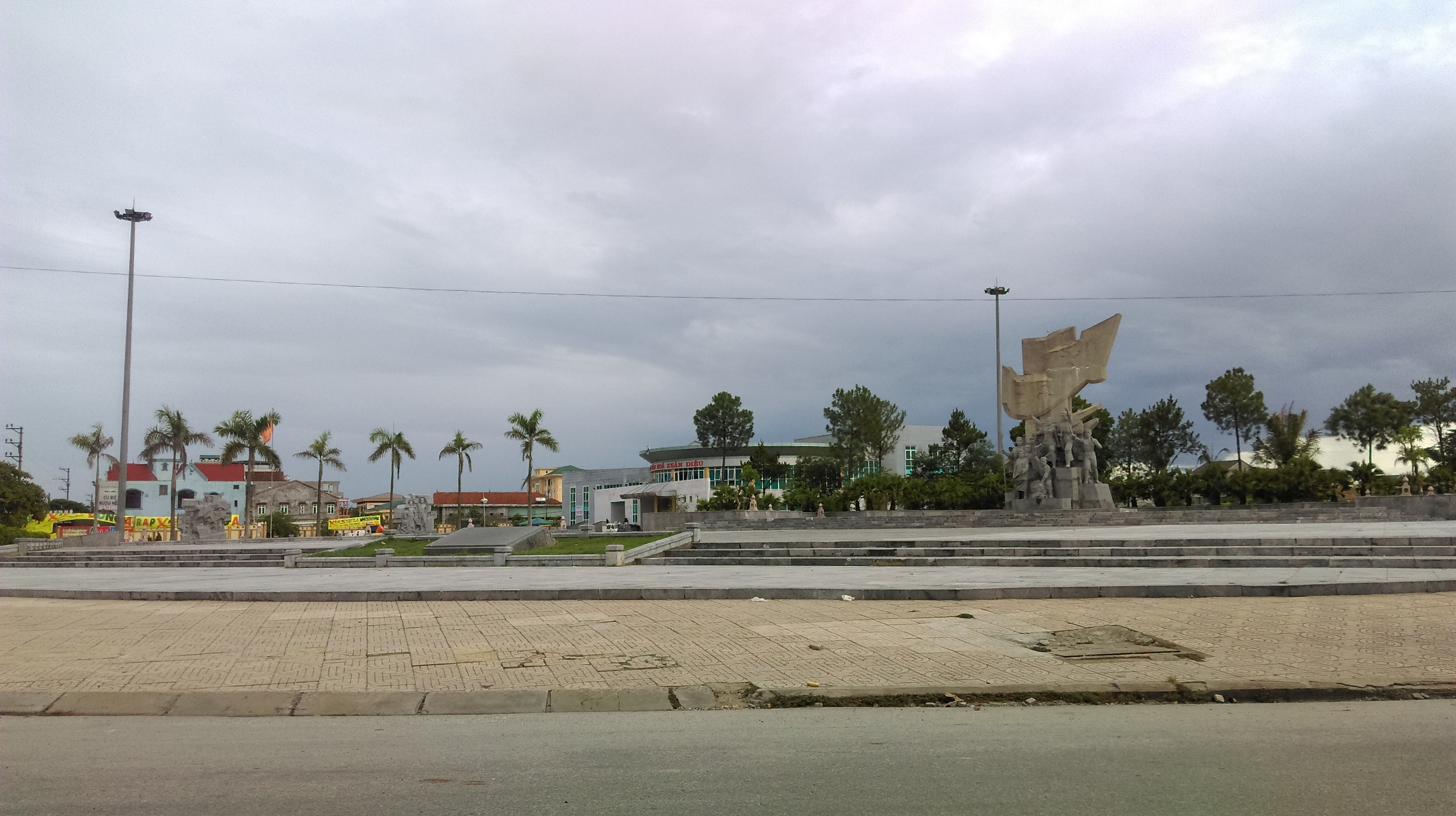
- Ngã ba Nghèn Memorial Site
- Interactive map of Can Lộc
- Coordinates: 18.45254087589731°N 105.78451927462666°E
- Country: Vietnam
- Region: North Central Coast
- Province: Hà Tĩnh
- Established: 2025
- Administrative headquarters: Nguyễn Huy Tự Street

Area
  - Total: 65.70 km^{2} (25.37 sq mi)

Population (2025)
  - Total: 41,153
  - Density: 626/km^{2} (1,620/sq mi)
- Website: canloc.hatinh.gov.vn

Can Lộc is a commune in Hà Tĩnh province, Vietnam.

On 16 June 2025, the National Assembly of Vietnam decided to merge the entire area and population of Nghèn township, Thiên Lộc commune, and Vượng Lộc commune to form a new commune named Can Lộc.
