= Vĩnh Bảo =

- Commune
- Interactive map of Vĩnh Bảo
- Coordinates: 20.69454189060689°N 106.4951133734283°E
- Country: Vietnam
- Region: Red River Delta
- Municipality: Hai Phong
- Established: 16 June 2025
- Administrative headquarters: 20 August Street

Area
  - Total: 30.60 km^{2} (11.81 sq mi)

Population (2025)
  - Total: 45,332
  - Density: 1,481/km^{2} (3,840/sq mi)
- Website: vinhbao.haiphong.gov.vn

Vĩnh Bảo is a commune in the municipality of Hai Phong, Vietnam.

== History ==
The area of present-day Vĩnh Bảo Commune was formerly located in Vĩnh Bảo district, Hai Phong.

On 16 June 2025, the Standing Committee of the National Assembly of Vietnam issued a resolution on the arrangement of commune-level administrative units in Hai Phong in 2025. Under the resolution, the entire area and population of Vĩnh Bảo Township and Vĩnh Hưng, Tân Hưng, and Tân Liên communes were merged to form a new commune named Vĩnh Bảo.
