= Tam Điệp pass =

Mountain pass in Vietnam

Coordinates: 20°07′53″N 105°51′30″E

Tam Điệp pass (Vietnam)

The Tam Điệp pass (Sino-Vietnamese name: Đèo Tam Điệp, demotic folk name: Đèo Ba Dội, 岧𠀧隊) is the name of the three passes between ancient Thăng Long and Ninh Bình and Thanh Hóa provinces.
