= Huy Cận =

Vietnamese poet (1919–2005)

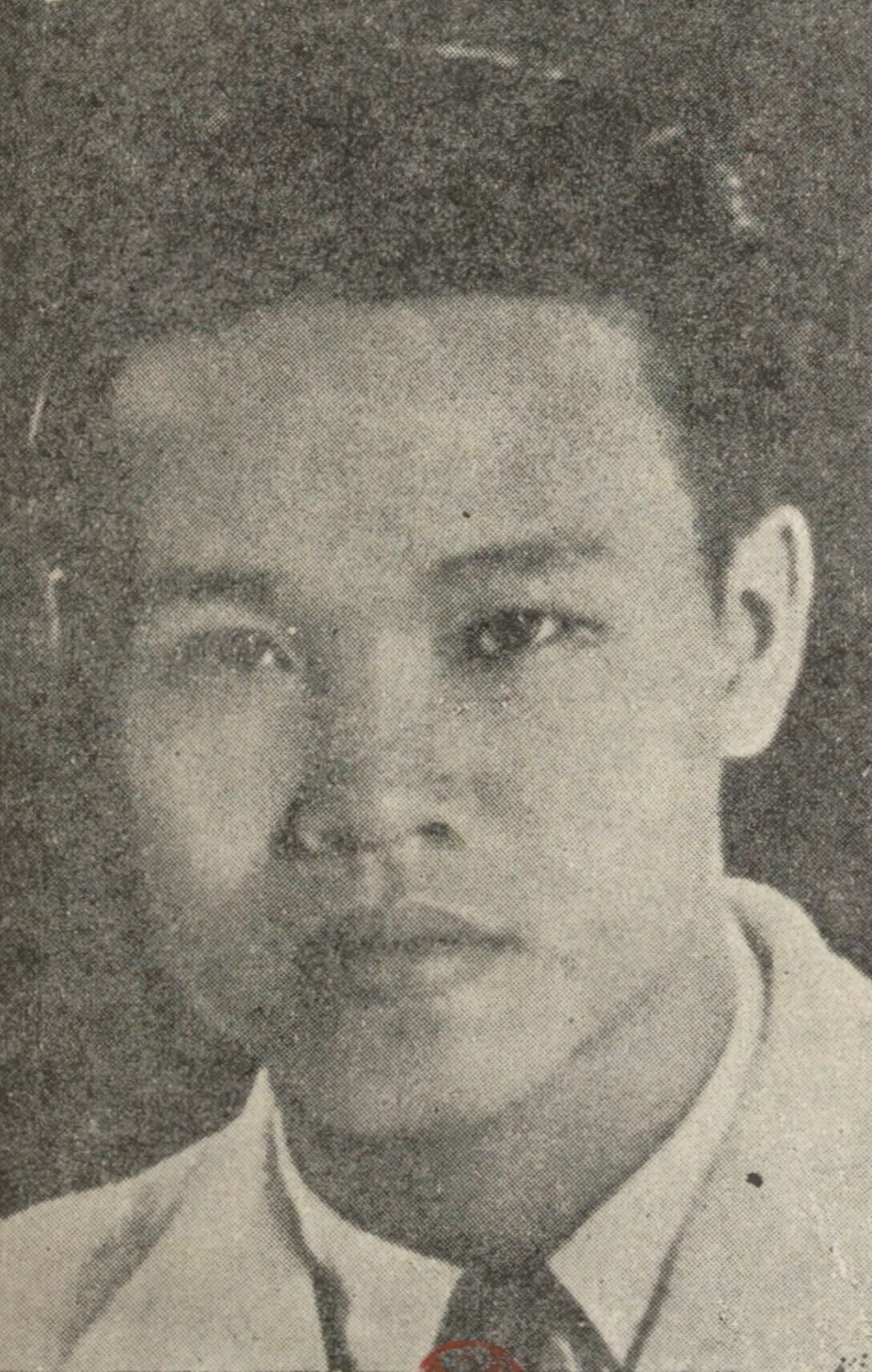
- Born: Cù Huy Cận; May 31, 1919; Vũ Quang, Hà Tĩnh, French Indochina
- Died: May 31, 2005 (aged 86); Hà Nội, Vietnam
- Occupations: Statesman, poet
- Writing career
- Notable work: Lửa thiêng (1940)
- Notable awards: Ho Chi Minh Prize

Cù Huy Cận (31 May 1919 – 19 February 2005) was a Vietnamese poet, a close confidante of Ho Chi Minh, and signed Vietnam's Declaration of Independence as Cabinet minister in the first Government of the Democratic Republic of Vietnam, and held many senior leadership positions in the Vietnamese government between 1946 and 1987. He was a close friend of Xuân Diệu, another famous poet. His first collection of poems, Sacred Fire, was published in 1938. His style changed drastically after the Vietnam Revolution, from melancholy to optimistic. His son is Cù Huy Hà Vũ, legal scholar and dissident.
