= Khái Hưng =

Vietnamese novelist (1896–1947)

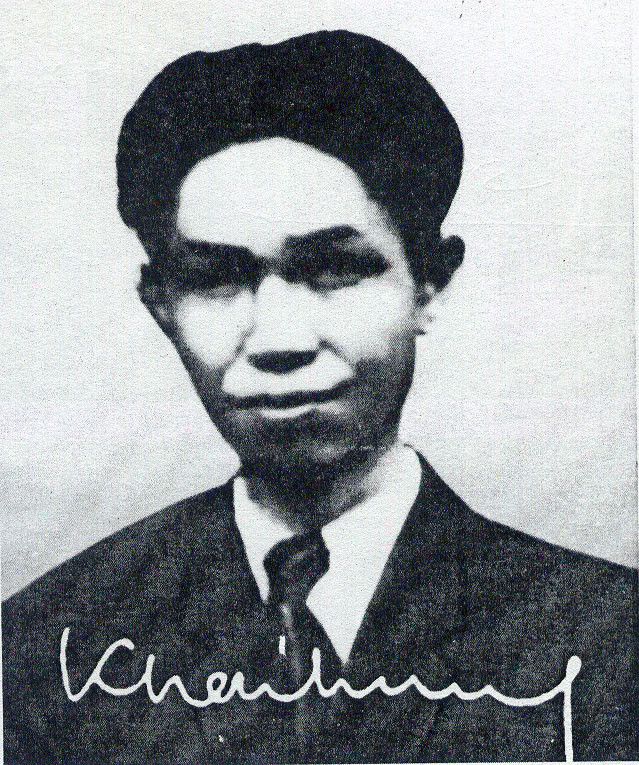
Khai Hung

Trần Khánh Giư, pen-name Khái Hưng (1896 in Cổ Am village, Vĩnh Bảo, Hải Phòng – 1947 in Nam Định) was a Vietnamese novelist, member of Self-Reliant Literary Group, and a nationalist intellectual.

As a boy, he studied at the Lycée Albert Sarraut in Hanoi. From 1933 he was a member of the new Self-Reliant Literary Group with editor Nhất Linh; his novels were first serialized in the group's magazines before being published as books. Just as Nhất Linh was a pen name ("One-Zero" 壹零) Giu briefly adopted the pen name Nhị Linh ("Two-Zero" 貳零).

In 1941, as a member of Nhat Linh's Đại Việt Dân chính Đảng he was arrested by the French, along with the artist Nguyễn Gia Trí.

He was captured by the Việt Minh in the Lạc Quần, Trực Ninh area, and executed at Cựa Gà on 17 November 1947.

== Works ==
His novels were written in a style influenced by social realism, and were critical of many aspects of traditional Vietnamese society.

=== Novels ===
- Hồn bướm mơ tiên (1933)
- Ðời mưa gió (with Nhất Linh, 1933)
- Nửa chừng xuân (1934)
- Gánh hàng hoa (with Nhất Linh, 1934)
- Trống mái (1936)
- Gia đình (1936)
- Tiêu sơn tráng sĩ (1937)
- Thoát ly (1938)
- Hạnh (1938)
- Ðẹp (1940)
- Thanh Ðức (1942)

=== Collections of stories ===
- Anh phải sống (with Nhất Linh, 1934)
- Tiếng suối reo (1935)
- Ðợi chờ (1940)
- Cái ve (1944)
