= Trần Tế Xương =

Vietnamese poet and satirist

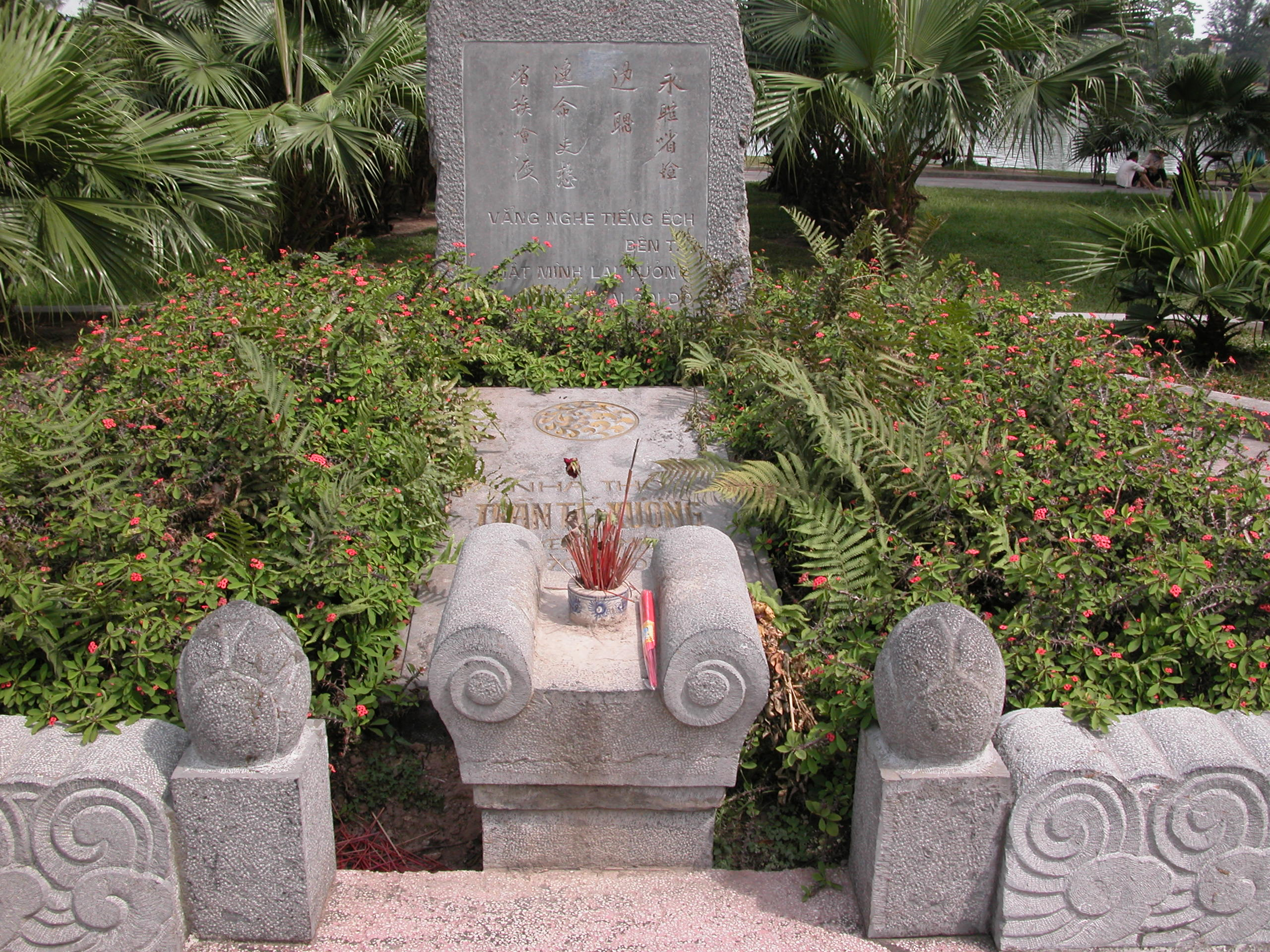
His tomb in Nam Định.

Trần Tế Xương (chu Han 陳濟昌) also known by the pen name Tú Xương (Mặc Trai, Mộng Tích, Tử Thịnh 11 June 1870 - 29 January 1907) was a Vietnamese poet and satirist. His poems and literary works frequently targeted the gallicization of the Vietnamese middle classes.
