= Nhất Linh =

Vietnamese writer (1906–1963)

Nguyễn Tường Tam Nhất Linh
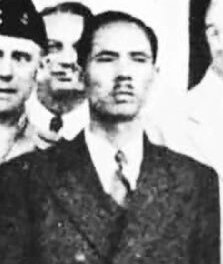

Minister of Foreign Affairs of the Democratic Republic of Vietnam
- In office 2 March 1946 – 3 November 1946
- President: Hồ Chí Minh
- Preceded by: Hồ Chí Minh
- Succeeded by: Hồ Chí Minh

Personal details
- Born: 1907 Cẩm Giàng district, Hải Dương province, French Indochina
- Died: 7 July 1963 (aged 55–56) Saigon, South Vietnam
- Cause of death: Suicide
- Party: VNQDĐ ĐVDCĐ

Nguyễn Tường Tam (Vietnamese pronunciation: [ŋwiən˦ˀ˥ tɨəŋ˨˩ taːm˧˧]; chữ Hán: 阮祥三 or 阮祥叄; Cẩm Giàng, Hải Dương 25 July 1906 – Saigon, 7 July 1963) better known by his pen-name Nhất Linh ([ɲət̚˧˦ lïŋ˧˧], 一靈, "One Spirit") was a Vietnamese writer, editor and publisher in colonial Hanoi. He founded the literary group and publishing house Tự Lực Văn Đoàn ("Self-Strengthening Literary Group") in 1932 with the literary magazines Phong Hóa ("Customs", or "Mores") and Ngày Nay ("Today"), and serialized, then published, many of the influential realism-influenced novels of the 1930s.

In 1935, Nguyễn published a satirical and fictional travelogue about his time in France, Going to the West (Đi Tây). His aim was to show that the French colonialists did not grant to the working classes in Vietnam the same rights they accorded to workers in France. In addition to Nhất Linh, scholars have noted that the many Vietnamese westernized elites returning from France had been embracing the French "ideal of progress" as a lens to imagine Vietnam in a modern light of social equality and democracy. During this time period, he also wrote Đoạn tuyệt, a novel about a highly individualist woman trapped in a loveless marriage. This book was widely read and saw many reprints and reissues over years. The novel also attracted much controversy, because it condemned and criticized many major tenets of traditional Vietnamese culture. It was part of South Vietnam's high school curriculum until 1975.

In the 1940s he organized a political party, Đại Việt Dân Chính ("Great Viet Democratic Party" DVDC). Tam fled to China where he was arrested on the orders of Zhang Fakui, who at same time had arrested Ho Chi Minh. This faction soon merged with the larger Đại Việt Quốc Dân Đảng ("Great Viet Nationalist Party" DVQDD) and later this too merged into the Việt Nam Quốc Dân Đảng ("Vietnamese Nationalist Party" VNQDD).

After release from China Nhất Linh returned to Vietnam in 1945 to become Foreign Minister in the first coalition government of the Democratic Republic of Vietnam. He was chief negotiator with the French in Dalat in April 1946 and was to have led the delegation to France. However, fearing Viet Minh assassination, he fled to Hong Kong and resided there 1946–1950. On his return to Vietnam, to the South, he avoided politics and concentrated on literary activities. This did not prevent the Ngo Dinh Diem regime of accusing him of involvement in the 1960 attempted coup. Nhat Linh denied this, and due to lack of evidence, the police did not seek to arrest Tam till 1963. Tam committed suicide by ingesting cyanide, leaving a death note stating "I also will kill myself as a warning to those people who are trampling on all freedom", the "also" probably referring to Thich Quang Duc, the monk who had self-immolated in protest against Diem's persecution of Buddhism a month earlier.

== Works ==
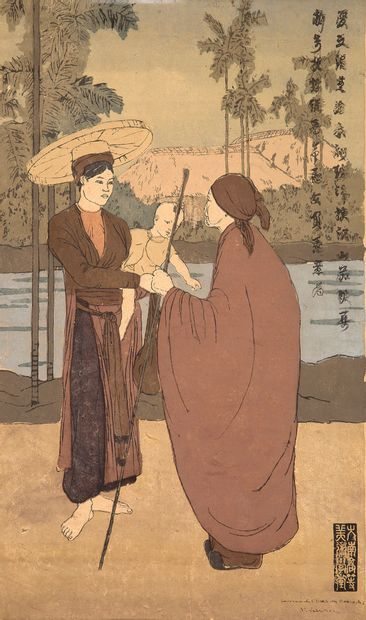
Painting "La Tonkinoise Et La Vieille Sage" by writer Nhất Linh

=== Novels ===
- Gánh hàng hoa (The Flower Seller) (with Khái Hưng, 1934)
- Đời mưa gió (The Stormy Life) (with Khái Hưng, 1934)
- Nắng thu (Autumn Sun) (1934)
- Đoạn tuyệt ( The End) (1934-1935)
- Lạnh lùng (Estrangement) (1935-1936)
- Đôi bạn (Two Friends) (1936-1937)
- Bướm trắng (White Butterfly) (1938-1939)
- Xóm cầu mới (New Bridge Hamlet) (1949-1957).
- Giòng sông Thanh Thủy (Blue River) (1960-1961).
- Ba người bộ hành (Three Pedestrians)
- Chi bộ hai người (The Cell of Two)
- Vọng quốc (Looking Back)

=== Stories ===
- Nho phong (Confucian Mannerism) (1924)
- Người quay tơ (The Weaver) (1926)
- Anh phải sống (You've Got to Live) (with Khái Hưng, 1932 - 1933)
- Hai buổi chiều vàng (Two Golden Afternoons) (1934-1937)
- Thế rồi một buổi chiều (It Happened One Afternoon) (1934-1937)
- Thương chồng (Feeling Sorry) (1961)

=== Essay ===
- Viết và đọc tiểu thuyết (Writing and Reading Novels) (1952-1961)

=== Travelogue ===
- Đi Tây (Going to the West) (1935)

=== Translations ===
- Wuthering Heights (made 1960, published 1974)

== Bibliography ==
- Strašáková, Mária (2011). Life and writings of Nguyễn Tuòng Tam (Thesis). hdl:20.500.11956/47084.
