= Thơ mới =

Literary movement in Vietnam

The New Poetry Movement (Vietnamese : Phong-trào Thơ-mới) was a literary movement in the 1930s colonial Vietnam, abandoning the stylized forms of Chinese-influenced poetry in Hán-Nôm for free verse in Latin-alphabet Quốc ngữ.

== History ==
The initial impetus was the result of exposure to French poetry, and failures in attempts to translate Verlaine or Baudelaire into the old Chinese-derived poetry forms. Since the 1950s, most poetry in Vietnam is written in free verse. The New Poetry Movement did not just depart from Sino-Vietnamese poetic forms and script, it also introduced more lyrical, emotional and individualistic expression. This poetic movement was contemporary with, and inter-related with, the French realism-inspired realist novels of the Tự Lực văn đoàn ("Self-Strengthening Literary Group").

Among the poets of the "New Poetry," Nguyễn Khắc Hiếu, better known by pen-name Tản Đà, (1889–1939) was one of the transitional poets between the old and "New." In terms of literary criticism, Hoài Thanh (1909–1982) was the first to make a systematic comparison of the Tho Moi movement with Western poetry.
