= Photography in Vietnam =

The tradition of photography started in the 19th century in Vietnam and has since then given rise to modern photography and photojournalism into the 20th century.

== Early history (19th century) ==
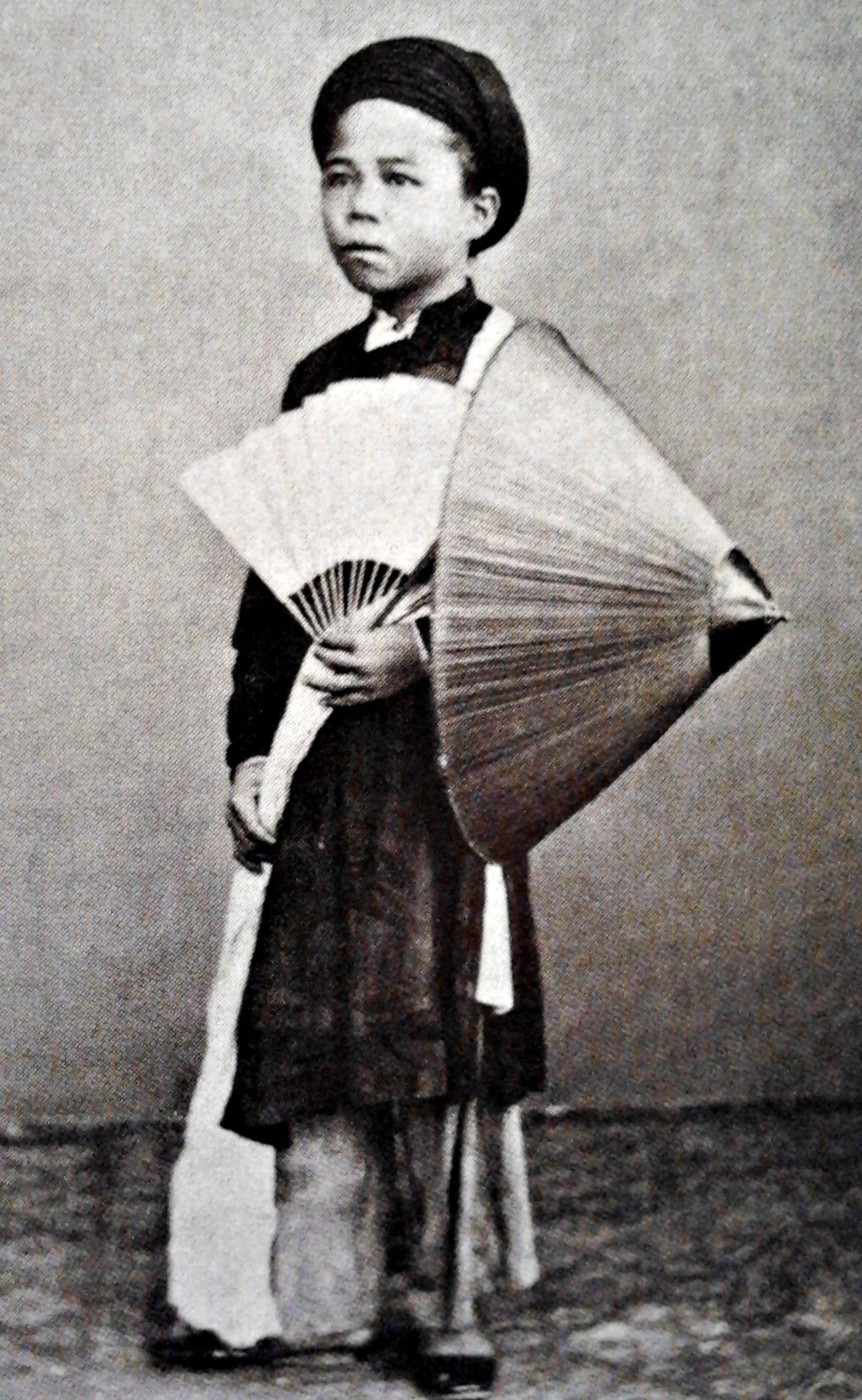
"Young Annamese" by Émile Gsell

Photographic technology was introduced to Vietnam by photographers from Europe and Hong Kong, who set up photography studios in Hanoi, Saigon, and other cities. The first photographs of Vietnam were taken by Jules Itier in Danang, in 1845. Early photographers used photography to document archaeological sites in the region, create portraits of colonial administrators and Vietnamese royalty, and capture everyday life in cities such as Saigon.

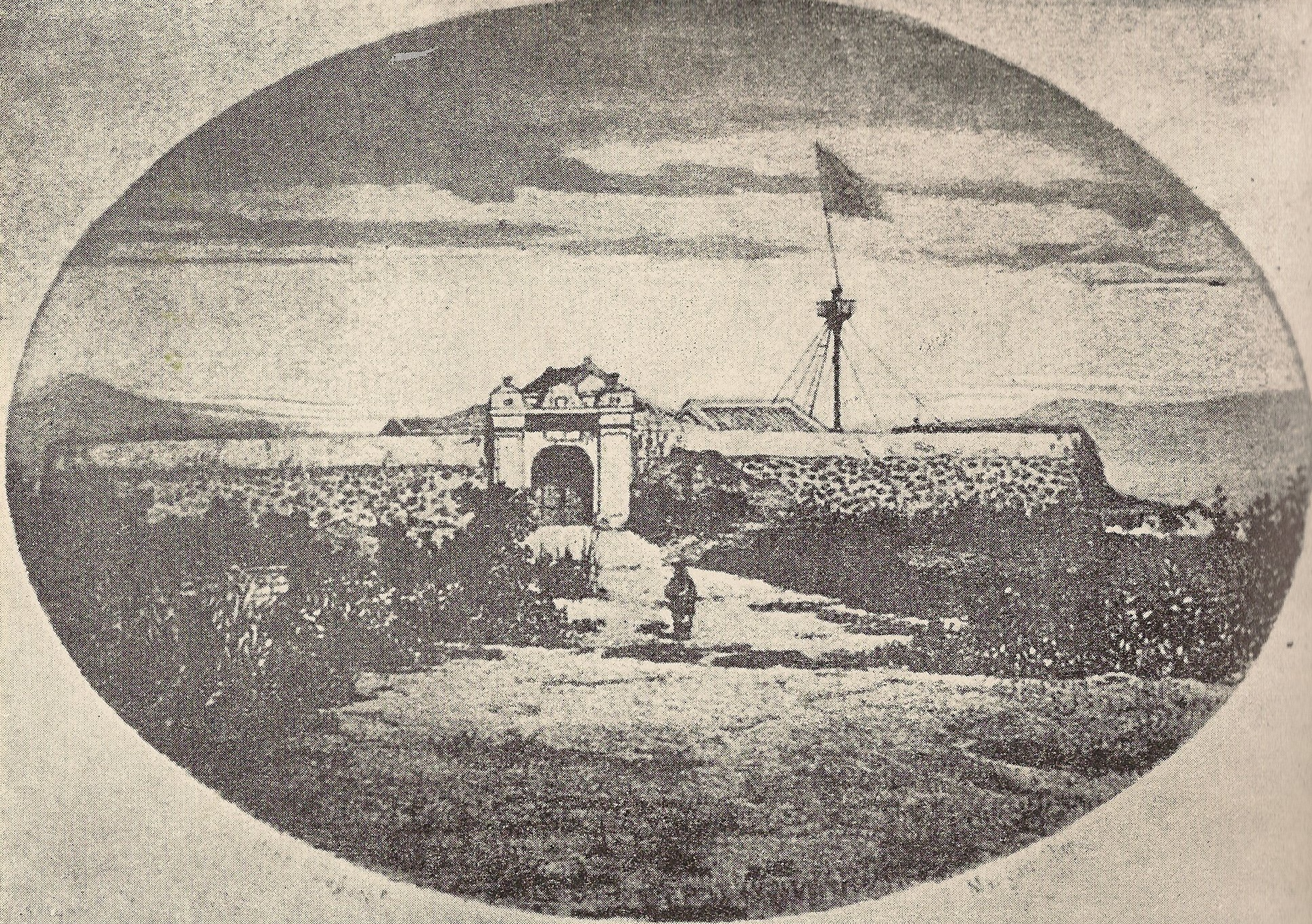
Early photograph of Fortress of Danang in 1845

The early commercial success and spread of photography can be attributed to the recognition of photography’s potential to spread information on Cochin China, Tonkin, and Annam by colonial administrators. Thus photographers were often tasked to record early military expeditions. For instance, Émile Gsell (1838–1879) was hired to photograph Angkor Wat in the Commission d'exploration du Mékong. Gsell would later be the first Frenchman to set-up a commercial photography studio in Saigon. Other notable French photography studio owners include Aurélien Pestel (1855–1897) whose photographs were exhibited at the 1894 World Exposition in Lyon and used to announce Indochina’s participation in the 1900 World’s Fair in Paris.

Another factor that contributed to the spread of photographic technology in Vietnam was the importance of family portraits, that would be used as part of Confucian practices of ancestor worship. Commercial photography studios not only served colonial administrators but also Mandarin elites. Notable photography studio owners include Pun Lun (繽綸) (1864–1900), a Chinese photographer who opened studios in Saigon, Fuzhou, and Singapore, as well as Nguyễn Đình Khánh (also known as Khánh Ký) (1884–1946) who owned a chain of commercial studios in Vietnam and was said to have employed Ho Chi Minh in his Paris studio.

=== Notable photographers ===
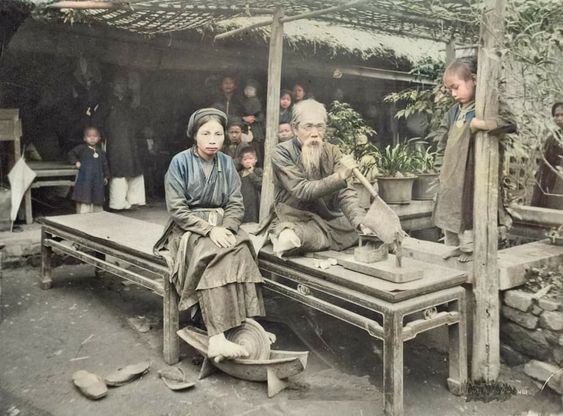
Early photograph of family in Tonkin, Vietnam

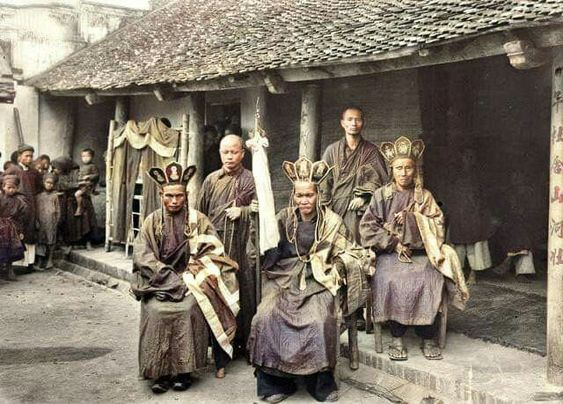
Early photograph of Buddhist monks in Hanoi

Early photographers active in Vietnam were:

- Octave de Bermond de Vaulx (1831–95)
- Jules-Félix Apollinaire Le Bas (1834–75)
- August Sachtler (?–1874)
- John Thomson
- Wilhelm Burger (1844–1920)
- Émile Gsell (1837–1869)

Commercial studios:

- Clément Gillet (fl. 1863–1867)
- Charles Parant (fl. 1864)
- Pun Lun (f. 1867–1872)
- Đặng Huy Trứ's Cam Hieu Duong Photography Shop (fl. 1869–1874)
- Pun Ky (f. 1870)
- Louis Auguste Gustave Jugant
- Noémie Ary-Jouanne (fl. 1877–1881)

== Rise of photojournalism (20th century) ==
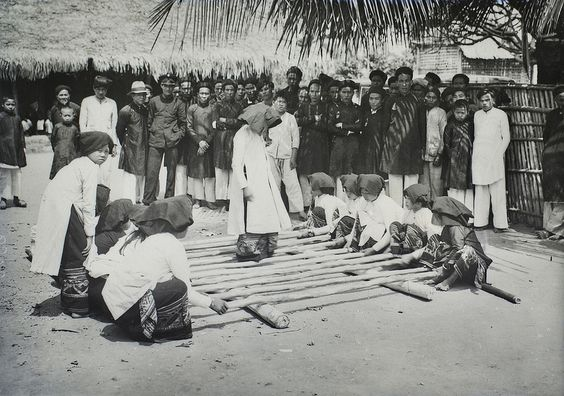
Photo taken in Nghệ An province (1920) of children playing a traditional

Commercial salon photography practices decreased with the onset of the First Indochina War (1946–1954) and Second Indochina War (1955–1975) and were displaced by representational photography practices such as photojournalism, that served to document historic events as well as disseminate images of war to an international audience.

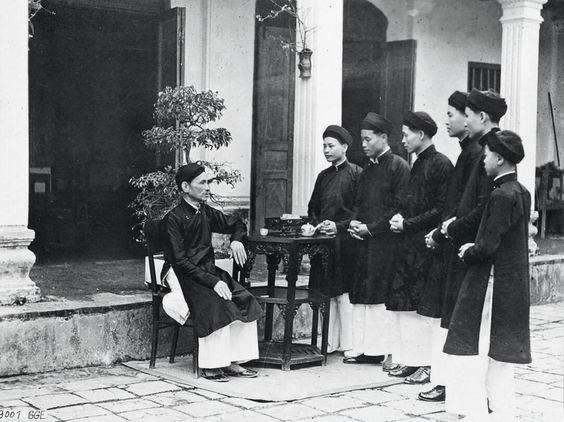
Children wish good luck to their father in Vietnamese lunar new year in Hanoi

The division of Vietnam along the 17th parallel after the 1954 Geneva Conference not only reflected the conflicting ideologies within Vietnamese Republicanism, but also the differences in the institutional structures of news agencies. The North Vietnamese government established the Vietnamese News Agency (VNA) in 1945, shortly after Ho Chi Minh’s proclamation of independence in Hanoi, as well as the Liberation News Agency (LNA) in the South along the Ho Chi Minh trail. VNA and LNA photographers were both soldiers and war correspondents, trained in military and photography techniques and answerable to the People’s Army of Vietnam. Similarly, the Republic of South Vietnam employed photographers in the Political Warfare department of the Army of the Republic of Vietnam (ARVN) and local newspapers that were headquartered in Saigon. However, Vietnamese photographers in the Republic of South Vietnam also had the option of freelancing for Western media outlets such as the Associated Press.

There are 72 recorded deaths of North Vietnamese VNA and LNA correspondents and 4 South Vietnamese war correspondents that worked for Western media outlets.

=== North Vietnam ===
Photographs submitted to the VNA or LNA were published in local newspapers as well as publications with circulation in Eastern European states, such as the Viet Nam Pictorial. Such photographs by North Vietnamese war correspondents tended to focus on the diverse aspect of people’s lives and experiences during the wartime, rather than violent scenes from the war as seen in the images created by war correspondents working for Western news agencies. Critics have argued that this difference exhibits the decreased importance of objectivity for North Vietnamese photojournalists and desire to exercise agency in capturing images that highlight the continuation of everyday life for the civilians. However recent critiques of photography from the era, most notably by Lâm Tấn Tài (1935–2001) who founded the LNA, points to the restrictions by the North Vietnamese government that forbade the shooting of ongoing battle scenes and wounded soldiers. Lâm also suggests that a sense of collective Vietnamese sentimentality resulted in the avoidance of capturing images of violence and instead a compulsion to create beautiful images.

Photojournalists came from a diverse range of backgrounds. For instance, Đinh Đăng Định (1920–2013) worked at a photography studio in his teenage years before joining the Viet Minh in 1936. He later became Ho Chi Minh’s personal photographer in 1945 and founded the Vietnamese Association of Photographic Artists (VAPA) with Lâm Tấn Tài in 1965. On the other hand, Lê Minh Trường (1930–2011) was declared unfit for combat and reassigned to be a photographer for the VNA. Other notable photographers include Đoàn Công Tính (b. 1943) who picked up photography while in the military academy, Vo An Khanh (b. 1936) who photographed the Mekong Delta, Mai Nam (b. 1931) who worked for the Hanoi Tien Phong (Pioneer) Newspaper, Nguyễn Khuyến who is the founder of the English-language daily Việt Nam News, and Trọng Thanh (1945 – 2000) who led the Viet Nam Pictorial and brought "an East-German and Russian influence to Vietnamese photography".

East-German and Russian influence on Vietnamese photography can also be seen in the sort of photographic equipment used by VNA and LNA correspondents. For instance, photographers were often issued a FED Soviet rangefinder or the East-German made Praktica.

=== South Vietnam ===
Less is known about the conditions and experiences of South Vietnamese war correspondents. A potential explanation is the absence of narratives of Southern Vietnamese in the history of the war, privileging the role of photographers from the North that mirrors the political narrative of the North liberating the South. Another explanation is the eclipsing of the contributions by South Vietnamese war correspondents by their Euro-American counterparts. Notable war correspondents with the ARVN were mostly established salon photographers who decided to use their craft to support the ideological position of the RV. This included Nguyễn Ngoc Hạnh (1927–2017) who was a Lieutenant Colonel and official war photographer for the ARVN, Nguyễn Mạnh Dân (b. 1925) who co-created the photo book "Viet Nam in Flames" with Nguyễn Ngoc Hạnh, and Nguyễn Văn Thông (b. 1925) who was an internationally-acclaimed salon photographer based in North Vietnam before moving to Saigon. Because of their affiliation with the South Vietnamese government, Nguyễn Ngoc Hạnh, Nguyễn Mạnh Dân, and Nguyễn Văn Thông were sent to reeducation camps after 1975.

Other notable war correspondents include South Vietnamese photographers who worked for Western media outlets such as Huỳnh Thanh Mỹ (1938 – 1965) who worked for the film crew of CBS before joining the Associated Press as a staff photographer, as well as his younger brother Huỳnh Công Út (known as Nick Ut) (b. 1951) who also worked for the Associated Press and won a Pulitzer Prize in 1973.

=== Reconciling the Past: exhibiting images by North and South Vietnamese photographers ===
New exhibitions of war photographs by both North and South Vietnamese correspondents suggest the creation of spaces for the recognition and remembrance of all photographers during the war. For instance, the Requiem – The Vietnam Collection exhibition in the War Remnants Museum in Ho Chi Minh on 10 March 2000 showcased images by war correspondents regardless of nationality, political orientation, or press affiliation. Organised in collaboration with the Indochina Requiem project, VNA, and VAPA to commemorate the twenty-fifth anniversary of end of the "anti-US resistance for national salvation", the exhibition reflected the efforts and desires to reconcile the past and potentially build collaborative relationships between Vietnam and the United States.

== Modern and Contemporary photography practices (21st century) ==
=== Before Đổi Mới (1975–1986) ===
Founded by Lâm Tấn Tài and Đinh Đăng Định in 1965, the Vietnamese Artistic Photographers Association (VAPA) organised early fine art photography exhibitions and was a main driver of debates on what characterised ‘artistic’ versus ‘documentary’ Vietnamese photography. Key qualities of fine art photography were beauty as well as the ability to capture the essence of everyday life, specifically of the countryside as it is the only constant in the rapidly changing landscape of the country. Prior to economic liberalisation through Đổi Mới, the government was the main patron of photography and the arts. As a result VAPA represents the orthodoxy of photography in Vietnam because of how its members were some of the most famous photographers and how the association was founded with the mission of using photography to support the revolution in line with socialist ideology.

=== After Đổi Mới (1986–present) ===
The cautious liberalisation of economic policies in Vietnam resulted in the diversification of sources of funding and greater artistic freedoms for photographers. Opportunities were also created for increased international exposure through exhibitions and fellowship programs which has catalysed developments in fine art and documentary photography.

Đổi Mới has also enabled the return of overseas Vietnamese (Việt Kiều) artists, who have become notable figures in the ecosystem of Contemporary art.

==== Fine art photography ====
To conduct research and disseminate information about Vietnamese photography, Lâm Tấn Tài founded the Photographic Research and Development Centre in 1997. The centre later established the first Department of Photography in Vietnam at the Ho Chi Minh City College of Art and Culture in 1998, resulting in the proliferation of photography departments in other universities across the country.

Ho Chi Minh City College of Art and Culture would bring together notable photographers of the time to train the next generation of Contemporary practitioners. For instance, Bùi Xuân Huy (b. 1953) and his students have risen to become notable figures in Contemporary Vietnamese photography. As one of the first South Vietnamese photographers sent abroad to study photography in the School of Visual Arts in New York by VAPA in 1996, Bùi Xuân Huy’s photographs are characterised by a sense of ambivalence and disorientation. Using a Holga, a non-professional camera known for its off-focus quality of images, Bùi created his Landscapes (1996 – ongoing) series that present diptychs of street scenes in Ho Chi Minh City. His Mannequins (1999 – ongoing) series utilises mannequins found outside clothing stores as a metaphor for the change that has engulfed the city and country. Critics have also suggested that the Mannequins series reflect the creative frustration and powerlessness of artists during this time, who "dress up but cannot be themselves."

Bùi’s students include Nguyen Thong Linh (b. 1973) who utilises photography to create image collections such as his Motorcycles (2006 – 2007) series that documents the daily routines of Xe Ôm drivers and the changing cityscape, as well as Bui Huu Phuoc (b. 1976) whose Identity Cards (2003 –2004) series is critique of the ability of photography to capture the likeness of its subject.

==== Documentary photography ====
Documentary photographers experience the potential for self-censorship, especially for those whose works might reveal the underbelly of Vietnamese society. Nonetheless, documentary photography practices continue to thrive in Contemporary Vietnam.

Notable photographers include Đoàn Đức Minh (b. 1957) who captures portraits of victims of Agent Orange in his Suffering and Smiles (2000 – 2005) series to showcase the desire of victims to struggle for their lives and counter images by foreign photographers who portray them as sad, Nguyễn Hoài Linh (b. 1967) whose The Red River Delta (1995 – 2005) series is an investigation of the region his family was displaced from, Maika Elan (born Nguyễn Thanh Hải) (b. 1986) who depicts the lives of homosexual couples in The Pink Choice (2011 – 2012), and Lam Hieu Thuan (b. 1973) who was a student of Bùi and documents the changes in the architectural landscape of Ho Chi Minh city since Đổi Mới in Apartments (2005 – 2006).

==== Việt Kiều artists ====
In addition to reimagining the genres of photography, Contemporary art practices particularly by Việt Kiều artists have used found images as a medium. Perhaps the most well-known practice is by Dinh Q. Lê (b. 1968), who moved back to Vietnam in 1996 from California. His work such as From Vietnam to Hollywood (2003 – 2005) weaves together documentary photography images from the Second Indochina War into three-dimensional tapestries. Another major Vietnamese-born diaspora photographer, An-My Lê, has used landscape photography to examine war, displacement, and military representation; her series Viêt Nam (1994–1998) followed her 1994 return to Vietnam, while Small Wars (1999–2002) photographed and participated in Vietnam War reenactments in the United States. Dinh along with other Việt Kiều artists such as Tiffany Chung, Tuan Andrew Nguyen, and Phunam founded Sàn Art in 2007. As a nonprofit Contemporary art library and exhibition space in Ho Chi Minh city, Sàn Art seeks to create opportunities for discourse around art-making practices and has become an important part of the Vietnamese arts ecosystem. Another notable Việt Kiều photographer is Richard Streitmatter-Tran (b. 1972), whose works critique the use of Agent Orange by American troops. The Loudest Sound (2005) features diptychs of Vietnamese people in their usual attire and then in orange suits similar to the suits worn by prisoners in Abu Ghraib prison.

Friction exists between Việt Kiều and local-born artists, who have criticised their return to Vietnam as being self-motivated, in search for more reference materials to work with.
