= Life of a Flower =

1953 Vietnamese film

- Vietnamese: Kiếp hoa
- Hán-Nôm: 刧花
- Directed by: Claude Bernard
- Screenplay by: Trần Viết Long
- Based on: 1940 film Waterloo Bridge; New Cry From the Broken Heart
- Produced by: Trần Viết Long
- Starring: Kim Chung; Kim Xuân; Trần Quang Tứ; Ngọc Toàn; Tuấn Sửu
- Cinematography: Raymond Chao
- Music by: Trần Viết Long; Phạm Duy
- Production company: Kim Chung Films
- Distributed by: Kim Chung Films; Vietnam National Institute of Film
- Release date: 1954
- Running time: 107 minutes
- Countries: Vietnam; China; France
- Languages: Vietnamese; Chinese; French

Life of a Flower (Vietnamese: Kiếp hoa, French: La vie d'un fleur, Chinese: 花的生命) is a 1953 Vietnamese 16mm romance film directed by Trần Viết Long in his art name Trần Lang.

== Production ==
Life of a Flower was the first sound film which Vietnamese men has produced. Location is Hanoi (84th Nguyen Du Street) and Hong Kong in 1953.

=== Art ===
- Studio : Kim Chung Films (Kim-Chung Điện-ảnh Công-ti)
- Director : Claude Bernard
- Producer and writer : Trần Viết Long (Manager Long)
- Camera : Raymond Chao

=== Music ===
- My village (Chung Quân)
- Echoes of memories (Nguyễn Văn Tý), singing by Kim Chung and Kim Xuân
- Autumn rain drops (Đặng Thế Phong)
- The guitar left behind (Phạm Duy)

=== Cast ===
- Kim Chung ... Ngọc Lan
- Kim Xuân ... Ngọc Thủy
- Trần Quang Tứ ... Thiện
- Ngọc Toàn ... Nhạc
- Tuấn Sửu ... Tam
- Nhã Ái ... Lan and Thủy's mother
- Tiền Phong ... Thiện's father
- Tiêu Lang ... A man buys cigarettes

with others actors from Kim Chung Performing Arts (Đoàn Cải-lương Kim-Chung).

== See also ==
- Waterloo Bridge (1940 film)
