= 1977 Vlog =

Vietnamese YouTuber group of literary topics

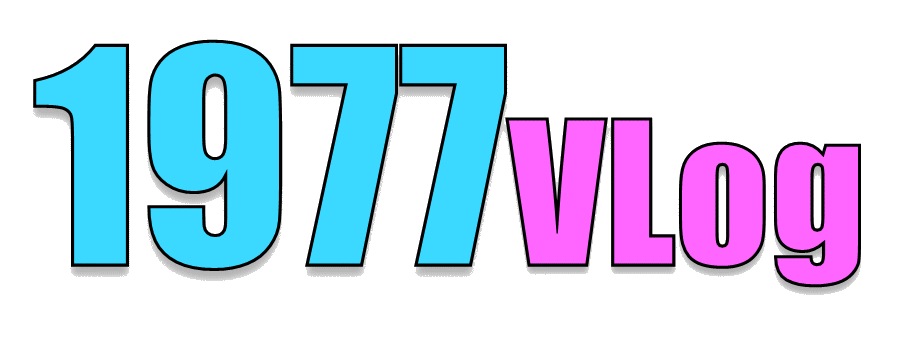
- Logo of 1977 Vlog's channel
- Born: Nguyễn Việt Anh June 20, 1992 (age 34); Nguyễn Trung Anh June 20, 1992 (age 34); Nguyễn Văn Tân October 22, 2001 (age 24) Hanoi, Vietnam
- Education: Thang Long University
- Occupation: YouTuber

YouTube information
- Channel: 1977 Vlog
- Years active: 2019–present
- Genres: Vlog; Entertainment
- Subscribers: 2.41 million
- Views: 168.2 million
- Last updated: February 3, 2026

1977 Vlog is the name of a YouTube channel created by a group of video creators founded on August 30, 2019. Based on popular literary works, 1977 Vlog produces videos with a fresh, satirical perspective and content that follows youth trends. Their record is achieving a YouTube Silver Play Button after only two videos and a YouTube Gold Play Button after only four videos, each no longer than six minutes.

== Original ==
The creators of 1977 Vlog were originally twin brothers Nguyễn Trung Anh (older brother) and Nguyễn Việt Anh (younger brother). Growing up in a family with parents in the military, both brothers loved comedy from a young age. After graduating from high school, they decided to apply to the University of Theatre and Film but were unsuccessful, instead enrolling in the Finance and Banking Department at Thăng Long University. After graduation, wanting to continue pursuing their passion, the two brothers created a YouTube channel and filmed and performed their own comedy clips.

Regarding the naming of 1977 Vlog, Việt Anh explained that he and Trung Anh both love making films in the old-fashioned style, so they wanted to choose a year with the same number and chose 1977. 1977 signifies one dream, nine years of pursuit, and two people who no longer fail (the number 7). Therefore, the group took its name from the number 1977. The group's official slogan is: "We're simply crazy." Trung Anh further explained: "Crazy here means crazy about honesty, crazy about literature, crazy about the good meanings in life, not crazy about drugs."

== Member ==
=== Main role ===
- Twin brothers Nguyễn Trung Anh and Nguyễn Việt Anh (born June 20, 1992)
- Nguyễn Văn Tân, cousin of Nguyễn Trung Anh and Nguyễn Việt Anh (born October 22, 2001).

=== Subcontracting ===
- Nguyễn Năng Hải (born 1992);
- Nguyễn Công Hiếu (born 1992);
- Đinh Hữu Chiêm (born 1993).

== Content and methods for creating vlogs ==
On average, the group only takes a week to produce a video, with filming taking 3–4 days and voiceovers 3 days. The total time, including scriptwriting, is about 10 days per video. After that, they take a 5–7 day break to read audience feedback before planning new clips. A distinctive feature of 1977 Vlog is its black and white video style and slow pace.

The content of 1977 Vlog's videos is inspired by famous Vietnamese literary works. The members use tablets to film the videos. Due to a worn-out battery, the filming process has to be divided into multiple takes. The editing equipment is a desktop computer. The scenes only feature two characters and one cameraman because the tablets lack a tripod. Furthermore, no other supporting equipment is used for filming. Trung Anh stated that the group creates vlogs with the aim of criticizing negative aspects and highlighting positive aspects of life.

Each clip costs the group approximately 200,000 to 400,000 VND for costumes. As of mid-October, the group had received around 300 USD from YouTube. According to Viet Anh, the group has no plans to accept advertising, a gesture of gratitude for the support from their audience. Regarding role casting, Việt Anh usually plays villains due to his scarred face, Trung Anh plays kind-hearted characters, and Nguyễn Văn Tân plays female characters, as his face is suitable for transforming into female characters through makeup.

The current and future direction of 1977 Vlog is to continue using classic literary works to reflect pressing social issues. The group also plans to expand other vlog series to reach a wider audience. They also intend to try their hand at other topics besides clips based on classic literature. For example, a series using visuals similar to color films from the 2003-2005 period, or even foreign works if they fit the content they want to convey. The group also plans to write their own scripts, not based on classic literature.

== Acceptance ==
Appearing with their first video titled "Spoiling the New Movie: Cậu Vàng" the group quickly garnered 8.3 million views in just two months. The video originated from a public controversy surrounding the use of a Japanese Shiba Inu dog to play Cậu Vàng. The 1977 Vlog group then conceived the idea of creating a humorous, unscripted video as a memento. This first video marked their rise to fame.

After only two videos, 1977 Vlog received the YouTube Silver Play Button. As of October 21, the group had over 400,000 subscribers. After a total of four videos, they officially received the Gold Play Button in mid-November 2019.

These videos were well received by the public due to their creativity and uniqueness. The video clips feature a black and white color palette reminiscent of Vietnamese cinema before 1975, similar to old television screens, with a slow pace, sometimes blurred images, and occasional static. The voiceovers also utilize the style of old films; the group members had previously practiced the slow, deliberate speaking style of those eras. The clips themselves use almost no special effects, except for the black and white transition. Some dialogue segments don't match the lip movements because they changed the lines to better ones during the re-editing process.

The acting is natural and moderately playful, creating a warm and comfortable feeling. The costumes in the vlogs are also carefully chosen to suit the storyline. The setting is a rustic, rural area by the river near their home. The highlight of the vlogs is their creative use of folk culture, combined with contemporary elements and satirical commentary on pressing social issues. Many of the lines in the vlogs have been well received by viewers.

However, some argue that 1977 Vlog's vlogs have been distorting young people's views on classic literary works and characters from many generations, and damaging the value of literary works and authors.

== Video list ==
List updated as of February 13, 2024, views and likes updated as of March 22, 2022

Number	Title	Release date	YouTube views	Number of likes	Note
1	Spoil phim mới Cậu Vàng cực mạnh (Cậu Vàng Trong Vai Chó Shiba)	August 30, 2019	15.200.000+	280.000+	
2	Hồi ký của một dân chơi - Chí Phèo	September 14, 2019	15.000.000+	240.000+	
3	Vợ chồng A Phủ Parody - Vòng Xoáy Của Bạc	September 30, 2019	14.800.000+	300.000+	
4	Chị Dậu Parody - Kỷ Nguyên Hắc Ám	October 21, 2019	22.000.000+	490.000+	
5	Sống Mòòn – Giáo Án Lửa Thiêng	November 20, 2019	11.500.000+	419.000+	
6	Vợ nhặt – Kẻ Đi Tìm Tưong Lai	January 10, 2020	13.600.000+	442.000+	
7	Chiếc lá cuối cùng - Quyền Nǎng Đất Mẹ	February 29, 2020	10.600.000+	448.000+	
8	Hai Đứa Trẻ – Hiệp Định Hồ Gưom	May 27, 2020	7.900.000+	317.000+	
9	Chiếc Thuyền Ngoài Xa - Ngôi Báu Cát	June 12, 2020	8.500.000+	320.000+	
10	Đời thừa – Bên rìa hạnh phúc	August 9, 2020	8.700.000+	294.000+	
11	Rừng Xà Nu - Lời Trăn Trối Cuối Cùng	November 27, 2020	4.400.000+	182.000+	
12	Sonate Tình Yêu - Official MV (Thu Âm Truớc 1977)	December 17, 2020	2.400.000+	120.000+	
13	Ngáo Ngơ Ký Sự - Tập 1 - Tình Yêu	February 14, 2021	1.500.000+	55.000+	
14	Số Đỏ Parody – Vua Bịp Bọm	May 17, 2021	4.000.000+	139.000+	
15	Trǎng Sáng – Những Mảnh Đòi Lấp Lánh – Cú Chốt 1	December 7, 2021	2.400.000+	98.000+	
16	Hài Tết - 12 Con Giáp - Ngâm Dần Nhậm Chức	January 30, 2022	1.939.491+	60.000+	
17	Ông Lão Đánh Cá Và Con Cá Vàng – Khi Lòng Tham Rên Rỉ	July 2, 2022	1.752.425+	61.000+	
18	Hài Tết 2023 - 12 Con Rác - Quý Mão Dọn Nhà	January 20, 2023	-	-	
19	Romeo Và Juliet – Nguời Giữ Tình Yêu	April 15, 2023	-	-	
20	Xuân Đan – Thế Kỷ Trổng – Good Boy Đại Chiến	October 12, 2023	-	-	
21	Kiều Genz - Tập 1 - Kiều	December 2, 2023	-	-	
22	Kiều Genz – Tập 2 – Thúc Sinh	December 9, 2023	-	-	
23	Kiều Genz – Tập 3 – Hoạn Thư	December 16, 2023	-	-	
24	Kiều Genz – Tập 4 – Từ Hải	December 16, 2023	-	-	

== Awards and nominations ==
Year	Award Ceremony	Category	Nominations	Results
2019	METUB WebTV Asia Awards	Promising Creator	Self	Won
2019	WeChoice Awards	Comedy/Parody of the Year	Chị Dậu Parody - Kỷ Nguyên Hắc Ám	Won
2019	WeChoice Awards	Top 5 Inspirational Ambassadors	Self	Won
2019	WeChoice Awards	Top 10 Inspirational Figures	Self	Won
2019	WeChoice Awards	Hot Content Creator	Self	Nominated

== Movie ==
1977 Vlog has officially announced its debut project titled "Cao Thủ Bi-A Đại Chiến Với Quỷ Dữ".
