= Đặng Văn Ngữ =

Vietnamese medical doctor and intellectual

Portrait of Đặng Văn Ngữ

Đặng Văn Ngữ (1910–1967) was a Vietnamese medical doctor and intellectual.

== Biography ==
Ngu was born on the outskirts of Huế on April 4, 1910. In 1937, he graduated from the Indochina Medical University. He became an assistant to the French physician and professor Henry Galliard, dean of the Department of Bacteriology at the school. In 1942, he directed the bacteriology lab and completed 19 research topics. In 1943, he studied in Japan, and became the President of the Patriotic Vietnamese Society in Japan in 1945. In 1949, he returned to Vietnam and joined the Viet Minh resisting against French rule, becoming the lead lecturer in bacteriology in the Medical School at Chiêm Hóa. During his time in the Viet Minh, he successfully researched a method to manufacture penicillin. In 1955, he founded the Vietnamese Institute of Malaria - Bacteriology and Insects, and became its first director. During the Vietnam War, he researched ways to prevent and treat malaria in Vietnam. On April 1, 1967, he was killed in an American bombing in the Annamite Range while in Thừa Thiên–Huế Province while researching malaria.

He was awarded the Ho Chi Minh Prize for his contributions to medical research.
