= Hồ Chí Minh Prize =

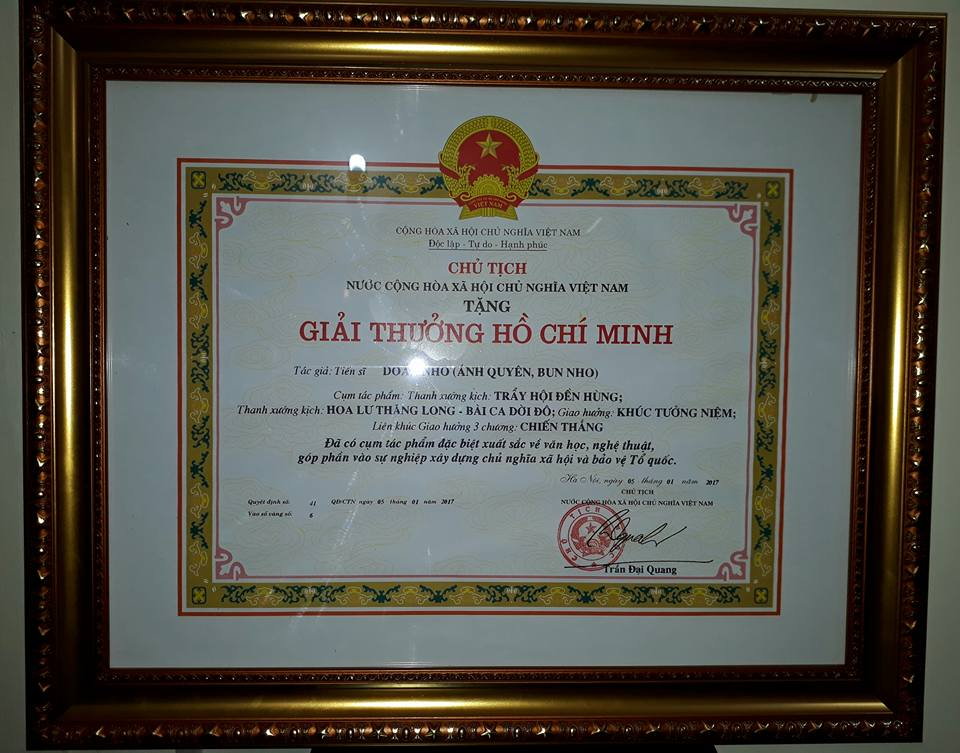
Hồ Chí Minh Prize awarded to musician, Dr. Doãn Nho

The Hồ Chí Minh Prize (Vietnamese: Giải thưởng Hồ Chí Minh) is an honorary award given by the government of Vietnam in recognition of cultural and/or scientific achievement. The prize was established by decree in 1981, and has been awarded in 1996, 2000, 2005 and 2012, often posthumously. The prize is named for Ho Chi Minh, who was chairman and founder of the Workers' Party of Vietnam, that is considered one of the highest honors bestowed by Vietnam.

== Recipients ==
=== 1996 ===
Social sciences

- Nguyễn Khánh Toàn (vi)
- Trần Huy Liệu (vi)
- Đặng Thai Mai (vi)
- Trần Văn Giàu (vi)
- Vũ Khiêu (vi)
- Cao Xuân Huy (vi)
- Hồ Tôn Trinh (vi)
- Đinh Gia Khánh (vi)

Medicine

- Hồ Đắc Di (vi)
- Nguyễn Văn Hưởng (vi)
- Đặng Vũ Hỷ (vi)
- Phạm Ngọc Thạch (vi)
- Tôn Thất Tùng (vi)
- Đỗ Xuân Hợp (vi)
- Đặng Văn Ngữ
- Đặng Văn Chung
- Trần Hữu Tước (vi)
- Nguyễn Xuân Nguyên (vi)
- Trương Công Quyền (vi)
- Đỗ Tất Lợi (vi)
- Hoàng Tích Mịnh

Natural sciences and engineering

- Military Institute of Engineering
- Trần Đại Nghĩa (vi)
- Tạ Quang Bửu (vi)
- Nguyễn Xiển (vi)
- Lê Văn Thiêm, math
- Hoàng Tuỵ, math
- Đào Văn Tiến (vi)
- Nguyễn Văn Hiệu (vi)

Agriculture

- Lương Định Của (vi)
- Bùi Huy Đáp (vi)

Literature

- Nam Cao
- Huy Cận
- Xuân Diệu
- Tố Hữu
- Nguyên Hồng (vi)
- Nguyễn Công Hoan (vi)
- Nguyễn Tuân
- Nguyễn Đình Thi
- Ngô Tất Tố (vi)
- Chế Lan Viên
- Hải Triều
- Nguyễn Huy Tưởng
- Tế Hanh (vi)
- Tô Hoài

Fine arts

- Tô Ngọc Vân
- Nguyễn Sáng
- Nguyễn Tư Nghiêm (vi)
- Trần Văn Cẩn (vi)
- Bùi Xuân Phái
- Nguyễn Đỗ Cung (vi)
- Nguyễn Phan Chánh (vi)
- Diệp Minh Châu (vi)

Photography

- Lâm Hồng Long (vi)
- Vũ Năng An (vi)
- Võ An Ninh (vi)
- Nguyễn Bá Khoản (vi)

Theatre

- Học Phi (Chu Văn Tập) (vi)
- Trần Hữu Trang (vi)
- Tống Phước Phổ (vi)
- Đào Hồng Cẩm (Cao Mạnh Tùng) (vi)
- Tào Mạt (Nguyễn Duy Thục) (vi)

Folk Arts

- Vũ Ngọc Phan (vi)
- Nguyễn Đổng Chi (vi)
- Cao Huy Đỉnh (vi)

Music

- Đỗ Nhuận
- Lưu Hữu Phước
- Văn Cao
- Hoàng Việt
- Nguyễn Xuân Khoát

Dance

- Nguyễn Đình Thái Ly (vi)

Film

- Nguyễn Hồng Sến (vi)

Architecture

- Nguyễn Cao Luyện (vi)
- Hoàng Như Tiếp
- Huỳnh Tấn Phát

=== 2000 ===
Sciences

- Various awards

Literature

- Bùi Đức Ái (Anh Đức) (vi)
- Nguyễn Minh Châu (vi)
- Nguyễn Khải (vi)
- Nguyễn Bính (vi)
- Nguyễn Văn Bổng (vi)
- Lưu Trọng Lư
- Nguyễn Quang Sáng (Nguyễn Sáng) (vi)
- Hoài Thanh (vi)
- Nguyễn Thi (Nguyễn Ngọc Tấn) (vi)
- Lê Khâm (Phan Tứ) (vi)
- Nông Quốc Chấn (vi)
- Trần Đình Đắc (Chính Hữu) (vi)
- Hồ Trọng Hiếu (Tú Mỡ) (vi)
- Hà Nghệ (Hà Xuân Trường) (vi)
- Nguyễn Đức Từ Chi (vi)

Fine Arts

- Nguyễn Tiến Chung
- Huỳnh Văn Gấm
- Dương Bích Liên (vi)
- Hoàng Tích Chù (vi)
- Nguyễn Văn Tỵ (vi)
- Nguyễn Hải
- Nguyễn Khang (vi)
- Nguyễn Sỹ Ngọc
- Nguyễn Thị Kim (vi)
- Lê Quốc Lộc

Photography

- Đinh Đăng Định (vi)

Theatre

- Thế Lữ (vi)
- Lộng Chương (vi)
- Lưu Quang Vũ (vi)

Music

- Huy Du
- Xuân Hồng
- Phan Huỳnh Điểu
- Nguyễn Văn Tý
- Nguyễn Đức Toàn
- Hoàng Vân
- Nguyễn Văn Thương
- Hoàng Hiệp
- Trần Hoàn

=== 2005 ===
Sciences

- Khoa học xã hội (2 giải)[sửa]

Literature

- Anh Thơ (writer) (vi)

Theatre

- Nguyễn Đình Quang (vi)

Film

- Đặng Nhật Minh
- Nguyễn Hải Ninh
- Bùi Đình Hạc (vi)

=== 2012 ===
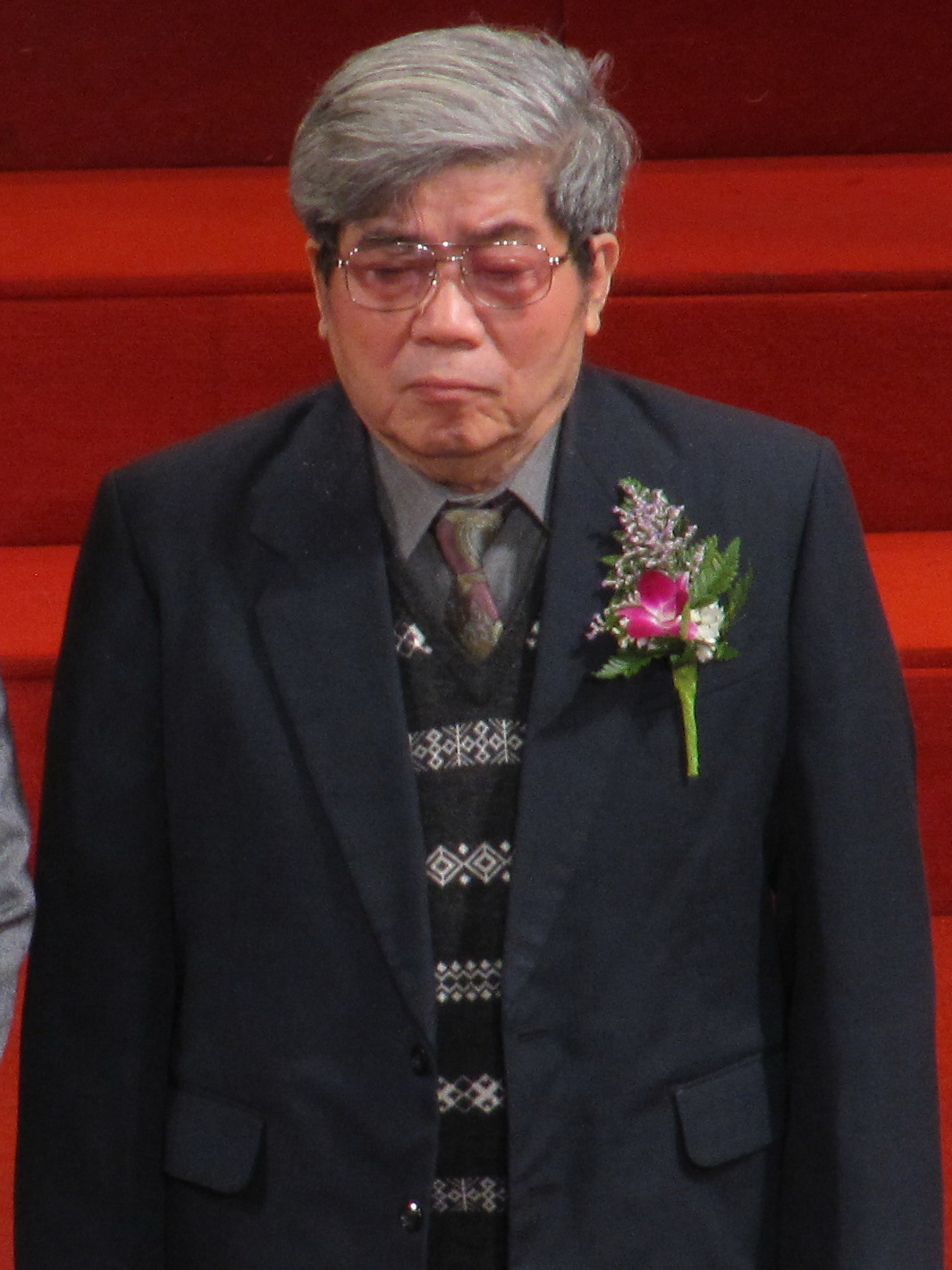
Mr. Hà Minh Đức at the 2012 Hồ Chí Minh Prize ceremony

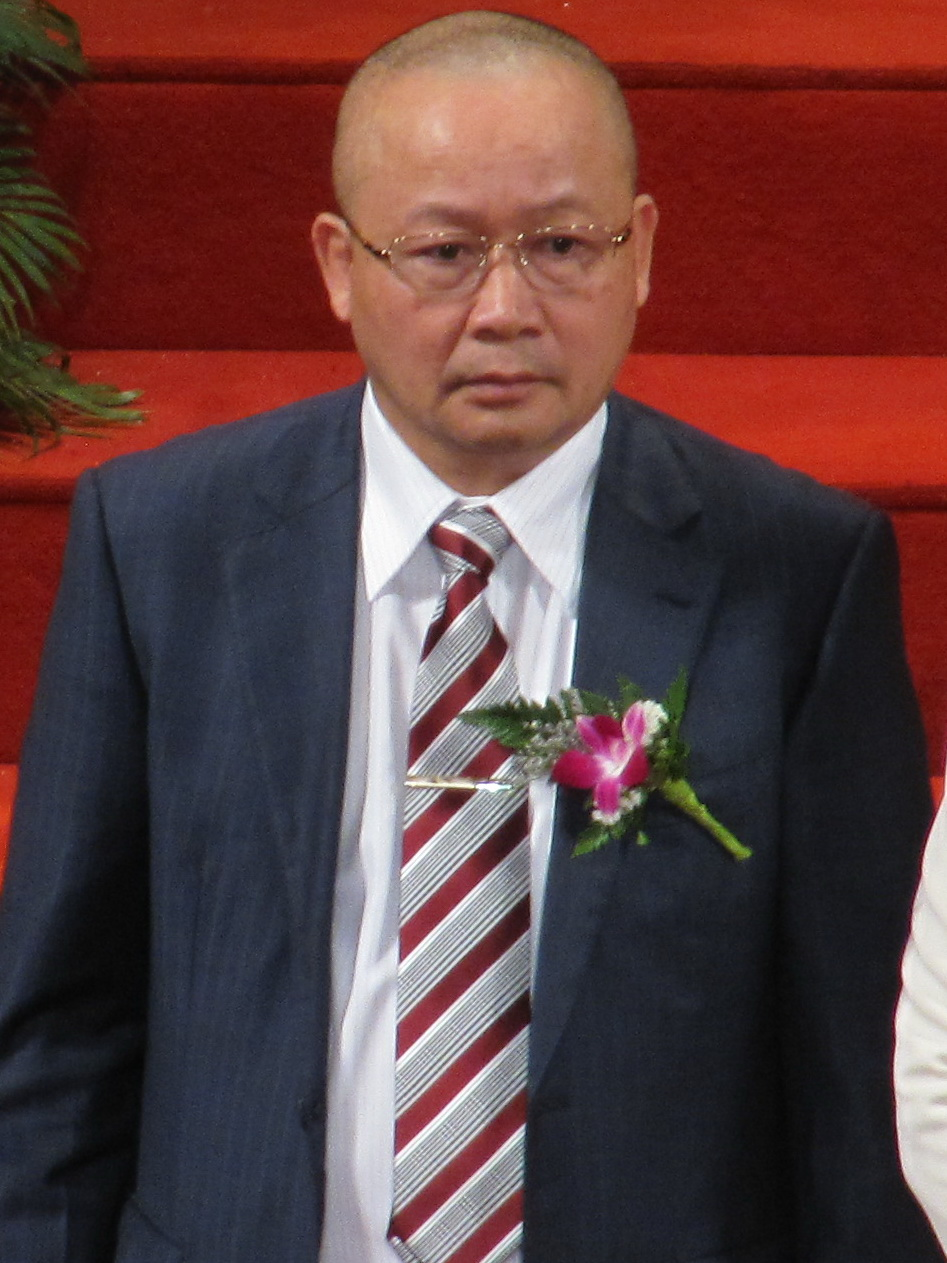
Mr. Nguyễn Tăng Cường at the 2012 Hồ Chí Minh Prize ceremony

Social sciences

- Trần Quốc Vượng (vi)
- Hà Minh Đức (vi)
- Lê Trí Viễn (vi)
- Bùi Văn Ba

Natural Sciences

- 49 prizes shared
- Lê Bá Thảo
- Nguyễn Tăng Cường (vi)
- Trần Quang Ngọc

Medicine

- 8 prizes shared

Music

- Văn Chung
- Phạm Tuyên

Theatre

- Nguyễn Đình Nghi (vi)
- Dương Ngọc Đức
- Sỹ Tiến

Literature

- Phạm Tiến Duật (vi)
- Hoàng Tích Chỉ (vi)
- Ma Văn Kháng (vi)
- Hữu Thỉnh (vi)
- Hồ Phương (vi)
- Đỗ Chu (vi)
- Lê Văn Thảo (vi)

== See also ==
- List of general science and technology awards
