= Đặng Huy Trứ =

Đặng Huy Trứ 鄧輝𤏸
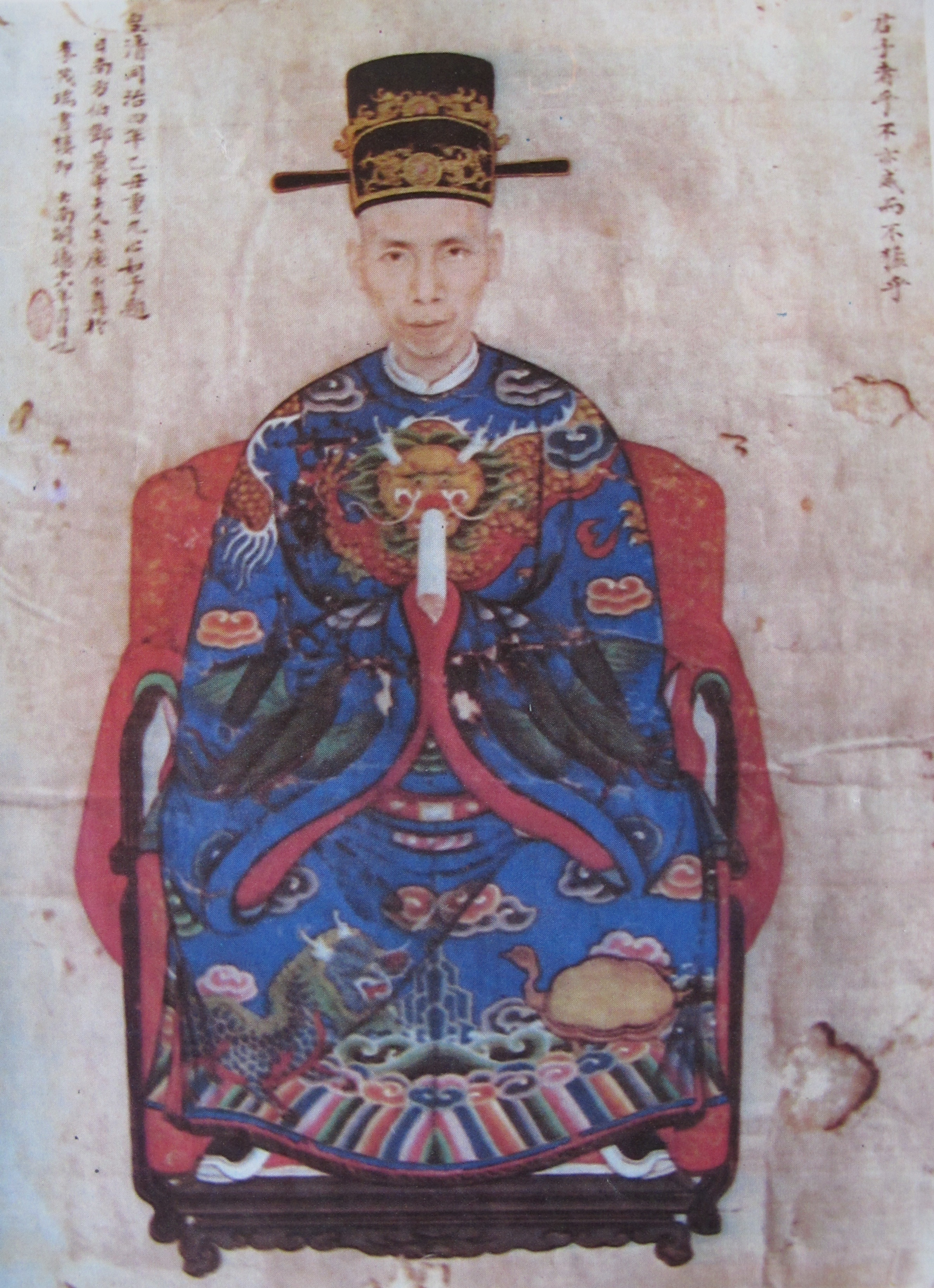
- Portrait of Đặng Huy Trứ at Guangdong, 1865
- In office 1855–1874

Personal details
- Born: 16 May 1825 Thanh Lương village, Hương Trà district, Thừa Thiên prefect, Vietnam
- Died: 7 August 1874 (aged 49) Đồn Vàng, Chợ Bến, Cao Lăng village, Mỹ Đức canton, Hà Đông province, Vietnam
- Parent(s): Đặng Văn Trọng (father); Trần Thị Minh (mother)
- Occupation: Politician, poet, writer

Đặng Huy Trứ (chữ Hán: 鄧輝𤏸; 1825–1874) was a Vietnamese official of the Nguyễn dynasty.

== Biography ==
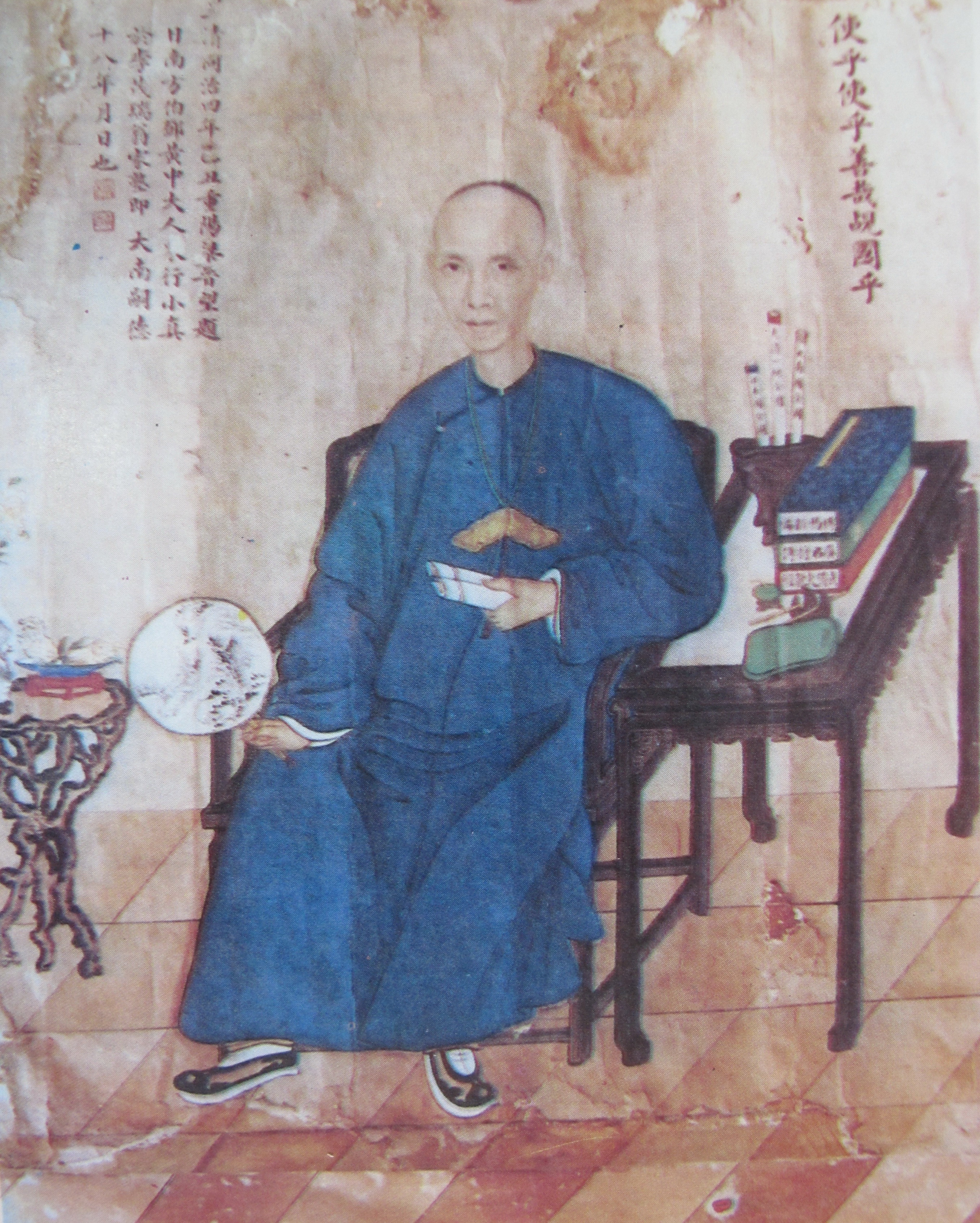
Đặng Huy Trứ wears áo ngũ thân

Đặng Huy Trứ has a courtesy name Hoàng Trung (黃中), pseudonym Vọng Tân (望津) or Tỉnh Trai (醒齋), nick name Sir Bố Đặng (翁布鄧 / Ông Bố Đặng) or Sir Bố Trứ (翁布𤏸 / Ông Bố Trứ). He was born on 16 May 1825 at Thanh Lương village, Hương Trà district, Thừa Thiên prefect but his ancestors from Bác Vọng village, Quảng Điền district.

== Works ==
- Đặng Hoàng Trung ngũ giới pháp thiếp (鄧黄中五戒法帖)
- Đặng Hoàng Trung thi sao (鄧黄中詩抄)
- Đặng Hoàng Trung văn sao (鄧黄中文抄)
- Đặng Dịch Trai ngôn hành lục (鄧惕齋言行錄)
- Việt sử thánh huấn diễn nghĩa (越史聖訓演義)
- Ngũ giới diễn ca (五戒演歌)
- Sách học vấn tân (策學門津)
- Tứ giới thi (四戒詩)
- Tứ thập bát hiếu thi họa toàn tập (四十八孝詩畫全集)
- Tự trị yên đổ phương thư (自治煙賭方書)
- Bách duyệt tập (柏悅集)
- Nhĩ Hoàng di ái lục (珥潢遺愛錄)
- Tứ thư văn tuyển (四書文選)
- Từ thụ yếu quy (辭受要規)
- Dương Đình phú lược (陽亭賦略)
- Nhị vị tập (二味集)
- Thanh Khang Hi ngự đề canh chức đồ phó bản (清康熙御題耕織圖副本)
- Trương Quảng Khê thi văn (張廣溪詩文)

== See also ==
- Lý Văn Phức
- Hoàng Kế Viêm
