= Nguyễn Văn Thương =

Vietnamese composer

Nguyễn Văn Thương (Huế 1919-2002) was a Vietnamese composer. He was a recipient of the Hồ Chí Minh Prize in 2000.

== Works ==
=== Songs ===
- Bài ca trên núi
- Bình Trị Thiên khói lửa
- Bướm hoa
- Đêm đông
- Người đẹp vườn xuân
- Trên sông Hương
- Tổ quốc tôi chưa đẹp thế bao giờ
- Dân ta đánh giặc anh hùng
- Gửi Huế giải phóng
- Bài ca trong hang đá
- Dâng người tiếng hát mùa xuân
