= Diệp Minh Châu =

Vietnamese painter and sculptor

Diệp Minh Châu (10 February 1919 - 12 July 2002) was a Vietnamese painter and sculptor. He studied at the University of Hanoi. He was awarded the Ho Chi Minh Prize for fine art in 1996.

== Biography and Career ==
=== Early life ===
He was born in 1919 in Chieu Village, Nhon Thanh Commune, Giồng Trôm District, Bến Tre Province, which is now part of the city of Bến Tre, in a farming family. From an early age, he was passionate about drawing, becoming known for his artistic talent, and his friends nicknamed him "Chau 'the artist'". At the age of 15, he returned home to help his family and met Hoàng Tuyển, the author of the painting Four Seasons, while still maintaining his passion for art. He moved to Hanoi to attend a preparatory class at the Indochina School of Fine Arts, working part-time to support himself. After one year of study, he returned to his hometown.

In 1940, he passed the entrance exam to the École des Beaux-Arts de l'Indochine (Indochina College of Fine Arts) with the highest marks. To pay for tuition, he continued to work part-time painting stage backdrops for theatrical troupes in Hanoi. In 1942, some of his paintings such as Autumn Moon, Longing, Fragrance and Colors attracted the attention of the artistic community. He won awards at the National Fine Arts Exhibition, including a bronze medal for his painting Van Mieu (1942) and a silver medal for his silk painting Prayer (1943). He participated in the patriotic student movement, advocating for the promotion of the Vietnamese national language and designed covers for patriotic songs by Lưu Hữu Phước, as well as creating set designs for performances of the Hanoi Student Union's drama troupe. However, he did not graduate from the Fine Arts School due to the Japanese coup that overthrew the French. He returned home, continued to paint, and held exhibitions in Bến Tre and Mỹ Tho, raising funds for the famine in Northern Vietnam. He also joined the Vanguard Youth and participated in the revolutionary movement in Bến Tre.

=== Participation in the Resistance ===
With the outbreak of the Indochina War, he became the head of the anti-guerrilla unit in Chau Thanh, Ben Tre. In his memoir, he wrote: "My hatred for the enemy grew stronger, and I put aside my brushes and pencils, giving them to my mother, and I tore up my identity papers and tax records before taking on every task assigned by the revolution". By the end of 1946, he moved to Zone 8 and became a reporter. He traveled with the Viet Quoc Army through places such as Gò Công, Mỹ Tho, Bến Tre, Sa Đéc, and the Dong Thap Muoi region, capturing scenes of labor, production, and combat in works like Dong Thap Muoi Landscape, A People's Class in a Hut, Through the Forest of Leaves, Guerrillas Passing Through the Village, and Soldiers Parting the Grass... During this time, he gained recognition for the painting Soldier Le Hong Son Killed in Action While Charging (1947), created at Vam Nuoc Trong (Mo Cay) using the blood of the fallen soldier and the painting President Ho Chi Minh with 3 Children from the North, Central, and South created with his own blood. The painting of President Ho Chi Minh was painted on silk, and he sent a letter to President Ho Chi Minh (whom he referred to as "Father") expressing his longing for peace and national liberation.

In 1949, he was assigned to work at the Southern Resistance Cultural Institute in Zone 9, directed by Professor Hoang Xuan Nhi. In mid-1950, he traveled from the southern region of Vietnam to Cambodia, Thailand, and China, reaching Viet Bac after eight months. He stayed in Viet Bac for over six months, living close to President Ho Chi Minh. During this time, he painted more than 30 works on the theme of President Ho Chi Minh, including The President's House on the Hill (silk – 1951), The President Working in the Wooden House in Viet Bac (oil – 1951), The President Fishing by the Stream (oil – 1951), and Noon Sunlight Before the President's House (oil – 1951)...

=== After 1951 ===
In 1952, he was sent to study sculpture at the Academy of Fine Arts in Czech Republic. Before returning to Vietnam, he spent several months in the Soviet Union and India studying monumental sculpture. In 1956, he became a lecturer at the Vietnam Fine Arts University until the reunification of the country in 1975. He spent a year in India for further study (1957). During this time, he continued to create a series of works focusing on revolutionary heroes, such as Võ Thị Sáu Facing the Enemy, The People of the South, Hatred for Phu Loi, Unyielding South, South as Steel, Vietnamese Mother...

After 1975, he returned to Ho Chi Minh City, continuing to create art and assist many young artists. In his later years, he completed sculptures such as Ho Chi Minh by Lenin Stream in plaster and Ho Chi Minh with Children in bronze, both displayed in front of the People's Committee headquarters in Ho Chi Minh City. He served as Honorary President of the Ho Chi Minh City Fine Arts Association, a lecturer at the Vietnam Fine Arts University, a permanent member of the Executive Committee of the Vietnam Fine Arts Association, and President of the Ho Chi Minh City Fine Arts Association.

He died on July 12, 2002, in Ho Chi Minh City at the age of 83. His family opened a memorial house in his name to honor him.

In 1996, the government awarded him the Ho Chi Minh Prize in the first phase of the prize's establishment.

== Works ==
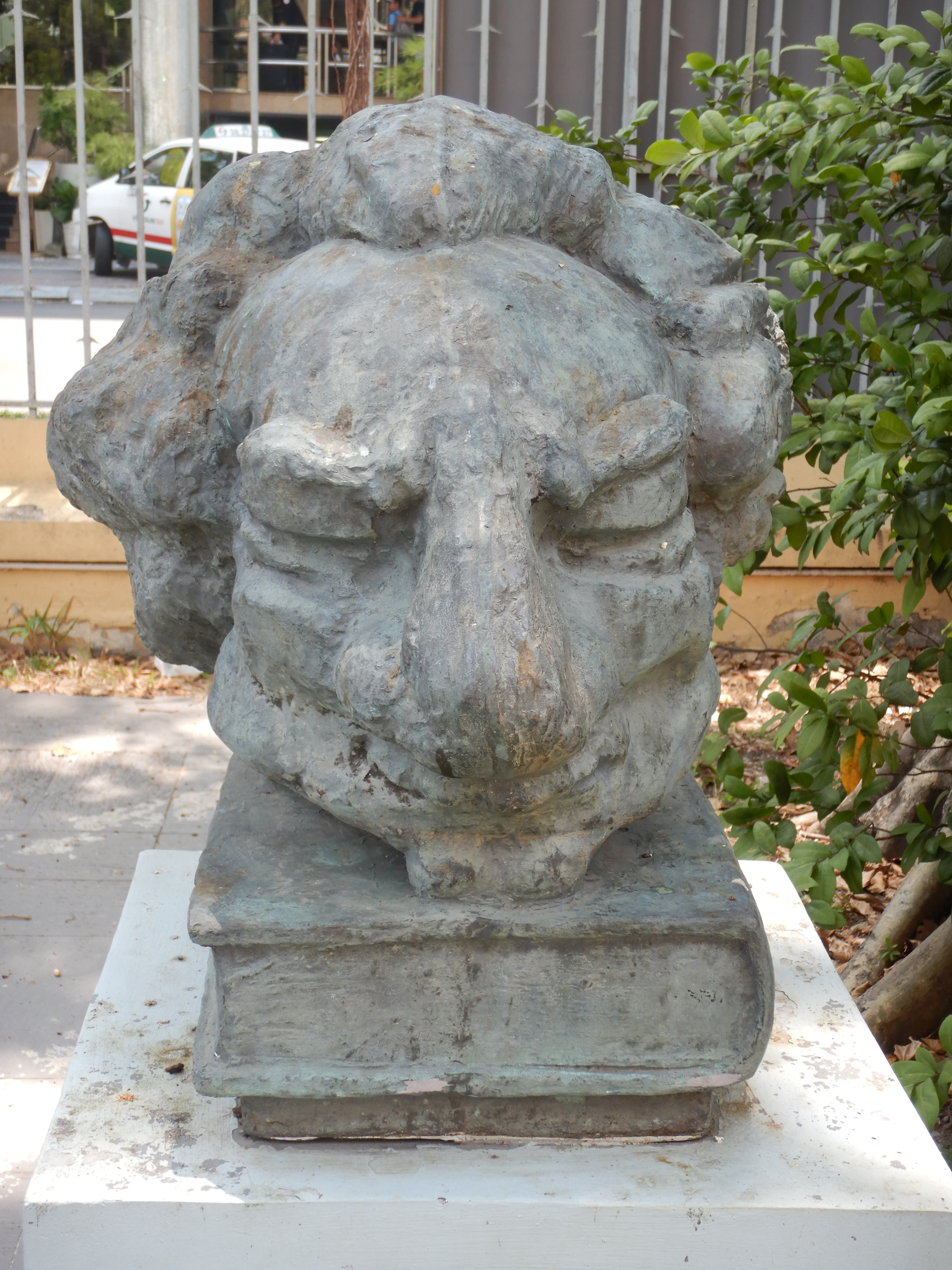
Bronze bust of Nguyễn Tuân named "Portrait of the writer Nguyễn Tuân" in Ho Chi Minh City Museum of Fine Arts. It was made by Diệp Minh Châu in 1951. Dimensions: 30 × 45 × 55 cm.

- "Passing the mangrove forest” (Gouache, 1947) Vietnam National Museum of Fine Arts

Comparison of the same statues made from different material:

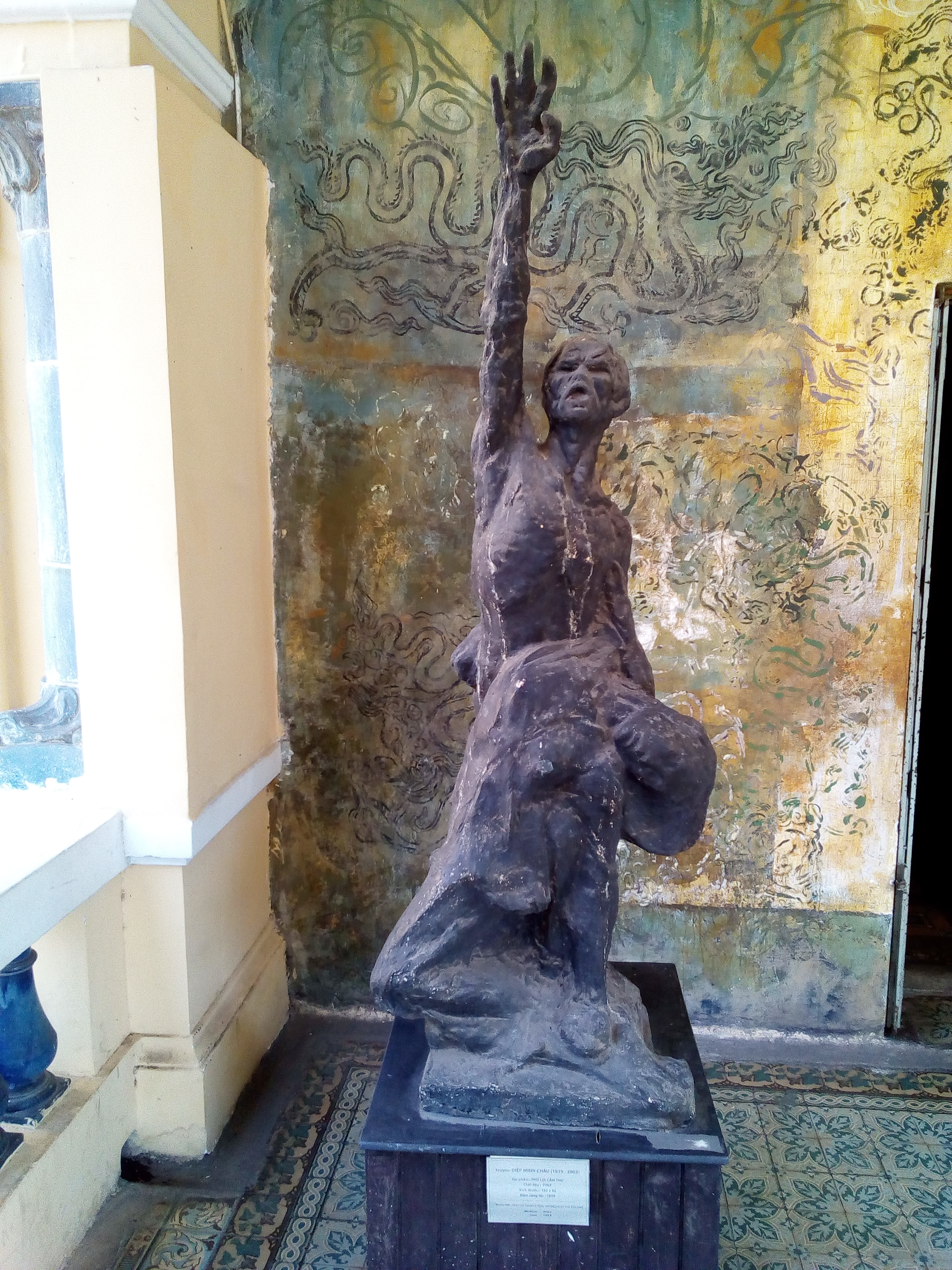
1959 poly statue Phu Loi people feel hatred for the enemy.

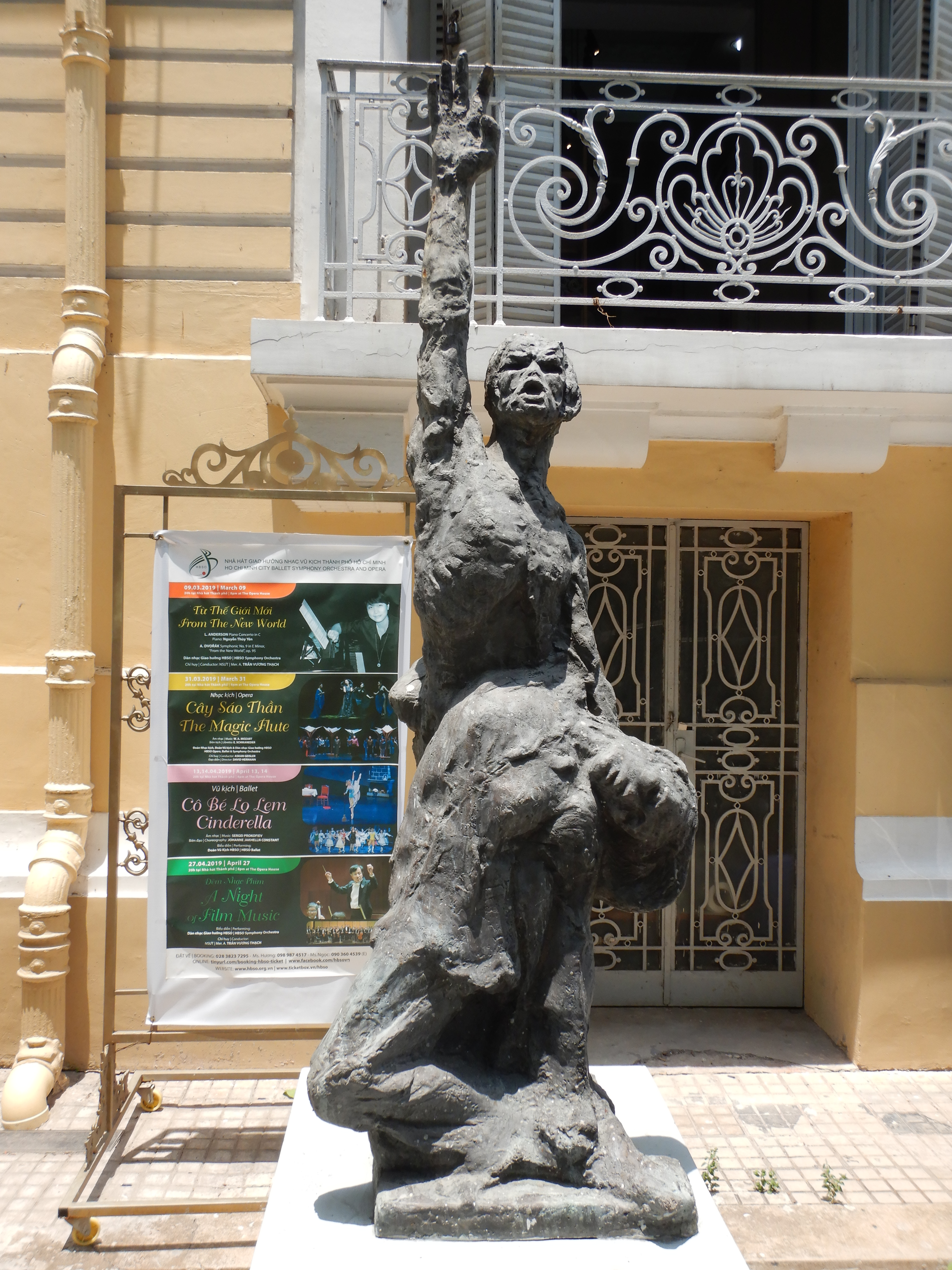
1959 bronze statue The people of Phu Loi oppose the enemy.

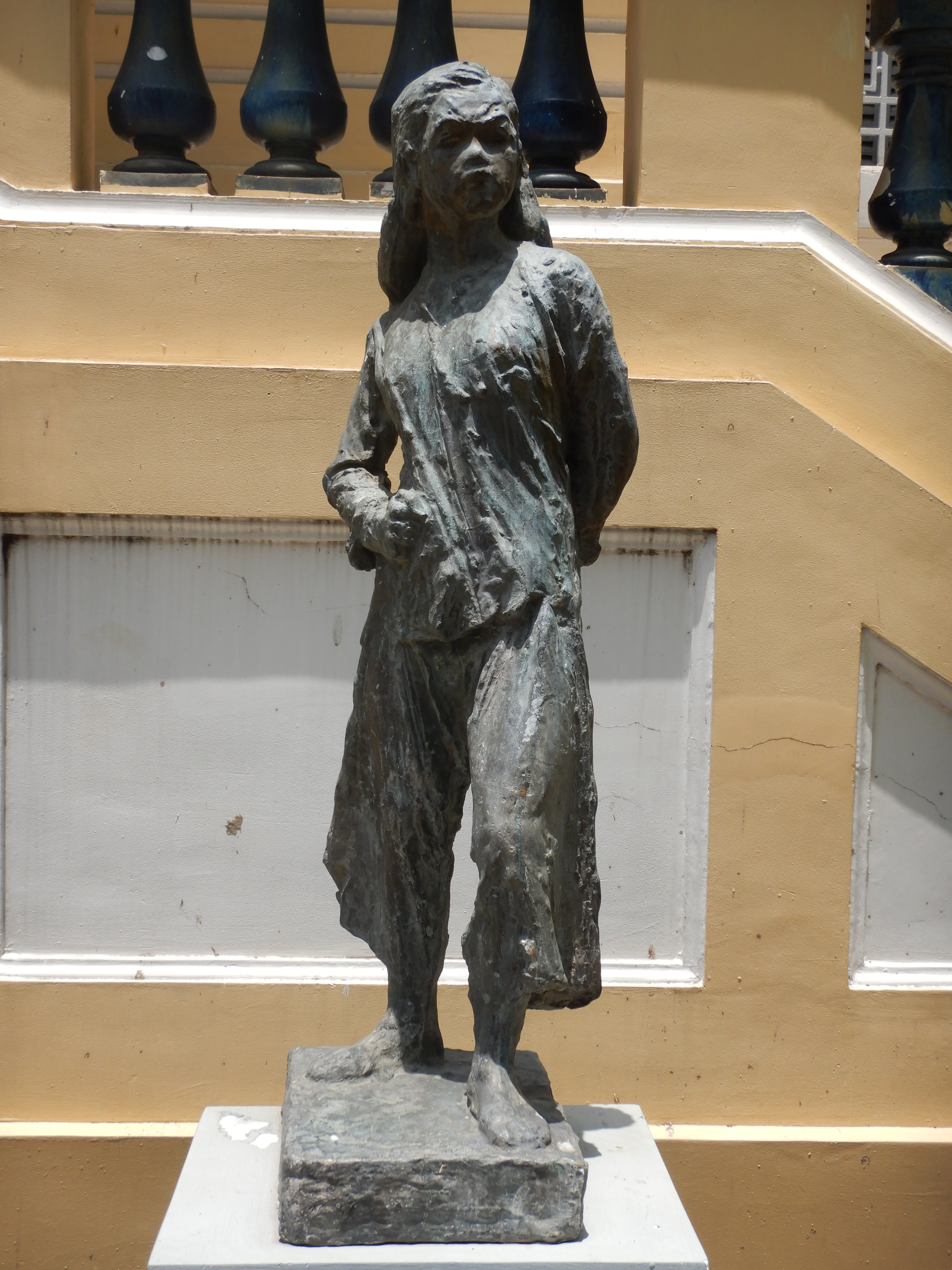
1958 bronze statue of Võ Thị Sáu.
