= Nguyễn Thị Kim =

Vietnamese sculptor

- Born: 10 December 1917; Hanoi, Vietnam
- Died: 1 December 2011; Hanoi, Vietnam

Nguyễn Thị Kim (10 December 1917 – 1 December 2011 ) was a Vietnamese sculptor. Her best known work is her statue of Ho Chi Minh, and she was awarded the Ho Chi Minh Prize for fine art in 2000.
