= Nguyễn Đỗ Cung =

Vietnamese artist

Nguyễn Đỗ Cung (1912 - 22 September 1977) was a Vietnamese artist. He was a student of EBAI in Hanoi. In 1946, he was one of the first, with Tô Ngọc Vân and Nguyễn Thị Kim to make portraits of Ho Chi Minh.

In 1963, Cung was entrusted with finding a site for a Vietnam Museum of Fine Arts (vi:Bảo tàng mỹ thuật Việt Nam). He selected an abandoned Catholic girls boarding house, run as the Famille de Jean d'Arc, built in 1937. He was awarded the Ho Chi Minh Prize for fine art in 1996.
