= Đinh Đăng Định =

Vietnamese photographer (b. 1920, d. 2013)

Đinh Đăng Định (20 April 1920 – 11 August 2013) was the personal photographer to Ho Chi Minh. He also co-founded the Vietnam Artistic Photographer's Association (VAPA) with Lâm Tấn Tài.

== Early years ==
Định was born in Kiêu Kỵ, Hanoi, Vietnam.

== Career ==
=== Anti-French Resistance (1936–1945) ===
In 1936, Định joined the anti-French resistance. However, it wasn't until 1941 when Ho Chi Minh set up at anti-Japanese base at Pác Bó that Định was allowed to photograph political activities.

=== Personal photographer to Ho Chi Minh (1945 - 1969) ===
Định became the personal photographer to Ho Chi Minh, taking the first official portrait of him on 2 September 1945 in Hanoi. The portrait was meant to be distributed to the public to publicise his identity. From 1945 onwards, Định would accompany Ho Chi Minh to capture images of his meetings with French colonial commanders and other high-ranking members of the Communist Party of Vietnam as well as document people's support of Ho's resistance movement. Định worked in the Party's Central Office, taking photos of Ho Chi Minh until he died in 1969.

While in Hanoi, Định founded the Vietnam Artistic Photographer's Association (VAPA) on 8 December 1965.

=== Ho Chi Minh Trail (1974–1975) ===
After Ho's death, Định was tasked to go South and document route 9 of the Ho Chi Minh trail.

=== Accolades ===
In 2000, Định was awarded the Ho Chi Minh Prize for his contributions to photography.
