= Nguyễn Đức Toàn =

Nguyễn Đức Toàn (1929 – 10 July 2016), was a Vietnamese military musician, conductor and songwriter. He was a Merited Artist of Vietnam (Nghệ sĩ Ưu tú) with the rank of Colonel in the Vietnamese Army, and was a recipient of the Hồ Chí Minh Prize in 2000.
