= Xuân Hồng =

Vietnamese songwriter and singer

Xuân Hồng (Tây Ninh, 1928–1996) was a Vietnamese songwriter and singer. He was a recipient of the Hồ Chí Minh Prize posthumously in 2000.
