= Nam Cao =

Vietnamese writer (1915–1951)

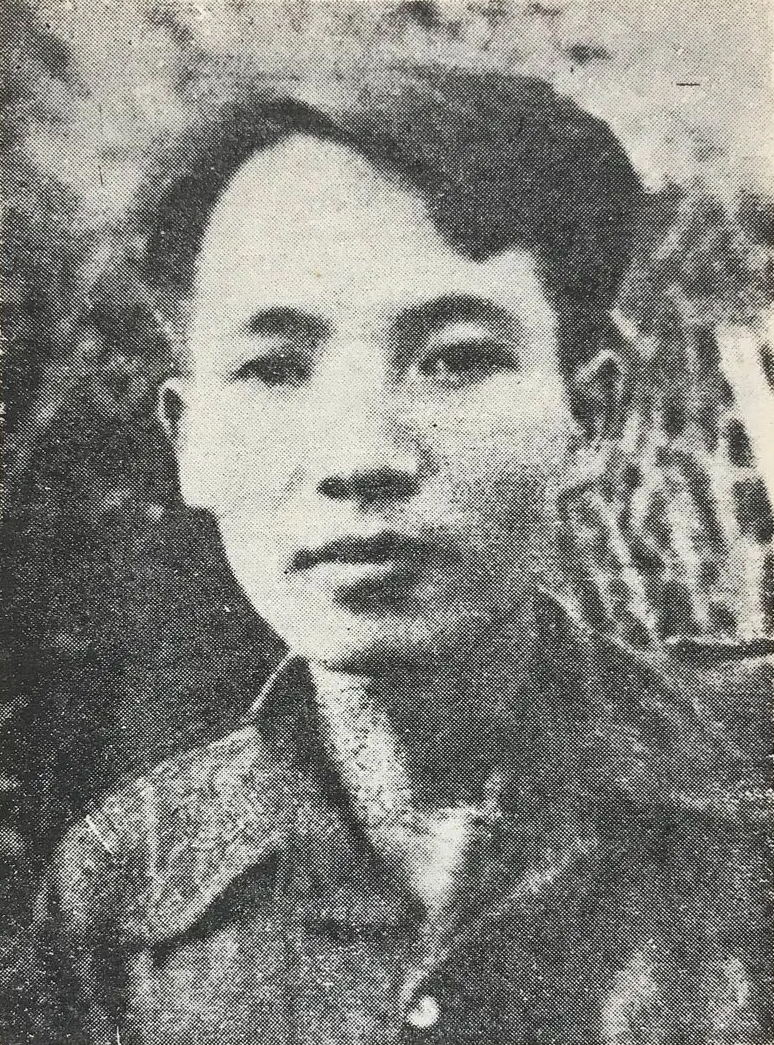
- Nam Cao (1915–1951)
- Born: Trần Hữu Tri (Baptized as Joseph (Giuse)); 29 October 1915; Đại Hoàng, Lý Nhân District, Hà Nam Province, French Indochina
- Died: November 30, 1951 (aged 36); Gia Viễn District, Ninh Bình Province, Democratic Republic of Vietnam
- Occupations: Writer, journalist
- Spouse: Trần Thị Sen (m. 1935)
- Children: 5
- Parent(s): Trần Hữu Huệ (father); Trần Thị Minh (mother)
- Writing career
- Pen name: Nam Cao, Thúy Rư, Xuân Du, Nguyệt
- Period: 1934–1951
- Notable works: Chí Phèo (1941); Sống mòn (1944); Lão Hạc (1943); Đời thừa (1943); Đôi mắt (1948)
- Notable awards: Hồ Chí Minh Prize (1996)

Trần Hữu Trị (29 October 1915 – 30 November 1951), better known by his pen name Nam Cao, was a Vietnamese short story writer, novelist, and journalist. He was associated with the critical realism movement in Vietnamese literature prior to the August Revolution of 1945.

Born into a Catholic farming family in Hà Nam Province, Nam Cao worked as a clerk in Saigon and a private schoolteacher in Hanoi before turning to writing. His 1941 short story Chí Phèo, which portrayed rural peasants in the era of French colonial rule, became his best-known work. His fiction from this era focused primarily on two themes: the struggles of poor farmers and the economic insecurity of lower-middle-class intellectuals.

Following the 1945 revolution, Nam Cao joined the National Salvation Cultural Association (Hội Văn hóa Cứu quốc) and served as a journalist and war correspondent during the First Indochina War. On 30 November 1951, he was killed by French forces while on a mission in Ninh Bình Province at the age of 36. He was posthumously awarded the Hồ Chí Minh Prize in 1996. His former home and memorial site in Lý Nhân District was recognized as a National Monument of Vietnam in 2023.

== Biography ==
=== Early life ===
Trần Hữu Tri was born on 29 October 1915 in Đại Hoàng village, Cao Đà commune, Nam Sang district (present-day Hòa Hậu commune, Lý Nhân District, Hà Nam Province), then part of Tonkin in French Indochina. His pseudonym "Nam Cao" was derived from the first syllables of his native district (Nam Sang) and commune (Cao Đà).

He was raised in a Catholic farming family and was baptized with the name Joseph (Giuse). His father, Trần Hữu Huệ, worked as a carpenter, timber trader, and traditional healer, while his mother, Trần Thị Minh, worked in farming, gardening, and weaving.

In 1935, at age 20, he married Trần Thị Sen (baptismal name Maria Sen), a villager from Đại Hoàng. The couple had five children, including their eldest daughter Trần Thị Hồng. One of their children, Trần Mai Thiên, died during the Vietnamese famine of 1945.

=== Saigon, teaching, and early writing (1935–1944) ===
In November 1935, Nam Cao moved to Saigon, where he worked for two and a half years as a clerk in a tailor shop owned by Ba Lễ. During this time, he began publishing short stories such as Cảnh cuối cùng ("The Final Scene") and Hai cái xác ("Two Corpses") under the pseudonym Thúy Rư in the Hanoi weekly magazine Tiểu thuyết thứ bảy ("Saturday Novels").

Returning to Northern Vietnam in May 1938 due to poor health, he prepared for exams to complete his diploma and subsequently moved to Hanoi to teach at Công Thành, a private school on Thụy Khuê Street. He continued publishing short stories (Nghèo, Đui mù, Cái chết của con Mực) and poetry under the pseudonyms Thúy Rư, Xuân Du, and Nguyệt in newspapers, including Hà Nội tân văn and Ích Hữu. Following the Japanese invasion of French Indochina in 1940, the Công Thành school was requisitioned by Japanese troops to store rice, leaving Nam Cao unemployed. He briefly taught at Kỳ Giang private school in Thái Bình Province before returning to Đại Hoàng to work as a private tutor and writer.

Nam Cao gained wider public attention in 1941 with the publication of his short story collection Đôi lứa xứng đôi ("A Perfect Match"), issued by Đời Mới Publishing House in Hanoi. The collection's lead story featuring a portrayal of rural life in Vietnam, originally titled Cái lò gạch cũ ("The Old Brick Kiln"), was retitled Chí Phèo upon its 1946 reprint. The story brought him literary recognition and acclaim.

Between 1941 and 1944, Nam Cao published over 20 short stories as well as serialized fiction. In 1944, he serialized his novel Truyện người hàng xóm ("A Neighbor's Story") in Trung Bắc Chủ nhật and completed the manuscript for his semi-autobiographical novel Chết mòn ("Dying Slowly"), which was published posthumously in 1956 under the title Sống mòn ("Living a Corroded Life").

=== Wartime and affiliation with the Viet Minh (1943–1951) ===
In April 1943, Nam Cao joined the National Salvation Cultural Association (Hội Văn hóa Cứu quốc Việt Nam), an underground organization affiliated with the Viet Minh. Facing police surveillance, he left Hanoi and returned to Hà Nam. During the August Revolution of 1945, he participated in the takeover of power in Lý Nhân District, and served as chairman of his commune's local revolutionary committee.

In late 1945, Nam Cao returned to Hanoi as editorial secretary for the journal Tiên Phong ("Pioneer"). He subsequently joined the "Nam tiến" (Southward Advance) force as a war correspondent in southern Vietnam before returning to the north to edit the Hà Nam provincial newspapers Giữ nước ("Guarding the Country") and Cờ chiến thắng ("Victory Flag"). During the war era, the Viet Minh encouraged a Vietnamese version of "socialist realism" in literature, and writers were encouraged to draw inspiration from "the tonic of contact with soldiers, workers, and peasants."

In late 1947, Nam Cao moved to Việt Bắc, working as editorial secretary for the newspaper Cứu Quốc ("National Salvation") and writing his wartime diary Nhật ký ở rừng ("Living in the Forest"). He joined the Communist Party of Vietnam in 1948. In 1950, he transferred to the Vietnam Association of Literature and Arts (Hội Văn nghệ Việt Nam), working on the editorial board of Văn Nghệ magazine and reporting on the Battle of Route Coloniale 4. He remarked during the war era that his motto was "Live first, then write" (Sống đã rồi hãy viết).

=== Death ===
In November 1951, Nam Cao attended a literature conference and participated with a Viet Minh tax collection team traveling in what was then "Interzone III". On 30 November 1951, while near the border of Ninh Bình and Hà Nam provinces, his group and French military forces engaged in battle. Nam Cao was captured and executed at Hoàng Đan fort in Gia Viễn District, Ninh Bình Province, at age 36. He died leaving his final manuscript, Định mức ("The Quota"), unfinished.

His body was initially buried in an unmarked grave, and its location remained unknown for several decades. In early 1996, a search effort was organized by various cultural and state organizations to find his grave. His remains were identified in a cemetery in Gia Viễn District and reburied in his native village of Đại Hoàng in Lý Nhân District.

== Literary style and themes ==
Nam Cao's pre-1945 fiction primarily focused on two social groups: rural peasants and impoverished intellectuals. Works such as Chí Phèo, Lão Hạc, Một đám cưới ("A Wedding"), Một bữa no ("A Full Meal"), and Lang Rận depicted village poverty, social marginalization, and class friction. His stories examined how and whether personal integrity could be maintained in conditions of severe hardship. Semi-autobiographical works such as Sống mòn, Đời thừa ("A Unworthy Life"), Giăng sáng ("In the Moonlight"), and Nước mắt ("Tears") portrayed teachers, writers, and clerks dealing with financial insecurity and domestic struggles. In general, characters in Nam Cao's works are at bottom good people, but social oppression and economic hardship can twist or corrupt them, a message that aligned well with his revolutionary politics that aimed to change society itself.

He advocated a realist approach to writing. In a conversation with writer Vũ Bằng, Nam Cao described his perspective: "Life isn't as complicated as people often write in lyrical novels... I write exactly as I see it, without adding or subtracting anything."

Nam Cao's origins matched the settings of his stories, being familiar with life in both impoverished rural environments and among striving would-be intellectuals. He based several of his fictional characters on real people he knew from Đại Hoàng. For example, Trùm Sạn, a poor neighbor whose son moved away for work and who kept a pet dog, and Trùm Lượng, a lonely villager who committed suicide using dog poison, both have variants in Lão Hạc. Chí Phèo likely drew inspiration from Chí (a local pig butcher paid in wine and intestines) and Trịnh (an orphaned villager known for public drunkenness near an old brick kiln).

His work in 1945–1951 became more journalistic and ideological as he wrote from the front lines of the struggle against the French. His work still contained a nuanced understanding of the complexity of humanity, but was notably more political. Đôi mắt ("The Eyes") is often held up as an archetypical example of this second phase of Cao's work, and is something of a political satire. In the story, the narrator meets up with the Hoangs, old friends who had to move out to the countryside from Hanoi. However, the Hoangs are disconnected from their village and the war, look down upon and despise the 'uncultured' locals, and prefer to spend their time with others from the cities – even though these fellow exiles are themselves disgraced. The Hoangs are playfully mocked, yet also pitied and portrayed with genuine sympathy.

== Legacy and honors ==
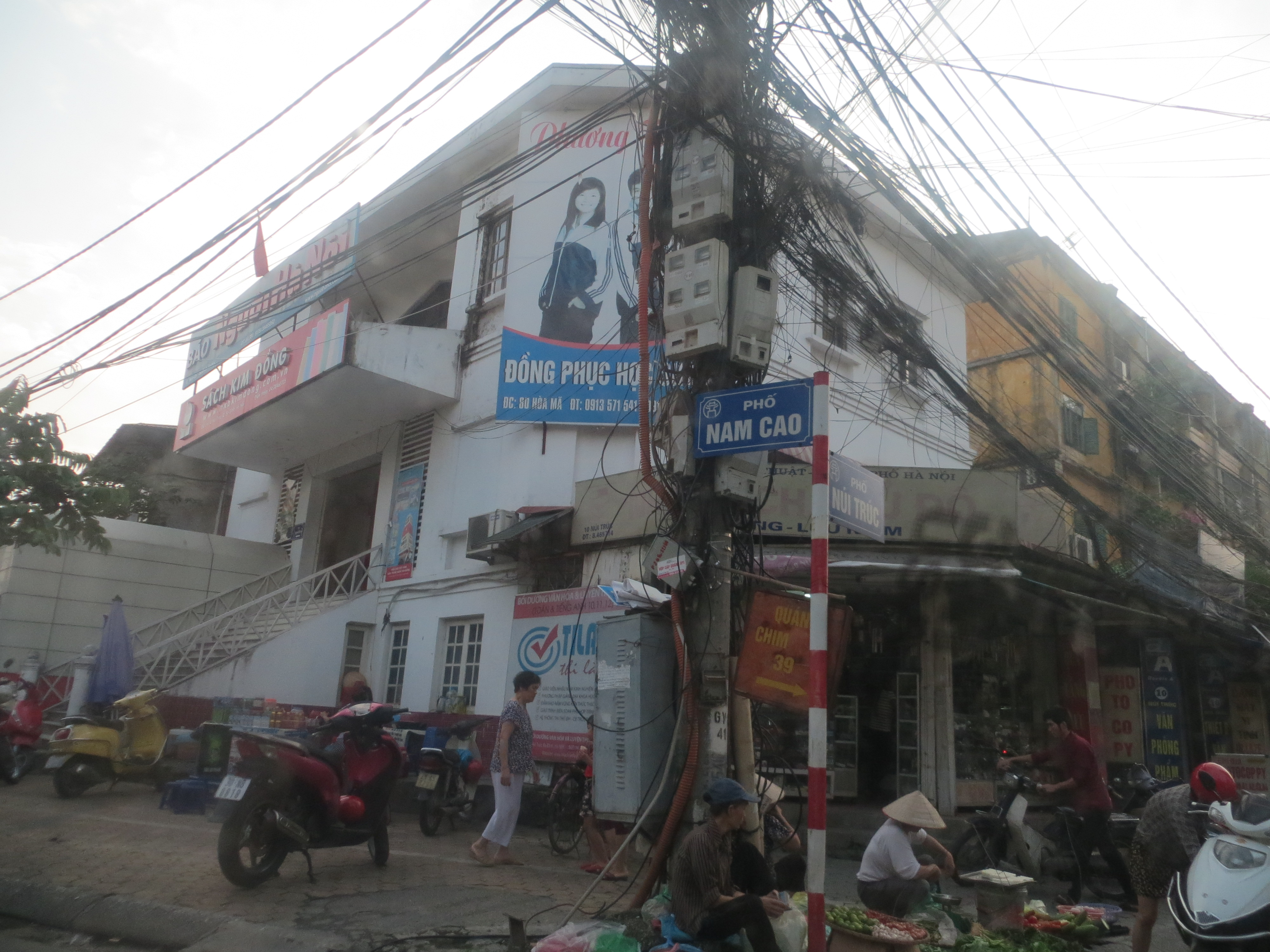
A sign for Phố Nam Cao (Nam Cao street) in Hanoi

In 1996, Nam Cao was posthumously awarded the Hồ Chí Minh Prize for Literature and Arts for his major published works. A memorial was built to him in Hòa Hậu commune, Lý Nhân District in 2004; the site was officially recognized as a National Monument of Vietnam in October 2023. Streets in Hanoi (Ba Đình District), Ho Chi Minh City (Thủ Đức), Da Nang, Biên Hòa, and Rạch Giá are named after him.

== Selected works ==
Novels

- Truyện người hàng xóm ("A Neighbor's Story", serialized 1944)
- Sống mòn ("Living a Corroded Life", written 1944, published 1956)

Short story collections and major stories

- Chí Phèo (1941; originally Đôi lứa xứng đôi)
- Dì Hảo ("Aunt Hảo", 1941)
- Cái chết của con Mực ("The Death of the Black Dog", 1940)
- Giăng sáng ("In the Moonlight", 1942)
- Trẻ con không được ăn thịt chó ("Kids Shouldn't Eat Dog Meat", 1942)
- Bài học quét nhà ("A Lesson in Sweeping", 1943)
- Đời thừa ("An Unworthy Life", 1943)
- Lão Hạc ("Old Hạc", 1943)
- Một bữa no ("A Full Meal", 1943)
- Tư cách mõ ("Status of the Town Crier", 1943)
- Một đám cưới ("A Wedding", 1944)
- Mò sâm-banh ("Diving for Champagne", 1945)
- Cách mạng ("Revolution", 1946)
- Đôi mắt ("The Eyes", 1948)

Other short stories

- Ba người bạn ("Three Friends")
- Bẩy bông lúa lép ("Seven Flat Rice Ears")
- Cái mặt không chơi được ("An Unfriendly Face", 1942)
- Chuyện buồn giữa đêm vui ("The Sad Story in the Happy Night")
- Chuyện tình ("Love Story")
- Con mèo ("The Cat", 1942)
- Con mèo mắt ngọc ("The Opal-Eyed Cat")
- Cười ("Laughing")
- Đầu đường xó chợ ("The Street Urchin")
- Điếu văn ("A Funeral Oration")
- Đôi móng giò ("A Pair of Pig-Trotters", 1942)
- Đòn chồng ("Punishing Husband", 1942)
- Đón khách ("Greeting Guests", 1942)
- Làm tổ ("Making a Nest")
- Lang Rận ("Doctor Lice")
- Mong mưa ("Longing for Rain")
- Một chuyện xu-vơ-nia ("A Souvenir Story")
- Mua danh ("Bribery")
- Mua nhà ("Buying a House")
- Người thợ rèn ("The Blacksmith")
- Nhìn người ta sung sướng ("Seeing Them Happy", 1942)
- Nhỏ nhen ("Narrow-Mindedness", 1942)
- Những chuyện không muốn viết ("Stories Unwilling to Write", 1942)
- Những trẻ khốn nạn ("The Cursed Youths")
- Nụ cười ("The Smile")
- Nước mắt ("Tears")
- Nửa đêm ("Midnight", 1943)
- Phiêu lưu ("An Adventure")
- Quái dị ("Abnormality")
- Quên điều độ ("Irregularity")
- Rình trộm ("Eavesdropping")
- Rửa hờn ("Retaliating for the Indignant")
- Sao lại thế này? ("Why Like This?")
- Thôi về đi ("Let's Just Go Home")
- Từ ngày mẹ chết ("Since My Mother Died")
- Xem bói ("Fortune-Telling")

Memoirs and non-fiction

- Đường vô Nam ("Road to the South", 1946)
- Nhật ký ở rừng ("In the Jungle", 1948)
- Chuyện biên giới ("Frontier Stories", 1948)
- Vài nét ghi qua vùng giải phóng ("Notes from the Liberated Zone", 1950)
- Cách đồn địch bốn cây số ("Four Kilometers from an Enemy Post", 1950)
- Địa dư Việt Nam (Geography textbook, co-authored with Văn Tân, 1951)

Four manuscripts of Nam Cao are lost: Cái bát, Một đời người, Cái miếu, and Ngày lụt.

English translations and collections

- Cao, Nam (1961). Chi Pheo and Other Stories. Hanoi: Foreign Languages Publishing House.
