= Phan Huỳnh Điểu =

Phan Huỳnh Điểu (11 November 1924, in Đà Nẵng – 29 June 2015) was a Vietnamese composer. He composed the military anthem vi:Đoàn Vệ quốc quân (1945), and was a recipient of the Hồ Chí Minh Prize in 2000.

== Works ==
- Mùa đông binh sĩ (1946)
- Những người đã chết
- Tình trong lá thiếp (1955)
- Quê tôi ở miền Nam
- Nhớ ơn Hồ Chủ tịch
- Ra tiền tuyến
- Đội kèn tí hon (1959)
- Những em bé ngoan (1959)
- Nhớ ơn Bác (1959)
- Anh ở đầu sông em cuối sông
- Những ánh sao đêm (1962)
- Có một đàn chim
- Bóng cây Kơ-nia (1971)
- Cuộc đời vẫn đẹp sao (1971)
- Đây thôn Vỹ Dạ
- Đêm nay anh ở đâu
- Giải phóng quân
- Hành khúc ngày và đêm (1972)
- Nhớ (1973)
- Ở hai đầu nỗi nhớ
- Đà Nẵng ơi, chúng con đã về (1975)
- Sợi nhớ sợi thương (1978)
- Quảng Nam yêu thương
- Thơ tình cuối mùa thu
- Thuyền và biển
- Tương tư chiều
- Hát về thành phố quê hương (1997)
- Khi không còn em nữa (1992)
- Tiếng thu
- Bạn đến chơi nhà
- Làm cây thông reo
- Người ấy bây giờ đang ở đâu
- Tình ca Đămbri
- Tia nắng
- Chiều tím
- Nhớ lắm chiều nay
- Tìm em bên giếng nước
- Thư Tình Cuối Mùa Thu (lyrics Xuân Quỳnh)
