= Tế Hanh =

Vietnamese poet (1921–2009)

- Born: Trần Tế Hanh; June 20, 1921; Dong Yen Village, Binh Son District, Quang Ngai Province, Central Vietnam, Indochina Federation
- Died: July 16, 2009 (aged 88); Hanoi, Vietnam
- Occupation: Poet

Trần Tế Hanh, (June 20, 1921 – July 16, 2009) pen name Tế Hanh, was a Vietnamese poet of the pre-war era.

== Biography ==
Tế Hanh, whose real name was Trần Tế Hanh, was born on June 20, 1921, in Dong Yen village, Binh Son district; now Binh Son commune, Quang Ngai province. His father was Tran Tat To, who worked as a teacher and a physician. He had four brothers, the youngest of whom was the musician Trần Thế Bảo.

As a child, he attended village and district schools. At the age of 15, he went to study at Khải Định School (now Quốc Học – Huế High School for the Gifted).

Having a natural love for poetry, and being "guided" by the poet Huy Cận, So Tế Hanh began composing. In 1938, at the age of 17, he wrote his first poem: "Những ngày nghỉ học".

He then continued writing, compiling his poems into a collection called "Nghẹn ngào". In 1939, this collection received an honorable mention from the Self-Reliant Literary Group.

In 1941, Te Hanh and his poems ("Quê hương", "Lời con đường quê", "Vu vơ", "Ao ước") were introduced by Hoai Thanh and Hoai Chan in the book Vietnamese Poets (published in 1942).

In August 1945, Tế Hanh joined the Việt Minh, participating in cultural and educational work in Huế and Đà Nẵng; and was a member of the Education Committee in the Provisional Committee of Da Nang City after the success of the August Revolution.

From 1949 to 1954, he was on the executive board of the Arts and Literature Branch of Zone V.

After the Geneva Accords of 1954, he relocated to North Vietnam and worked at the Association of Literature and Arts.

In 1957, the Vietnam Writers Association was established, and Te Hanh joined the editorial board of the Association's weekly newspaper, Van. For many years, he also served as a member of the executive committee and the Standing Committee of the Association.

In 1996, he was awarded the first Hồ Chí Minh Prize for Literature and Arts.

In the 1980s, he suffered from an eye ailment that gradually led to blindness. From then on, he was bedridden, alternating between periods of lucidity and delirium. He passed away at 12 noon on July 16, 2009, in Hanoi after many years battling a cerebral hemorrhage.

== Main works ==
- Những ngày nghỉ học (1938)
- Nghẹn ngào (1939) (Note: 47 poets withdrew the poem "Quê Hương" to the collection "Hoa Niên" (1945))
- Hoa niên (1945)
- Tập thơ tìm lại (1945)
- Hoa mùa thi (1948)
- Nhân dân một lòng (1952)
- Gửi miền Bắc (1955)
- Lòng miền Nam (1956) (Note: 20 Poems)
- Tiếng sóng (1960) (Note: 15 Poems)
- Chuyện em bé cười ra đồng tiền (1960) (Note: Children's poetry)
- Thơ và cuộc sống mới (1961) (Note: Collection of critical essays)
- Bài thơ tháng bảy (1962)
- Những tấm bản đồ (1965)
- Hai nửa yêu thương (1967)
- Khúc ca mới (1967) (Note: 44 Poems)
- Đi suốt bài ca (1970)
- Câu chuyện quê hương (1973)
- Thơ viết cho con (1974)
- Theo nhịp tháng ngày (1974)
- Giữa những ngày xuân (1976)
- Con đường và dòng sông (1980)
- Tiếng sáo, tiếng đàn, tiếng hát (1983)
- Bài ca sự sống (1985)
- Tuyển tập Tế Hanh, tập I (1987)
- Thơ Tế Hanh (1989)
- Vườn xưa (1992)
- Giữa anh và em (1992)
- Em chờ anh (1993)
- Tuyển tập Tế Hanh, tập II (1997)
- Nhớ con sông quê hương
- Chiều thu, trong tập Khúc Ca Mới (1966).

Besides poetry, Tế Hanh also translated many works by great poets around the world, wrote literary criticism essays, and children's poetry.

== Award ==
- The Self-Reliance Literary Award of the 1939 Literary Group.
- The Phạm Văn Đồng Award presented by the Literary and Artistic Association of Zone V.
- The Ho Chi Minh Award for Literature and Arts, first round, 1996.
