= Học Phi =

Vietnamese novelist and playwright

Học Phi Order of Independence
- Born: Chu Văn Tập; 11 February 1913; Tiên Lữ, Hưng Yên, French Indochina
- Died: 6 May 2014 (aged 101); Hanoi, Vietnam
- Occupation(s): Novelist & Playwright
- Years active: 1936–2014
- Children: 2

Chu Văn Tập (11 February 1913 – 6 May 2014), better known by his pen name Học Phi, was a famous Vietnamese novelist and playwright. He was awarded the Hồ Chí Minh Prize in 1996. He was the father of author Chu Lai.
