= Nguyễn Xuân Khoát =

Vietnamese pianist and song composer

Nguyễn Xuân Khoát (Hanoi, 11 February 1910 – 1993) was a Vietnamese pianist and song composer. He was the first president of the Vietnam Composers' Association, and posthumously in 1996 was a recipient of the Hồ Chí Minh Prize.
