= Hoàng Việt =

Vietnamese composer (1928–1967)

Hoàng Việt, real name Lê Chí Trực (28 February 1928– 31 December 1967) was a Vietnamese composer. He was a posthumous recipient of the Hồ Chí Minh Prize.

== Selected works ==
- Chị cả (1944–1946)
- Biệt đô thành (1944–1945)
- Tiếng còi trong sương đêm (with pen name Lê Trực, 1944–1945)
- Thành đồng Tổ quốc (1949)
- Lá xanh (1950)
- Ai nghe chiến dịch mùa xuân (1950)
- Tin tưởng (1951)
- Đêm mưa dầm (1951)
- Nhạc rừng (1951)
- Mùa lúa chín (1951)
- Lên ngàn (1952)
- Tình ca (1957)
- Tình ca 2
- Quê mẹ (1958)
- Quê hương, symphony (1965)
- Giết giặc Mỹ cứu nước (with penname Lê Quỳnh, 1965)
- Cửu long (unfinished symphony, 1966)
- Bài ca thanh niên miền Nam thành đồng (with pen name Lê Quỳnh, 1966)
- Bông sen (musical drama, co-written with Lưu Hữu Phước and Ngô Y Linh)
