= Chiêm Hóa =

- Commune
- Interactive map of Chiêm Hóa
- Coordinates: 22°12′57″N 105°12′4″E
- Country: Vietnam
- Region: Northeast
- Province: Tuyên Quang
- Established: 16 June 2025
- Administrative headquarters: Vĩnh Thịnh Hamlet

Area
  - Total: 111.65 km^{2} (43.11 sq mi)

Population (2025)
  - Total: 30,329
  - Density: 271/km^{2} (700/sq mi)

Chiêm Hóa is a commune in Tuyên Quang province, Vietnam.

== History ==
The area of present-day Chiêm Hóa Commune was formerly located in Chiêm Hóa district, Tuyên Quang province.

On 16 June 2025, the National Assembly of Vietnam adopted Resolution No. 203/2025/QH15 amending and supplementing several articles of the Constitution of the Socialist Republic of Vietnam. Under the resolution, district-level administrative units nationwide ceased to operate from 1 July 2025.

On the same date, the Standing Committee of the National Assembly of Vietnam issued Resolution No. 1684/NQ-UBTVQH15 on the arrangement of commune-level administrative units in Tuyên Quang province in 2025. Under the resolution, the entire area and population of Vĩnh Lộc Township and Xuân Quang, Phúc Thịnh, Ngọc Hội, and Trung Hòa communes were merged to form a new commune named Chiêm Hóa.
