= Vĩnh Trụ =

Vĩnh Trụ Xã Vĩnh Trụ
- Commune
- Vĩnh Trụ commune
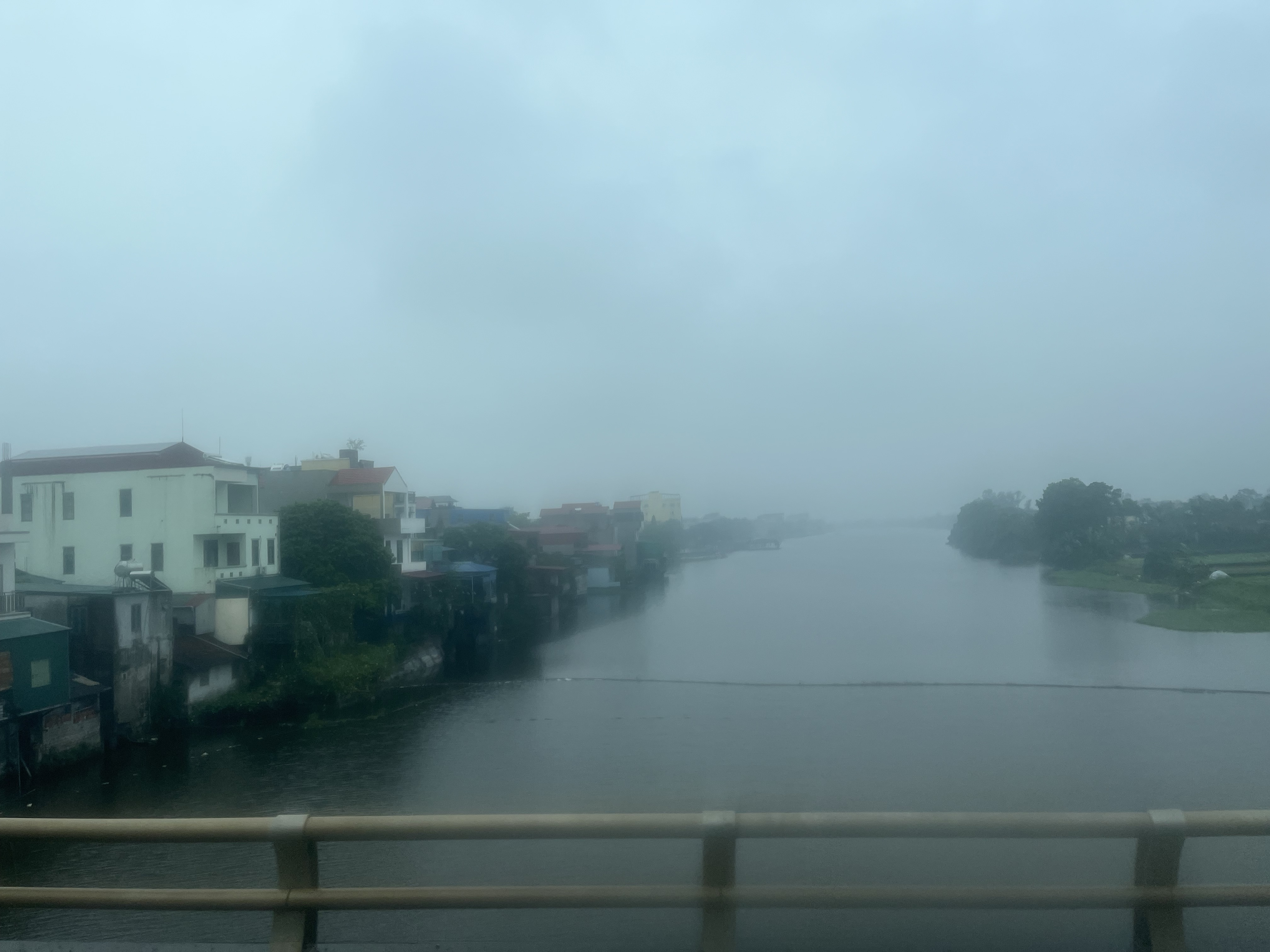

- Location within Vietnam
- Coordinates: 20°33′34″N 106°01′49″E
- Country: Vietnam
- Region: Red River Delta
- Province: Ninh Bình
- Time zone: UTC+7 (UTC + 7)

Vĩnh Trụ is a commune (xã) of Ninh Bình province, Vietnam.
