= Lý Nhân district =

Lý Nhân District Huyện Lý Nhân
- District
- Interactive map of Lý Nhân District
- Country: Vietnam
- Region: Red River Delta
- Province: Hà Nam
- Capital: Vĩnh Trụ

Area
  - Total: 64 sq mi (167 km^{2})

Population (2003)
  - Total: 189,180
- Time zone: UTC+07:00 (Indochina Time)

Lý Nhân is a former rural district of Hà Nam province in the Red River Delta region of Vietnam. As of 2003 the district had a population of 189,180. The district covers an area of 167 km^{2}. The district capital lies at Vĩnh Trụ.

== Climate ==
Climate data for Van Ly, Lý Nhân District
Month	Jan	Feb	Mar	Apr	May	Jun	Jul	Aug	Sep	Oct	Nov	Dec	Year
Record high °C (°F)	32.0 (89.6)	32.9 (91.2)	34.0 (93.2)	34.7 (94.5)	38.9 (102.0)	38.5 (101.3)	37.8 (100.0)	36.8 (98.2)	39.3 (102.7)	33.8 (92.8)	32.0 (89.6)	29.3 (84.7)	39.3 (102.7)
Mean daily maximum °C (°F)	19.0 (66.2)	19.1 (66.4)	21.1 (70.0)	25.2 (77.4)	29.7 (85.5)	31.6 (88.9)	31.9 (89.4)	31.5 (88.7)	30.5 (86.9)	28.3 (82.9)	25.1 (77.2)	21.5 (70.7)	26.2 (79.2)
Daily mean °C (°F)	16.7 (62.1)	17.2 (63.0)	19.2 (66.6)	23.1 (73.6)	27.2 (81.0)	29.1 (84.4)	29.4 (84.9)	28.8 (83.8)	27.6 (81.7)	25.2 (77.4)	22.0 (71.6)	18.5 (65.3)	23.7 (74.7)
Mean daily minimum °C (°F)	14.8 (58.6)	15.7 (60.3)	17.8 (64.0)	21.6 (70.9)	25.2 (77.4)	26.9 (80.4)	27.3 (81.1)	26.4 (79.5)	25.1 (77.2)	22.6 (72.7)	19.4 (66.9)	16.1 (61.0)	21.6 (70.9)
Record low °C (°F)	5.6 (42.1)	5.9 (42.6)	6.9 (44.4)	12.3 (54.1)	17.5 (63.5)	19.6 (67.3)	21.0 (69.8)	22.3 (72.1)	16.7 (62.1)	13.9 (57.0)	10.4 (50.7)	5.7 (42.3)	5.6 (42.1)
Average precipitation mm (inches)	28.2 (1.11)	27.5 (1.08)	43.3 (1.70)	60.2 (2.37)	146.1 (5.75)	162.5 (6.40)	192.5 (7.58)	340.2 (13.39)	394.9 (15.55)	234.1 (9.22)	78.4 (3.09)	27.9 (1.10)	1,726.4 (67.97)
Average rainy days	9.2	12.8	15.4	10.9	10.5	11.3	10.7	15.2	15.6	12.9	8.1	6.5	138.6
Average relative humidity (%)	85.8	89.4	91.4	91.0	86.8	84.3	83.2	84.8	84.4	82.9	81.7	81.8	85.6
Mean monthly sunshine hours	75.5	42.1	41.8	98.3	203.4	196.7	211.9	178.4	174.8	169.0	140.0	115.7	1,641.9
Source: Vietnam Institute for Building Science and Technology
