= Nguyễn Văn Tý =

Vietnamese composer (1925–2019)

Nguyễn Văn Tý (Nghệ An, 15 March 1925 – 26 December 2019) was a Vietnamese composer. He was a recipient of the Hồ Chí Minh Prize in 2000.
