= Quảng Điền =

- Commune
- Interactive map of Quảng Điền
- Coordinates: 16.574550562164656°N 107.51162271896645°E
- Country: Vietnam
- Municipality: Huế
- Region: North Central Coast
- Established: 16 June 2025

Area
  - Total: 45.93 km^{2} (17.73 sq mi)

Population (2025)
  - Total: 41,798
- Website: quangdien.hue.gov.vn

Quảng Điền is a commune of Huế, Vietnam.

== History ==
The area of present-day Quảng Điền Commune was formerly part of Quảng Điền district, Huế.

On 16 June 2025, the Standing Committee of the National Assembly of Vietnam issued Resolution No. 1675/NQ-UBTVQH15 on the reorganization of commune-level administrative units of Huế. Under the resolution, the entire natural area and population of Sịa Township and Quảng Phước, Quảng An, and Quảng Thọ communes, all formerly part of Quảng Điền district, were reorganized to form a new commune named Quảng Điền.
