= Nguyễn Tuân =

Famous Vietnamese author in 20th century

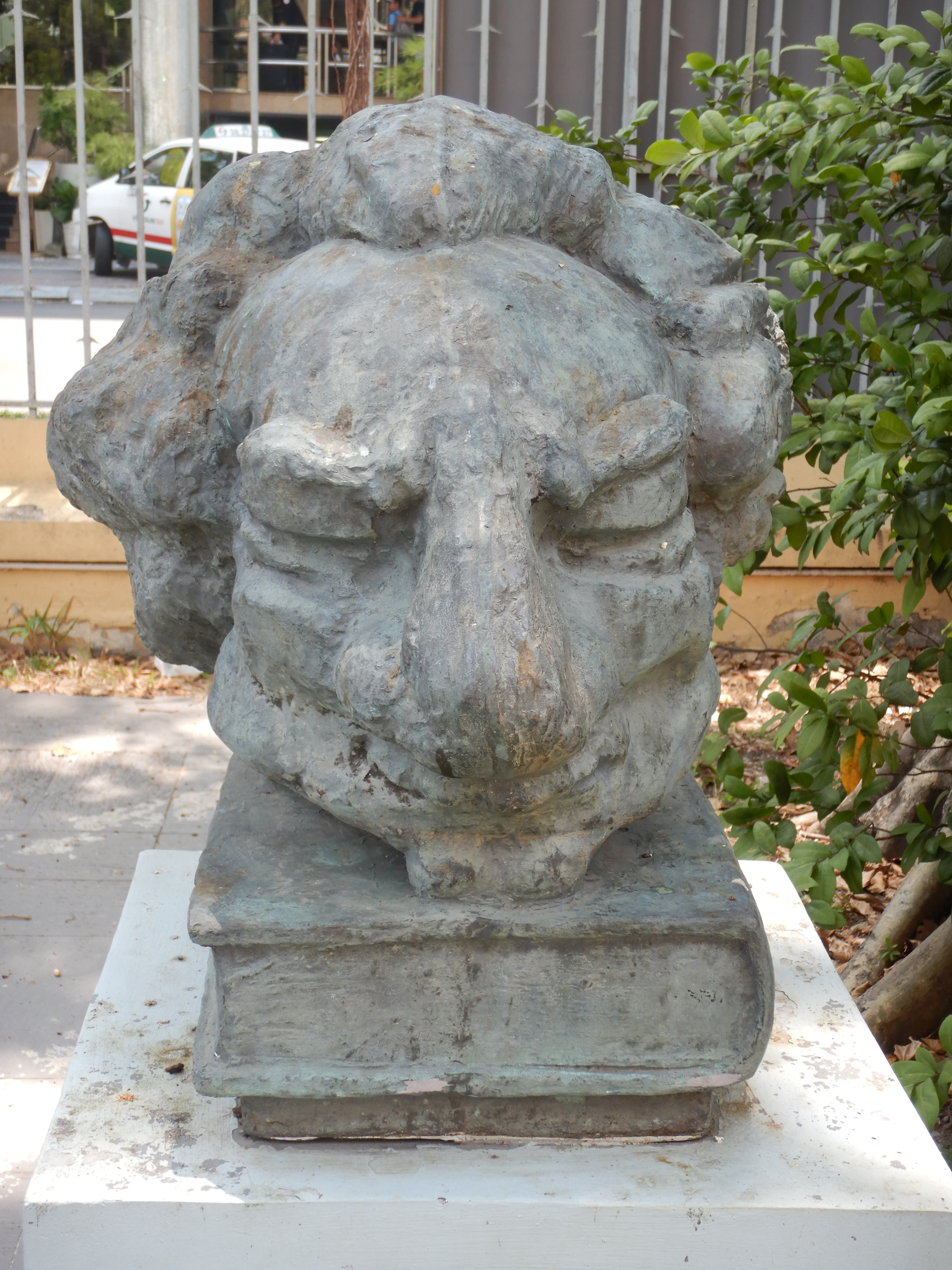
1951 bronze bust of Nguyễn Tuân by Diệp Minh Châu.

Nguyễn Tuân (July 10, 1910 – July 28, 1987) was a renowned Vietnamese author. Books about public schools in Vietnam rank him as one of the nine most famous authors of modern Vietnamese literature, specifically during the Indochina wars period. He wrote essays on multiple subjects, with clever and creative use of language. Hanoi has a street named after him, in the Thanh Xuan district.

== Biography ==
Nguyễn Tuân was born on July 10, 1910, on Hàng Bạc street in Hanoi. His family lived in Thượng Đình hamlet, Nhân Mục commune (commonly known as Mọc village), today part of Nhân Chính ward, Thanh Xuân district, Hanoi. His family adhered to the traditional Confucianism, but by the time of his childhood, Confucianism and traditional Chinese-influenced education had started to decline, replaced by more modern French-influenced culture.

In 1929, during his last year of intermediate schooling (the equivalence of ninth grade in junior high school), Nguyễn Tuân was suspended because of his participation in a petition against a few French teachers, who demeaned Vietnamese people. Shortly after, he was imprisoned for illegally crossing the border of colonial French Indochina to Thailand. Upon his release, he started writing as a journalist and an author.

Nguyễn Tuân began his writings in the early 1930s, but only gained public recognition in 1938 with several essays and reports such as Vang Bóng Một Thời (Echo and Shadow Upon a Time), Một Chuyến Đi (A Trip), etc. In 1941, he was again imprisoned, this time for his communication with the political revolutionaries.

After the August Revolution in 1945, Nguyễn Tuân joined the Communist party and kept working as a writer. From 1948 to 1958, he held the position of Chief Secretary of the Vietnamese Art & Literature Association. His works during this time feature mostly the scenery and cultural color of Vietnam, such as the collection of essays Sông Đà (River Đà) (1960), a diary from the Vietnam War (1965–1975), among others.

Nguyễn Tuân died in Hanoi in 1987, leaving his readers a collection of exceedingly creative and artistic work. In 1996 he was awarded the Ho Chi Minh Award for Art and Literature.

== A vignette of the character ==
Nguyễn Tuân was first a patriot, who expressed a deep love for traditional values and cultural beauties. Having a great appreciation of the Vietnamese language, he admired not only masterpieces from famous authors such as Nguyễn Du, Đoàn Thị Điểm, Tú Xương, Tản Đà..., but also the arts of the common people, like ca trù, a form of theatrical singing of northern Vietnam. The interest did not stop at being just a spectator, but helped him study and become knowledgeable at various topics, ranging from painting, sculpture, theater arts, to film. Nguyễn Tuân was also one of the first actors of the Vietnamese motion picture industry, with his participation in the first Vietnamese movie Cánh Đồng Ma (The Haunted Field).

Unlike the traditional Vietnamese people whose life and perception were often enclosed by the border of their village, Nguyễn Tuân was an adventurer. His early works, such as Thiếu Quê Hương (Without a Homeland), depict a strong character yearning for change and adventure, to learn about the world outside one's comfort zone, and to improve oneself. He is said to claim that his personality is guided by the principle of chủ nghĩa xê dịch ("motionism"), having coined the term himself. He also envisioned himself as having a mindset greater than that of the society at the time, which provoked dispute from readers and government officials. The conceited Nguyễn Tuân gradually gave way to a calmer character as he aged, which showed in the change of tone in his works, going from self-centered to seldom self-humored and mostly observant and descriptive of the surroundings. Throughout his life, Nguyễn Tuân stressed and highly valued individualism.

== Literary career and the main topics of interest ==
Nguyễn Tuân was not a successful writer from the beginning of his career. Having tried a variety of forms and techniques, such as poetry, journal, realist satire in the form of short story, he only realized his forte in essays in early 1938. This resulted in several successes: Một Chuyến Đi (A Trip), Vang Bóng Một Thời (Once Upon an Old Time), Thiếu Quê Hương (Without Homeland), Chiếc Lư Đồng Mắt Cua (The Crab-Eyed Copper Censer)...

Before the August Revolution of 1945, the main topics of Nguyễn Tuân's work revolved around "motionism", the beauty of the past, and the corrupted lifestyle. The idea of "motionism" was first created from his frustration and helplessness toward the historical period and its society. As he traveled, or "moved", however, his appreciation for the nature and culture of the country grew and was documented in his work (Một Chuyến Đi) with care.

The beauty of the past is portrayed in Vang Bóng Một Thời, with stories about old traditions, and the old lifestyle, which he collected from his trips. This collection of essays and short stories is written in the narrative voice of the Confucianists, whose roles were receding to the past and replaced by the new French-influenced culture. An example of this character type is Huấn Cao, in the short story Chữ Người Tử Tù (Penmanship of a Death Row Prisoner); Huấn Cao is another name of the historical figure Cao Bá Quát, a revolutionary against French control in Vietnam. Nguyễn Tuân's work during this period of time shows disbelief in the present and the future.

On the other hand, corrupt lifestyle is a common topic among the realist writers of the time, and Nguyễn Tuân was not an exception. In his work involving this topic, the narrator was often confused and lost. Nonetheless, the characters, despite living in poor conditions, wish for a pure lifestyle and maintain their respectable traditional values. Such characteristics make Nguyễn Tuân's work, Chiếc Lư Đồng Mắt Cua for example, different from other realists.

After the August Revolution of 1945, Nguyễn Tuân's work was heavily influenced by socialism and communism, as to be suitable for publication under the Communist government control. Although the stories and characters were changed, the style remained clever and honed to perfection. The main theme was still an illustration of his patriotism, with strong focus now shifted to the common people, farmers, workers, and military men, in a newly constructed society.

== Literary style ==
Nguyễn Tuân mastered the journal free style, with a tone easily distinguished from other authors. Before the August Revolution in 1945, his style can be summarized as free will with a dash of eccentricity. Every subject of his essays was described with artistic remarks and knowledgeable observations. After 1945, his works no longer seek the contrast between the old traditional values and the new life, but the tone still had the light combination of quaintness and youthful.

Because Nguyễn Tuân praised the idea of "motionism," his characters are full of willful emotions; even the settings of his works usually reflected a sense of confidence and a majestic spirit, that is said to be higher than those of his surrounding environment and of his time. An example is the character Bạch in Thiếu Quê Hương (Without Homeland). Strongly emphasized, the self in Nguyễn Tuân's works also carries careful thoughts and examination of the surroundings. The aloofness in early works was replaced by a more subtle self-humor, an indication of the maturity in his literary style and life.

== Works ==
- Ngọn đèn dầu lạc (1939) (The Peanut-Oil Lamplight)
- Vang bóng một thời (1940) (Once Upon an Old time)
- Chiếc lư đồng mắt cua (1941) (The Crab-Eyed Copper Censor)
- Tàn đèn dầu lạc (1941) (The Peanut-Oil Lamplight Part II)
- Một chuyến đi (1941) (A Trip)
- Tùy bút (1941) (Stories)
- Tóc chị Hoài (1943) (Miss Hoài's Hair)
- Tùy bút II (1943) (Stories II)
- Nguyễn (1945) (Nguyễn)
- Chùa Đàn (1946) (Dan Pagoda)
- Đường vui (1949) (Happy Road)
- Tình chiến dịch (1950) (Love at the Operations)
- Thắng càn (1953) (Over-victory)
- Chú Giao làng Seo (1953) (Uncle Giao from Village Seo)
- Đi thăm Trung Hoa (1955) (Visiting China)
- Tùy bút kháng chiến (1955) (Wartime Stories)
- Tùy bút kháng chiến và hòa bình (1956) (War and Peace Stories)
- Truyện một cái thuyền đất (1958) (Story of A Dirt Boat)
- Sông Đà (1960) (Đà River)
- Hà Nội ta đánh Mỹ giỏi (1972) (We Hanoians Fight the American Well)
- Ký (1976) (Diary)
- Tuyển tập Nguyễn Tuân (tập I: 1981, tập II: 1982) (Collection of Nguyễn Tuân, part I and II)
- Yêu ngôn (2000) (Words of Ghosts, posthumously published)
