= Lâm Tấn Tài =

Vietnamese photographer (1935-2001)

Lâm Tấn Tài (1935 - 2001) was a documentary photographer during the Vietnam War.

== Early life ==
Lâm was born in the Bà Rịa–Vũng Tàu province and moved to the North in 1946 to join the revolution.

== Career ==
After studying photography at the Lomonosov Moscow State University and Archaeology in Hanoi University, Lâm was drafted and sent south to photograph the Ho Chi Minh trail in 1965. Lâm notably also photographed the Cu Chi tunnels and the Tet Offensive, where he was blinded by M-79 grenade.

Lâm critiques the wartime photography (or Ảnh Chiến Tranh) during this era as "having missed its golden moment" by glossing over the violence of the conflict to record beautiful sights and subjects."

Lâm was appointed the first general chairman of the Việt Nam Photographers Association.

== Technique ==
Lâm used a small East German-made camera, that he purchased while studying in Moscow. He would develop his film at night, using any nearby stream to wash his negatives and prints.

== Death ==
Lâm died of cancer of the tongue in 2001.
