= Kiệu Bridge =

Kiệu Bridge Cầu Kiệu
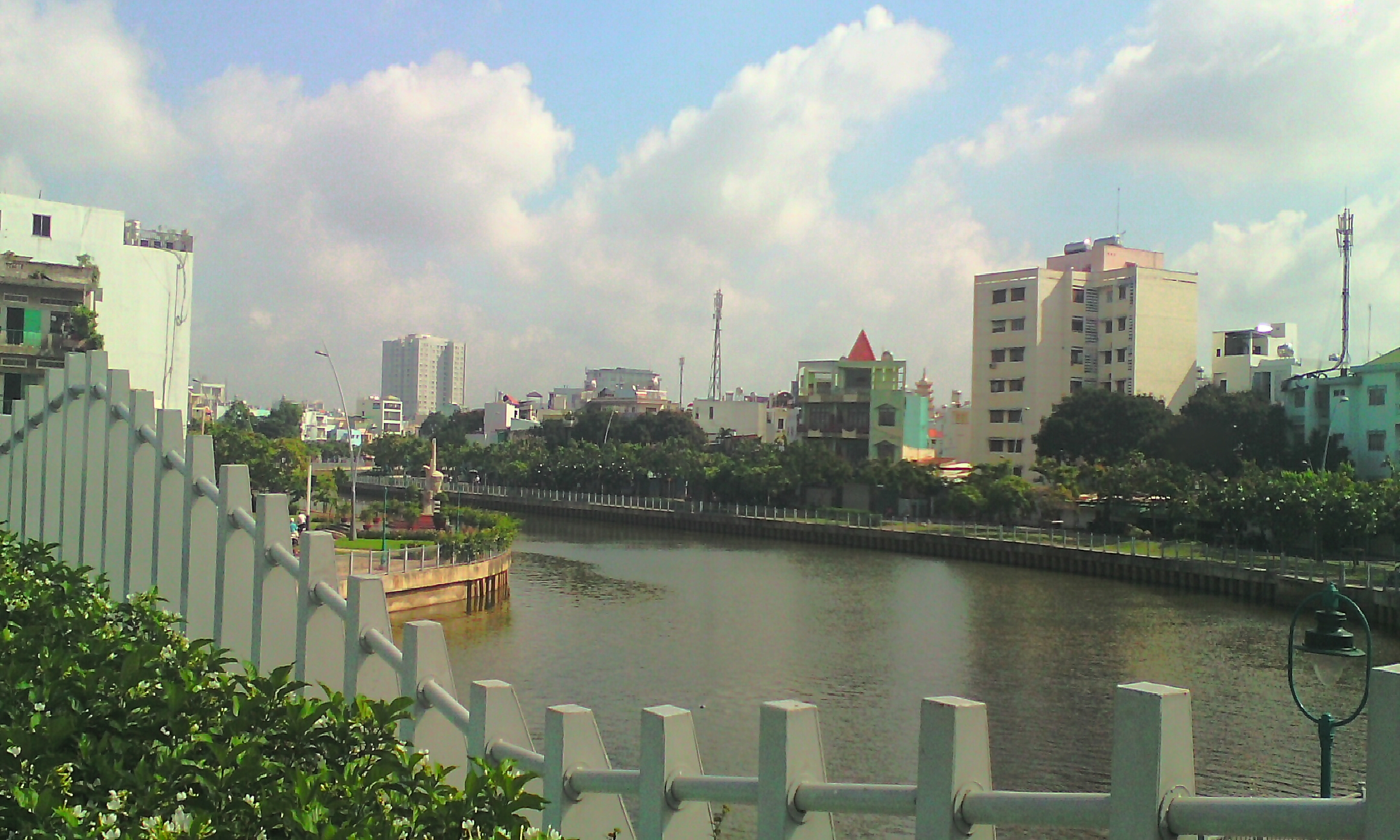
- View of Nhiêu Lộc - Thị Nghè Channel toward Tân Định from Kiệu Bridge
- Coordinates: 10°47′33″N 106°41′10″E
- Crosses: Nhiêu Lộc - Thị Nghè Channel
- Locale: Tân Định, Xuân Hòa, Cầu Kiệu, Phú Nhuận, Ho Chi Minh City
- Other name: Xóm Kiệu Bridge (Cầu Xóm Kiệu)
- Named for: Village of pickled Allium chinense

Location
- Interactive map of Kiệu Bridge

Kiệu Bridge is a bridge crosses the Nhiêu Lộc – Thị Nghè Channel in Ho Chi Minh City, connect Hai Bà Trưng Street in the southern bank of the canal at Tân Định and Xuân Hòa with Phan Đình Phùng Street in the northern bank at Cầu Kiệu and Phú Nhuận, Ho Chi Minh City.

== History ==
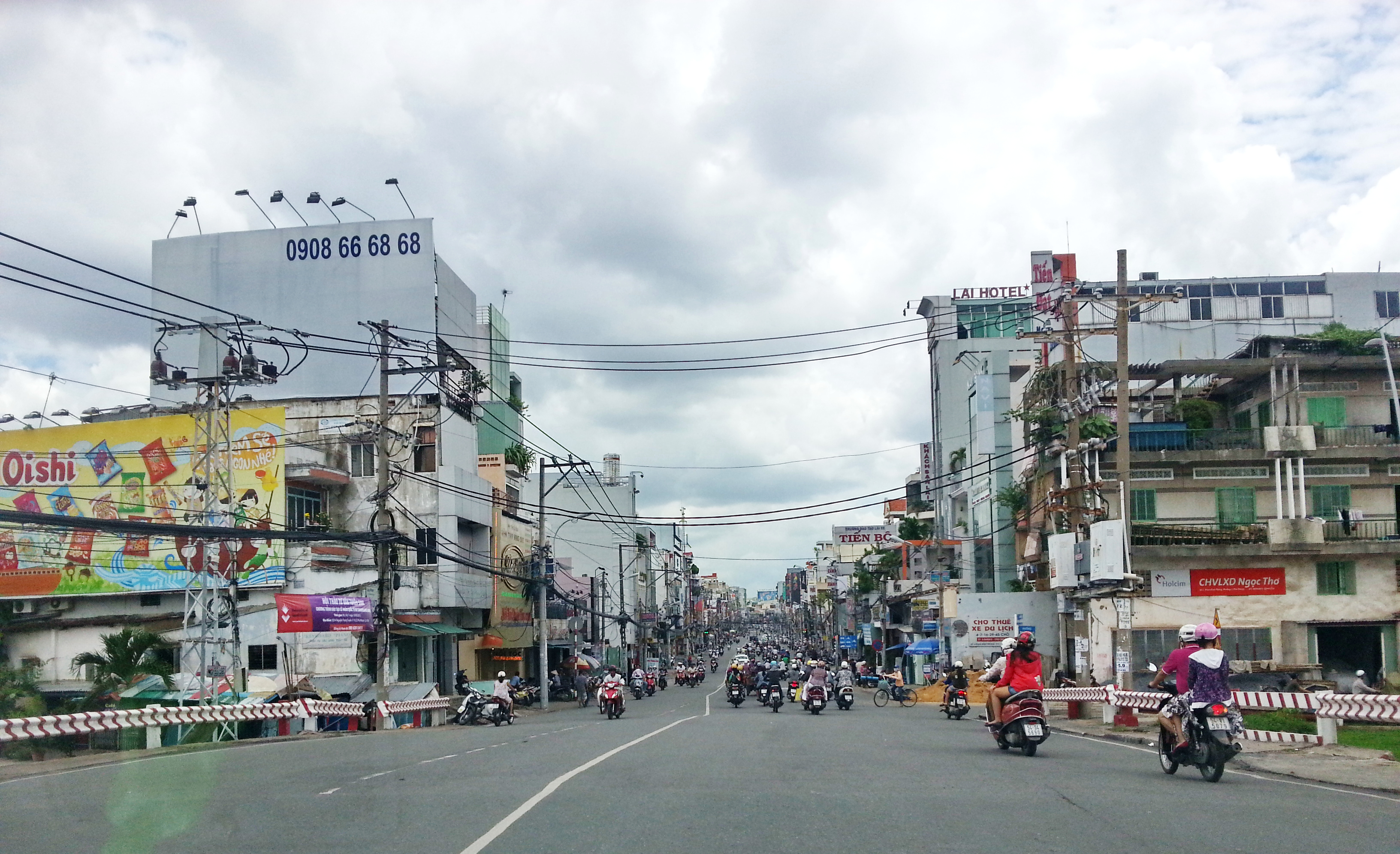
Kiệu Bridge before the renovation

Kiệu Bridge is one of the oldest bridge in history of Ho Chi Minh City. According to, Đại Nam nhất thống chí, Kiệu Bridge located in the historic Bình Dương district, Gia Định province, with 6 Zhàng length (about 24 meters) and built in Gia Long period. Scholar Trương Vĩnh Ký also noted about Bridge No. 3 (as it was the third bridge crosses the Thị Nghè Canal then, after Thị Nghè Bridge and Bông Bridge) or Bridge of Xóm Kiệu (means: Village of pickled Allium chinense) connects Tân Định with Xã Tài Market (an alternate name of Phú Nhuận Market in Phú Nhuận area).

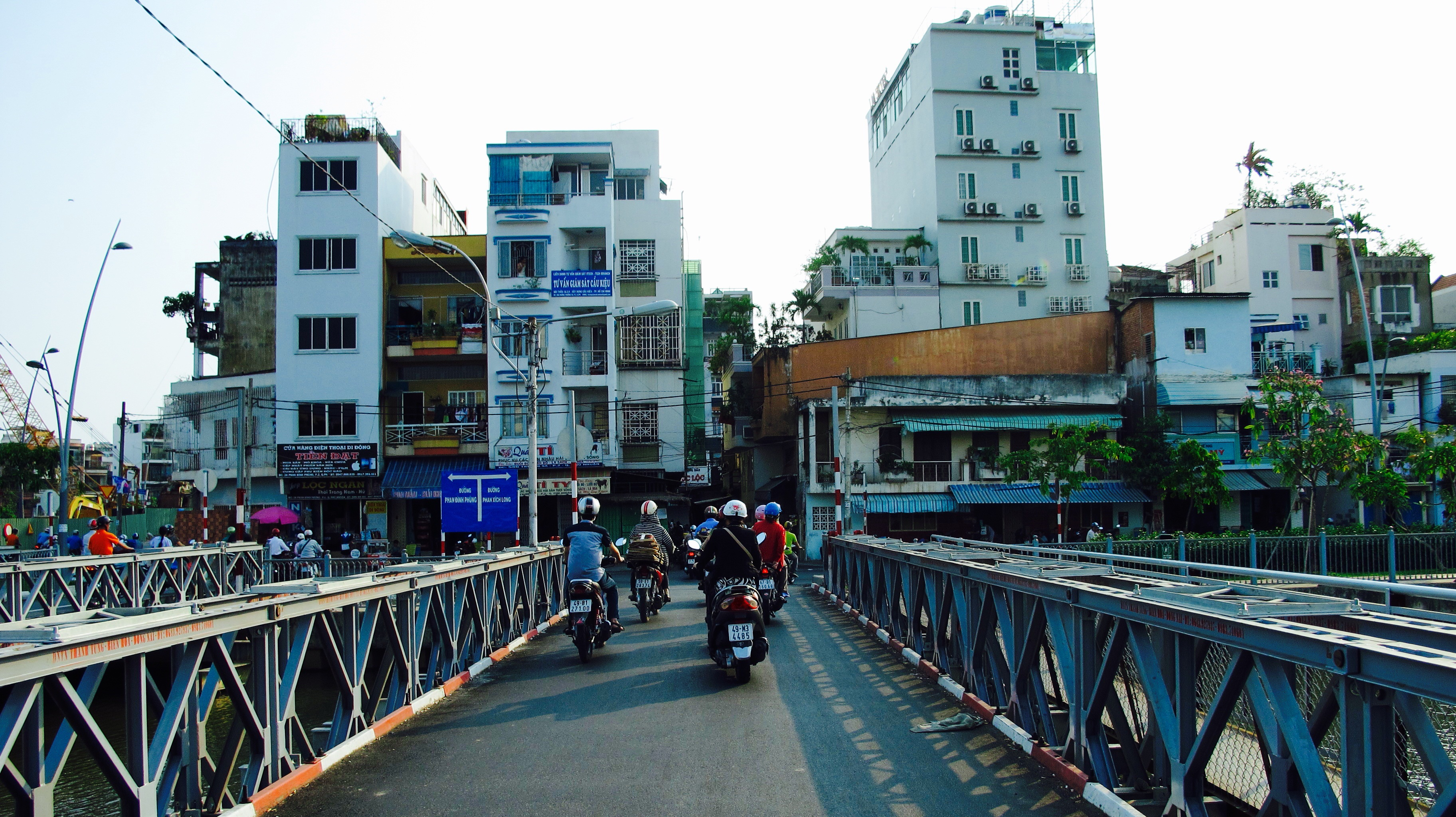
A temporary steel bridge being used as an institute for Kiệu Bridge under construction

Researcher Nguyễn Đình Tư described the landscape of Cầu Kiệu area in 1945 as follows: "In 1945, Cầu Kiệu was made of cement, wide enough for two lanes of traffic. On both sides were narrow sidewalks for pedestrians, paved with bricks, and the bridge had low iron railings. From the Saigon side of the bridge (the former District 1 and 3 area), the road was paved with asphalt. On the Phú Nhuận side, the road was a red dirt road. Both sides of the road were low-lying, with drainage ditches and two rows of shady banyan trees."

On February 4, 2014, Ho Chi Minh City government has ordered the closure of Kiệu Bridge for demolition and reconstruction. The new Kiệu Bridge has a length of 77.2 m, the project features a simple prestressed reinforced concrete beam structure combined with an underpass behind the abutment to allow smooth traffic flow on the new built Hoàng Sa and Trường Sa roads along the Nhieu Loc – Thi Nghe canal. The total investment for the project was 115 billion VND, and it was opened to traffic on January 1, 2015.

== See also ==
- Thị Nghè Bridge
- Bông Bridge
