= André Joyeux =

French painter

André Joyeux (1871–?) was a French artist, first teacher and director of the Gia Định art school (Trường Mỹ nghệ thực hành Gia Định) founded in 1913 in a suburb of Saigon, 12 years before Victor Tardieu founded the national EBAI in Hanoi. (Note: "Après André Joyeux, Jules Besson, Stéphane Brecq (dates non connues) est à son tour nommé au poste de directeur de l'école d'arts appliqués de Gia Dinh (1940-1942). Lorsqu'il arrive à ce poste, le peintre connaissait déjà l'Indochine ...") (Note: "M. André Joyeux a subi l'attraction irrésistible, au hasard de la destinée; on ne naît guère colonial, on le devient, et M. ... Plus de dessin ni de peinture, pendant dix ans — où s'exalte le besoin d'indépendance, où se magnifie la vision de la ...")

Joyeux studied architecture at the École nationale supérieure des Beaux-Arts in Paris, then, around 1900, went to Saigon, possibly as an architect. In Saigon he started to paint and draw; his pictures were exhibited at the Colonial Exhibition in Marseille in 1906. He then published a first book of caricatures satirising the colons (his fellow colonial French), as Silhouettes Saigonnaises (22 plates, Saigon, 1909), then in 1912 a larger book of cartoons and text entitled La Vie large des colonies (Paris: Maurice Bauche, 1912), since translated into English as "The Colonial Good Life." He also illustrated several more serious books for other authors. In 1911 Joyeux was appointed principal Inspecteur des Ecoles d'Art Decorative de l'Cochinchine, and in 1913 founded the School of Applied Arts in Gia Dinh. Joyeux continued at the school till 1926, being followed by Jules Besson and Stéphane Brecq. By 1943 160 students had graduated from the school. The school was merged with Ho Chi Minh City Fine Arts University in 1971.
