= Conservatory of Ho Chi Minh City =

Music conservatory in Vietnam

Music Conservatory of Ho Chi Minh City
- Nhạc viện Thành phố Hồ Chí Minh
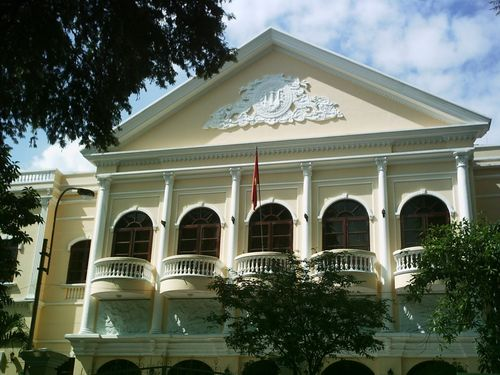
- Former names: Trường Quốc gia Âm nhạc; Trường Quốc gia Âm nhạc và Kịch nghệ
- Type: Public conservatory
- Established: April 12, 1956; 70 years ago
- Affiliations: Ministry of Culture, Sports and Tourism
- President: Hoàng Ngọc Long
- Vice-president: Nguyễn Mỹ Hạnh; Huỳnh Thị Thu Hiền
- Location: 112 Nguyễn Du Street, Bến Thành Ward, District 1, Ho Chi Minh City, Vietnam; 10°46′27.1″N 106°41′42.3″E
- Campus: Urban
- Website: www.hcmcons.vn

The Music Conservatory of Ho Chi Minh City (Vietnamese: Nhạc viện Thành phố Hồ Chí Minh) is a conservatory in Ho Chi Minh City, Vietnam that provides music education in undergraduate, graduate and postgraduate level for the southern region of Vietnam. It is one of three conservatories in Vietnam (besides Hanoi Conservatory of Music and Hue Conservatory).

== History ==
Historically, the precursor of this university was Music Division of Gia Định College of Fine Arts (simply called Gia Định Art College, predecessor of Ho Chi Minh City University of Fine Arts). In 1956, this division is split from Gia Định Art College to become National Conservatory of Music. When the dramatics faculty was added to the school education programme, this school was renamed National Music and Dramatics School with 2 main education fields: music (European music and Vietnamese national music or Vietnamese traditional music) and dramatics (principally Vietnamese traditional dramatics).

After the Fall of Saigon on April 30, 1975, the school was renamed Ho Chi Minh City National Music School. The dramatics division was split to establish Ho Chi Minh City Dramatics School (today University of Theatre and Cinema Ho Chi Minh City) in 1976.

From 1978, the dancing education program was added to the school education scope. On February 2, 1980, the school was given university status by the Vietnamese government and was renamed Ho Chi Minh City Conservatory.

== Training programmes ==
The schools scope of education includes the following courses:

- Long-term Intermediate Degree (in 6; 7 or 9 years for students from 9 years old or above).
- Short-term Intermediate Degree (in 4 years for students from 15 to 24 years old).
- Bachelor in 4 years (for students from 18 years old or above).
- Master in 2 years.
- Doctorate in 3 years

== Faculties ==
- Theory, music composition and conducting.
- Piano
- Symphony Musical Instrument including string (violon, violoncelle, violonalto, contrebasse), clarinet (Flute, Hautbois, Clarinet, Basson, Cor, Trompette, Trombone, Tuba) and Percussion.
- Vocal singing
- Vietnamese Traditional Musical Instrument (two-chord fiddle, monochord, 36-chord zither, bamboo flute).
- Guitar, mandolin, accordion.

== Organization ==
There are over 100 lecturers, many of which are famous musicians, composers and researchers, and experienced pedagogogists graduated from European conservatoires in world's most famous music centres (including Russia, Eastern European countries, the United Kingdom, France, Italy, and Germany). The conservatoire tends to teach classical music schools for their students. Apart from the education program, the conservatoire hold some orchestras:

- A symphony orchestra
- An adult orchestra
- A child orchestra
- A Vietnamese traditional orchestra
- Guitar, Mandoline, Accordéon (GMAC) orchestra

There are two concert rooms (500 seats and 100 seats respectively) with two performances weekly Many of the conservatoire graduates has become famous singers and composers in the country. The conservatoire has won many medals and awards nationally and internationally, namely:

- Award at J.B.Bach International Concours in Leipzig, Germany in 1980
- Two first awards in National Concours in 1986
- Autumne Concours in 1993: Violon first award (adult), violon second award (children)

The conservatoire has been awarded several Labor Medals by Vietnamese presidents
