= Ministry of Culture, Sports and Tourism (Vietnam) =

Government ministry of Vietnam

Socialist Republic of Vietnam Ministry of Culture, Sports and Tourism

Ministry overview
- Formed: 28 August 1945
- Preceding Ministry: Ministry of Information and Propaganda (1945-1946); Ministry of Propaganda (1946); General Bureau of Information and Propaganda, Ministry of Home Affairs (1946); Bureau of Information (1946-1952); Bureau of Propaganda and Culture (1952-1954); Ministry of Propaganda (1954-1955); Ministry of Culture (1955-1977); Ministry of Culture and Information (1977-1981); Ministry of Culture (1981-1990) Ministry of Culture, Information, Sports and Tourism (1990-1991); Ministry of Culture, Information and Sports (1991-1992); Ministry of Culture and Information (1992-2007); Ministry of Culture, Sports and Tourism (2007-)
- Type: Government Ministry
- Jurisdiction: Government of Vietnam
- Headquarters: 51 Ngô Quyền Street, Hanoi
- Annual budget: 3,563.75 billion VND (2026)
- Minister responsible: Lâm Thị Phương Thanh
- Deputy Minister responsible: Nguyễn Huy Dũng; Trịnh Thị Thủy; Tạ Quang Đông; Hoàng Đạo Cương; Hồ An Phong
- Website: www.bvhttdl.gov.vn

The Ministry of Culture, Sports and Tourism is the government ministry in Vietnam responsible for state administration on culture, family, sports and tourism nationwide, in addition to the management of public services in those fields. It was founded in 2007 after the merger of the Committee of Physical Training and Sports of Vietnam, General Department of Tourism, and the Culture section from the Ministry of Culture and Information.

== Educational institutions ==
Educational and training institutions affiliated with the ministry are:

=== Universities ===
These institutions offer Bachelor's and postgraduate degrees.

Institution	Native name	Location
Vietnam Academy of Dance	Học viện Múa Việt Nam	Hanoi
Danang Sport University	Trường Đại học Thể dục thể thao Đà Nẵng	Da Nang
Vietnam National Academy of Music	Học viện Âm nhạc Quốc gia Việt Nam	Hanoi
Ho Chi Minh City Conservatory	Nhạc viện Thành phố Hồ Chí Minh	Ho Chi Minh City
Hue Academy of Music [vi]	Học viện Âm nhạc Huế	Huế
Hanoi University of Culture [vi]	Trường Đại học Văn hoá Hà Nội	Hanoi
Ho Chi Minh City University of Culture	Trường Đại học Văn hoá Thành phố Hồ Chí Minh	Ho Chi Minh City
Vietnam University of Fine Arts	Trường Đại học Mỹ thuật Việt Nam	Hanoi
Ho Chi Minh City University of Fine Arts	Trường Đại học Mỹ thuật Thành phố Hồ Chí Minh	Ho Chi Minh City
The University of Theatre and Cinema Hanoi [vi]	Trường Đại học Sân khấu - Điện ảnh Hà Nội	Hanoi
The University of Theatre and Cinema Ho Chi Minh City	Trường Đại học Sân khấu - Điện ảnh Thành phố Hồ Chí Minh	Ho Chi Minh City
Ho Chi Minh City University of Sport	Trường Đại học Thể dục thể thao Thành phố Hồ Chí Minh	Ho Chi Minh City
Bac Ninh University of Sport [vi]	Trường Đại học Thể dục Thể thao Bắc Ninh	Bắc Ninh

=== Colleges ===
These colleges award associate degrees, which would be equivalent to diplomas in some countries and below the level of Bachelor’s degrees.

Institution	Native name	Location
Da Lat Tourism College	Trường Cao đẳng Du lịch Đà Lạt	Da Lat
Cantho Tourism College	Trường Cao đẳng Du lịch Cần Thơ	Cần Thơ
Nhatrang Tourism College	Trường Cao đẳng Du lịch Nha Trang	Nha Trang
Tay Bac College of Culture and Arts	Trường Cao đẳng Văn hoá nghệ thuật Tây Bắc	Phú Thọ
Viet Bac College of Culture and Arts	Trường Cao đẳng Văn hoá Nghệ thuật Việt Bắc	Thái Nguyên
Hanoi Tourism College	Trường Cao đẳng Du lịch Hà Nội	Hanoi
Dong Nai College of Decorative Arts	Trường Cao đẳng Mỹ thuật trang trí Đồng Nai	Đồng Nai
Hue Tourism College	Trường Cao đẳng Du lịch Huế	Huế
Haiphong Tourism College	Trường Cao đẳng Du lịch Hải Phòng	Haiphong
Vung Tau Tourism College	Trường Cao đẳng Du lịch Vũng Tàu	Vũng Tàu
Danang Tourism College	Trường Cao đẳng Du lịch Đà Nẵng	Da Nang

=== Intermediate schools ===
These institutions award intermediate diplomas (Vietnamese: bằng trung cấp), which is above high school diplomas but below associate degrees (awarded by colleges).

Institution	Native name	Location
Ho Chi Minh City Intermediate Dance School	Trường Trung cấp Múa thành phố Hồ Chí Minh	Ho Chi Minh City
Vietnam Intermediate School of Circus and Variety Showmanship	Trường Trung cấp Nghệ thuật Xiếc và Tạp kỹ Việt Nam	Hanoi
