= Gia Định =

Gia Định Phường Gia Định Bình Hòa, Bà Chiểu
- Ward
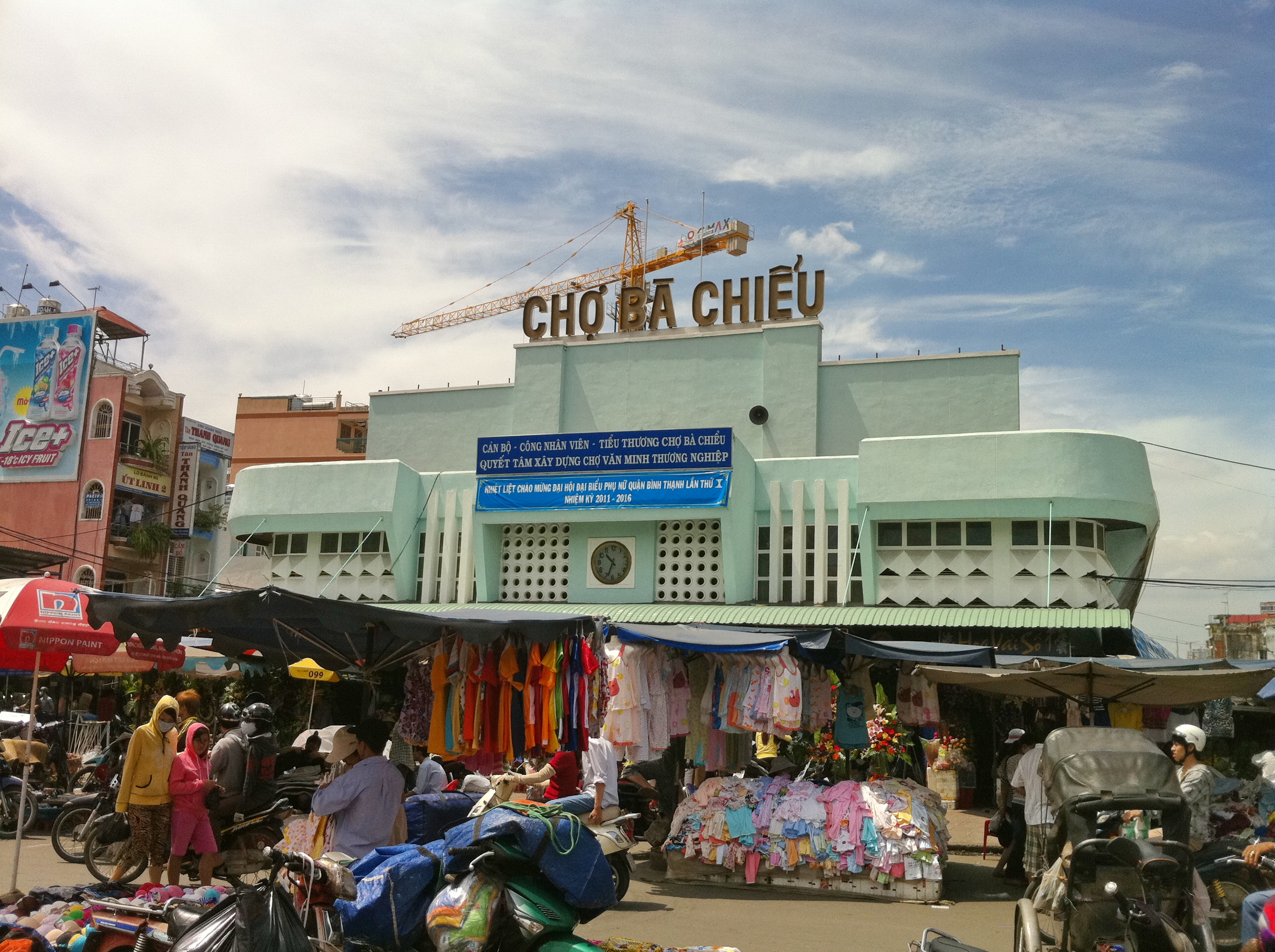
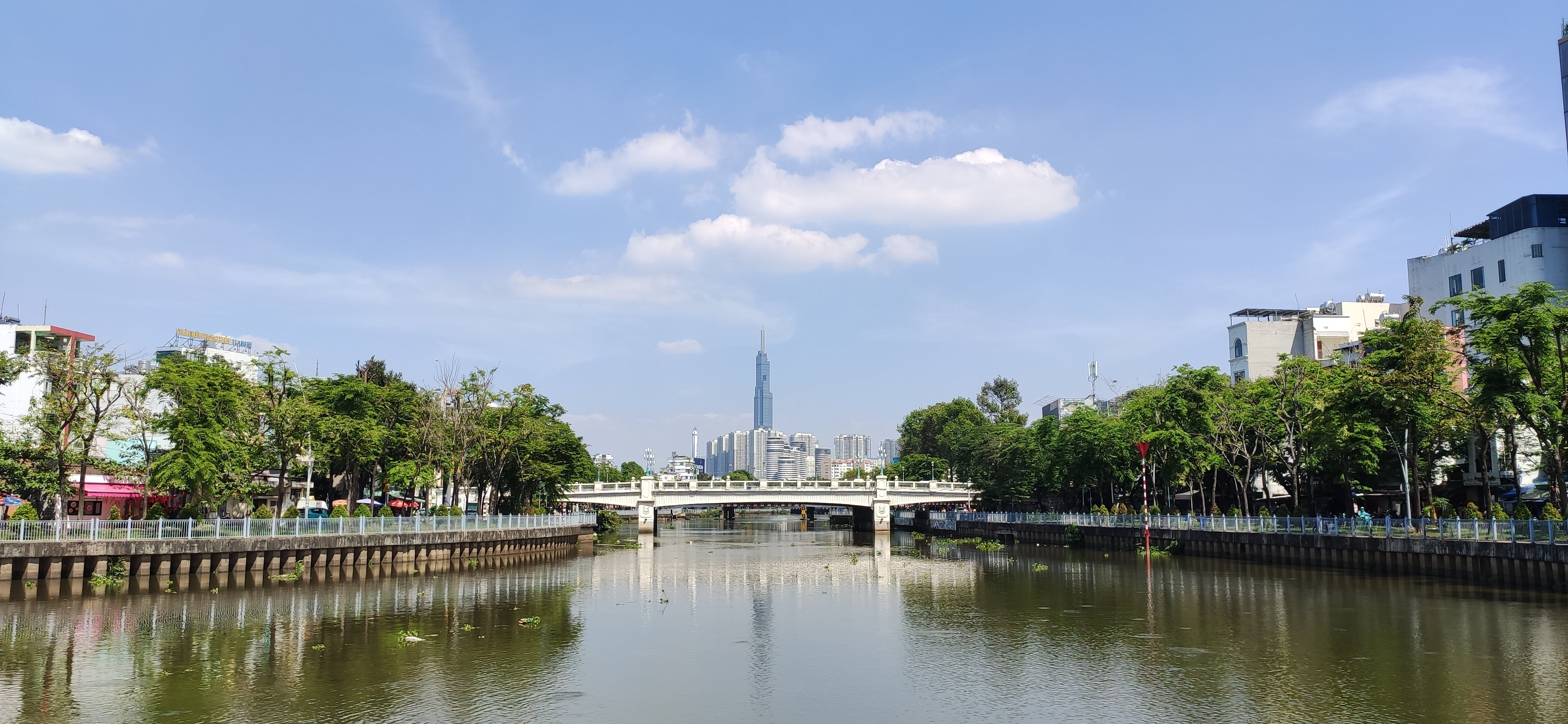
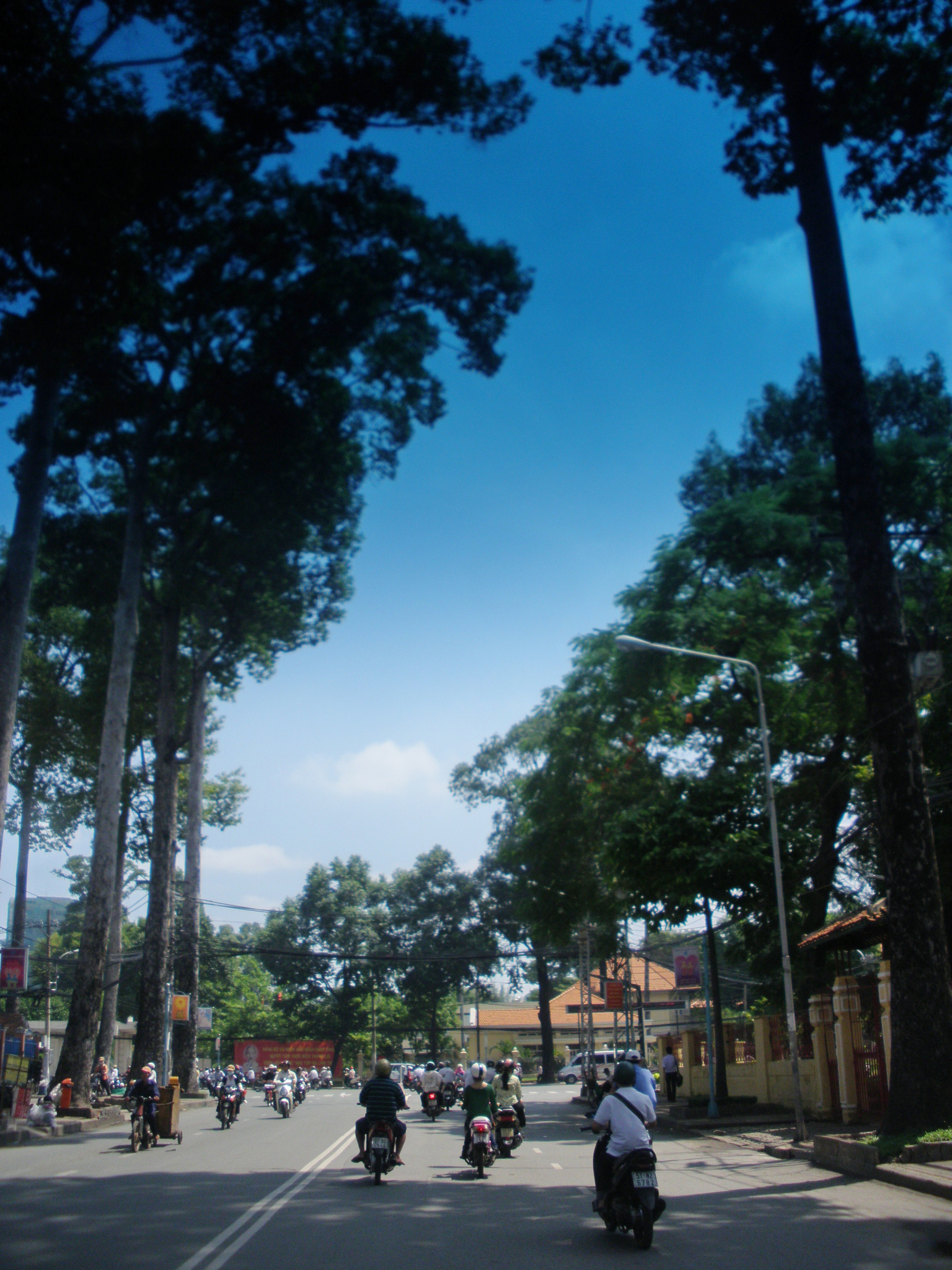
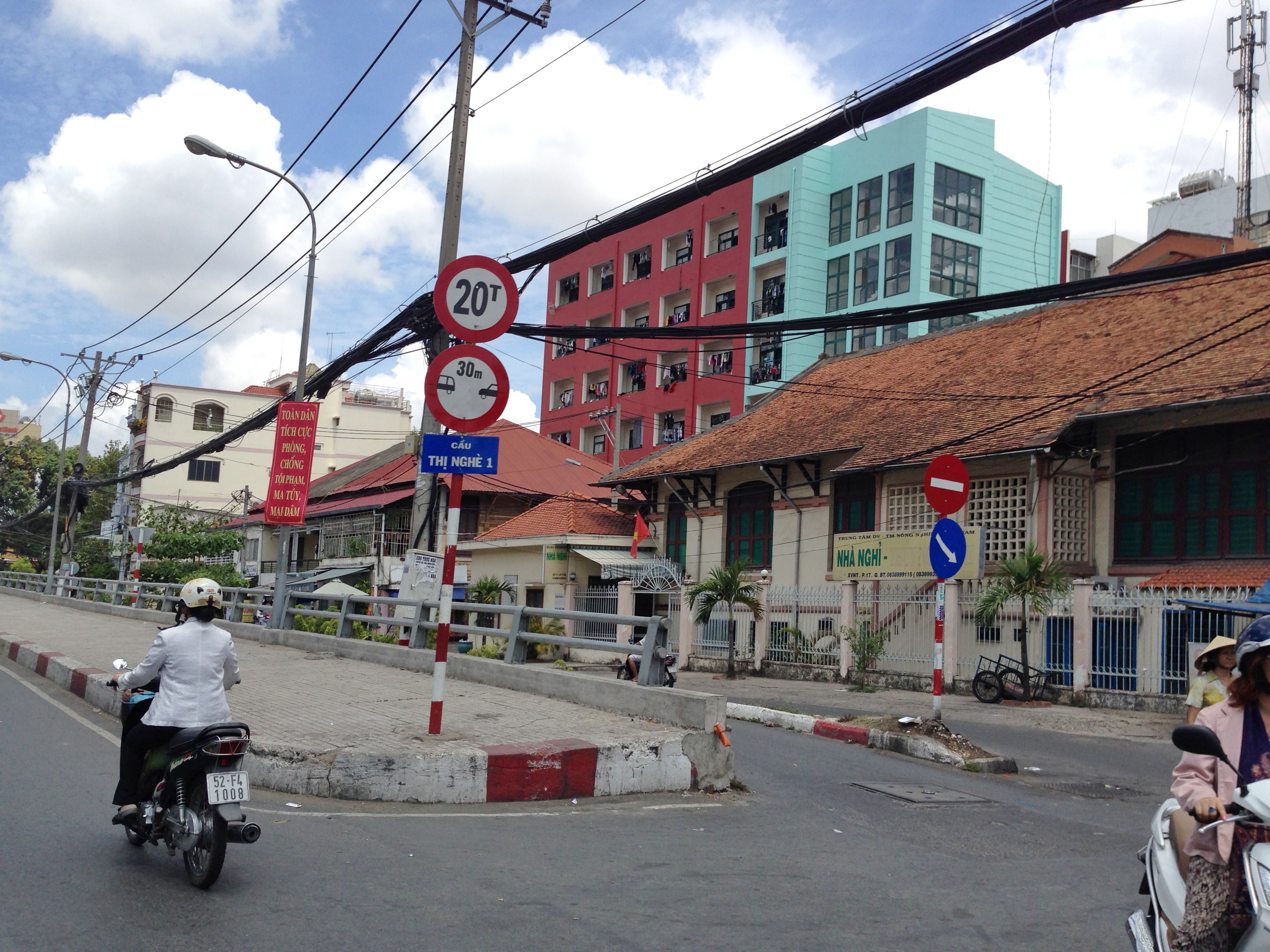
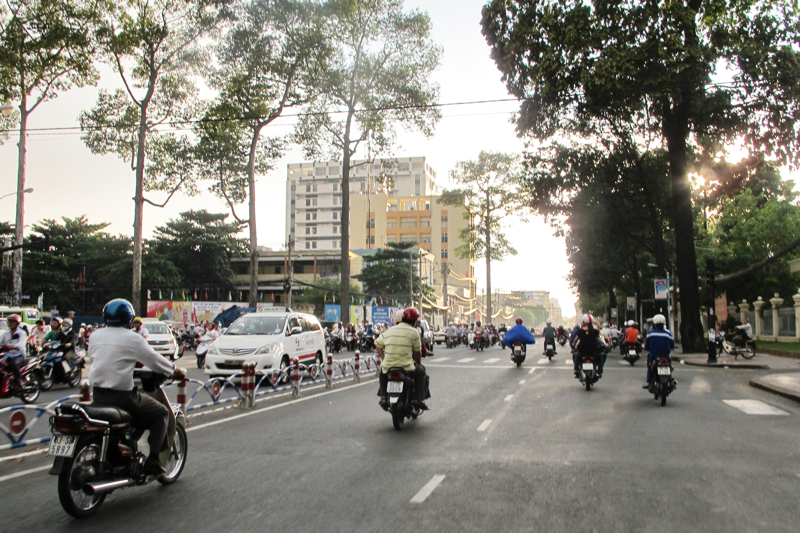
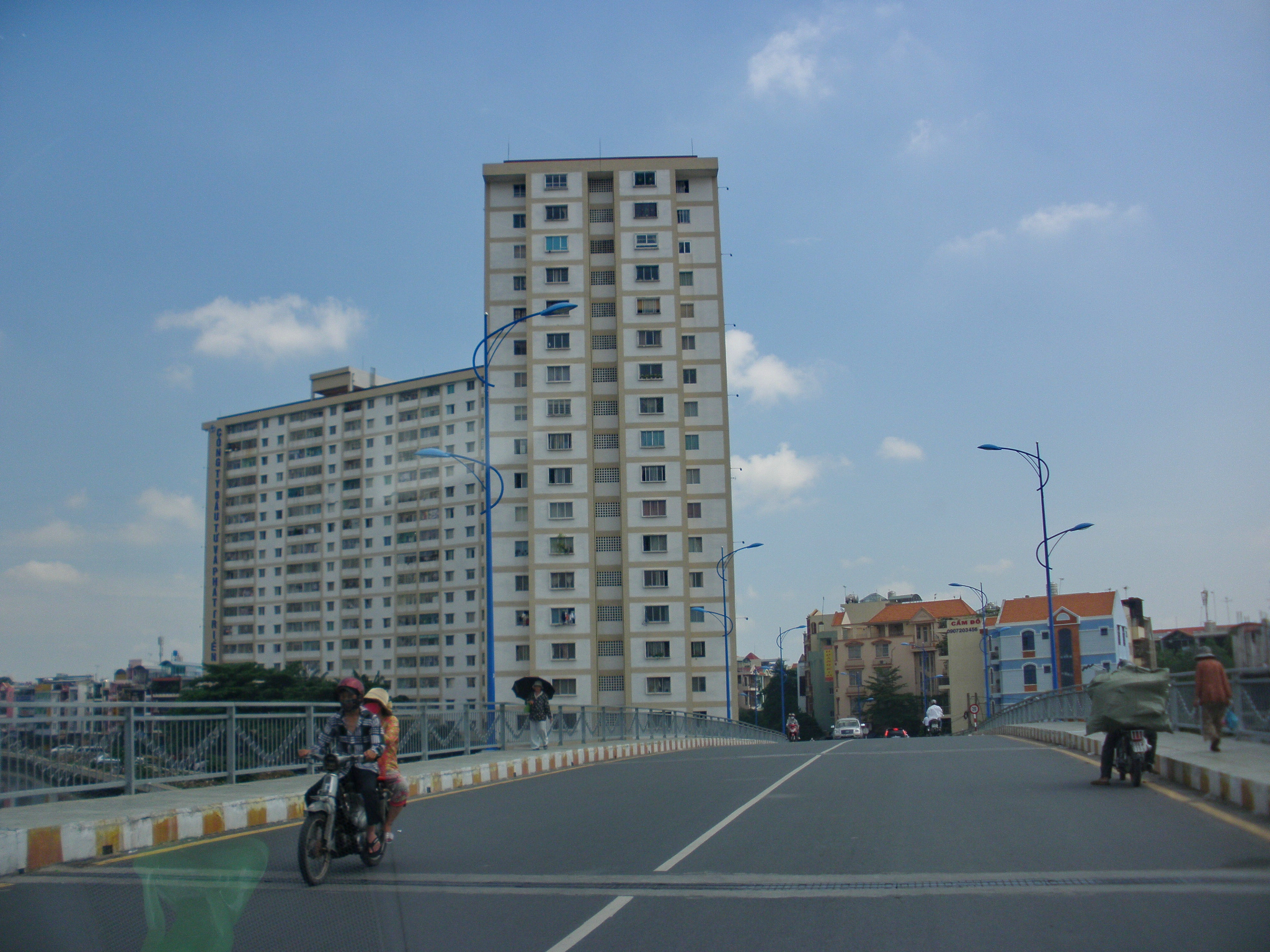
- From left to right: Bà Chiểu Market, Bông Bridge, Lê Văn Duyệt Tomb on the same name boulevard, Thị Nghè Bridge with Thủy Lợi University, Phan Đăng Lưu Boulevard, Miếu Nổi Apartment

- Seal
- Interactive map of Gia Định
- Coordinates: 10°47′54″N 106°41′49″E
- Country: Vietnam
- Municipality: Ho Chi Minh City
- Established: June 16, 2025

Area
  - Total: 1.07 sq mi (2.76 km^{2})

Population (2024)
  - Total: 125,946
  - Density: 118,000/sq mi (45,600/km^{2})
- Time zone: UTC+07:00 (Indochina Time)
- Administrative code: 26944

Gia Định (Vietnamese: Phường Gia Định) is a ward of Ho Chi Minh City, Vietnam. It is one of the 168 new wards, communes and special zones of the city following the reorganization in 2025.

== Geography ==
Ward of is located in the north of the central core of Ho Chi Minh City, bordering:

- Thạnh Mỹ Tây ward to the east, separated by Xô Viết Nghệ Tĩnh Street;
- Đức Nhuận and Cầu Kiệu Ward to the west;
- Saigon and Tân Định wards to the south, separated by Nhieu Loc–Thi Nghe Channel;
- Bình Lợi Trung and Bình Thạnh wards to the north, separated by streets of Nguyễn Văn Đậu, Lê Quang Định, Nơ Trang Long and Phan Đăng Lưu – Bạch Đằng.

According to Official Dispatch No. 2896/BNV-CQĐP dated May 27, 2025 of the Ministry of Home Affairs, following the merger, Gia Định has a land area of 2.76 km², the population as of December 31, 2024 is 125,946 people, the population density is 45,632 people/km².

== History ==
Prior to the ward's establishment, Gia Định was the historic and colloquial Vietnamese name for almost area of the former Ho Chi Minh City as Province of Gia Định (Tỉnh Gia Định) throughout the Six Provinces of Southern Vietnam period. It was also the official name for a satellite province that completely encloses the capital city of the State of Vietnam (as Đô thành Sài Gòn-Chợ Lớn), the Republic of Vietnam (as Đô thành Sài Gòn), and being merged since the Republic of South Vietnam (as Thành phố Sài Gòn-Gia Định). Since the French Indochina, Gia Định was a colloquial name for the new downtown of the province next to Saigon as the city was separated from the province and being a municipality. The provincial capital of Gia Định is located in the Commune of Bình Hòa, Gò Vấp district, now corresponding with the wards of Gia Định and Bình Thạnh.

On June 16, 2025, the National Assembly Standing Committee issued Resolution No. 1685/NQ-UBTVQH15 on the arrangement of commune-level administrative units of Ho Chi Minh City in 2025 (effective from June 16, 2025). Accordingly, the entire land area and population of Ward 1, Ward 2, Ward 7 and Ward 17 of Bình Thạnh district will be integrated into a new ward named Gia Định (Clause 42, Article 1).

== Healthcare ==
List of major hospitals in the ward:

- Nhân Dân Gia Định General Hospital (or Gia Định People Hospital)
- Bình Thạnh General Hospital

== Education ==
=== Schools ===
Schools with "*" means that there was originally one institution which was then split into two

- Gia Định Special Education School
- Hoàng Hoa Thám High School
- Võ Thị Sáu High School
- Trương Công Định Secondary School
- Điện Biên Secondary School
- Hà Huy Tập Primary and Secondary School*
- Lam Sơn Primary and Secondary School*
- Hồng Hà Primary School
- Tô Vĩnh Diện Primary School
- Lê Đình Chính Primary School
- Bế Văn Đàn Primary School

=== Higher educations ===
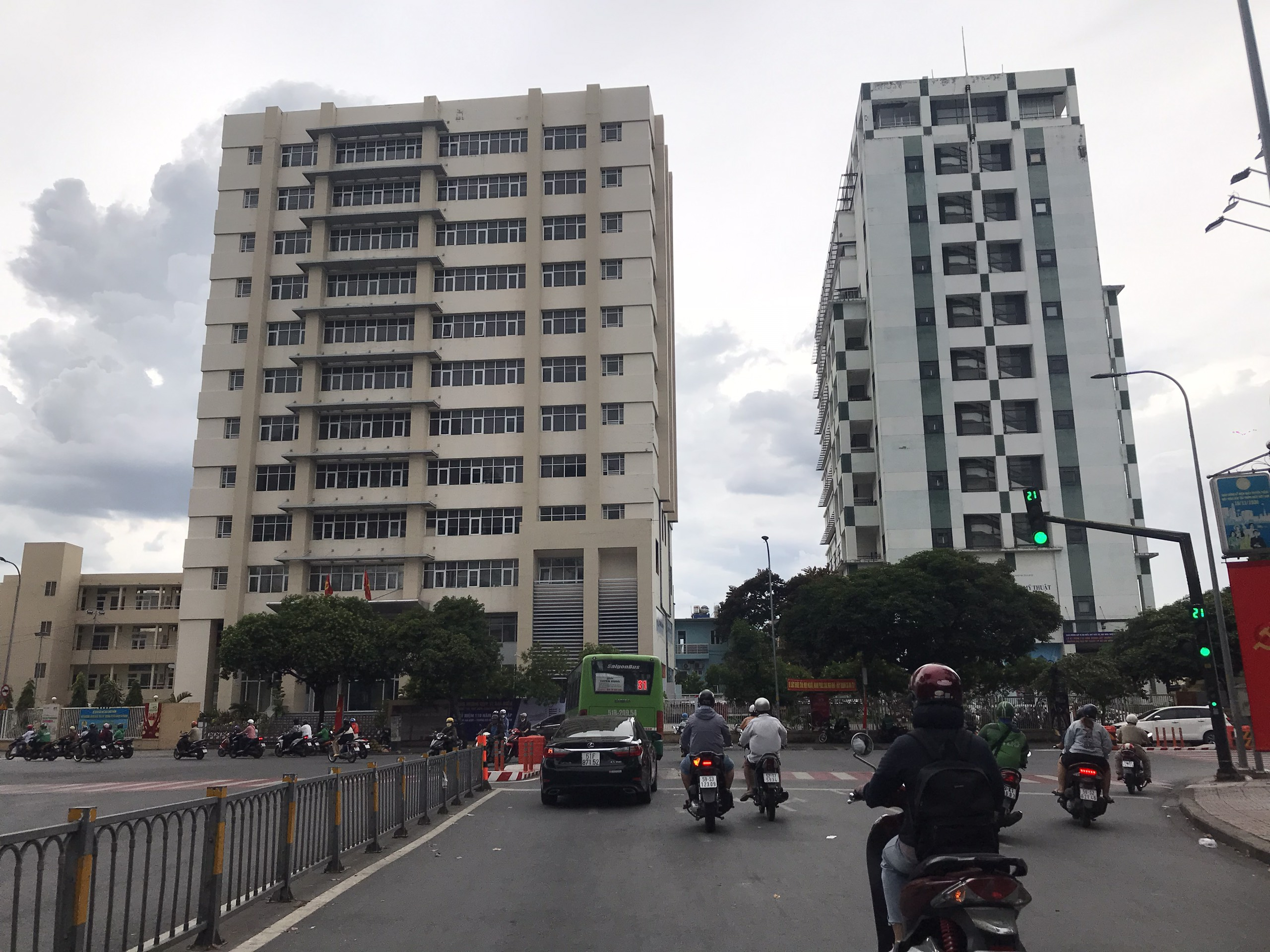
Ho Chi Minh City University of Fine Arts, the oldest higher institution in the ward

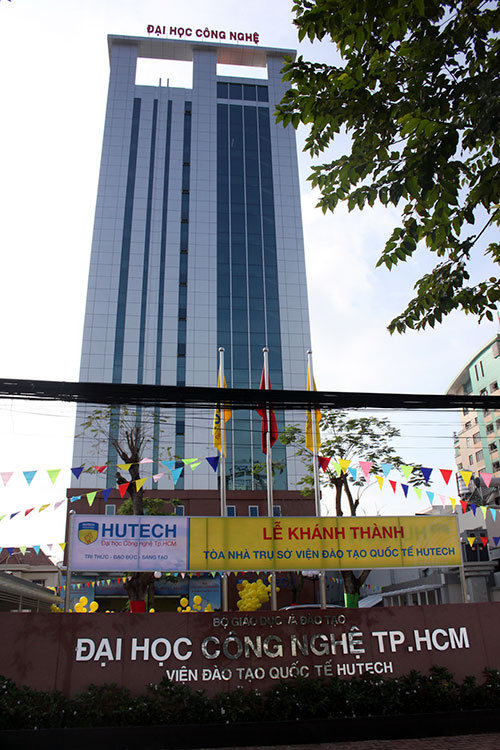
School of Health Sciences, Ho Chi Minh City University of Technology (HUTECH), one of the first private university in Ho Chi Minh City

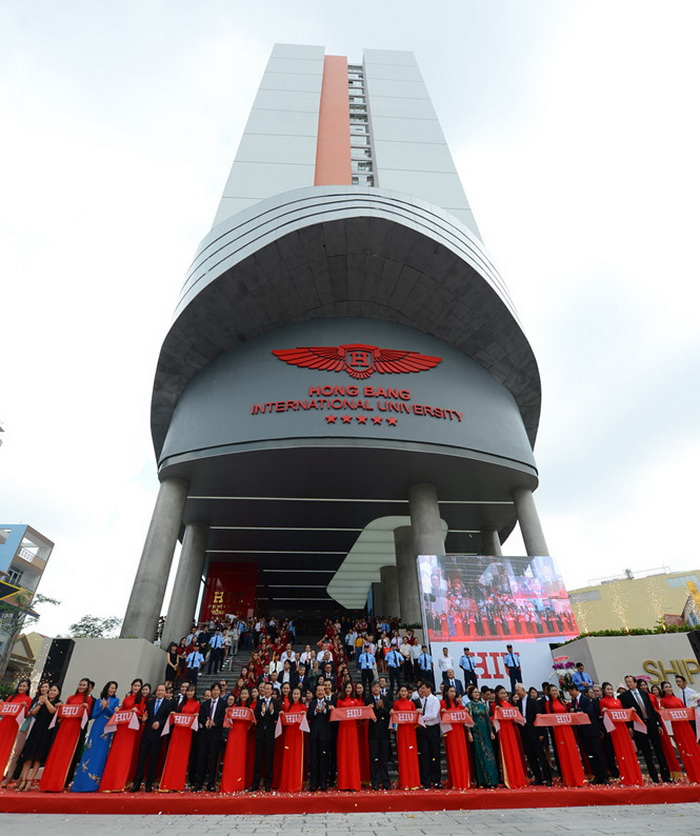
Hồng Bàng International University – Campus 1, Ship of Knowledge Building

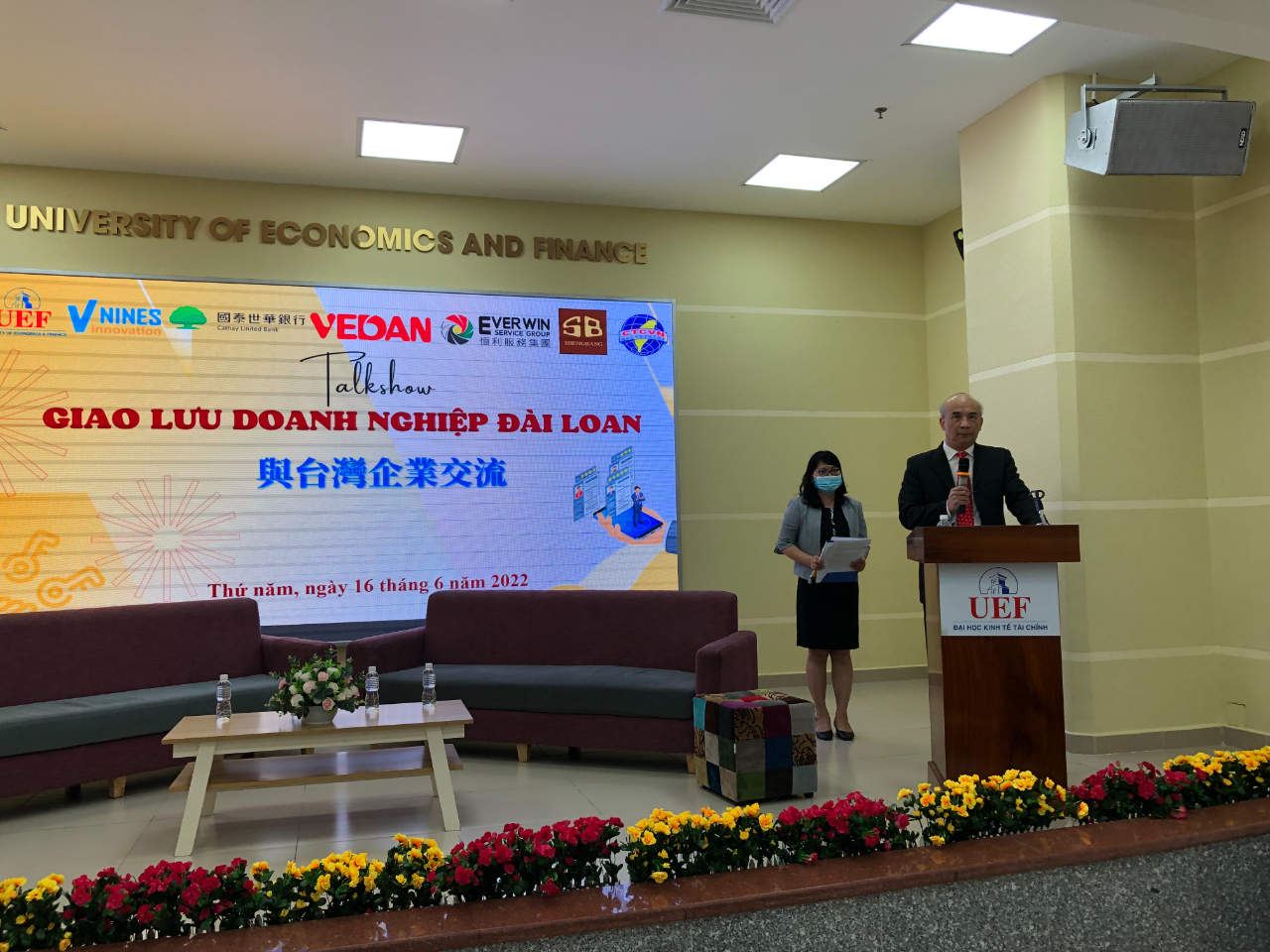
Liberty Hall at Level 15 of Ho Chi Minh City University of Economics and Finance, Campus A
- Thuyloi University – Southern Campus
- Ho Chi Minh City University of Fine Arts
- Ho Chi Minh City University of Technology (Note: The private university not the same name institution of VNU-HCM system) – School of Health Sciences,
- Ho Chi Minh City University of Economics and Finance
- Hong Bang International University – Campus 1

== Gallery with notable tourist sights ==
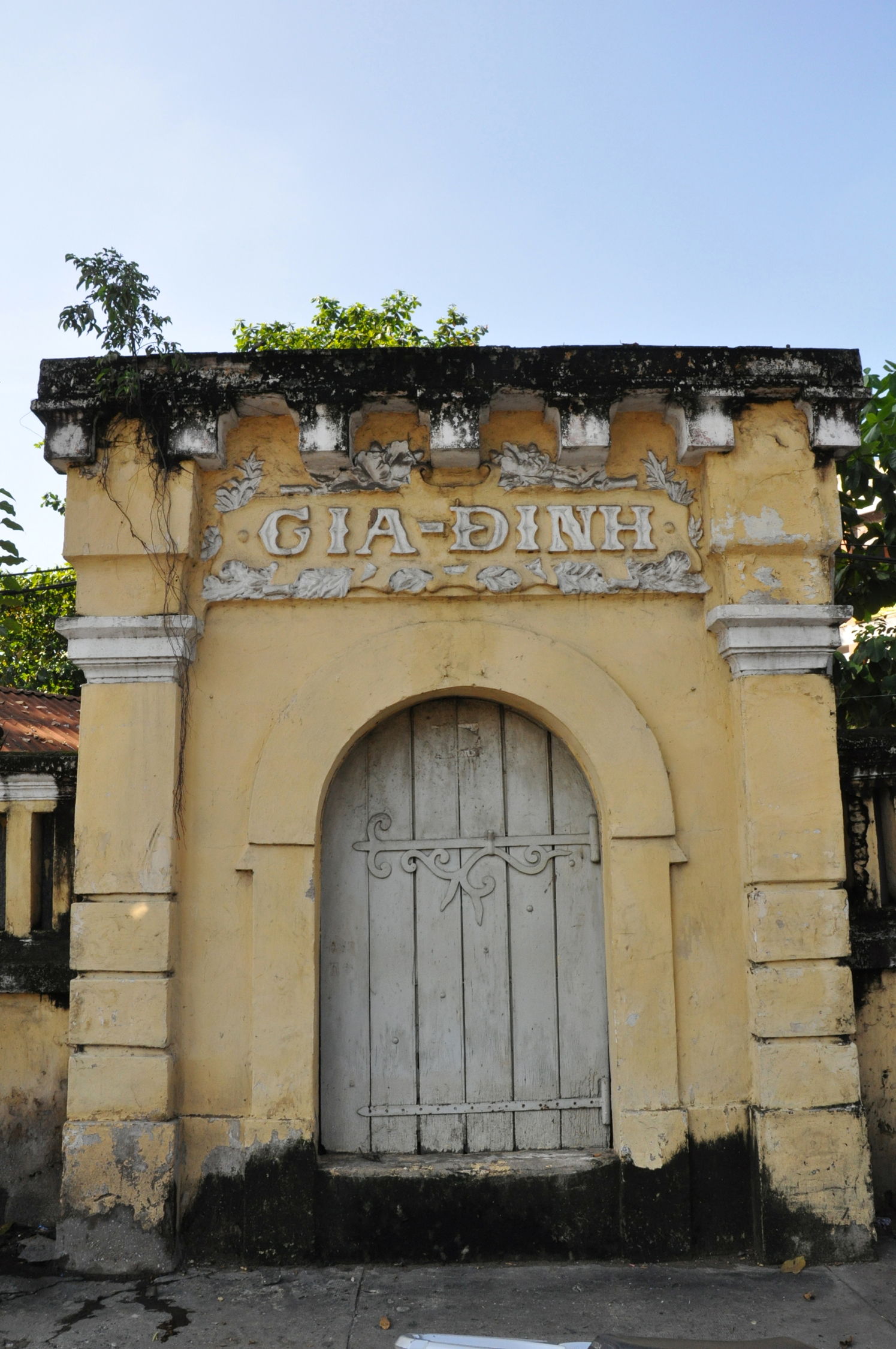
An old gate engraved the name "Gia-Định" outside Trương Công Định Secondary School

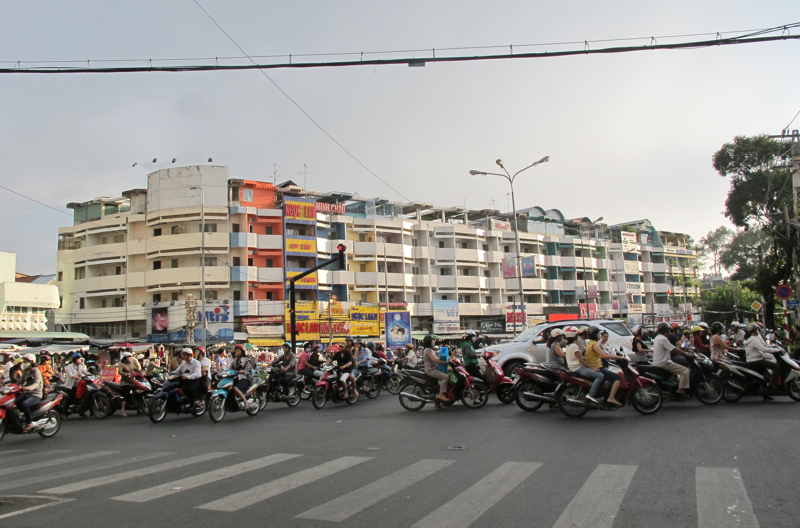
Row of shophouses next to Bà Chiểu Market on Phan Đăng Lưu Boulevard

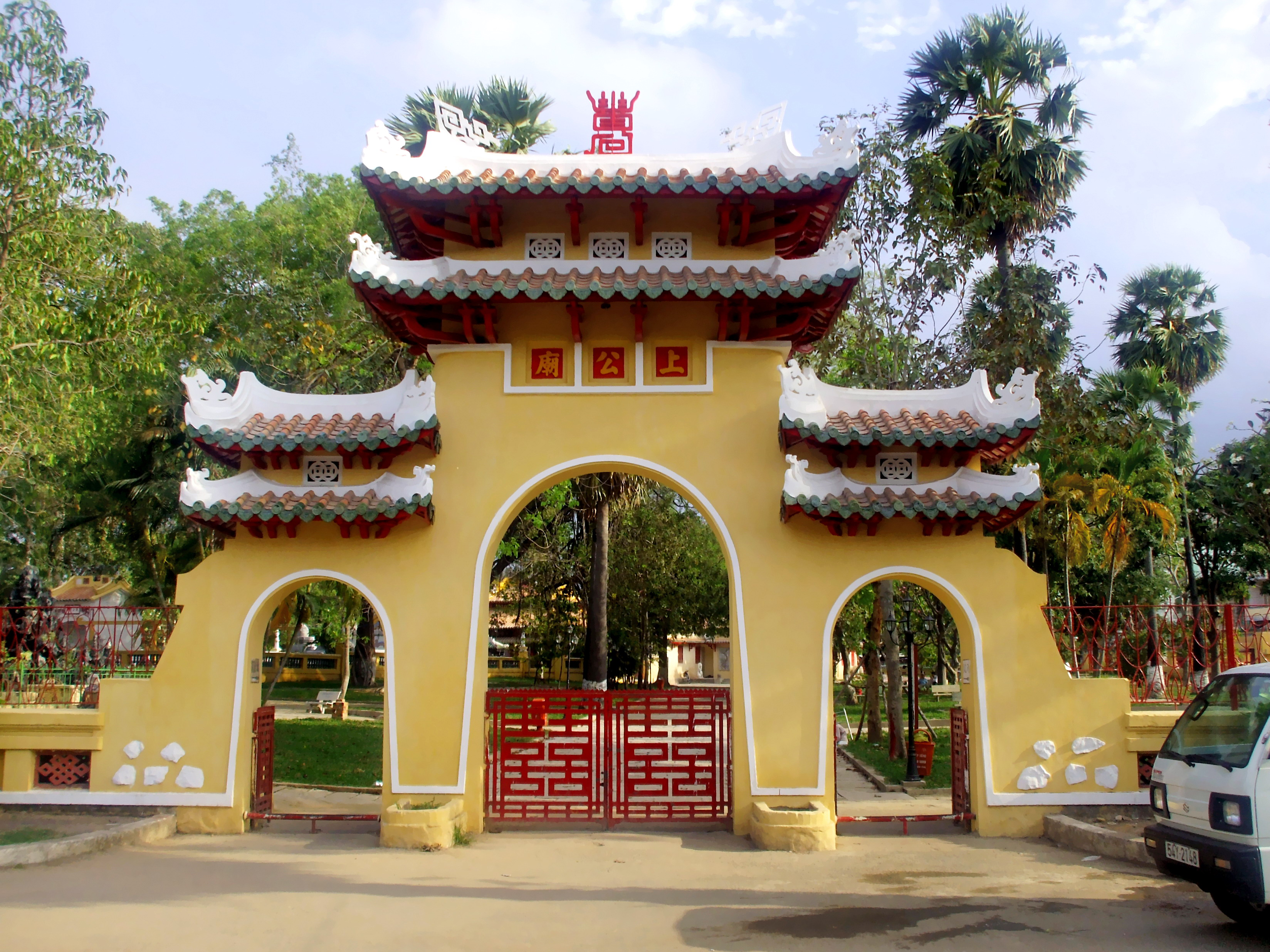
Main gate of Tomb of Lê Văn Duyệt on Vũ Tùng Street

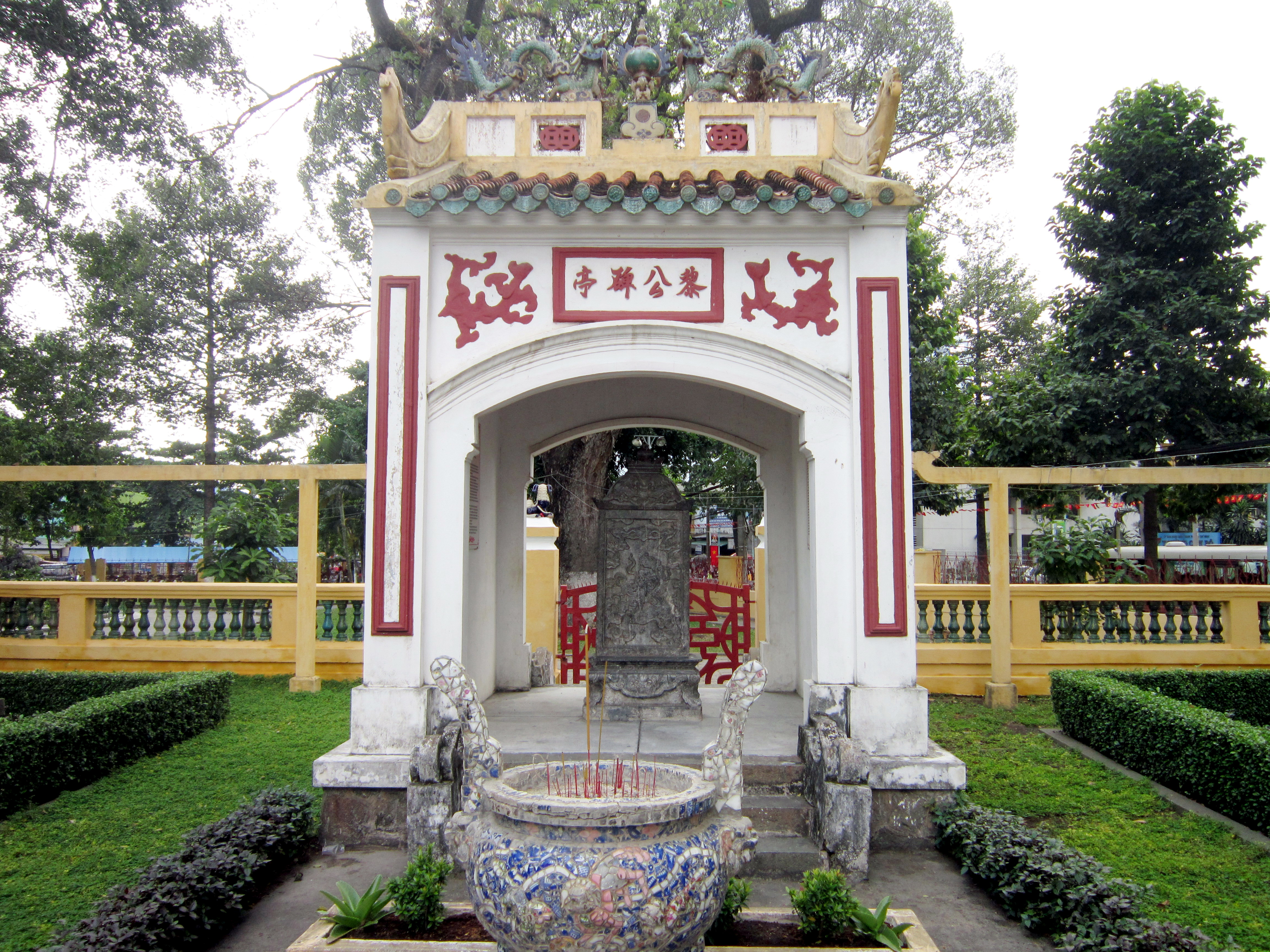
Tombstone house inside the Tomb of Lê Văn Duyệt

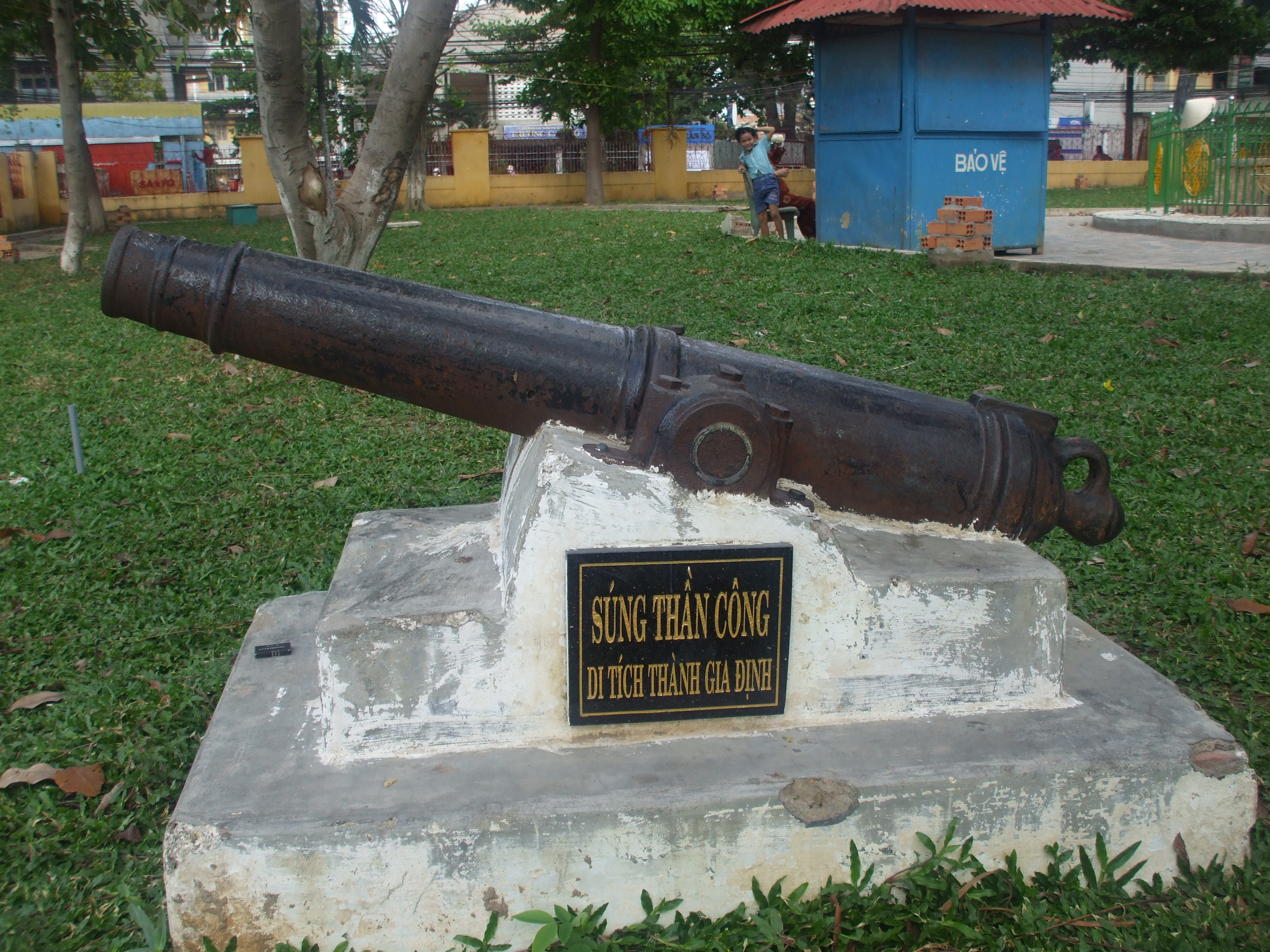
Cannon - a relics of Gia Định Citadel

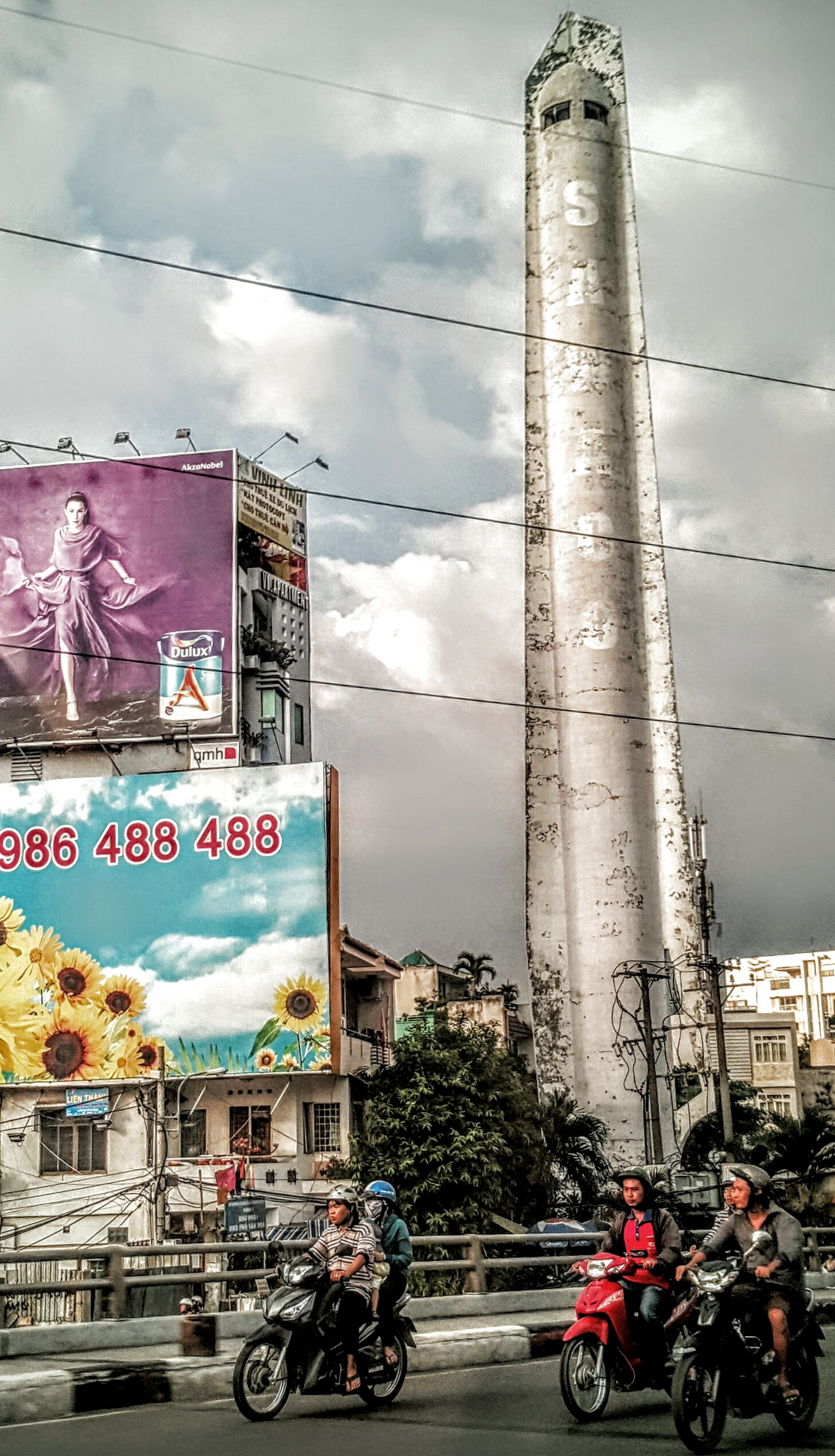
SAWACO Surge Tower, it was referred to as a "rocket tower" due to its shape
