= Nhiêu Lộc =

Nhiêu Lộc Phường Nhiêu Lộc
- Ward
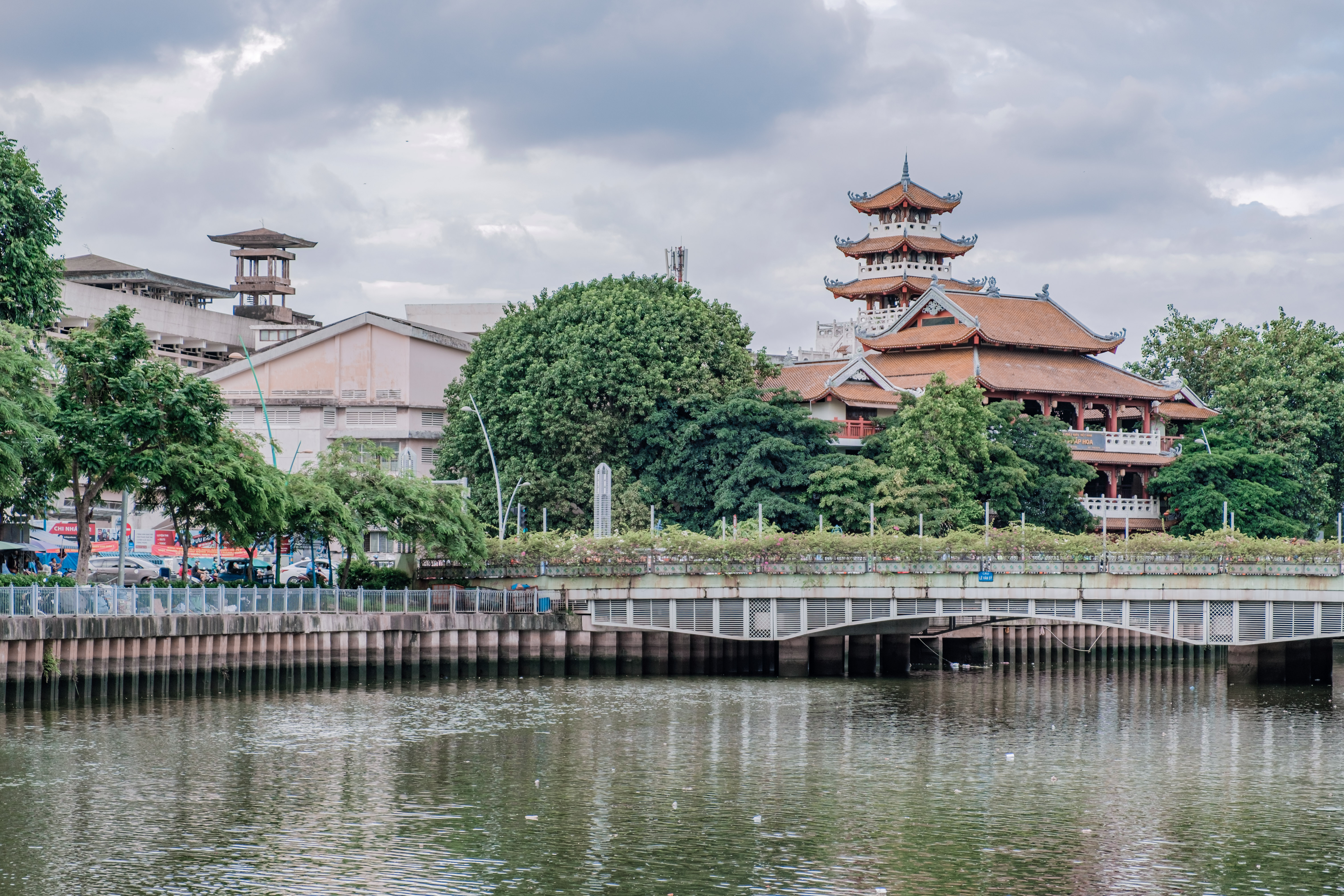
- Pháp Hoa Pagoda
- Interactive map of Nhiêu Lộc
- Coordinates: 10°46′57″N 106°40′45″E
- Country: Vietnam
- Municipality: Ho Chi Minh City
- Established: June 16, 2025

Area
  - Total: 0.66 sq mi (1.71 km^{2})

Population (2024)
  - Total: 88,090
  - Density: 133,000/sq mi (51,500/km^{2})
- Time zone: UTC+07:00 (Indochina Time)
- Administrative code: 27142

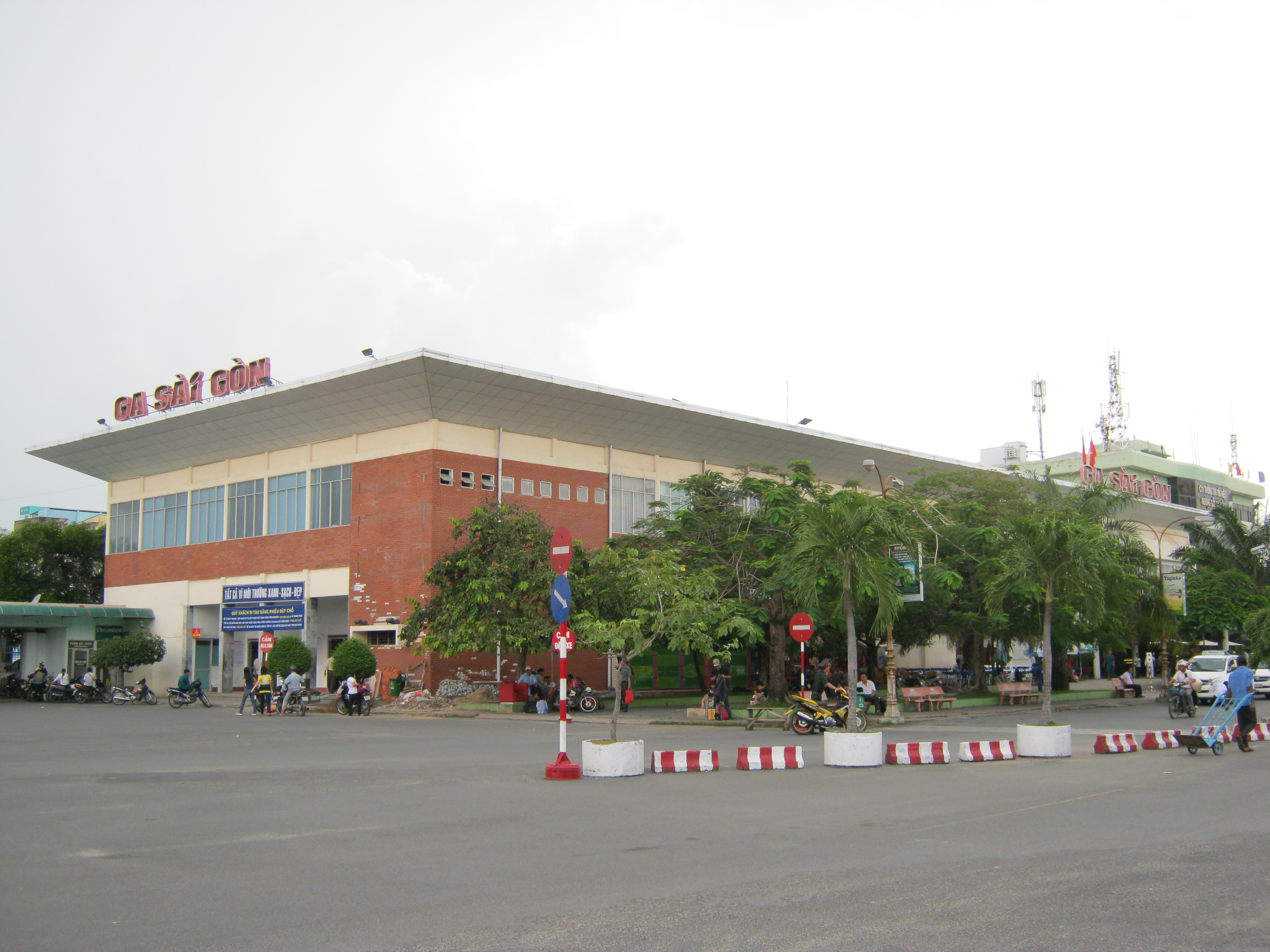
Saigon Station

Nhiêu Lộc (Vietnamese: Phường Nhiêu Lộc) is a ward of Ho Chi Minh City, Vietnam. It is one of the 168 new wards, communes and special zones of the city following the reorganization in 2025.

Nhiêu Lộc ward is the site of the Saigon station, the southern terminus of Vietnam's North–South railway.

== Geography ==
The ward is located in the city center, it adjacent to:

- Phú Nhuận ward to the North (by the former Canal de Ceinture);
- Tân Sơn Nhất ward to the West;
- Hòa Hưng ward by Cách Mạng Tháng Tám Street;
- Xuân Hòa ward to the East by route of Lý Chính Thắng – Trần Quốc Thảo and Nhiêu Lộc – Thị Nghè Channel.

According to Official Dispatch No. 2896/BNV-CQĐP dated May 27, 2025 of the Ministry of Home Affairs, following the merger, Nhiêu Lộc has a land area of 1.71 km², the population as of December 31, 2024 is 88,090 people, the population density is 51,514 people/km².

== History ==
On June 16, 2025, the National Assembly Standing Committee issued Resolution No. 1685/NQ-UBTVQH15 on the arrangement of commune-level administrative units of Ho Chi Minh City in 2025 (effective from June 16, 2025). Accordingly, the entire land area and population of Ward 9, Ward 11, Ward 12 and Ward 14 of the former District 3 will be integrated into a new ward named Nhiêu Lộc (Clause 7, Article 1).

== Healthcare ==
=== Hospitals ===
- Ho Chi Minh City Ear Nose and Throat Hospital
- Ho Chi Minh City Transport Hospital
- Prima Saigon Medical Center, treating approximately 120,000 patients and performing 15,000 major surgical procedures annually, with net revenue of US$18 million.
