= Nhat Tran =

Vietnamese Urushi artist

- Born: Tran Cong Hoang Nhat; 1962 (age 63–64); Saigon, Veitnam
- Education: University of Fine Arts (BA)
- Website: https://www.urushi-artist.com/home

Nhat Tran is a Vietnamese Urushi artist who currently resides in Indianapolis, Indiana.

== Early life and education ==
Tran was born in Saigon, Vietnam in 1962 under the name Tran Cong Hoang Nhat. She received her bachelor's degree in 1992 from the University of Fine Arts, in Ho Chi Minh City.

== Career ==
Tran began working with the Japanese lacquer urushi in 1998 after grants from the Indianapolis Arts Council allowed her to study the urushi art form with master artists in Japan.

In 2008, the Indianapolis Airport displayed Tran's "On the Tip of Our Wings" collection. This piece consisted of 29 individually shaped airplane wing tips each with 10 coats of urushi primer and 15 layers of hand-applied pigmented urushi. The collection of lacqured wings was displayed on the south side of the Ticketing Hall in the Indianapolis Airport.

In 2012, after a tsunami in Japan destroyed many trees that produce the sap to make the lacquer, Tran began working in digital photography. Her 2012 show in Gallery 924 displayed a mixture of Tran's urushi work and digital photography. The show was titled "Orchestral Collage: New Work by Nhat Tran" and was open until February 24, 2012.

In 2018, the JCC Indianapolis held a show of Tran's work that prominently featured her piece "Between Yin and Yang," urushi lacquer on whitetail deer antler.

Tran participated in the Hubei Museum of Art's 2019 Hubei International Triennial of Lacquer Art, titled World of Lacquer: Vessel & Form. Her piece "Dancing in the Moonlight" was selected by the show's curators for display.

"Resplendence," Tran's November 2019 show, featured twelve works presented in a private home. The show's namesake is a 20-inch by 48 inch Urushi lacquer on wooden board piece made by Tran.

From May 1 until June 26, 2026, Tran's exhibition, "Urushi Odyssey", was held by the Harrison Center. This show of Tran's work included a collection of urushi artworks lacquered on to both 2D and 3D forms including antlers, wood, bones, polystyrene, plexiglass, and ceramics.
