= Cầu Kiệu =

Cầu Kiệu Phường Cầu Kiệu Trung Nhứt, Đông Nhứt, Đông Ba, Xóm Kiệu, Rạch Miễu
- Ward
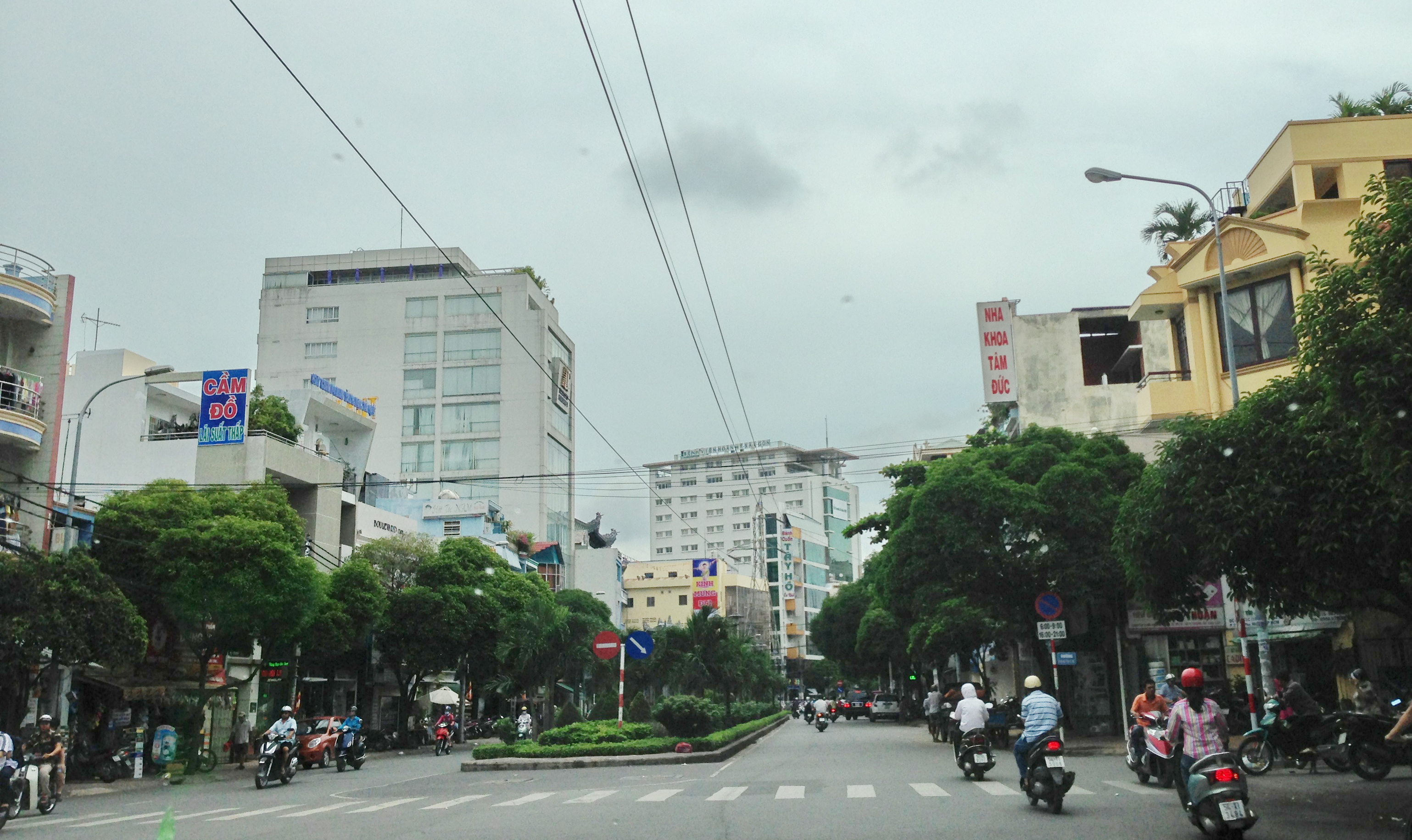
- Phan Xích Long Street at Rạch Miễu residential area
- Interactive map of Cầu Kiệu
- Coordinates: 10°47′53″N 106°41′08″E
- Country: Vietnam
- Municipality: Ho Chi Minh City
- Established: June 16, 2025
- Named after: Kiệu Bridge

Area
  - Total: 0.47 sq mi (1.23 km^{2})

Population (2024)
  - Total: 62,663
  - Density: 132,000/sq mi (50,900/km^{2})
- Time zone: UTC+07:00 (Indochina Time)
- Administrative code: 27058

Cầu Kiệu (Vietnamese: Phường Cầu Kiệu) is a ward of Ho Chi Minh City, Vietnam. It is one of the 168 new wards, communes and special zones of the city following the reorganization in 2025.

== Geography ==
Cầu Kiệu ward is located in the north of the central core of Ho Chi Minh City, bordering:

- Gia Định ward to the east;
- Đức Nhuận ward to the north, separated by Hoàng Văn Thụ Street;
- Phú Nhuận ward to the west, separated by streets of Phan Đình Phùng, Nguyễn Văn Trỗi and Trần Huy Liệu;
- Tân Định ward to the south by Nhiêu Lộc - Thị Nghè Channel.

According to Official Dispatch No. 2896/BNV-CQĐP dated May 27, 2025 of the Ministry of Home Affairs, following the merger, Phú Nhuận ward has a land area of 1.46 km², the population as of December 31, 2024 is 62,663 people, the population density is 132,000 people/km². Kiệu Bridge

== History ==
On June 16, 2025, the National Assembly Standing Committee issued Resolution No. 1685/NQ-UBTVQH15 on the arrangement of commune-level administrative units of Ho Chi Minh City in 2025 (effective from June 16, 2025). Accordingly, the entire land area and population of Ward 1, Ward 2, Ward 7 and part of Ward 15 of the former Phú Nhuận district will be integrated into a new ward named Cầu Kiệu (Clause 54, Article 1).
