= Đỗ Thị Ninh =

Đỗ Thị Ninh (born 1947) is a Vietnamese woman painter, though she refuses to be labelled a "woman artist". She graduated from Hanoi's Vietnam College of Fine Arts in 1966. She is one of the generation of artists which emerged, aged then 45–55 in the early 1980s which included Đặng Thị Khuê (born 1946), Đỗ Sơn (born 1943, military artist), Lương Xuân Đoàn (born 1952), Nguyễn Xuân Tiệp (born 1956), Nguyễn Bảo Toàn (born 1950) in Hanoi, Nguyễn Trung (born 1940), Đỗ Quang Em (1942–2021), Ca Lê Thắng (born 1949), Đào Minh Tri (born 1949), Nguyễn Thân (born 1948) in Ho Chi Minh City, Bửu Chi (born 1948) and Hoàng Đăng Nhuận (born 1942) in Huế.

== Works ==
- bãi biển Sầm Sơn (Sam Son Beach) silk 1987
- chùa Thầy (Thầy Temple) silk 1988
