= Nguyễn Lam (painter) =

Vietnamese artist

- Born: 1941; Can Tho
- Died: 28 June 2025 (aged 83–84); Ho Chi Minh City
- Notable work: Cuoi Cung (The End)

Nguyễn Lam (born 1941 in Can Tho, born Lam Hùynh Long) is a Vietnamese painter. He is one of the first members of the Saigon Young Painters Association established in the 1970s. He specialises in lacquer painting, and was invited by the French consulate in Ho Chi Minh City to restore the works of Nguyen Gia Tri in 2013.

Nguyen Lam’s works are in the permanent collections of the Vietnam Fine Arts Museum, the National Gallery Singapore, Ho Chi Minh City Museum of Fine Art, as well as in private collections throughout Asia, Europe and America.

== Biography ==
Nguyen Lam graduated from Ho Chi Minh City Fine Arts College, class of 1960 – 1965, the same cohort as other renowned paintings like Ho Huu Thu, Nguyne Phuoc and Do Trong Nhon.

Nguyen Lam participated in the Paris Biennale, Exhibition of Fine Arts in 1961 and 1963.

Between 1963 and 1972, Nguyen Lam had 7 solo exhibitions in Saigon and Malaysia.

From 1973 – 1975, he was a professor at the National Decorative Arts School of Gia Dinh and several other art institutions.

Nguyen Lam’s has 9 children, 5 girls and 4 boys. 8 of his children are artists, 6 of whom are members of the Ho Chi Minh City Fine Arts Association and the Vietnam Fine Arts Association. Huyen Lam, Lam Huynh Son, Huynh Lan, Lam Huynh Linh, Huyen Le, Lam Lan are painters while Lam Huynh Lam and Lam Huyen Ly are lacquer artists. His daughter Lam Huyen Loan is a zither artist. Lam’s grandson, Lam Ngoc Thanh is also a young painter.

When asked about his unique family of artists, Lam said “I am happy because all of them make a living by painting while obeying and respecting each other's work. Not all children follow the profession of painting from the beginning, some children don't learn to paint until middle age but then they find their own way."

== Artistic style ==
Nguyen Lam’s style is derived from three stages in his artistic career; the first stage is when he experimented with various artistic methods with an emphasis on learning, the second stage is when he started to paint semi-abstract and abstract pieces and the third stage is when he decided to focus entirely on abstract.

In addition to his dominant abstract style; both in oil and lacquer, he also paints figurative paintings.
