= Đỗ Quang Em =

Vietnamese painter (1942–2021)

Đỗ Quang Em (Ninh Thuận, Annam, Indochina, France (under the occupation of Japan), 1942 – 3 August 2021) was a Vietnamese painter based in Saigon, South Vietnam, then Ho Chi Minh City, Vietnam. He graduated from Gia Định College of Fine Arts (Cao Đẳng Mỹ Thuật Gia Định) in 1965. Along with contemporaries such as Đỗ Thị Ninh (1947-) he was one of the generation of painters who emerged in the early 1980s which rebelled against the traditions of the French EBAI and afterward socialist schools of Vietnamese art. He was for a period sent to a re-education camp. Since 1994 Em mainly exhibited in Hong Kong and overseas, and has had his paintings purchased by Bill Clinton.
