= Nhiêu Lộc–Thị Nghè Canal =

Canal in Ho Chi Minh City, Vietnam

Coordinates: 10°47′14″N 106°42′48″E

Nhiêu Lộc–Thị Nghè Canal Kênh Nhiêu Lộc – Thị Nghè
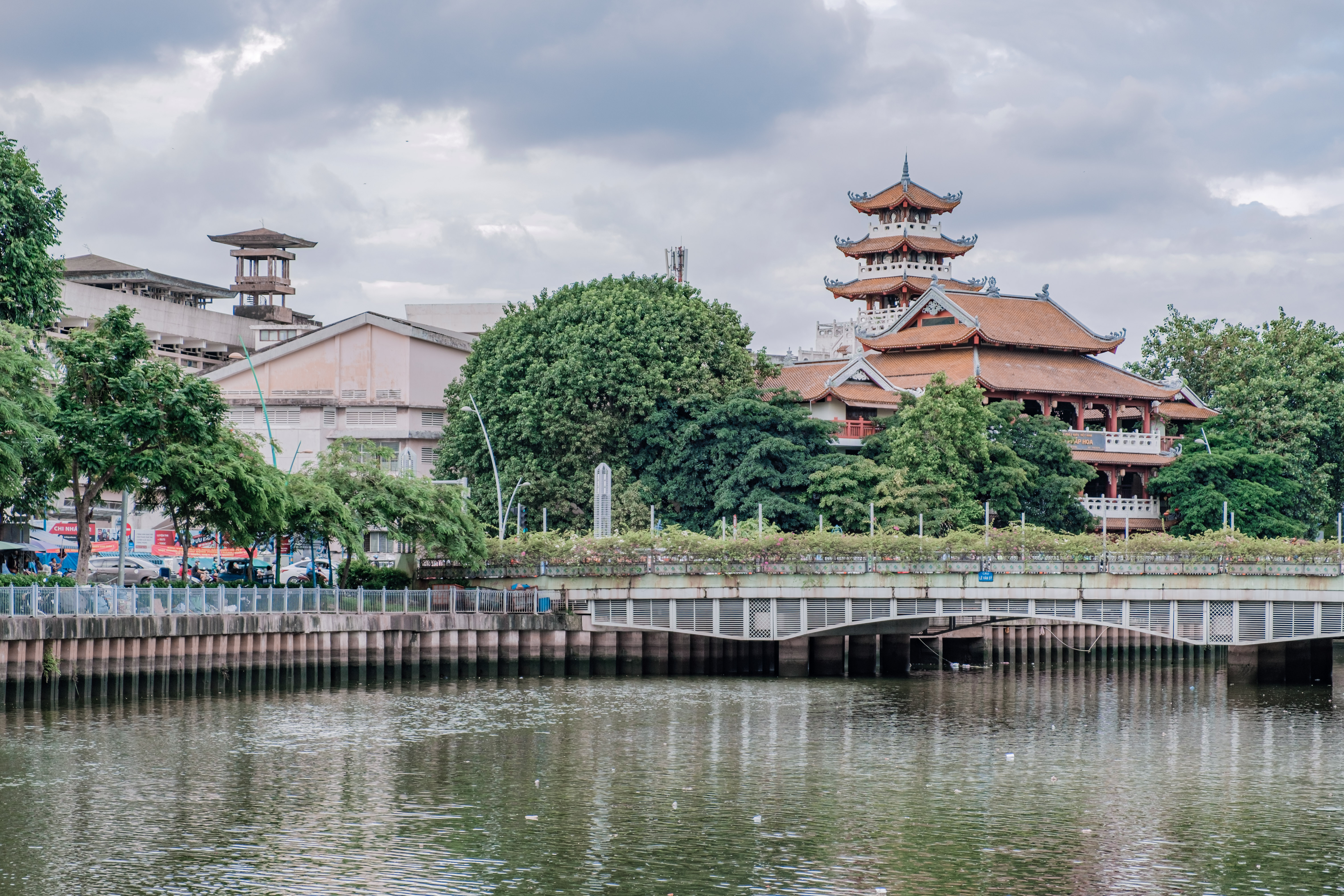
- Nhiêu Lộc canal flows through Pháp Hoa Pagoda and Lê Văn Sỹ Bridge in Nhiêu Lộc ward
- Interactive map of Nhiêu Lộc–Thị Nghè Canal; Kênh Nhiêu Lộc – Thị Nghè
- Location: Ho Chi Minh City, Vietnam

Specifications
- Length: 8.7 kilometers (5.4 mi)

History
- Former names: Nhiêu Lộc Canal; Thị Nghè Channel; (Before restoration)
- Date restored: 2002–present

The Nhiêu Lộc–Thị Nghè Canal (Vietnamese: Kênh Nhiêu Lộc – Thị Nghè) is a waterway in Ho Chi Minh City, Vietnam. The 9 km (6-mile) long canal passes through the wards of Tân Sơn Nhất, Tân Sơn Hòa, Phú Nhuận, Nhiêu Lộc, Xuân Hòa, Cầu Kiệu, Tân Định, Gia Định, Thạnh Mỹ Tây and Saigon and flows into the confluence of Văn Thánh Canal and Saigon River at where used to be the Saigon Naval Shipyard.

== Restoration ==
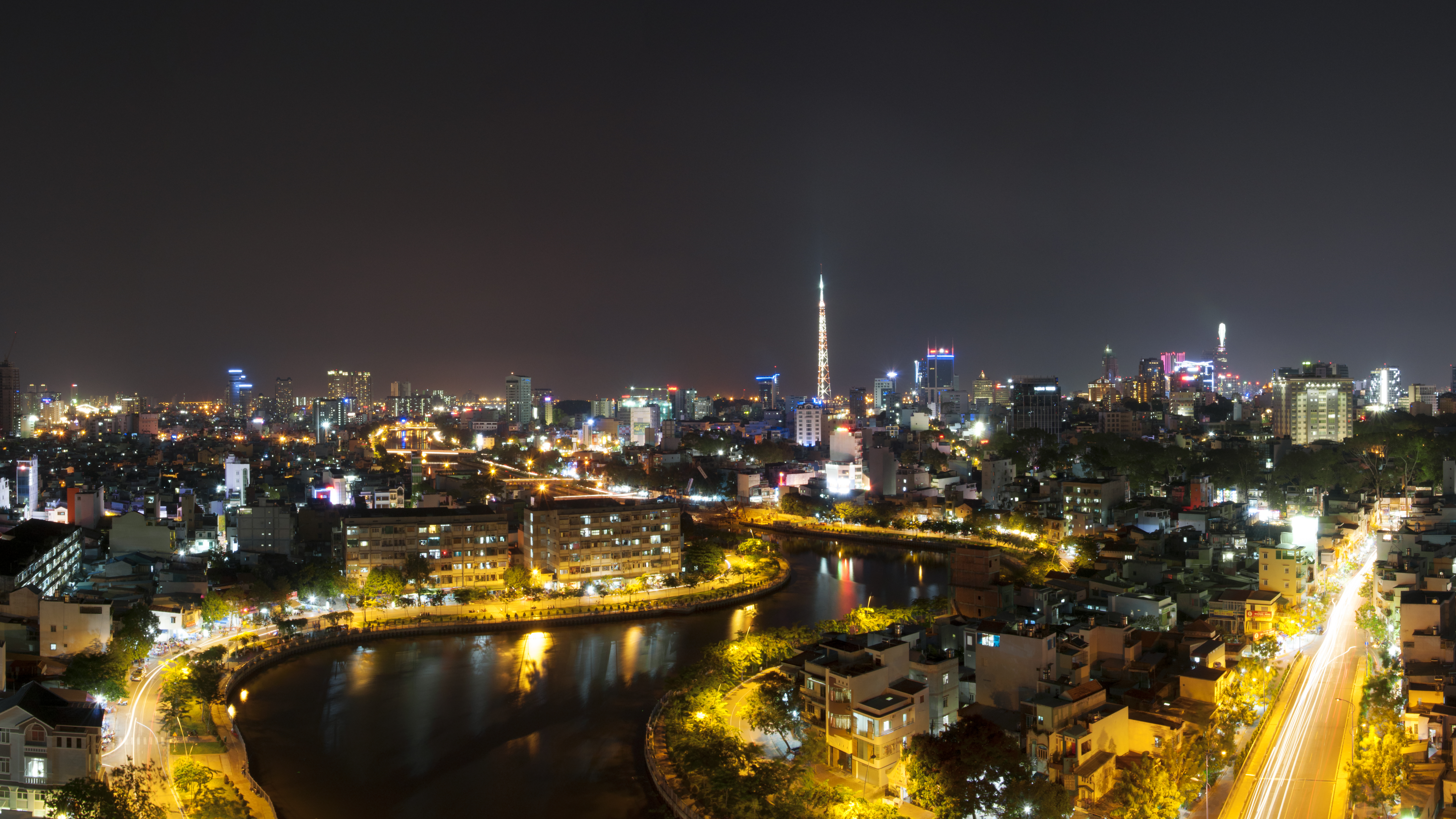
Thị Nghè Channel near Bông Bridge at night in 2014

The canal became heavily polluted following intense urban development in Ho Chi Minh City after 1975. Buildings dumped domestic trash and wastewater into the canal, leading to a dark appearance and noxious odor. A World Bank-funded project to restore the canal commenced in 2002, with the installation of sewers, dredging, and relocation of slums that bordered the canal. Truong Sa and Hoang Sa streets, which line the canal, were landscaped with trees and walking paths.

=== Road traffic ===
Currently, two roads running along the Nhieu Loc – Thi Nghe canal are named after the Vietnamese name of two archipelagos in the South China Sea that Vietnam claims sovereignty over: Trường Sa (Spratly Islands) road on the left bank is 8.3 km long and Hoàng Sa (Paracel Islands) road on the right bank is 7.4 km long (Hoàng Sa road is ended at Thị Nghè bridge near the Saigon Zoo and Botanical Gardens, while Trường Sa road is longer and ended at the Saigon River). Both roads were restored and expanded from February 2, 2012 and inaugurated after 6 months, at the same time the canal restoration is completed. After that, in the period of 2013–2015, the city government rebuilt three bridges across the canal are Lê Văn Sỹ Bridge, Kiệu Bridge and Bông Bridge, two underpassed at Điện Biên Phủ Bridge are also newly built to seamlessly connect two roads of Hoàng Sa and Trường Sa.

=== Water traffic ===
On September 1, 2015, the city government cooperated with Saigon Boat Company (Công ty Thuyền Sài Gòn) to launch a boat tour to take tourists on the canal. This route includes two piers named: Thị Nghè and Nhiêu Lộc, it starts at Hoang Sa Street near Thị Nghè Bridge in District 1 and end at the pier near Lê Văn Sỹ Bridge in District 3.
