= Phú Nhuận (ward) =

Phú Nhuận Phường Phú Nhuận Trung Nhì, Tây Nhì, Tây Ba
- Ward
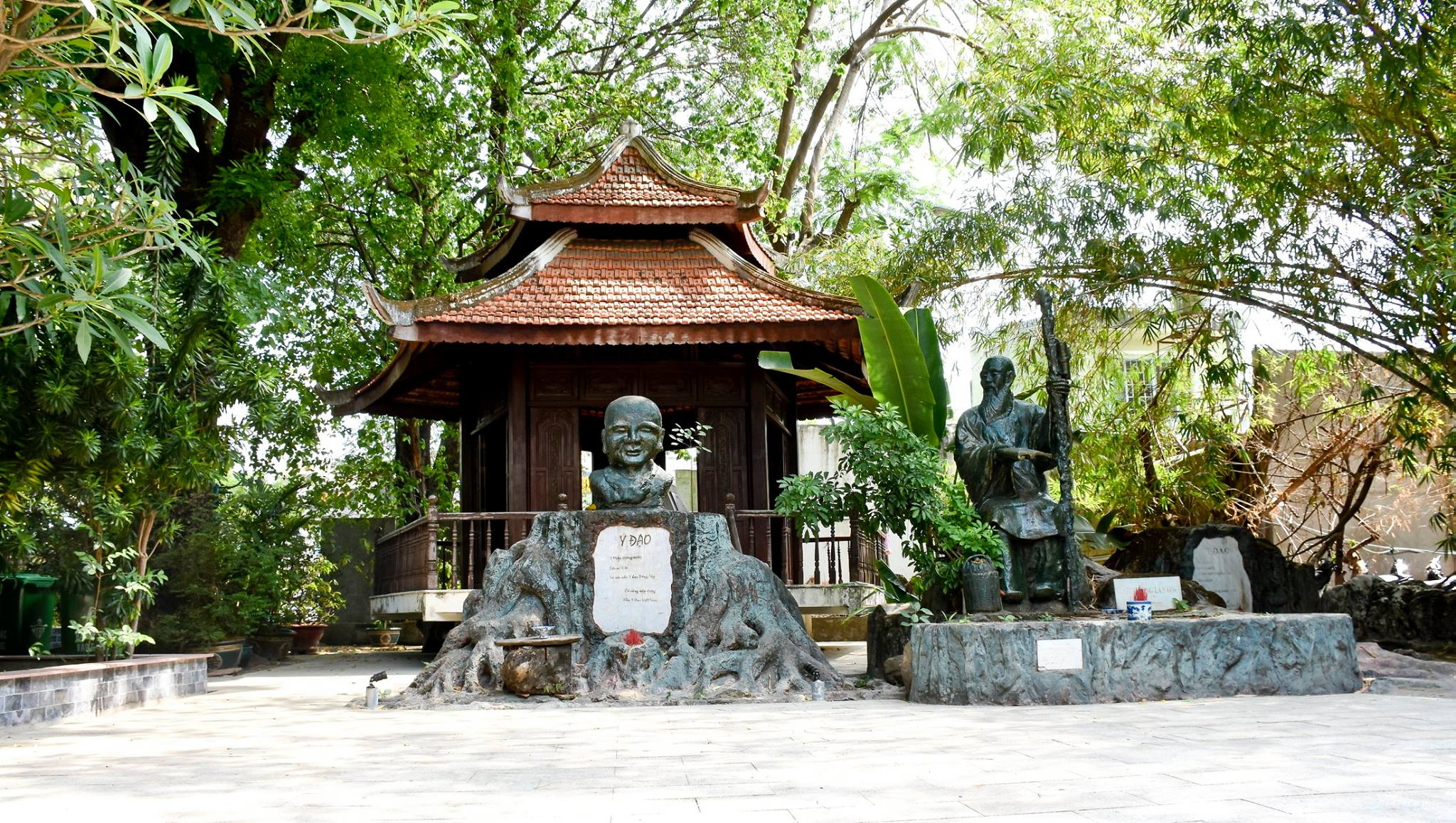
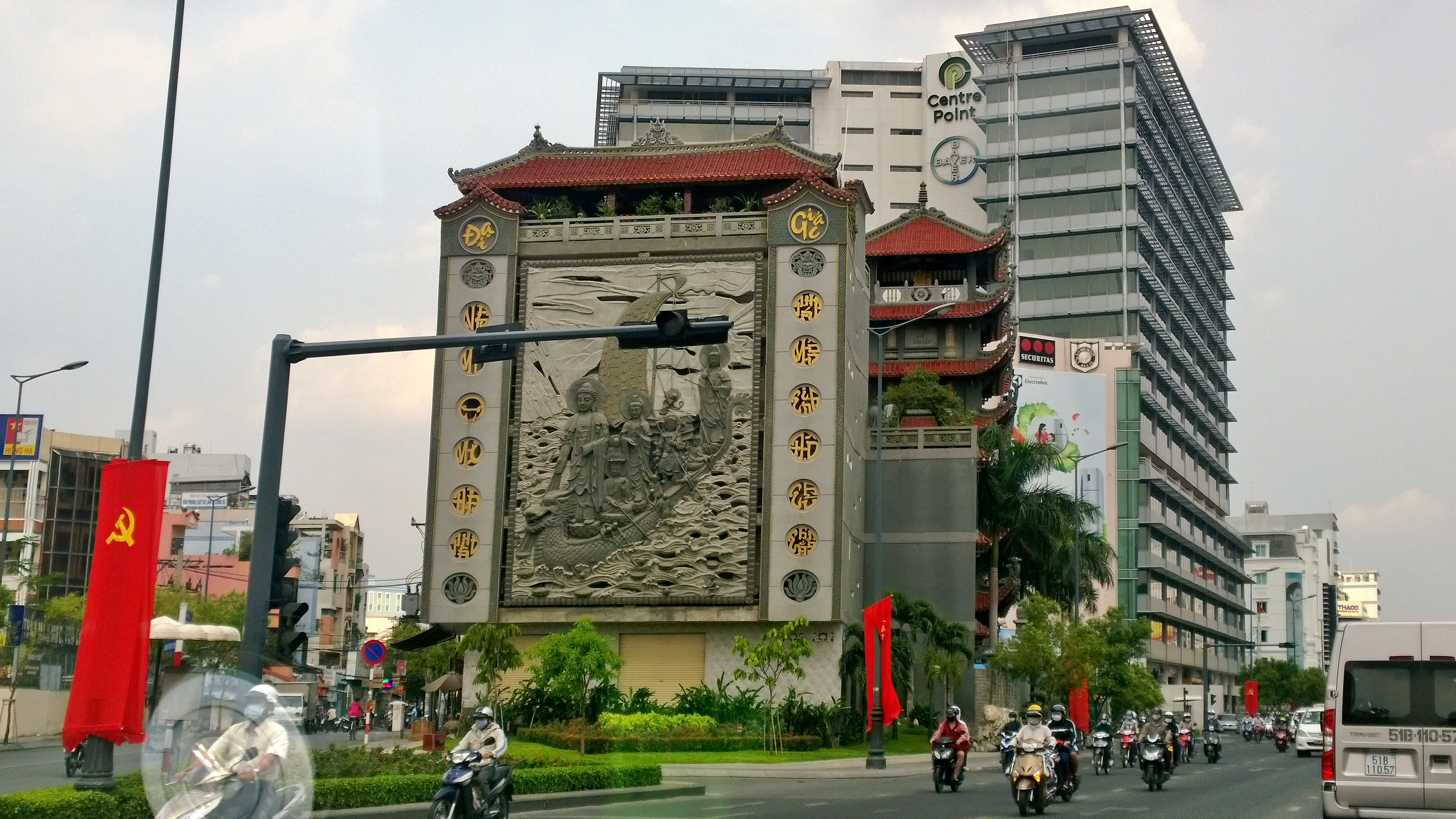
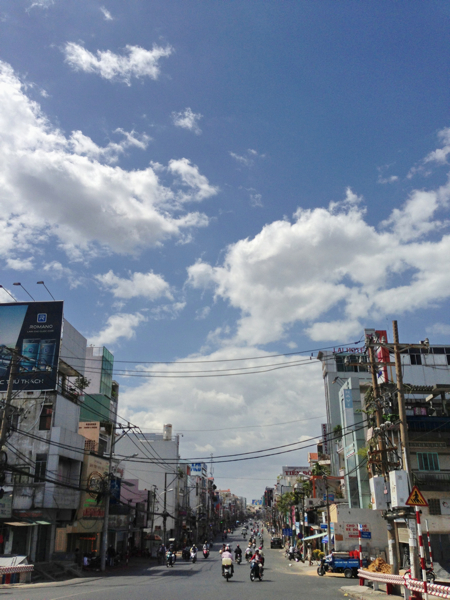
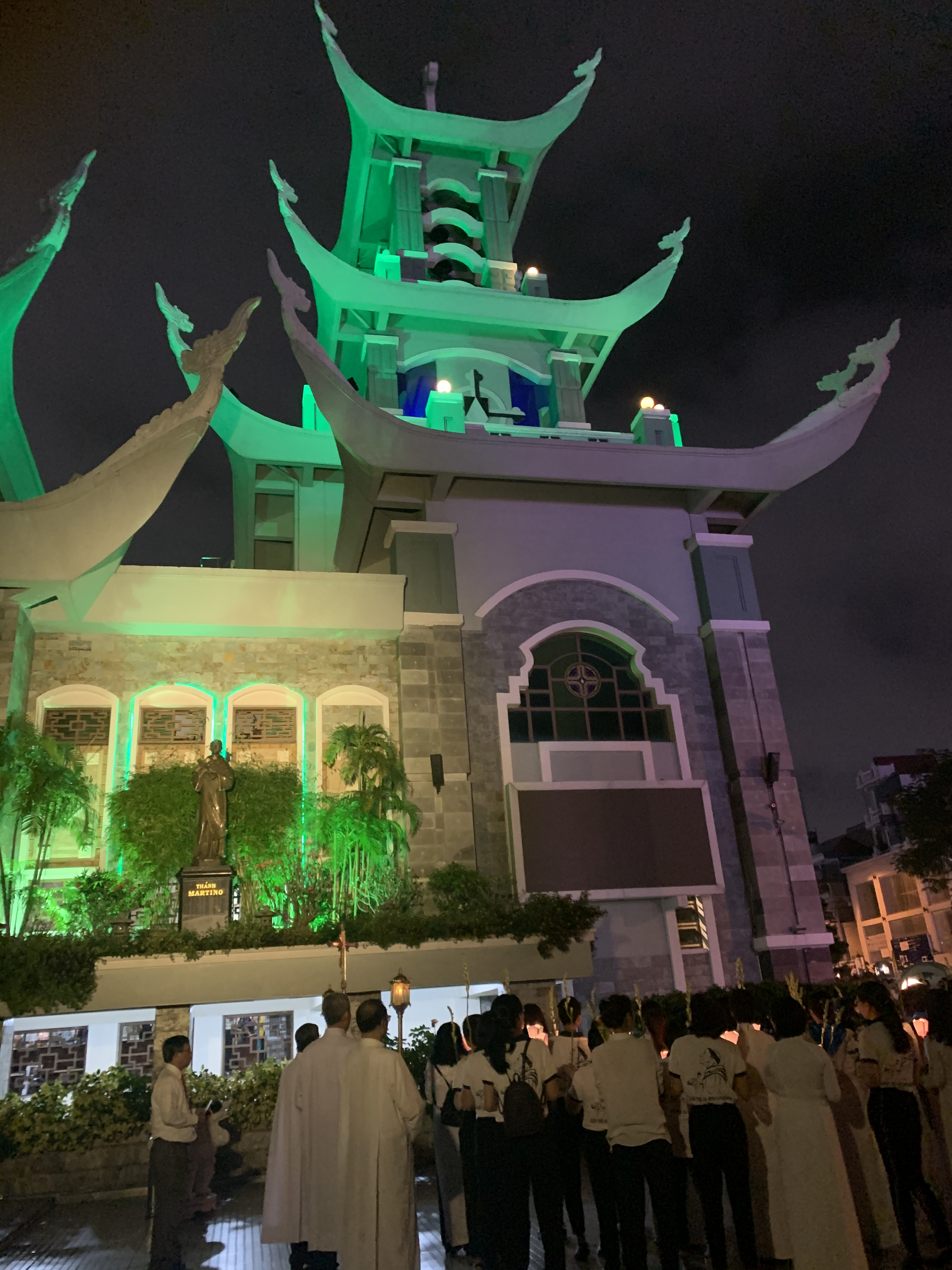
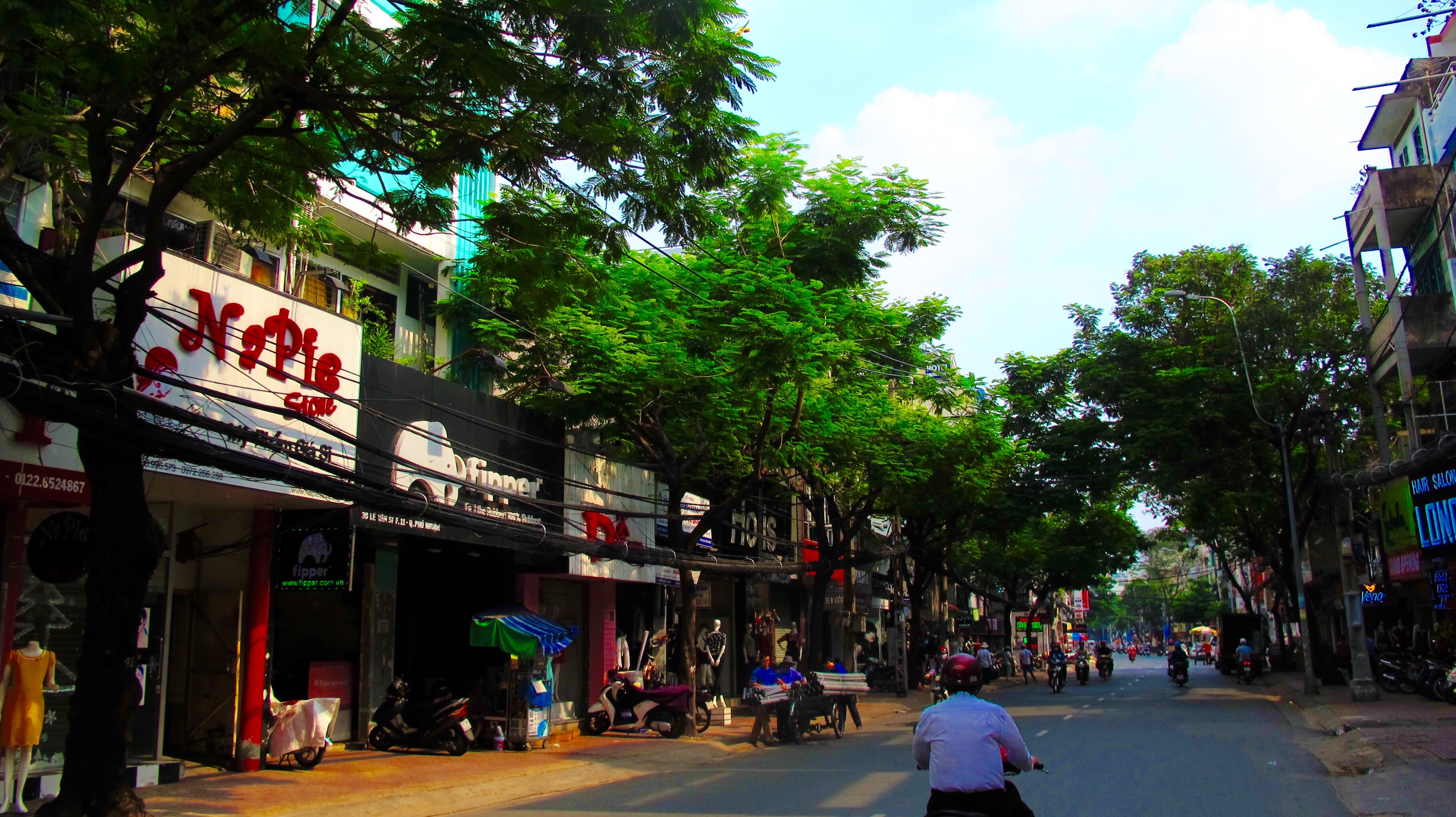
- From left to right: Statue of Hải Thượng Lãn Ông in the Ho Chi Minh City Traditional Medicine Institute, Đại Giác Temple with Mapletree CentrePoint Building behind at the intersection of Nguyễn Văn Trỗi and Nguyễn Trọng Tuyển, Phan Đình Phùng Street viewed from Kiệu Bridge, St. Dominic – Three Bells Parish Church, Lê Văn Sỹ Street
- Interactive map of Phú Nhuận
- Coordinates: 10°47′36″N 106°40′24″E
- Country: Vietnam
- Municipality: Ho Chi Minh City
- Established: June 16, 2025
- Quarters: 31 quarters (khu phố; from 1 to 31)

Area
  - Total: 0.56 sq mi (1.46 km^{2})

Population (2024)
  - Total: 68,420
  - Density: 121,000/sq mi (46,900/km^{2})
- Time zone: UTC+07:00 (Indochina Time)
- Administrative code: 27073

Phú Nhuận (Vietnamese: Phường Phú Nhuận) is a ward of Ho Chi Minh City, Vietnam. It is one of the 168 new wards, communes and special zones of the city following the reorganization in 2025.

== Geography ==
Phú Nhuận ward is located in the north of the central core of Ho Chi Minh City, 3km to the northwest of Saigon ward, bordering:

- Cầu Kiệu ward to the east, separated by streets of Phan Đình Phùng, Nguyễn Văn Trỗi and Trần Huy Liệu;
- Đức Nhuận ward to the north, separated by Hoàng Văn Thụ Street;
- Tân Sơn Nhất and Tân Sơn Hòa wards to the west;
- Nhiêu Lộc and Xuân Hòa ward to the south by Nhieu Loc–Thi Nghe Channel.

According to Official Dispatch No. 2896/BNV-CQĐP dated May 27, 2025 of the Ministry of Home Affairs, following the merger, Phú Nhuận ward has a land area of 1.46 km², the population as of December 31, 2024 is 68,420 people, the population density is 46,900 people/km².

== Division ==
Phú Nhuận ward is divided into 31 numberical quarters (khu phố), from 1 to 31.

== History ==
On June 16, 2025, the National Assembly Standing Committee issued Resolution No. 1685/NQ-UBTVQH15 on the arrangement of commune-level administrative units of Ho Chi Minh City in 2025 (effective from June 16, 2025). Accordingly, the entire land area and population of Ward 8, Ward 10, Ward 11, Ward 13 and part of Ward 15 of the former Phú Nhuận district will be integrated into a new ward named Phú Nhuận (Clause 55, Article 1).

== Healthcare ==
- Ho Chi Minh City Traditional Medicine Institute: 273–275 Nguyễn Văn Trỗi Boulevard
- Phú Nhuận General Hospital:
  - Branch 1: 274 Nguyễn Trọng Tuyển Street
  - Branch 2: 128 Nguyễn Trọng Tuyển Street (under construction, originally place of Overseas Chinese Public School [華僑公學] then Vạn Tường Primary School)
- Saigon ITO Phú Nhuận Hospital: 170C Nguyễn Trọng Tuyển Street

== Notable places ==
=== Religious site ===
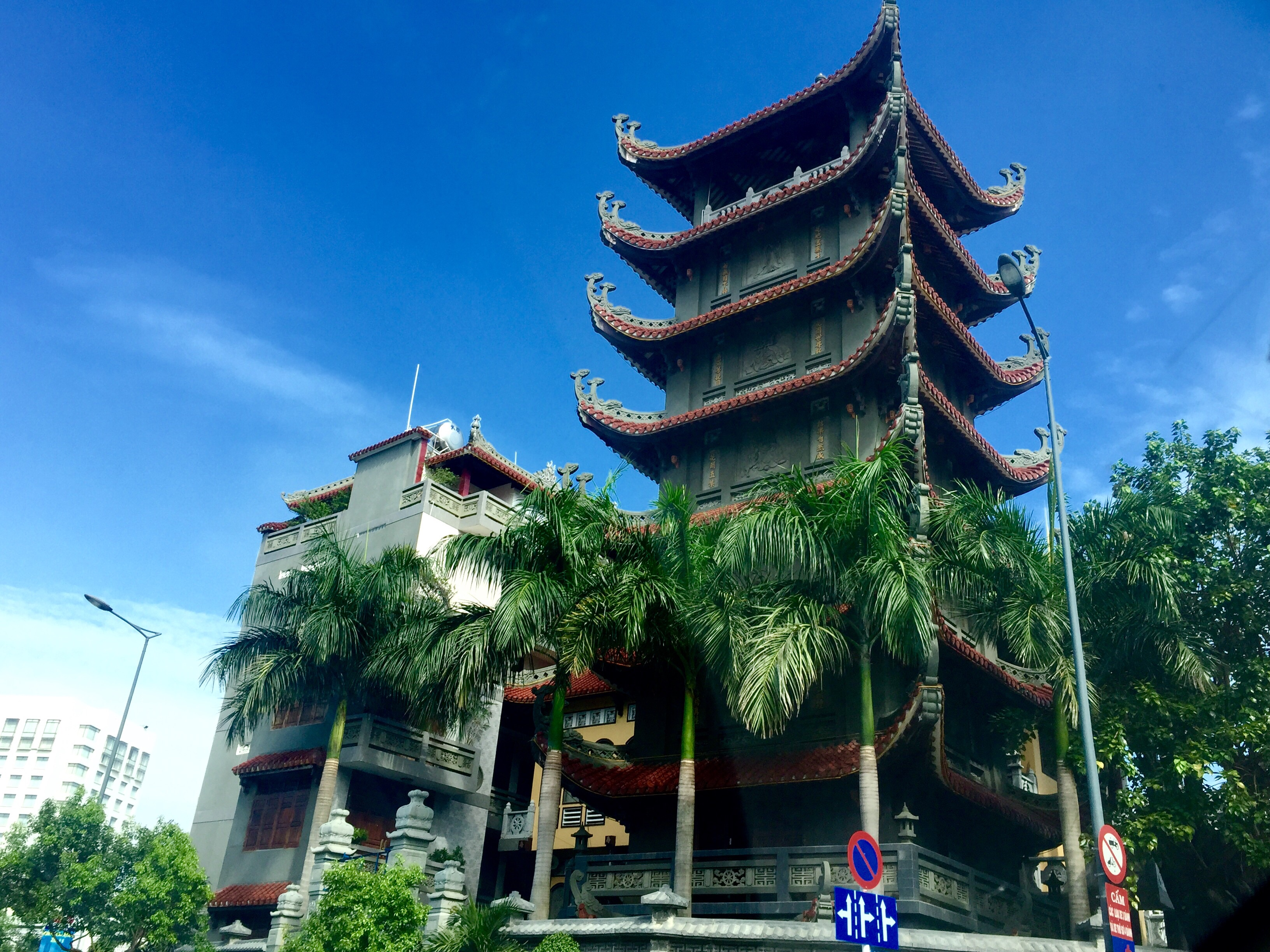
Đại Giác Temple

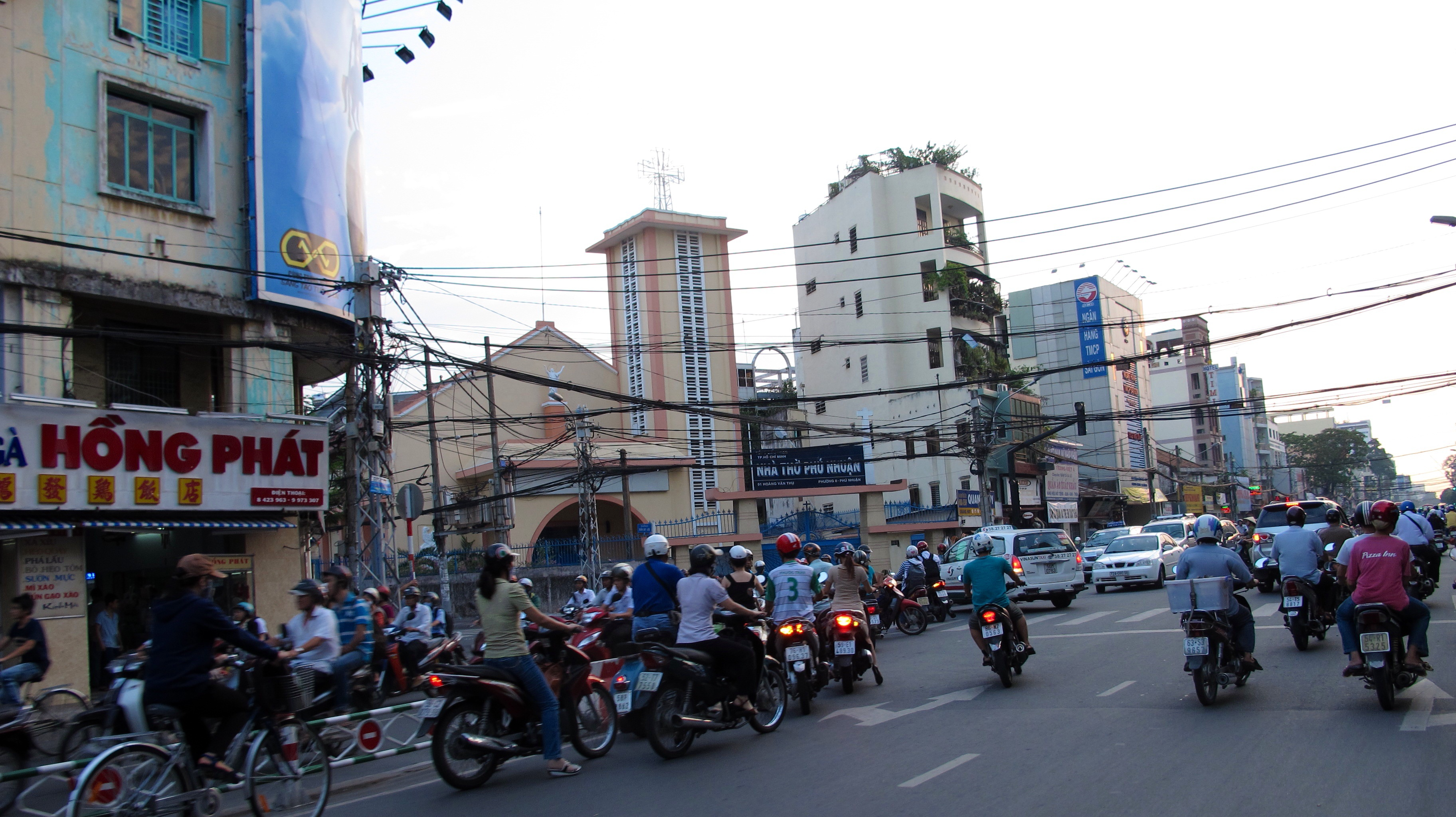
Phú Nhuận Church

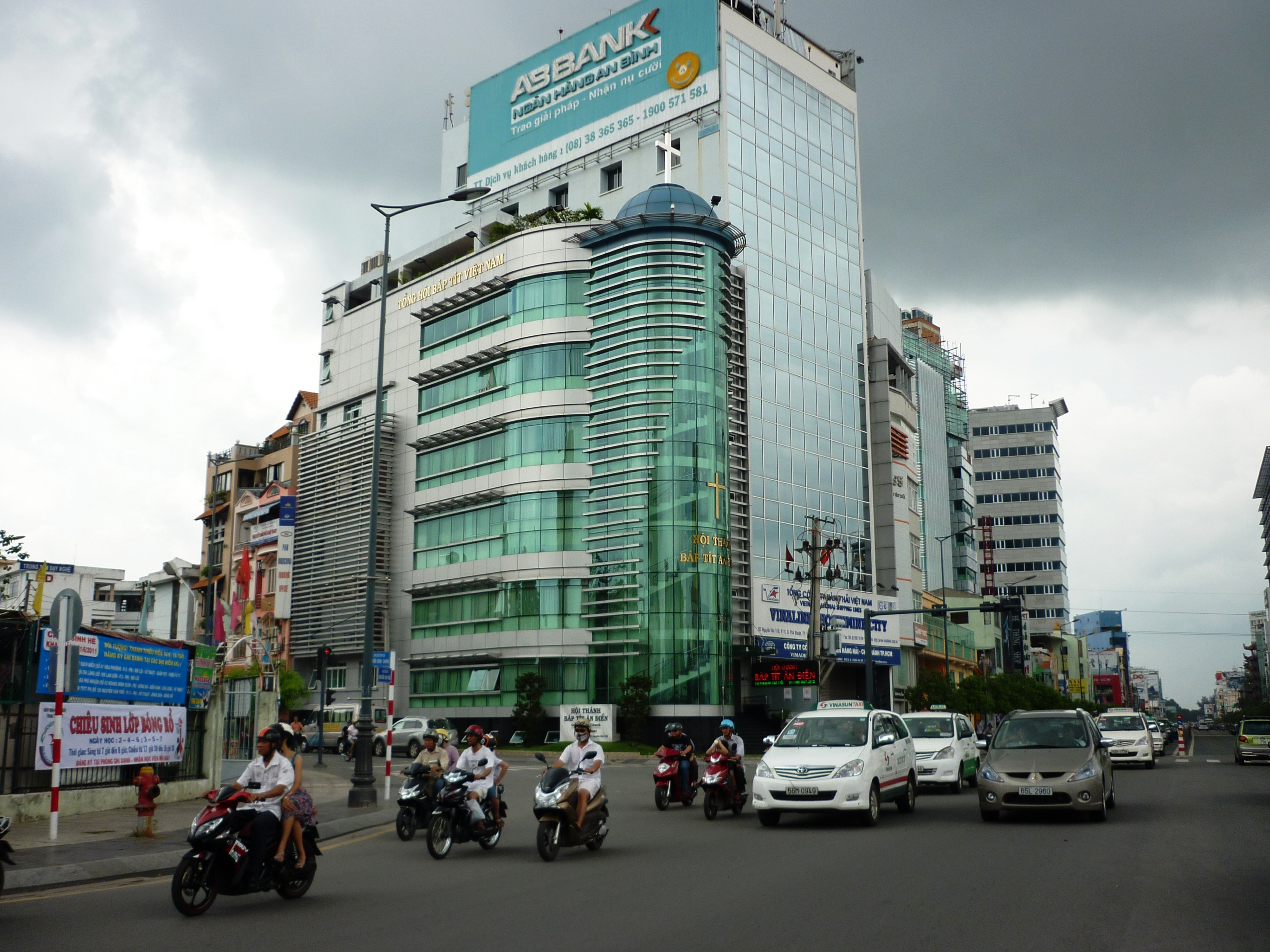
Grace Baptist Church

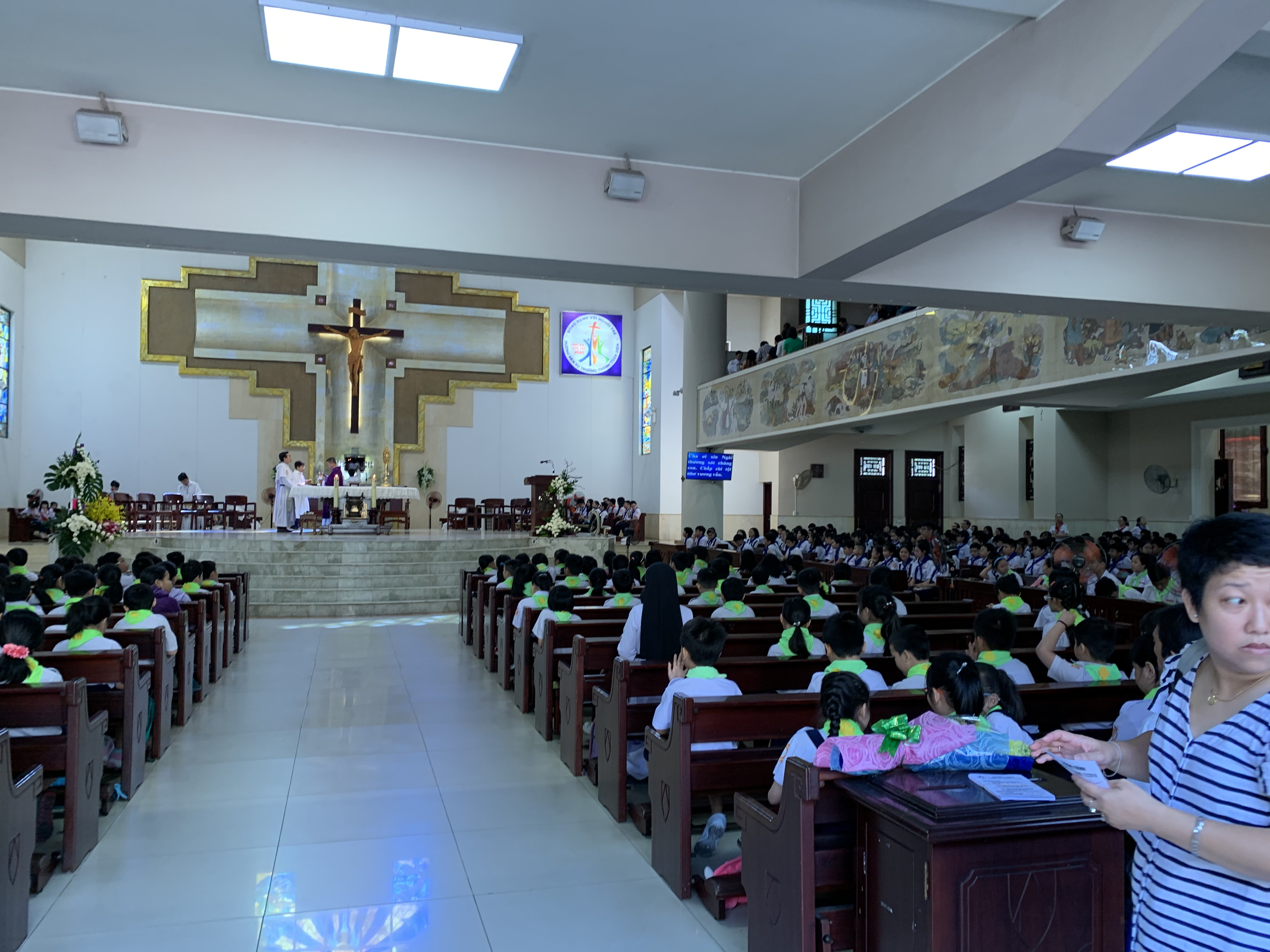
Inside the St. Dominic Three Bells Church
