= Ho Chi Minh City University of Fine Arts =

University in Vietnam

- Đại học Mỹ thuật Thành phố Hồ Chí Minh (Vietnamese)
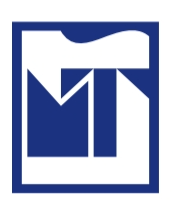
- Former name: École des Dessins; École des Arts appliqués de Gia Định; Gia Định College of Fine Arts
- Type: Public
- Established: 1976
- Location: No. 5, Phan Đăng Lưu Street, Ward 1, Bình Thạnh District, Ho Chi Minh City, Vietnam; 10.8029°N 106.6943°E
- Campus: Urban
- Website: hcmufa.edu.vn

Ho Chi Minh City University of Fine Arts (Vietnamese: Đại học Mỹ thuật Thành phố Hồ Chí Minh) is a university in Bình Thạnh District, Ho Chi Minh City, Vietnam. The predecessor of this school was the École des Dessins, founded by André Joyeux in 1913, which became the École des Arts appliqués de Gia Đinh (Trung học Trang trí Mỹ thuật Gia Định) from 1940 to 1971.

Under the administration of the Republic of Vietnam, from 1971, the school was upgraded to become Saigon College of Fine Arts. The Fine Arts College was founded in 1976. In 1981, the Vietnamese prime minister decided to found the university as it is today.

== Alumni ==
- Nguyẽ̂n Lam (born 1941)
- Đỗ Quang Em (1942–2021)
- Nhat Tran (born 1962)
- Lê Hiền Minh (born 1979)
