= Xuân Hòa, Ho Chi Minh City =

Xuân Hòa Phường Xuân Hòa Tân Định
- Ward
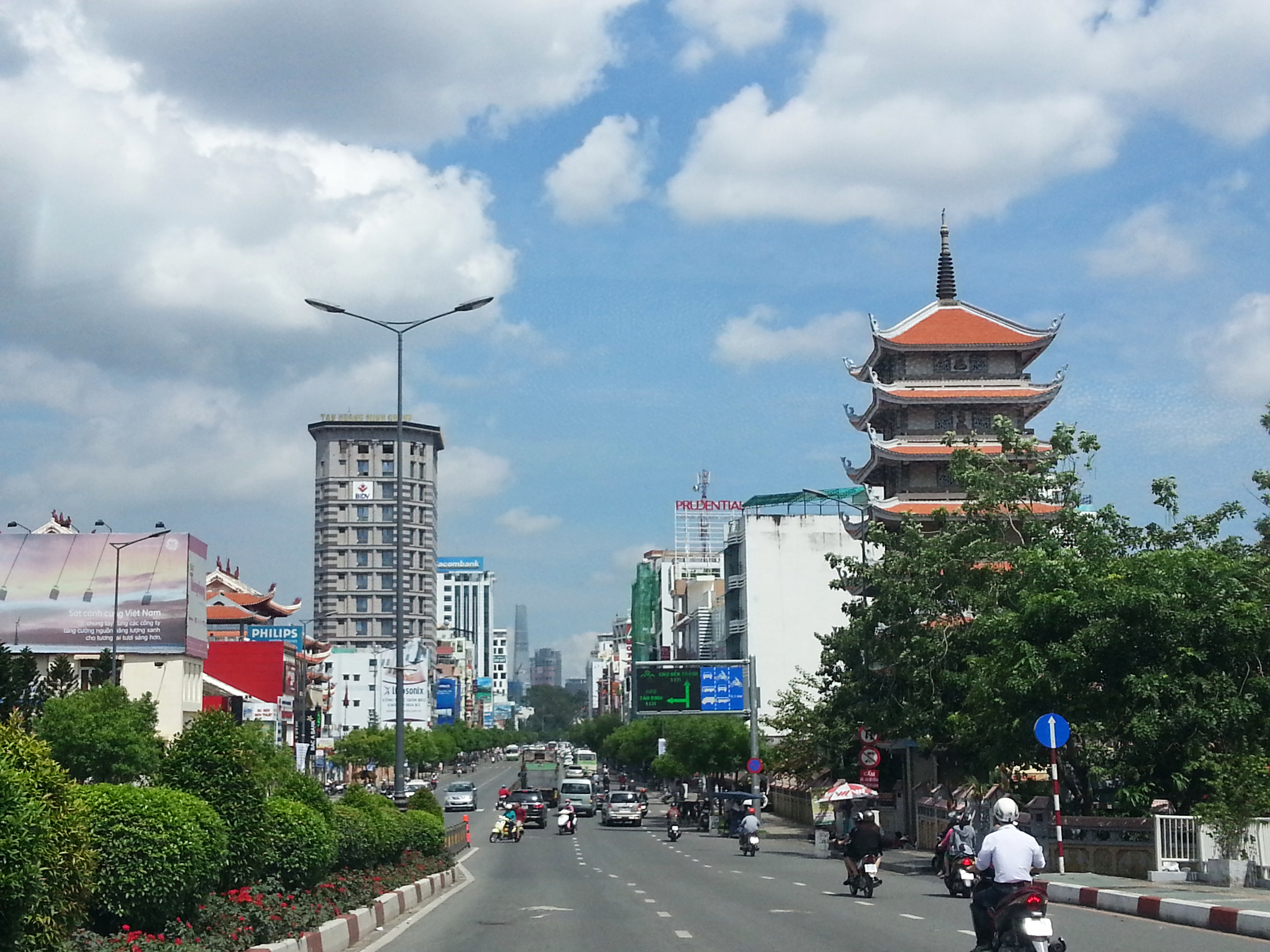
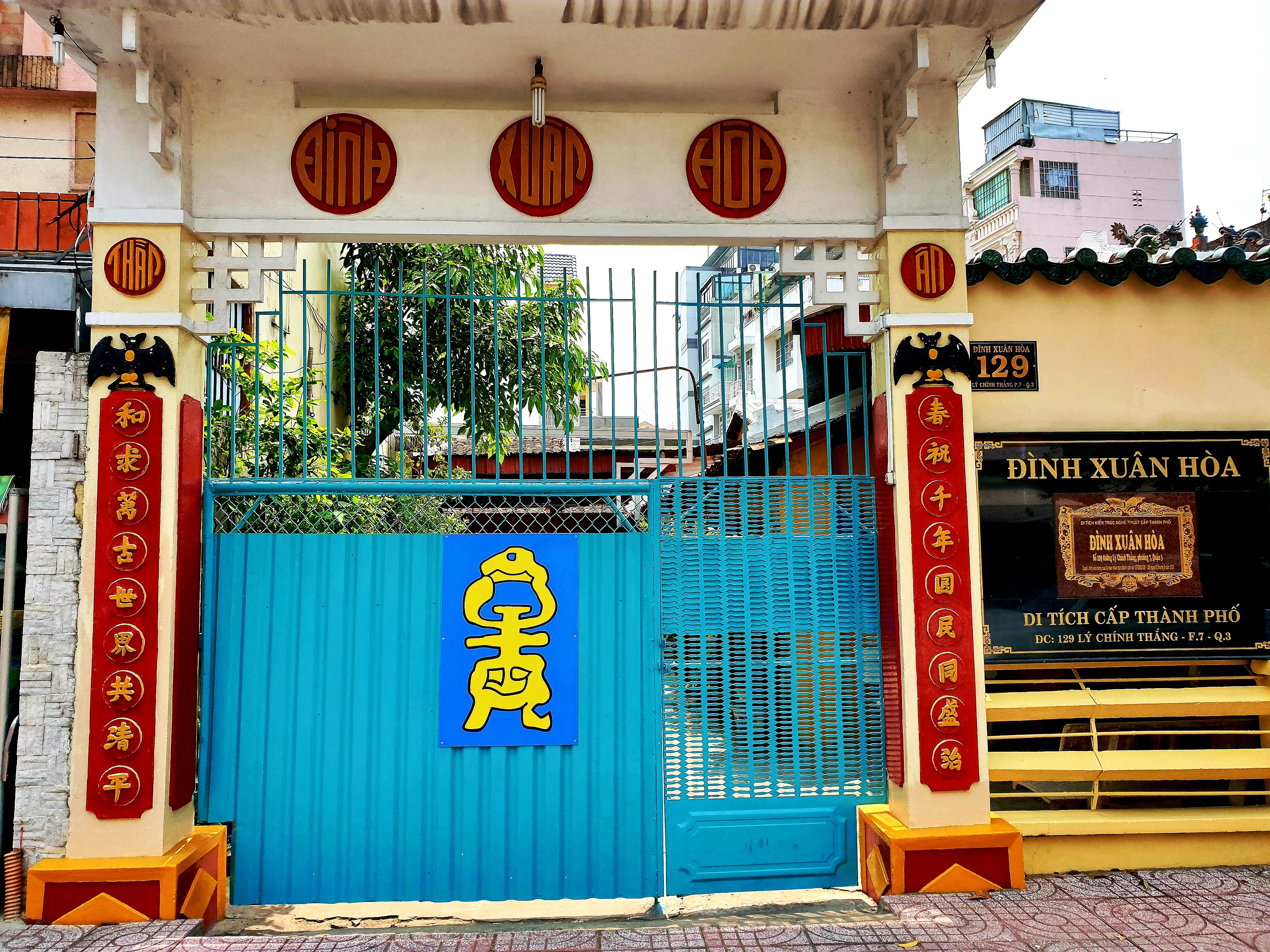
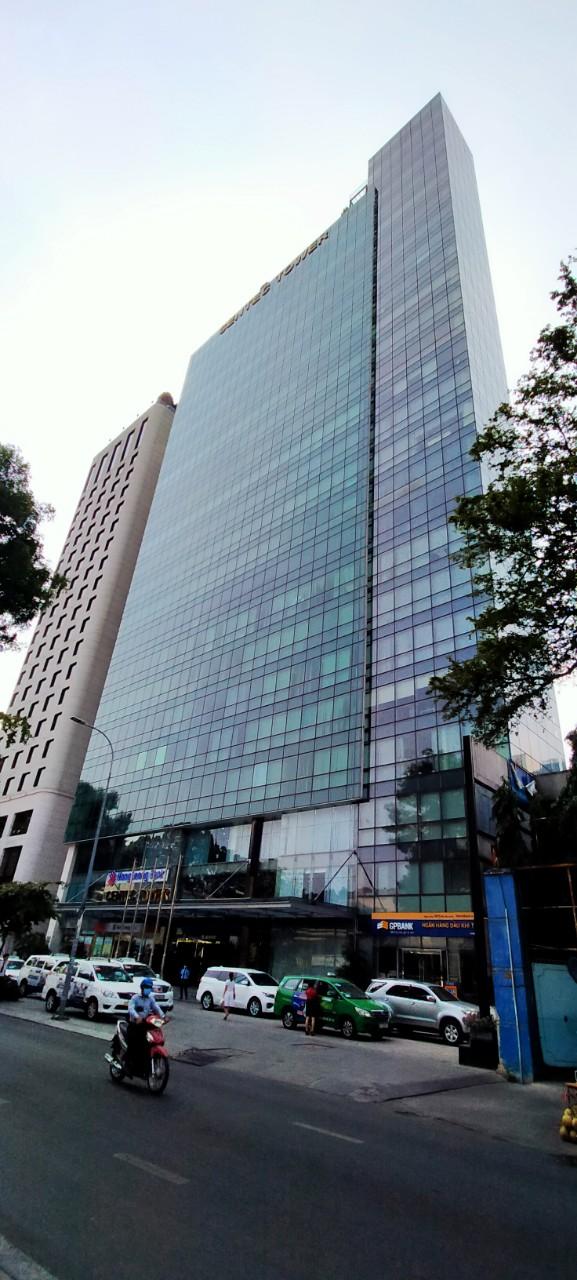
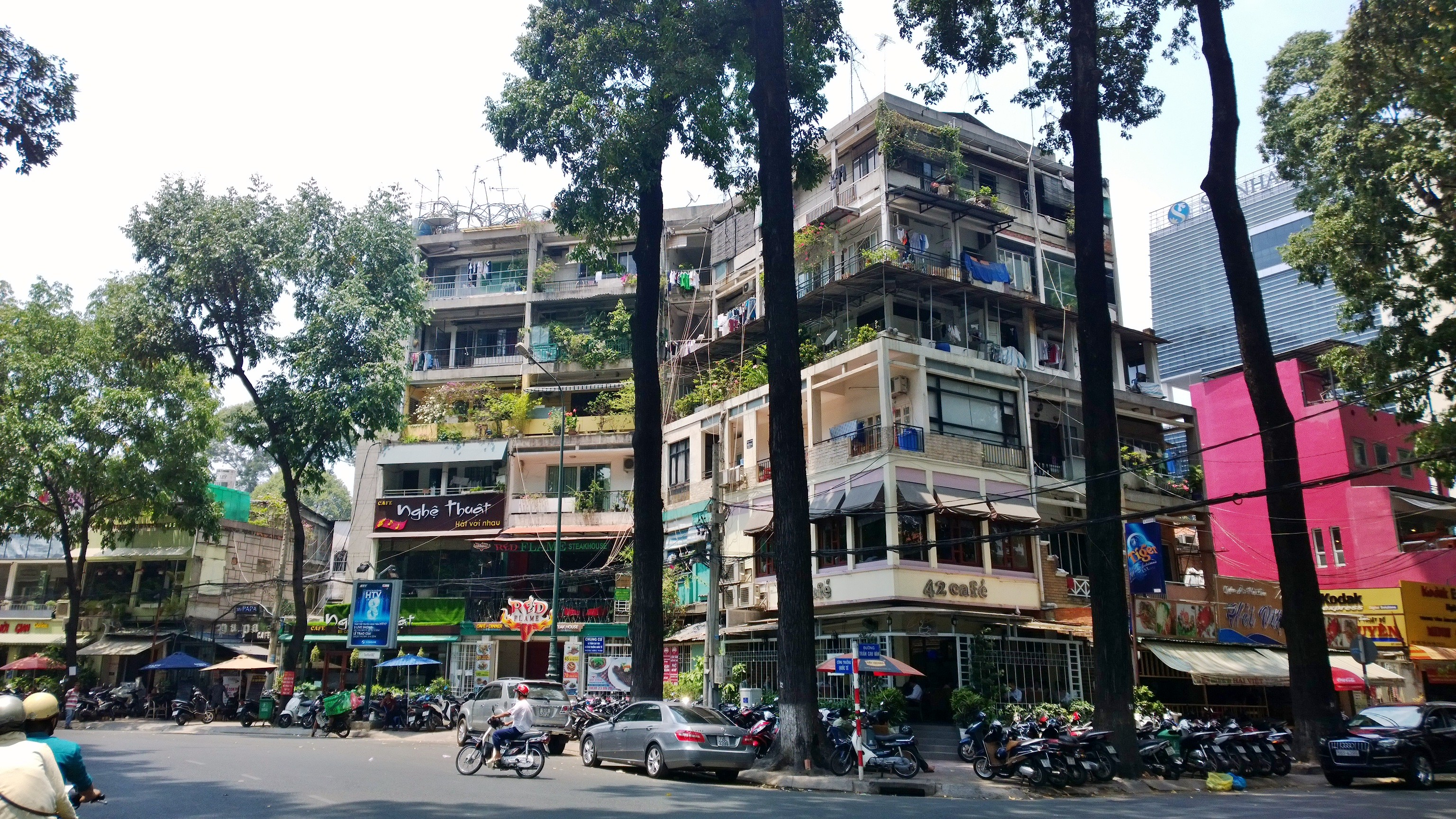
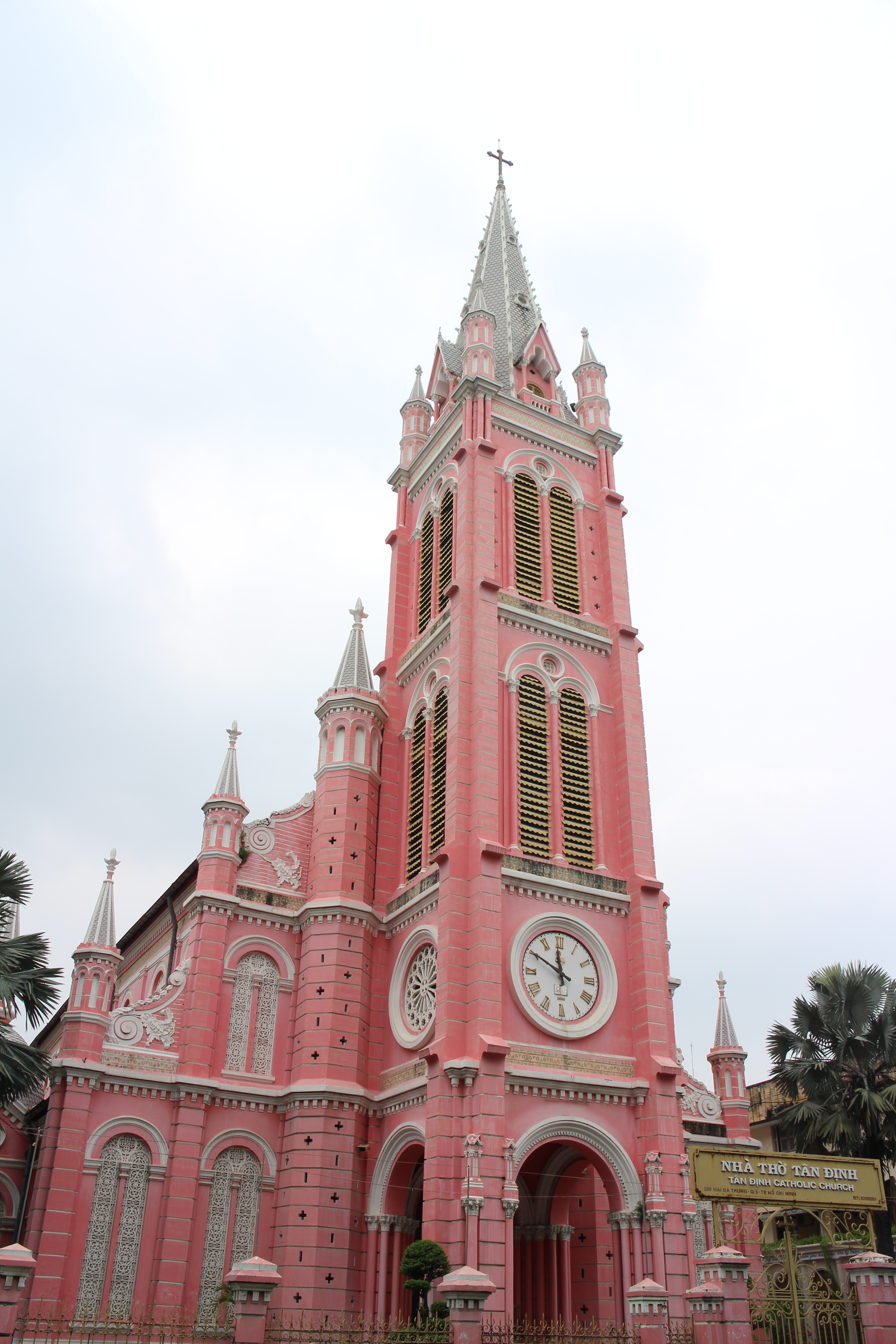
- From left to right: Nam Kỳ Khởi Nghĩa Street viewed from Công Lý Bridge, Xuân Hòa village temple on Lý Chính Thắng Street, Centec Tower with the Hôtel des Arts Saigon - MGallery Collection by Accor, Old apartment at the International Square, Tân Định Church
- Interactive map of Xuân Hòa
- Coordinates: 10°46′59″N 106°41′20″E
- Country: Vietnam
- Municipality: Ho Chi Minh City
- Established: June 16, 2025

Area
  - Total: 0.86 sq mi (2.22 km^{2})

Population (2024)
  - Total: 48,464
  - Density: 56,500/sq mi (21,800/km^{2})
- Time zone: UTC+07:00 (Indochina Time)
- Administrative code: 27139

Xuân Hòa (Vietnamese: Phường Xuân Hòa) is a ward of Ho Chi Minh City, Vietnam. It is one of the 168 new wards, communes and special zones of the city following the reorganization in 2025.

It was formed from the Võ Thị Sáu ward with a triangle city block of Ward 4 at the Democracy Roundabout (Công trường Dân Chủ) of the former District 3, Ho Chi Minh City.

== Geography ==
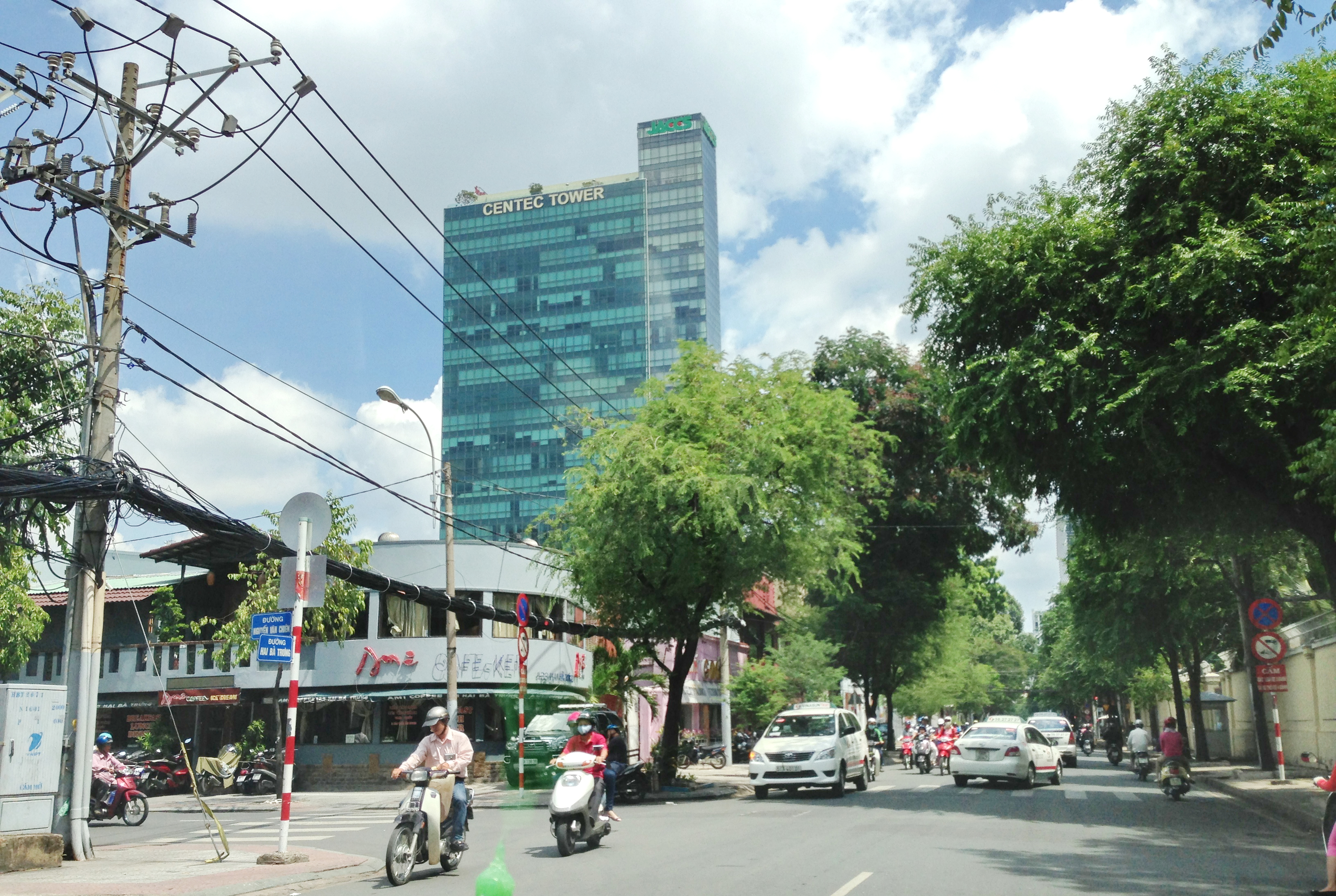
Hai Bà Trưng Street, the boundary of the Xuân Hòa ward with Saigon and Tân Định ward, with the Centec Tower in the background.

The ward is located in the city center, it adjacent to:

- Tân Định and Saigon by Hai Bà Trưng Street in the northeast.
- Bến Thành and Saigon ward by Nguyễn Thị Minh Khai Street in the southeast.
- Wards of Bàn Cờ by corner of Điện Biên Phủ – Cách Mạng Tháng Tám Street and Vườn Lài by Nguyễn Thượng Hiền Street in the southwest.
- Wards of Nhiêu Lộc by corner of Lý Chính Thắng – Trần Quốc Thảo Street and Phú Nhuận by Nhieu Loc–Thi Nghe Channel (with part of Nhiêu Lộc ward in the northern bank of the channel) in the west.

According to Official Dispatch No. 2896/BNV-CQĐP dated May 27, 2025 of the Ministry of Home Affairs, following the merger, Xuân Hòa has a land area of 2.22 km², the population as of December 31, 2024 is 48,464 people, the population density is 21,830 people/km².

== History ==
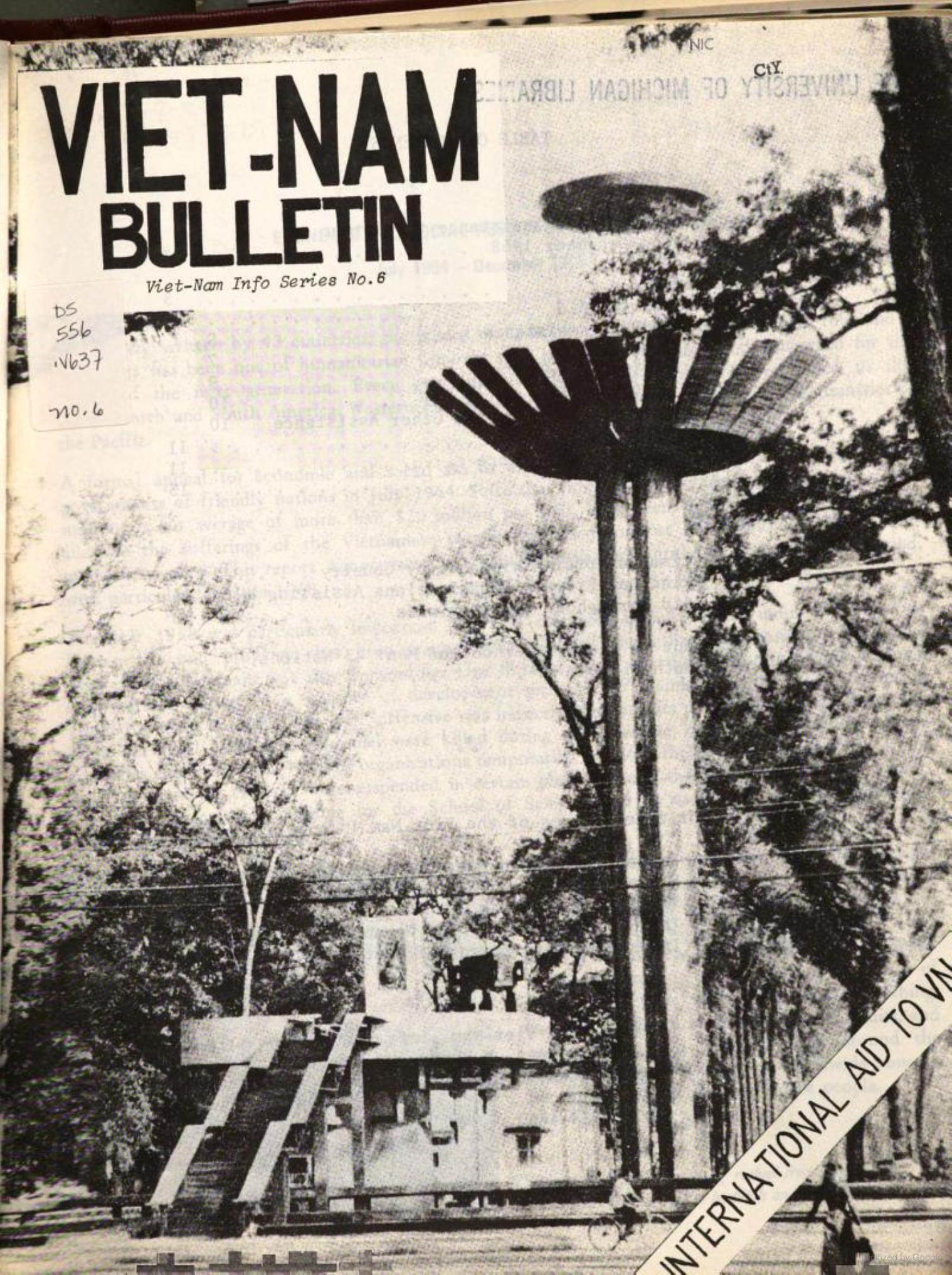
International Square in the Republic Of Vietnam

Before 1975, the current Xuân Hòa ward (not include the triangle urban block of the former Ward 4) was the wards of Đài Chiến Sĩ and part of Yên Đổ of District 3, City of Saigon and both are divided by Yên Đổ Street (now is Lý Chính Thắng Street). Most of the wards in Saigon in the reign of South Vietnam were named after a street or a notable sight and Đài Chiến Sĩ (means 'Monument of Soldier') was the official name of the square surrounds the Turtle Lake, and Yên Đổ ward was named after the same name street. Later, when the Monument of Soldier Square renamed into the International Square, the Đài Chiến Sĩ ward was also renamed as Hiền Vương ward after the same name street (now is known as Võ Thị Sáu Street)

In 1976, wards of Hiền Vương and Yên Đổ are dissolved and established 7 numerical wards from 11 to 17 and belong to District 3, Ho Chi Minh City.

August 26, 1982, the Council of Ministers of Vietnam established the Decision No. 147-HĐBT. Accordingly, Ward 16 was dissolved and merged into Ward 15 and 17.

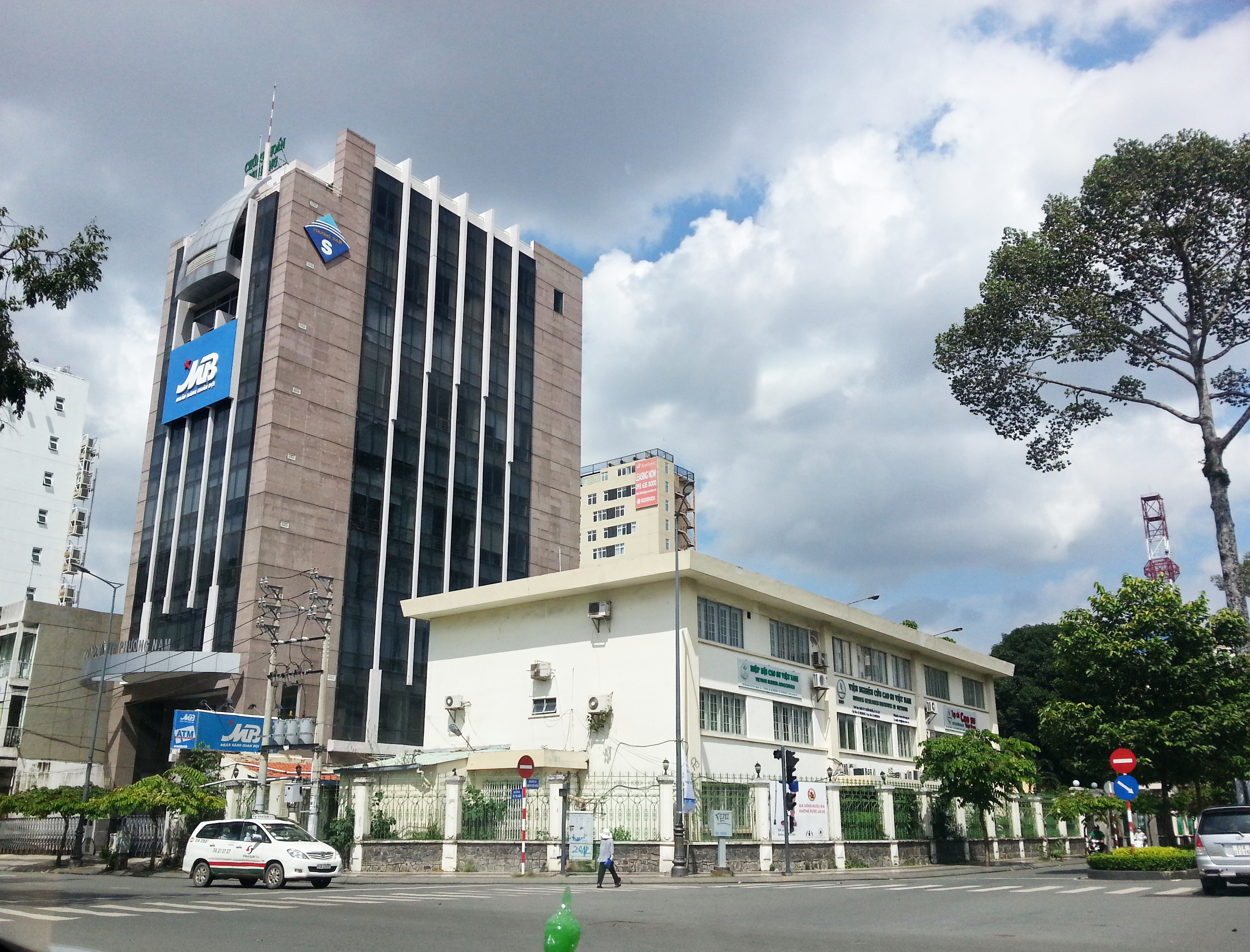
Intersection of Võ Thị Sáu and Nam Kỳ Khởi Nghĩa street, also where the former wards of 6, 7 and 8 of the former District 3 intersect

September 17, 1988, the Council of Ministers established the Decision No. 145-HĐBT. From that:

- Renamed Ward 11 as Ward 6
- Merged Ward 12 and 15 to establish Ward 7
- Merged Ward 13 and 14 to establish Ward 8.

Until 2019, Ward 6 has an area of 0,88 km^{2}, population is 7.263 people; Ward 7 has an area of 0,92 km^{2}, population is 12.595 people; Ward 8 has an area of 0,40 km^{2}, population is 16.877 people.

On December 9, 2020, the Standing Committee of the National Assembly of Vietnam established the Resolution No. 1111/NQ-UBTVQH14 about rearranging the District and Commune-level subdivisions and settling the City of Thủ Đức of Ho Chi Minh City (the resolution takes effect from January 1, 2021). Accordingly, the entire area and population of Ward 6, Ward 7, and Ward 8 will be merged to form Võ Thị Sáu Ward.

On June 16, 2025, the Standing Committee of the National Assembly issued Resolution 1685/NQ-UBTVQH15 on the rearrangement of commune-level administrative units in Ho Chi Minh City in 2025 (the resolution takes effect from July 1, 2025). Accordingly, the entire area and population of Võ Thị Sáu Ward and the city block of the former District 3 Police Department in Ward 4 will be rearranged to form a new ward called Xuân Hòa ward of Ho Chi Minh City.

== Etymology ==
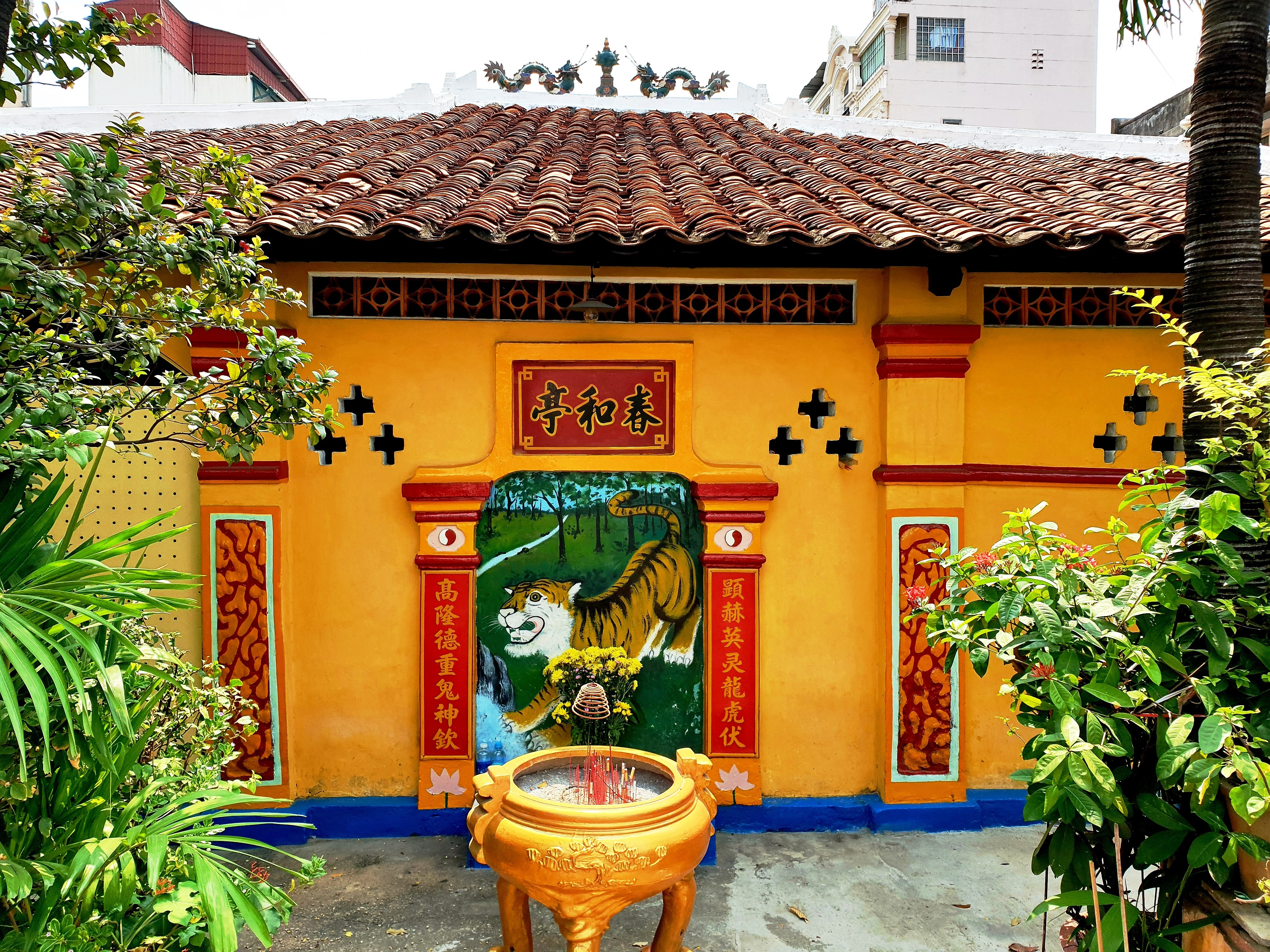
Tiger God Shrine in Xuân Hòa Village Temple, 129 Lý Chính Thắng

During the 2025 administrative unit rearrangement at the commune level, Ho Chi Minh City decided to name the new wards and communes with letters (no longer using numbers or names of historical figures) with much consideration from the history of the land, familiarity and cultural values. This policy was widely supported by the people.

According to the book "Cultural Heritage Journey of Ho Chi Minh City" (Hành trình di sản văn hóa Thành phố Hồ Chí Minh; Vietnam News Agency Publishing House), the name Xuân Hòa has existed since 1880. At that time, some villages and hamlets according to the land register compiled in 1836 by the Nguyễn dynasty were abolished. Some new village and hamlet names appeared. Tân Định village was then renamed Xuan Hoa hamlet. Tân Định village temple was also renamed Xuân Hoà village temple.

Xuân Hoà village temple still preserves many valuable and rare artifacts dating from 100 to 200 years. On August 5, 2003, Xuân Hòa village temple was ranked as "The Municipality-level Architectural and Artistic Relic" (Di tích Kiến trúc Nghệ thuật Cấp Thành phố) by Decision No. 137/2003/QD-UB signed by the chairman of the People's Committee of Ho Chi Minh City.

Thus, the name Xuân Hoà was given to the new ward based on the ancient name of this land and a village temple here.

== Education ==
=== Universities ===
Name	Address	Image	Note
University of Economics Ho Chi Minh City	59C Nguyễn Đình Chiểu		Campus A (Headquarters)
University of Economics Ho Chi Minh City	17 Phạm Ngọc Thạch		Campus I
University of Economics Ho Chi Minh City	232/6 Võ Thị Sáu		Campus V
University of Architecture Ho Chi Minh City	196 Pasteur		Headquarters (Main gate)
University of Architecture Ho Chi Minh City	59D Nguyễn Đình Chiểu		Orient Commercial Joint Stock Bank's ATM
Ho Chi Minh City Open University	97 Võ Văn Tần		Campus 1
Saigon University	105 Bà Huyện Thanh Quan		Campus 1 – Faculty: Business Administration, Finance and Accounting
Saigon University	20 Ngô Thời Nhiệm		Campus 3 – Practice Primary School
Ho Chi Minh City Cadre Academy	146 Võ Thị Sáu		Campus 3

=== High schools (including the escalator schools) ===
Name	Address	Image	Website
Nguyễn Thị Minh Khai High School	275 Điện Biên Phủ Road		thptnguyenthiminhkhai.hcm.edu.vn
Lê Quý Đôn High School	110 Nguyễn Thị Minh Khai Street		thpt-lequydon-hcm.edu.vn
Marie Curie High School	159 Nam Kỳ Khởi Nghĩa Street		thptmariecurie.hcm.edu.vn
Trường THPT Nguyễn Thị Diệu	12 Trần Quốc Toản Road		thptnguyenthidieu.hcm.edu.vn
Lê Thị Hồng Gấm High School	147 Pasteur Street		thptlethihonggam.hcm.edu.vn
Western Australia School System	43 Nguyễn Thông Road (Partial Integrated Primary School Campus)		wass.edu.vn
Western Australia School System	157 Lý Chính Thắng (International Campus)		wass.edu.vn

=== Secondary schools ===
Name	Address	Image	Website
Lê Lợi Secondary School	239 Lý Chính Thắng (Main gate)		thcsleloiq3.hcm.edu.vn
Hai Bà Trưng Secondary School	295 Hai Bà Trưng Street		thcshaibatrungq3.hcm.edu.vn
Colette Secondary School	10 Hồ Xuân Hương Street		thcscolette.hcm.edu.vn
Lê Quý Đôn Secondary School	9B Võ Văn Tần & No. 2 Lê Quý Đôn		thcslequydonq3.hcm.edu.vn

== Healthcare ==
List of some major hospitals in Xuân Hòa ward

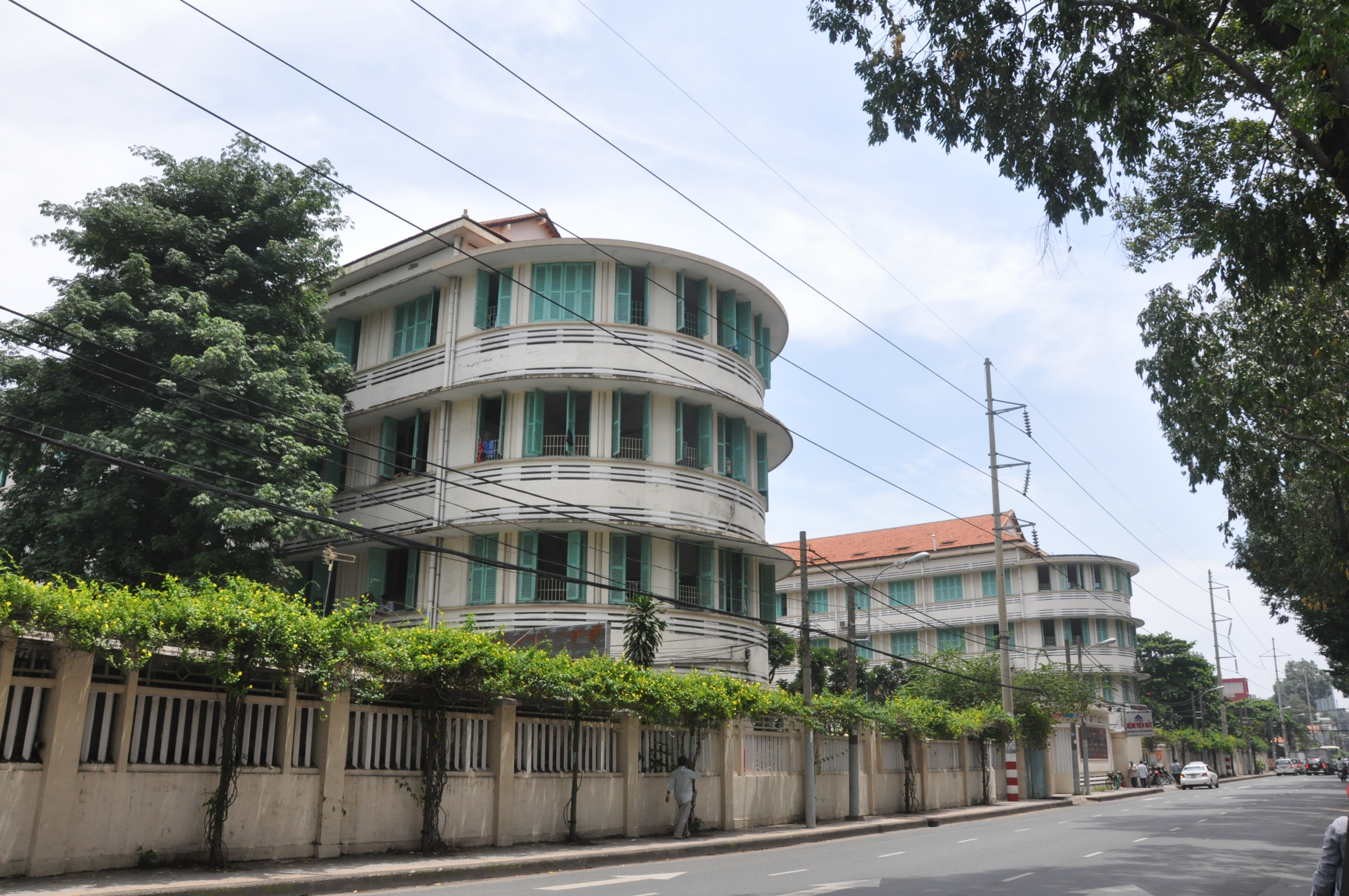
Ho Chi Minh City Eye Hospital, a high specialized hospital of eye in the Southern Vietnam.

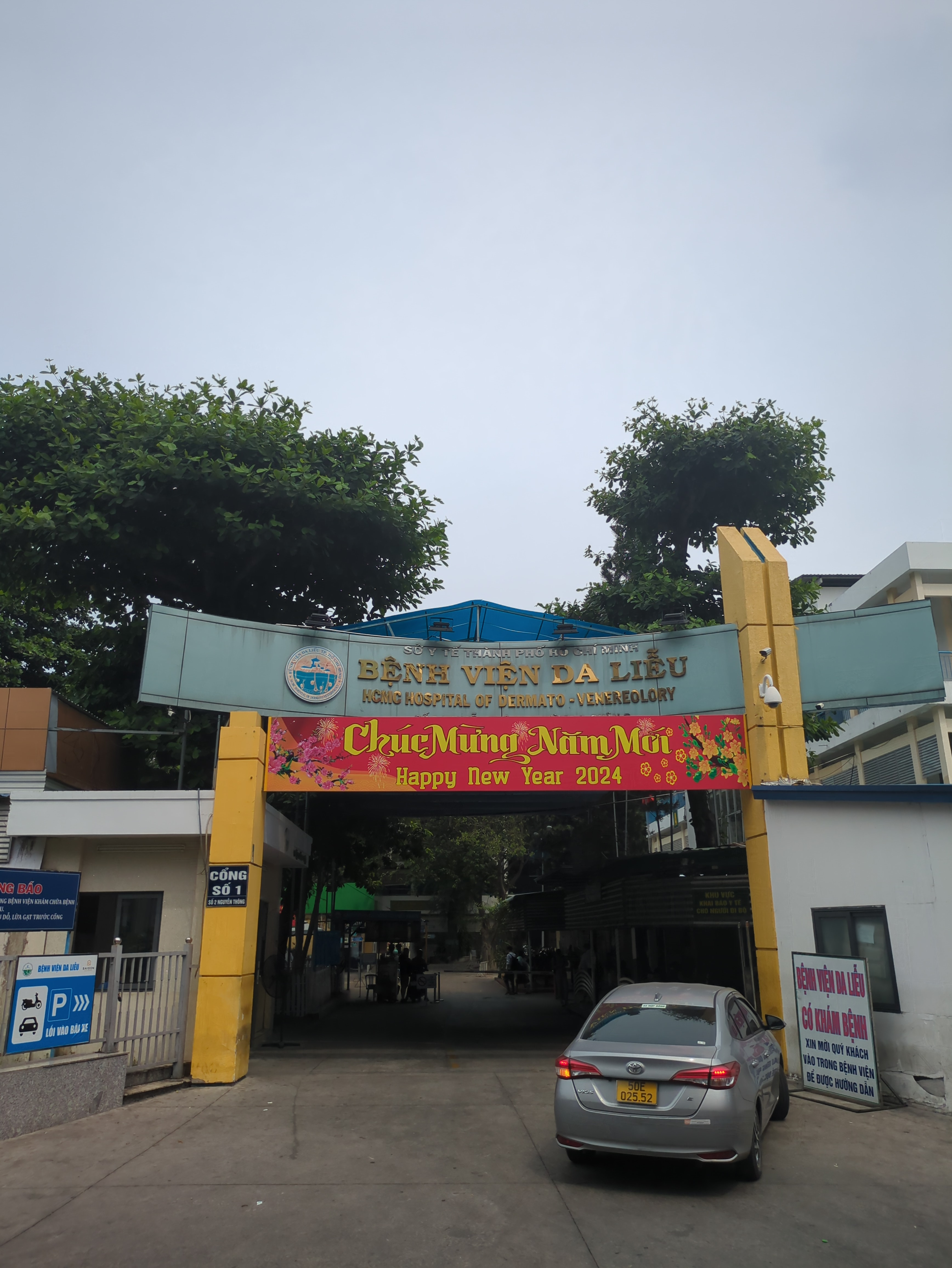
Ho Chi Minh City Dermatology Hospital

Name	Address	Website	Note
Ho Chi Minh City Dermatology Hospital	No. 2 Nguyễn Thông	bvdl.org.vn	
Ho Chi Minh City Transport Hospital	72/3 Trần Quốc Toản		Headquarters
Ho Chi Minh City Eye Hospital	280 Điện Biên Phủ	benhvienmat.com	Initially known as Clinique Saint-Paul [vi]
Ho Chi Minh City Traditional Medicine Hospital	179 Nam Kỳ Khởi Nghĩa		Headquarters. Formerly the Dung Anh Maternity Private Hospital

== Notable places ==
=== Religious places ===
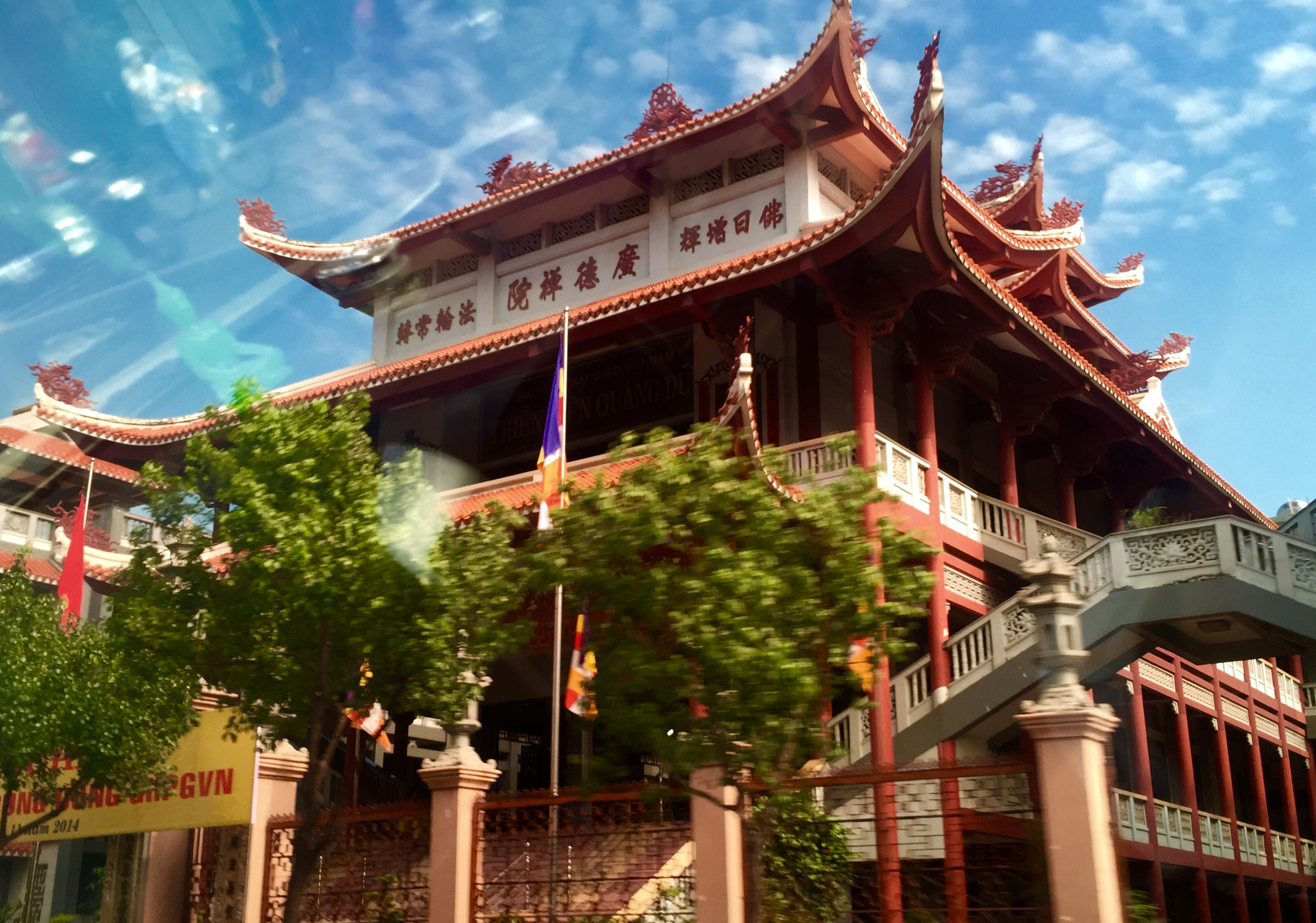
Quảng Đức Monastery

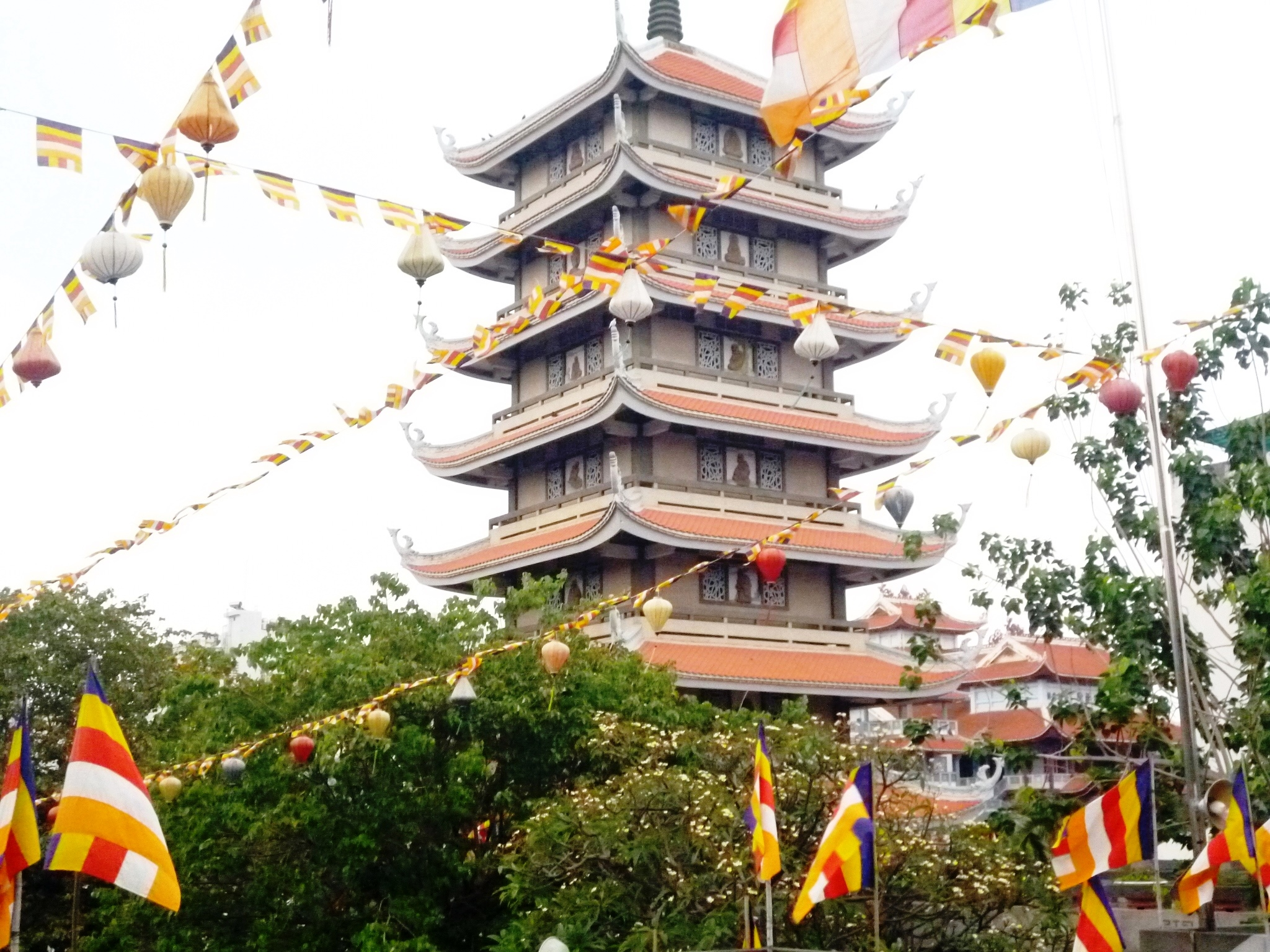
Vĩnh Nghiêm Pagoda, Guanyin Tower (Bảo tháp Quán Thế Âm)

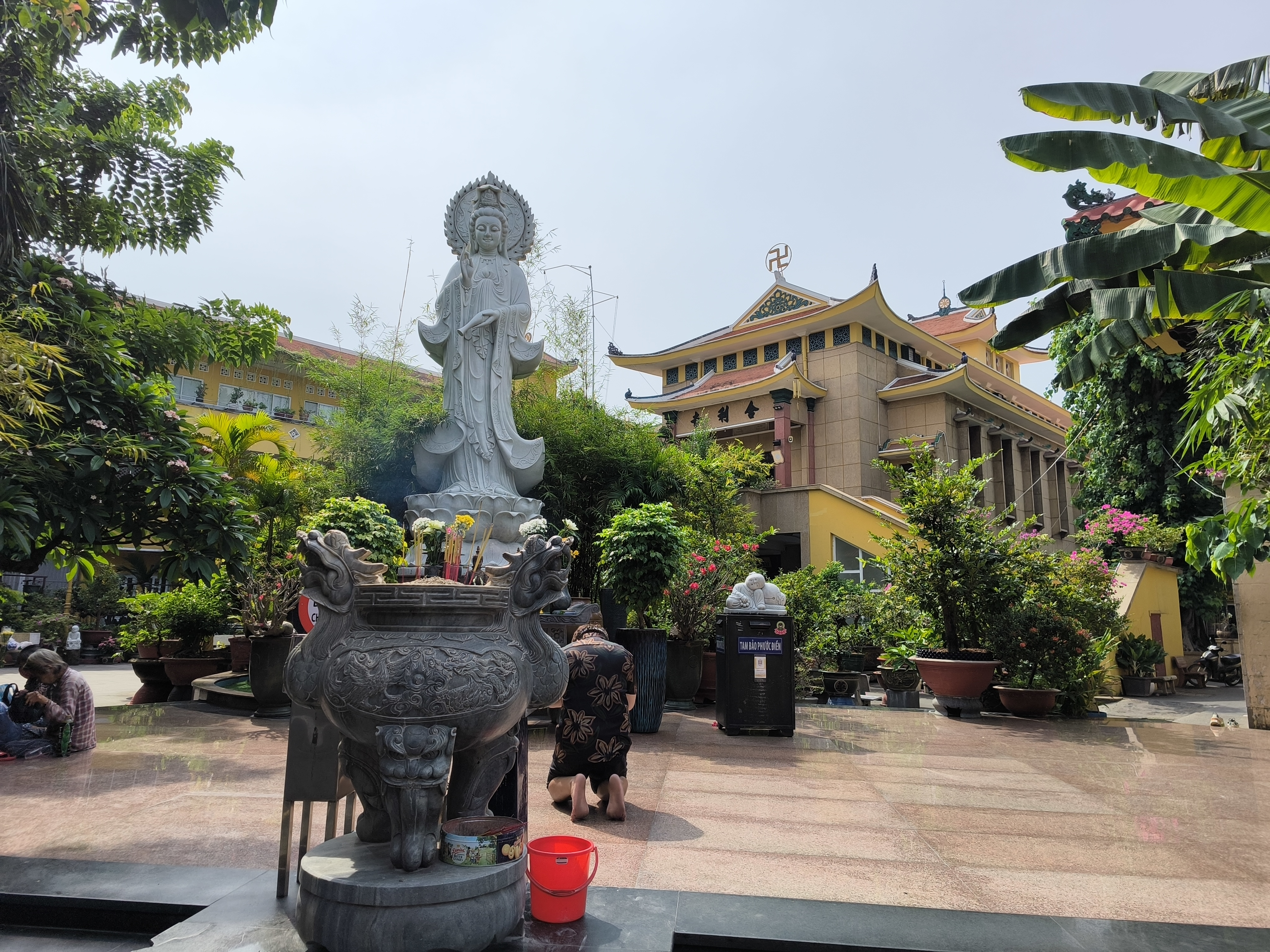
Xá Lợi Pagoda

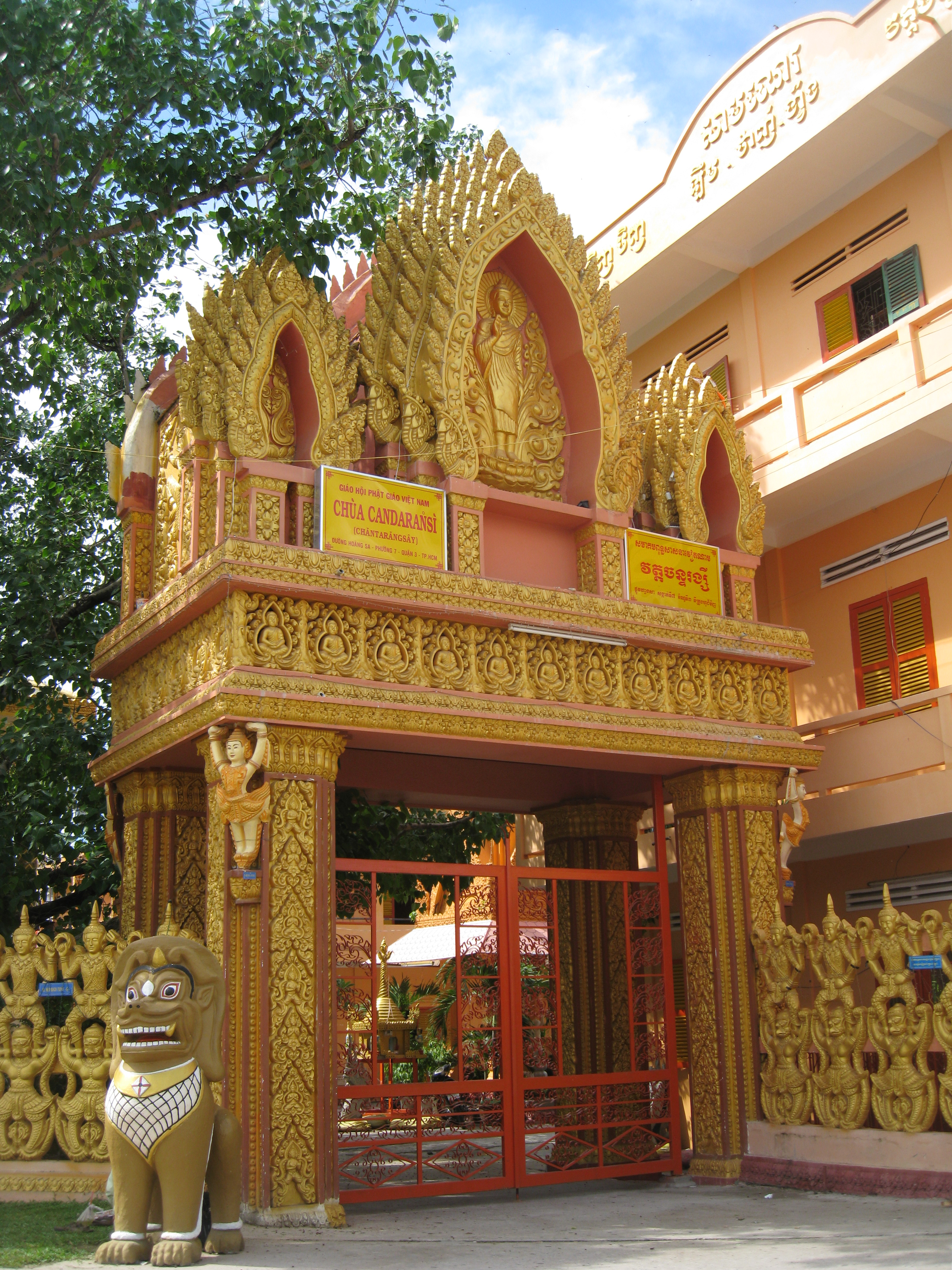
Chantarangsay Pagoda, entrance on Hoàng Sa Street

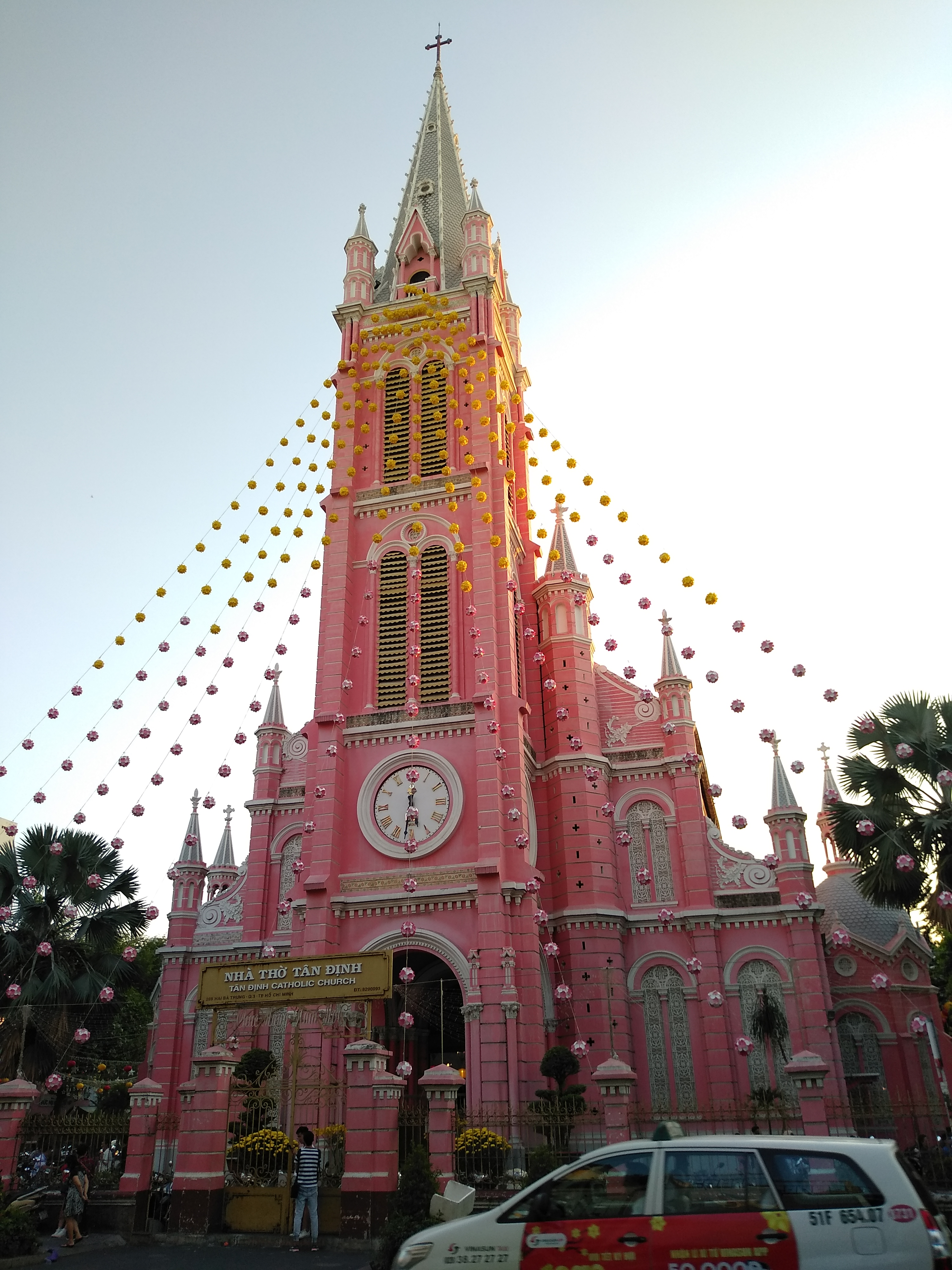
Tân Định Church decorated in the sunset

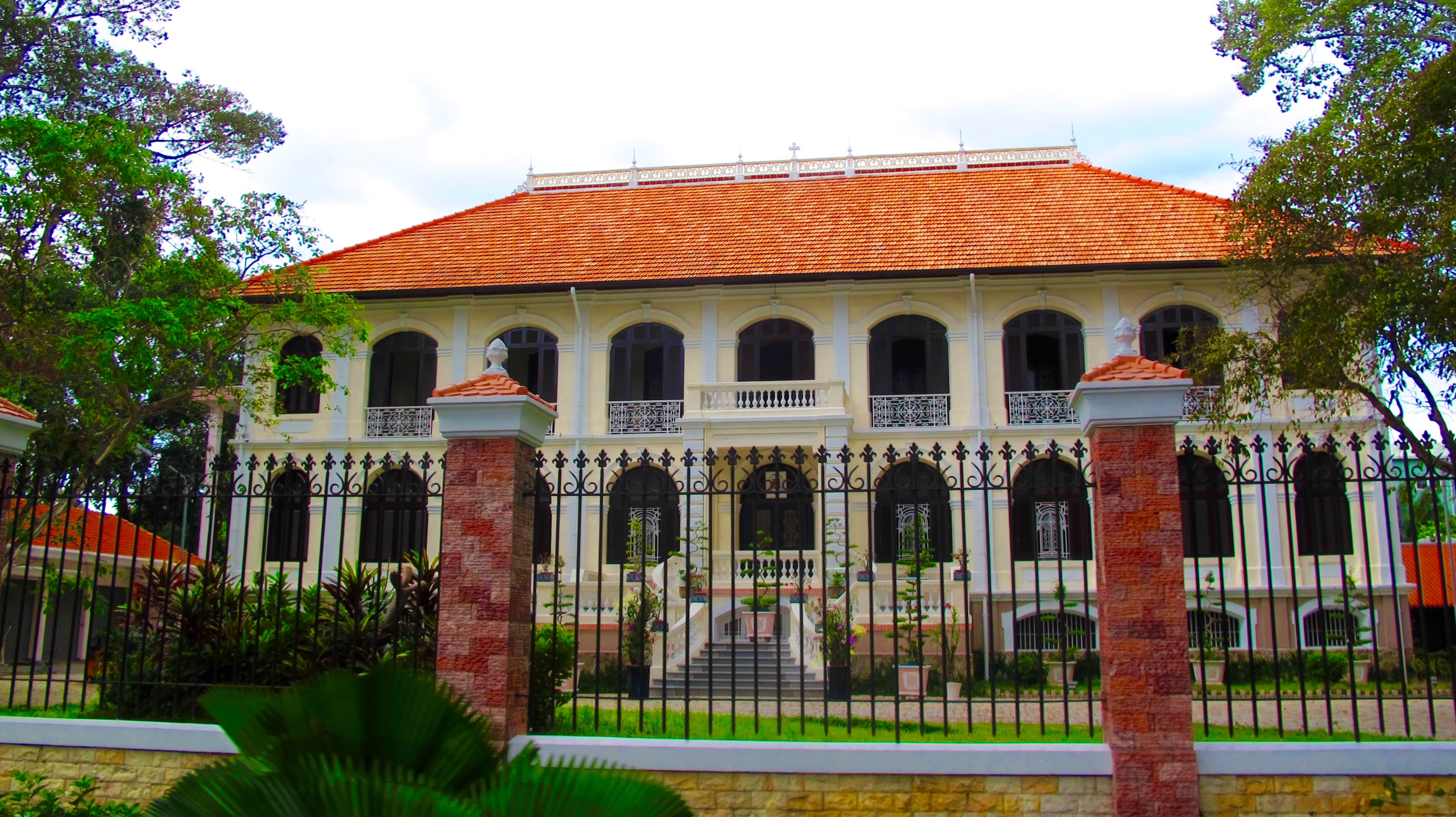
Archbishop Residence of Saigon at the corner of Nguyễn Đình Chiểu and Trần Quốc Thảo street
- Tân Định Church: 289 Hai Bà Trưng Street
- Vĩnh Nghiêm Pagoda: 339 Nam Kỳ Khởi Nghĩa Street
- Quảng Đức Monastery [vi]: 294 Nam Kỳ Khởi Nghĩa Street
- Xá Lợi Pagoda: 89 Bà Huyện Thanh Quan Road
- Chantarangsay Pagoda: 164/235 Trần Quốc Thảo Road

=== Historical and cultural places ===
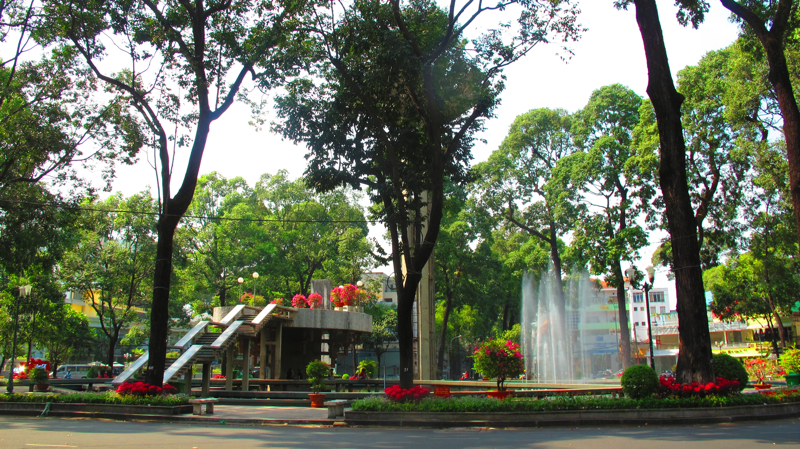
Turtle Lake

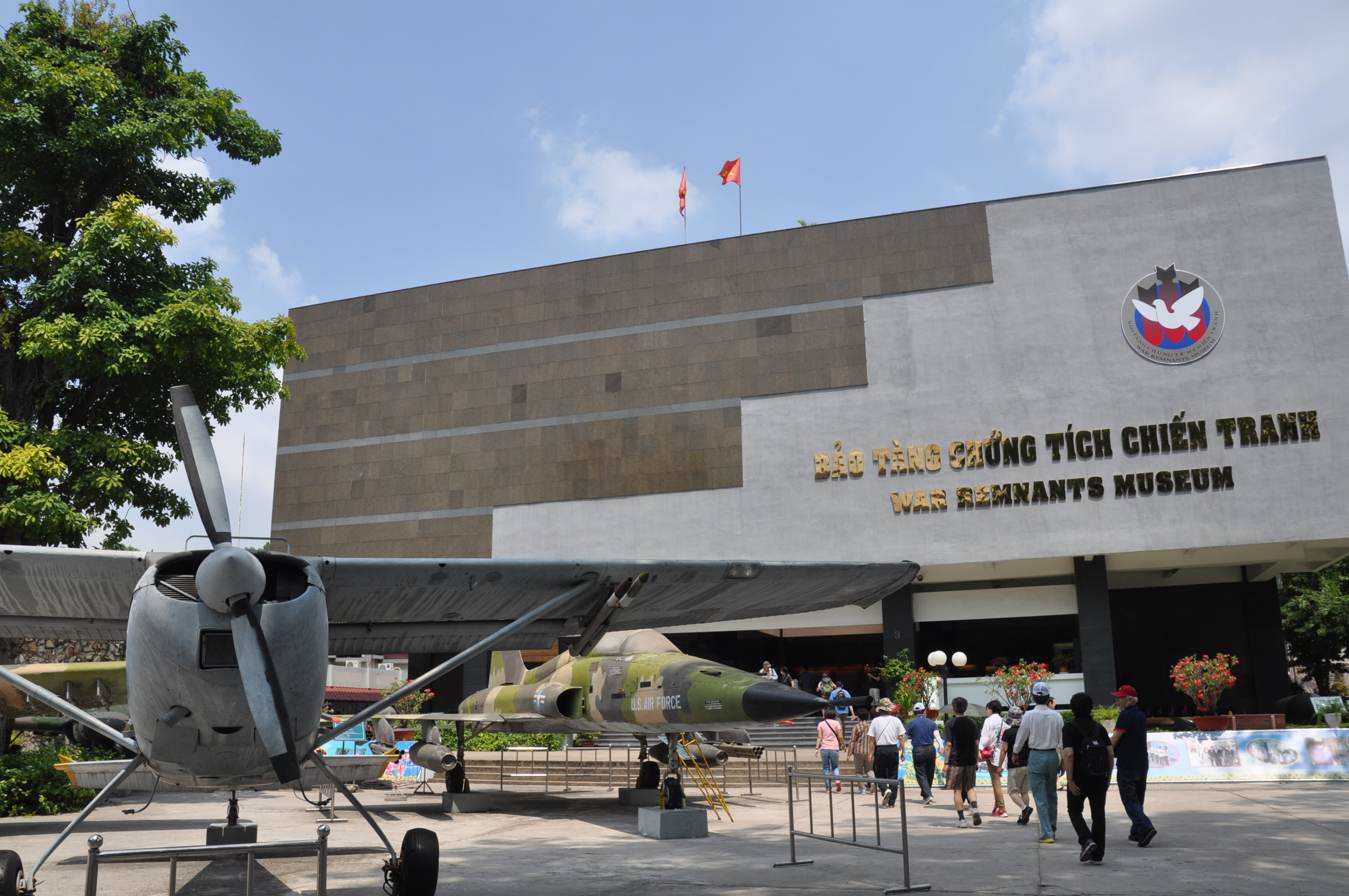
War Remnants Museum

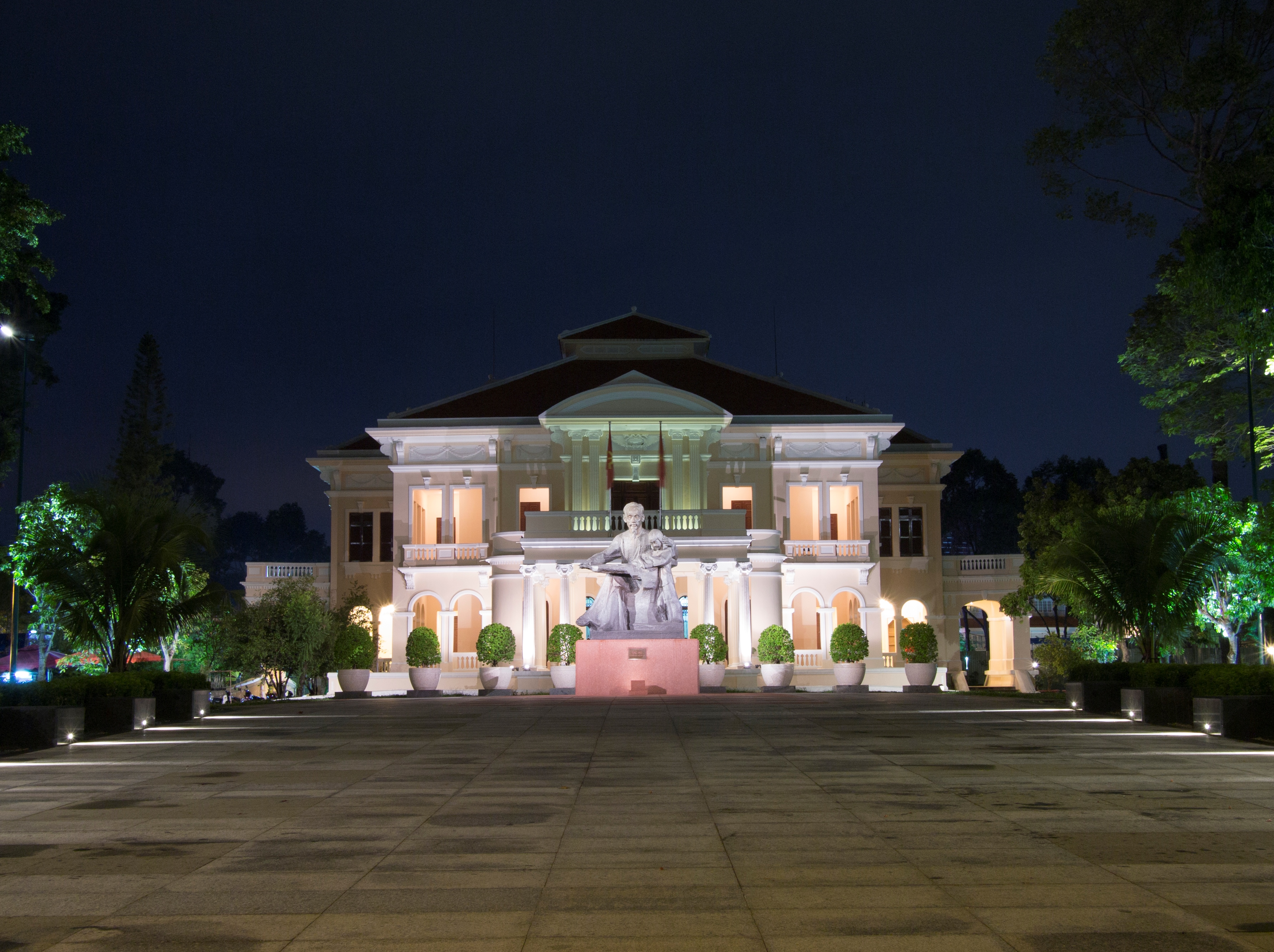
Statue of Ho Chi Minh with children at the HCMC Children's House (relocated from the Nguyễn Huệ Boulevard)
- Turtle Lake: No.1 International Square
- War Remnants Museum: 28 Võ Văn Tần Street
- Southern Women's Museum: 202 Võ Thị Sáu Street
- Ho Chi Minh City Children's House: 169 Nam Kỳ Khởi Nghĩa Street

== Consulates ==
List of Consulate General in Xuân Hòa
Nation	Address
China	175 Hai Bà Trưng
Japan	261 Điện Biên Phủ
India	214 Võ Thị Sáu
Palau	Estar Tower, 149 Võ Văn Tần
Portugal	151 Nam Kỳ Khởi Nghĩa
Russia	40 Bà Huyện Thanh Quan
Thailand	77 Trần Quốc Thảo
