= Huỳnh Thị Xậm =

Vietnamese librarian (1978-)

- Born: 1978 (age 47–48); Hậu Giang, Vietnam
- Education: Ho Chi Minh City Open University
- Occupations: Librarian, teacher, painter
- Known for: Disability rights activism

Huỳnh Thị Xậm (born 1978) is a Vietnamese librarian and disability advocate who in 2017 was named as one of the BBC's 100 Women in recognition for her work improving literacy rates among disabled people in Vietnam.

== Biography ==
Xậm was born in Long Mỹ district, Hậu Giang province, within the Mekong Delta, the third of six children born to labourer parents. She was born with bond hands and her left foot paralysed, with her only having mobility in four toes on her right foot.

Due to Xậm's disability, she faced barriers in accessing adequate education. Her access to education was also negatively affected by her family's low income as well as a lack of awareness among local teachers on how to support disabled children.

The death of Xậm's father, while causing additional financial problems for the family, also motivated Xậm to return to school at the age of 15, where she learned to write by using her right foot. The local chapter of the Communist Party of Vietnam donated a dinghy to help her travel to school. Against the odds, Xậm graduated high school at the age of 27

In 2006, after graduating high school, Xậm moved to Ho Chi Minh City to study at the Ho Chi Minh City Vocational Centre for People with Disabilities and Orphans. In 2009, she started studying for a degree in sociology at Ho Chi Minh City Open University, graduating in 2013.

Following her graduation, Xậm returned to the Ho Chi Minh City Vocational Centre for People with Disabilities and Orphans, where she started work as a librarian. Xậm also started to teach literacy classes to help address the number of students coming to the centre who were illiterate. Due to most of the students having disabilities, Xậm also learned Braille and Vietnamese Sign Language in order to teach literacy to blind and deaf students, respectively. Xậm is also an accomplished painter, teaching art to students and selling paintings.

In 2020, it was reported that Xậm had taken a step back from her role due to the declining health of her mother, as well as her own health issues. As of 2020, Xậm lives in Hóc Môn district, Ho Chi Minh City, with her mother, sister, and niece.

== Recognition ==
In 2006, Vietnam Women's Union named Xậm "the woman who touched the heart of Vietnam" due to her efforts to get an education in light of her disability.
