= Turtle Lake (Ho Chi Minh City) =

Lake in Ho Chi Minh City, Vietnam

International Square
- Public square, Fountain, Intersection
- Công trường Quốc Tế
- Nickname: Turtle Lake
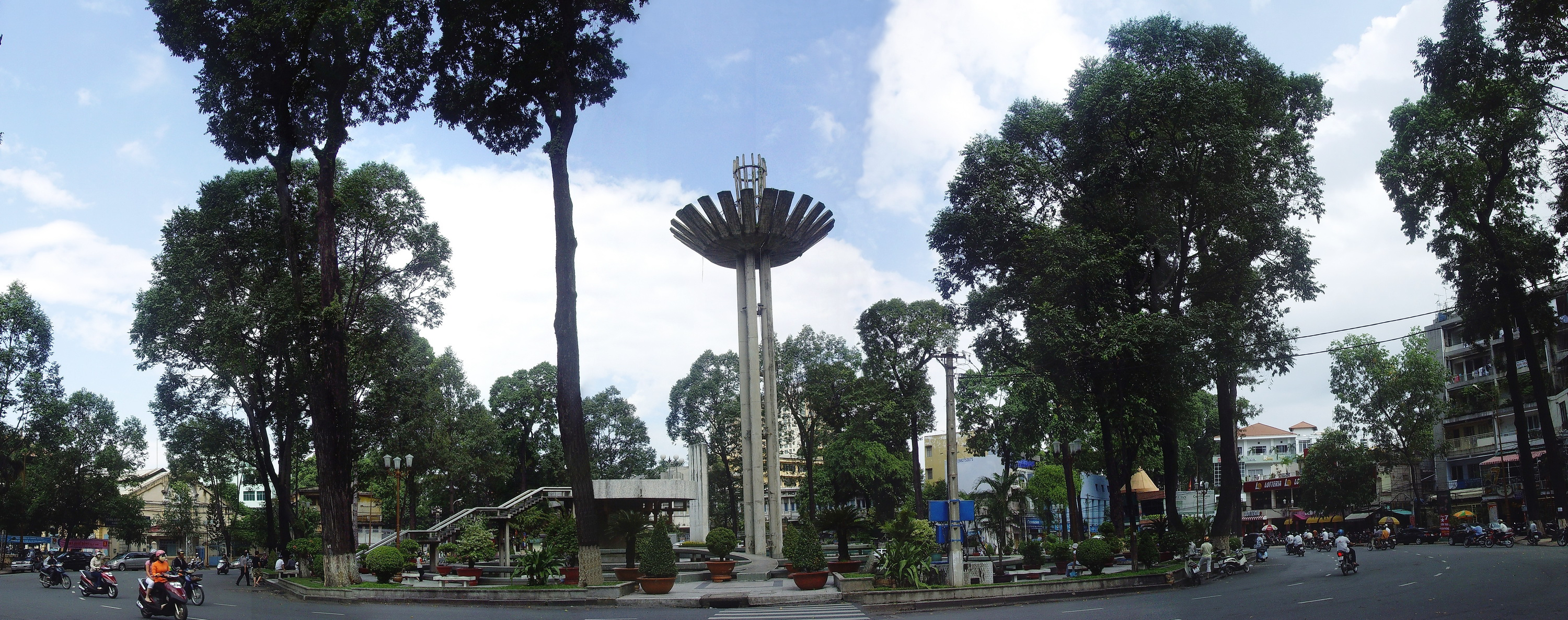
- Design: Nguyễn Kỳ
- Completed: 1965 or 1967
- Height: 34 metres (112 ft)
- Area: 3,800 square metres (0.94 acres)
- Location: Xuân Hòa Ward, District 3, Ho Chi Minh City
- Public transit: L3 L4 Turtle Lake station (planned)
- Interactive map of International Square
- Coordinates: 10°46′57″N 106°41′45″E

Turtle Lake (Vietnamese: Hồ Con Rùa) is a lake and a fountain surrounded by a traffic roundabout officially known as International Square (Vietnamese: Công trường Quốc Tế) in District 3, Ho Chi Minh City, Vietnam. Located at the 4-way intersection of Phạm Ngọc Thạch, Trần Cao Vân and Võ Văn Tần streets, the lake is adorned with a modernist monument designed by architect Nguyễn Kỳ, and unveiled in 1969. Prior to this, a 1878-built French water tower existed, which was replaced by a small lake and monument in 1921. The area is popular for street food vendors, and in 2023 was developed into a pedestrian area.

In future, under the lake will have an eponymous underground station for two Ho Chi Minh City Metro lines:

- Line 3: a northeast-west line goes from National Route 1 in Tân Kiên, Bình Chánh District then along some throughfares of Kinh Dương Vương-Hồng Bàng, then through the downtown via streets of Nguyễn Thị Minh Khai with Xô Viết Nghệ Tĩnh and continue goes along the National Route 13 to end at Hiệp Bình station in Thủ Đức (from there, it will continue to Bình Dương via Bình Dương Metro)
- Line 4: a north-south radical axis metro line of the city from District 12, goes through Bến Thành and ends at Hiệp Phước Port in Nhà Bè.

== Surrounding area ==
Some of notable buildings around the lake are:

- Independence Palace
- Notre-Dame Cathedral Basilica of Saigon
- Ho Chi Minh City University of Economics (Headquarters; Campus A)
- Ho Chi Minh City University of Architecture
- Ho Chi Minh City Youth Cultural House
- Centec Tower – Hôtel des Arts Saigon Complex
- Daikin Tower (also known as Daikin Vietnam Headquarter Building)
- Diamond Plaza

April 30 Park is also around the lake.
