= Southern Women's Museum =

Vietnamese museum

- Bảo tàng Phụ nữ Nam Bộ
- Established: April 29, 1985
- Location: 202 Võ Thị Sáu, Xuân Hòa, Ho Chi Minh City, Vietnam
- Coordinates: 10.7806°N 106.6883°E
- Type: History
- Director: Nguyễn Thị Thắm
- Website: https://baotangphunu.com/

The Southern Women's Museum (Vietnamese: Bảo tàng Phụ nữ Nam Bộ) is a history museum in Ho Chi Minh City, Vietnam, dedicated to the contributions of women in southern Vietnam to national building, defense, and cultural preservation. Established in 1985, it houses over 31,000 artifacts, focusing on revolutionary struggles, traditional crafts, and ethnographic elements. Recognized as a Class I museum by the Ministry of Culture, Sports and Tourism in 2024, it serves as a key educational and touristic site.

== History ==
The museum originated as the Southern Women's Tradition House (Nhà truyền thống Phụ nữ Nam Bộ), evolving from a 1982 initiative by over 200 members of the Ho Chi Minh City Women's Union to establish a dedicated space for women's history. It was inaugurated on April 29, 1985, marking the 10th anniversary of southern liberation and national unification. The building, formerly the residence of Nguyễn Ngọc Loan (police chief during the Republic of Vietnam era), was repurposed under the leadership of the Southern Women's History Research Group, headed by Nguyễn Thị Thập—a prominent figure in the Vietnam Women's Union—and 13 retired female revolutionaries.

In 1998, the museum received the First Class Labor Medal. By 2020, it was designated a new tourism site in Ho Chi Minh City, and in 2024, it achieved Class I status. As of 2025, it celebrated its 40th anniversary with exhibitions reflecting on its collections and growth.

== Building and facilities ==
Occupying 5,410.5 m², the four-story structure includes 2,000 m² of exhibition space across 10 rooms, a conference hall seating nearly 1,000, and over 700 m² of storage. Admission is free for all visitors.

== Collections ==
The museum manages 31,360 artifacts, with 929 on display and the remainder in storage. These include 16,739 physical objects and 14,621 documents, films, and photos. Over two-thirds relate to revolutionary wars, while one-third cover cultural themes. Artifacts are categorized into 24 collections, including six rare sets. Notable items include approximately 200 traditional áo dài garments donated by prominent women, such as those worn by Nguyễn Thị Kim Ngân, Nguyễn Thị Bình, and Tôn Nữ Thị Ninh. The library holds over 11,000 books on women's studies.

== Exhibitions ==
=== Permanent exhibitions ===
Eleven core themes explore southern women's roles, including traditions predating the Communist Party, interactions with Hồ Chí Minh, organizational development, political and military involvement, foreign affairs, colonial imprisonment, worship of female deities, clothing and jewelry, and traditional weaving.

=== Temporary and special exhibitions ===
The museum hosts rotating displays, such as "War Relics and Memories" (2024, featuring 93 artifacts and 60 images on women's wartime experiences), "Journey of 40 Years: Stories from Artifacts" (2025, for the anniversary), and "Traditional Weaving of Mạ Women" (2025, marking Vietnam's Cultural Heritage Day). Earlier exhibitions include "Heroic Mothers of Ho Chi Minh City" (2012) and "Women on the COVID-19 Frontlines" (2021).

== See also ==
- Vietnamese Women's Museum (Hanoi counterpart)
