= District 3, Ho Chi Minh City =

District 3 Quận 3
- Urban district
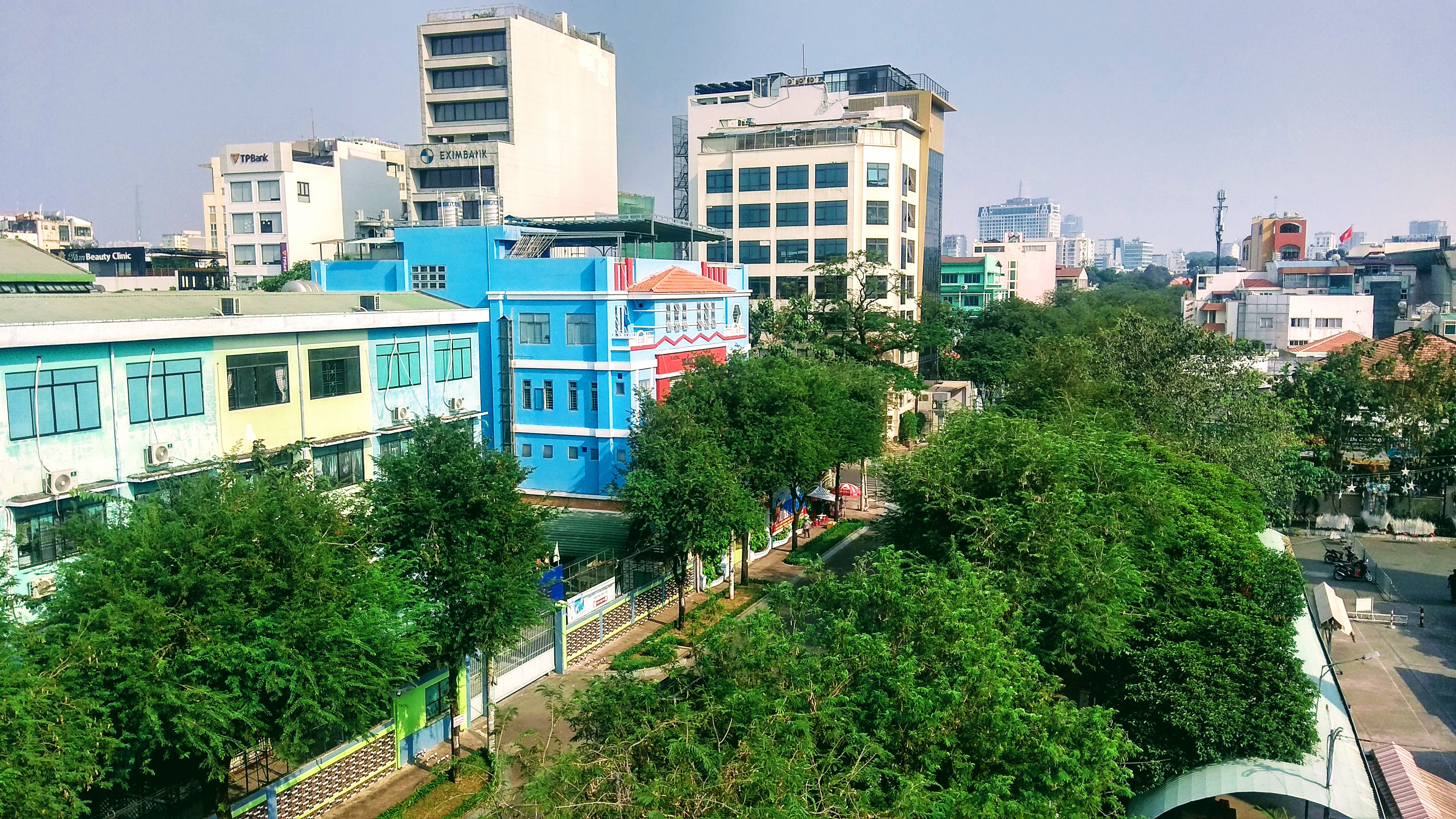
- Scenery of District 3 around Bà Huyện Thanh Quan Street

- Position in Ho Chi Minh City

- Location within Vietnam
- Coordinates: 10°46′55″N 106°41′7″E
- Country: Vietnam
- Centrally Governed City: Ho Chi Minh
- Seat: 99 Trần Quốc Thảo
- Wards: 12 phường

Area
  - Total: 4.92 km^{2} (1.90 sq mi)

Population (2022)
  - Total: 220,375
  - Density: 44,800/km^{2} (116,000/sq mi)

Demographics
  - Main ethnic groups: predominantly Kinh
- Time zone: UTC+07 (ICT)
- Website: quan3.hochiminhcity.gov.vn

District 3 (Vietnamese: Quận 3) is a former urban district of Ho Chi Minh City, the largest city in Vietnam. Together with District 1, District 3 was considered the bustling heart of the city, with a multitude of businesses, religious sites, historical buildings and tourist attractions.

== History ==
Established in December 1920, it was one of the first districts of Saigon.

== Geography ==
This district has a total area of 4.92 km^{2}, located in the city center and borders:

- District 1 to the east by Hai Bà Trưng and Nguyễn Thị Minh Khai Street
- District 10 to the south and southwest by Điện Biên Phủ, Nguyễn Thượng Hiền and Cách Mạng Tháng 8 Street
- Phú Nhuận District to the north by part of Nhiêu Lộc – Thị Nghè Channel (and the historic Canal de Ceinture on maps before 1975)
- Tân Bình District to the west and northwest by Nhiêu Lộc – Thị Nghè Channel (and the historic Canal de Ceinture on maps before 1975).

It is the location of Xá Lợi Pagoda, the largest in the city. The Vĩnh Nghiêm Pagoda is also located in District 3, next to Công Lý Bridge and on Nam Kỳ Khởi Nghĩa Street, directly connected to Tan Son Nhat International Airport. There are many French-style villas in this district as in the French Indochina period, District 1 is a business district then District 3 is the residential district for bureaucrats and wealthy families. Some notable offices are located in District 3 such as the Royal Thai Consulate (77 Trần Quốc Thảo).

=== Wards ===
District 3 is subdivided into twelve wards (phường), eleven of which are numbered.

- Ward 1
- Ward 2
- Ward 3
- Ward 4
- Ward 5
- Ward 9
- Ward 10
- Ward 11
- Ward 12
- Ward 13
- Ward 14
- Võ Thị Sáu

== Transportation ==
=== Streets ===
- Cư xá Đô Thành
- Đường 2 Cư xá Đô Thành
- Đường 3 Cư xá Đô Thành
- Đường 4 Cư xá Đô thành
- Đường 7 Cư xá Đô Thành
- Bà Huyện Thanh Quan
- Bàn Cờ
- Cách Mạng Tháng 8
- Cao Thắng
- Điện Biên Phủ
- Hai Bà Trưng
- Hoàng Sa
- Hồ Xuân Hương
- Huỳnh Tịnh Của
- Kỳ Đồng
- Lê Ngô Cát
- Lê Quý Đôn
- Lê Văn Sỹ
- Lý Chính Thắng
- Lý Thái Tổ
- Nam Kỳ Khởi Nghĩa
- Ngô Thời Nhiệm
- Nguyễn Đình Chiểu
- Nguyễn Hiền
- Nguyễn Phúc Nguyên
- Nguyễn Sơn Hà
- Nguyễn Thị Diệu
- Nguyễn Thị Minh Khai
- Nguyễn Thiện Thuật
- Nguyễn Thông
- Nguyễn Thượng Hiền
- Nguyễn Văn Minh
- Phạm Đình Toái
- Phạm Ngọc Thạch
- Pasteur
- Rạch Bùng Binh
- Sư Thiện Chiếu
- Trần Cao Vân
- Trần Huy Liệu
- Trần Minh Quyền
- Trần Quang Diệu
- Trần Quốc Thảo
- Trần Quốc Toản
- Trần Văn Đang
- Trương Định
- Trương Quyền
- Trường Sa
- Tú Xương
- Võ Thị Sáu
- Võ Văn Tần
- Vườn Chuối

=== Watercourse and bridges ===
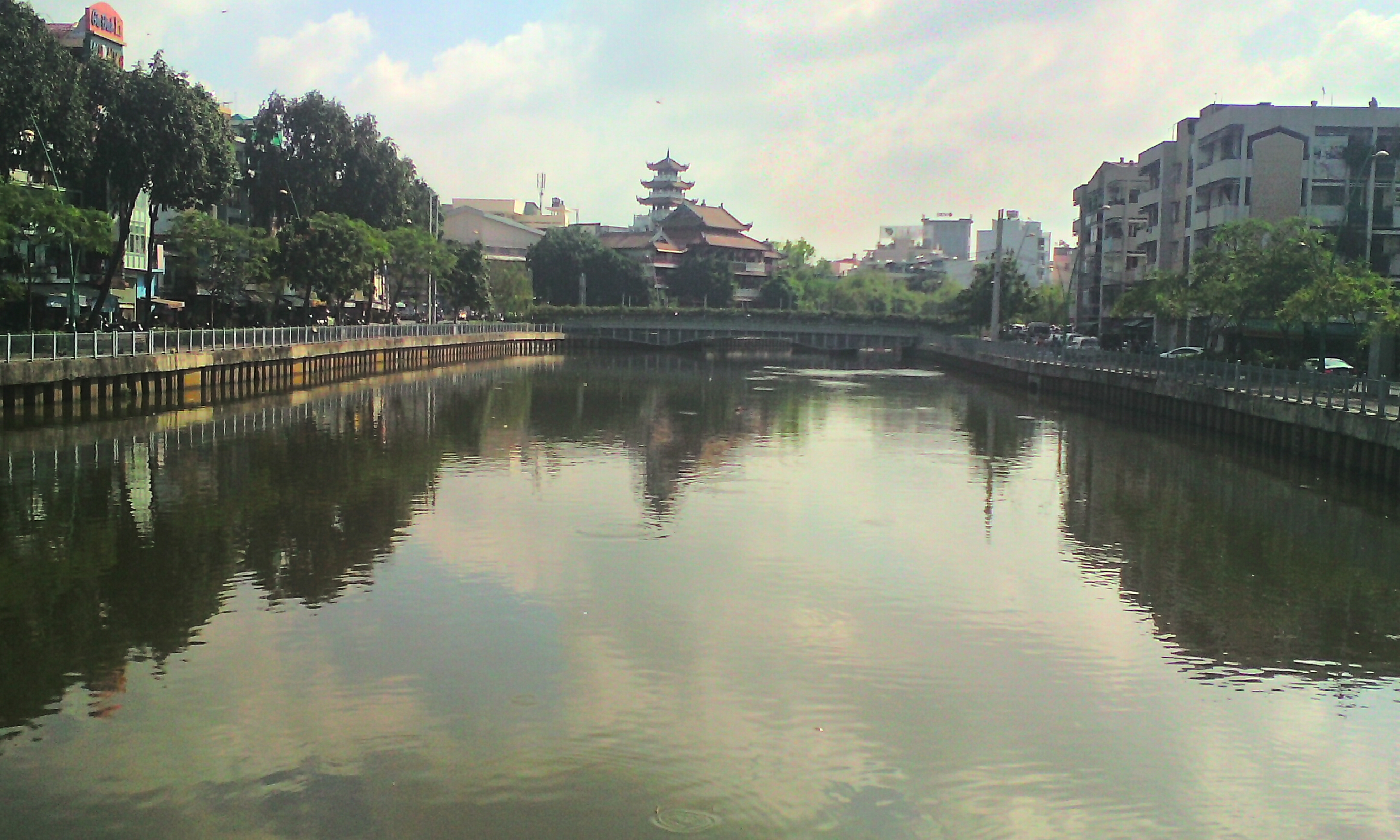
Nhiêu Lộc - Thị Nghè canal in District 3

Part of the Nhiêu Lộc - Thị Nghè canal runs through the district. There are 8 bridges in District 3 crossing this canal:

- Bridge 6
- Bridge 7
- Bridge 8
- Trần Quang Diệu Bridge
- Bridge 9
- Lê Văn Sĩ Bridge
- Công Lý Bridge
- Kiệu Bridge

=== Railway ===
District 3 hosts Saigon railway station, the largest and most important railway hub in the country. As the last stop on the North-South line, this station is connected to Bình Triệu railway station.

District 3 also has a rapid transit, including an underconstructed Line 2 run along with Cách Mạng Tháng 8 Street, two were planned are Line 3 run along with Nguyễn Thị Minh Khai Street and Line 4 run along with Hai Bà Trưng Street and has a station in Turtle Lake.

== Demography ==
As of 2022, the district had a population of 220,375.

== Government ==
The People's Committee's headquarters is located at No. 99, Trần Quốc Thảo street, Ward 7. Before 2015, it was located at No. 185 Cách Mạng Tháng 8 street.

The district also hosts the hall of the city's Party Committee at No. 111 Bà Huyện Thanh Quan street.

== Healthcare ==
District 3 in Ho Chi Minh City is home to several medical facilities, including Bình Dân General Hospital, which offers tertiary care in General surgery, Pediatric surgery, Hepatology, and Cardiothoracic surgery. The district also hosts specialized institutions such as the Public Dermatology and Venereology Hospital, the Public Eye Hospital of Ho Chi Minh City,Prima Saigon Medical Center and the Public Traditional Medicine Hospital. Additionally, the Public Otolaryngology Hospital and Prima Saigon Eye Hospital are located in the area, contributing to the city's healthcare services.

Some Hospitals in District 3, Ho Chi Minh City

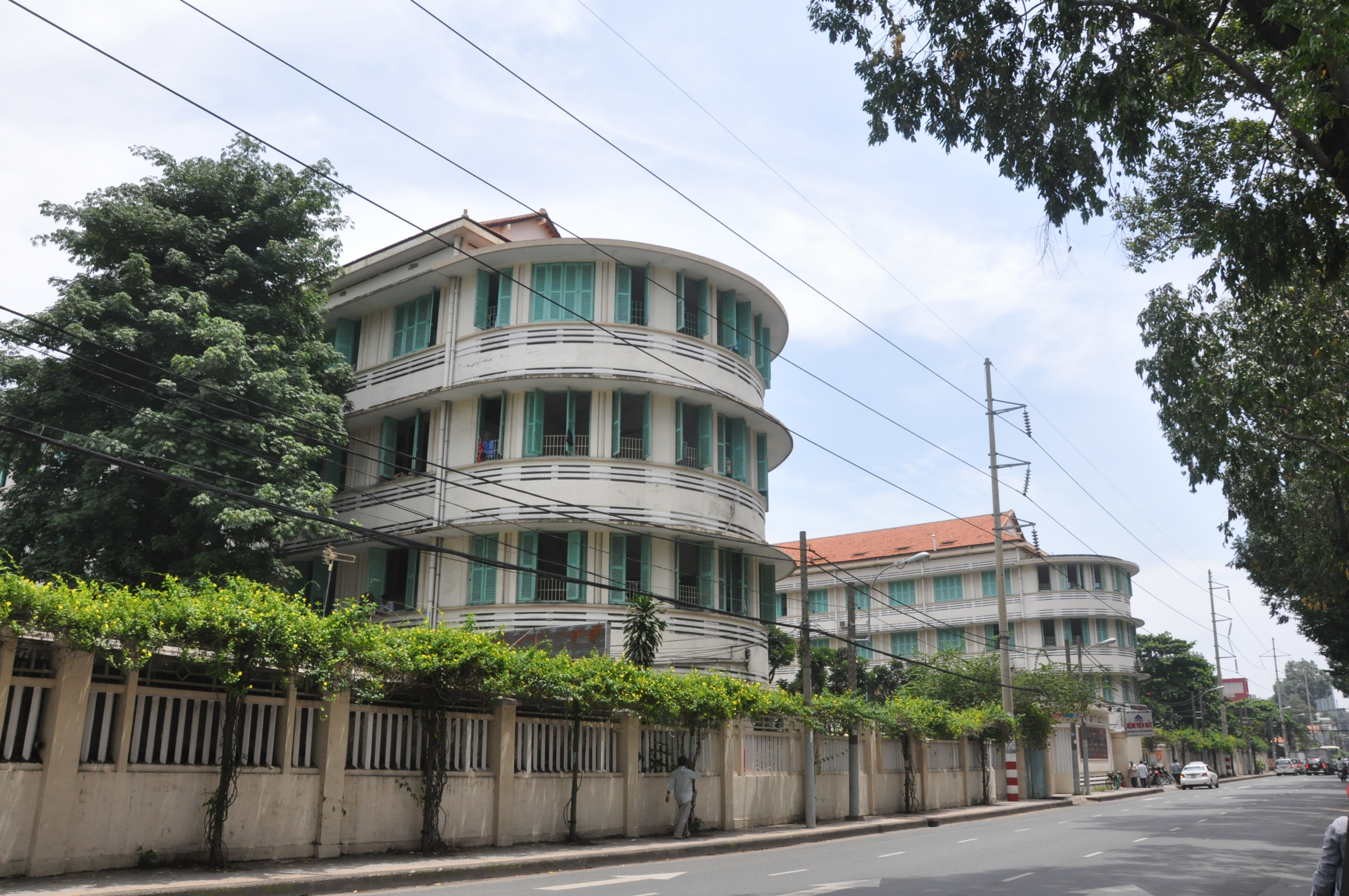
The Public Eye Hospital of Ho Chi Minh City is the leading tertiary care eye hospital in the South of Vietnam. Originally, it was the Clinique Saint-Paul or in Vietnamese as Dưỡng đường (or Bệnh xá) Xanh-pôn

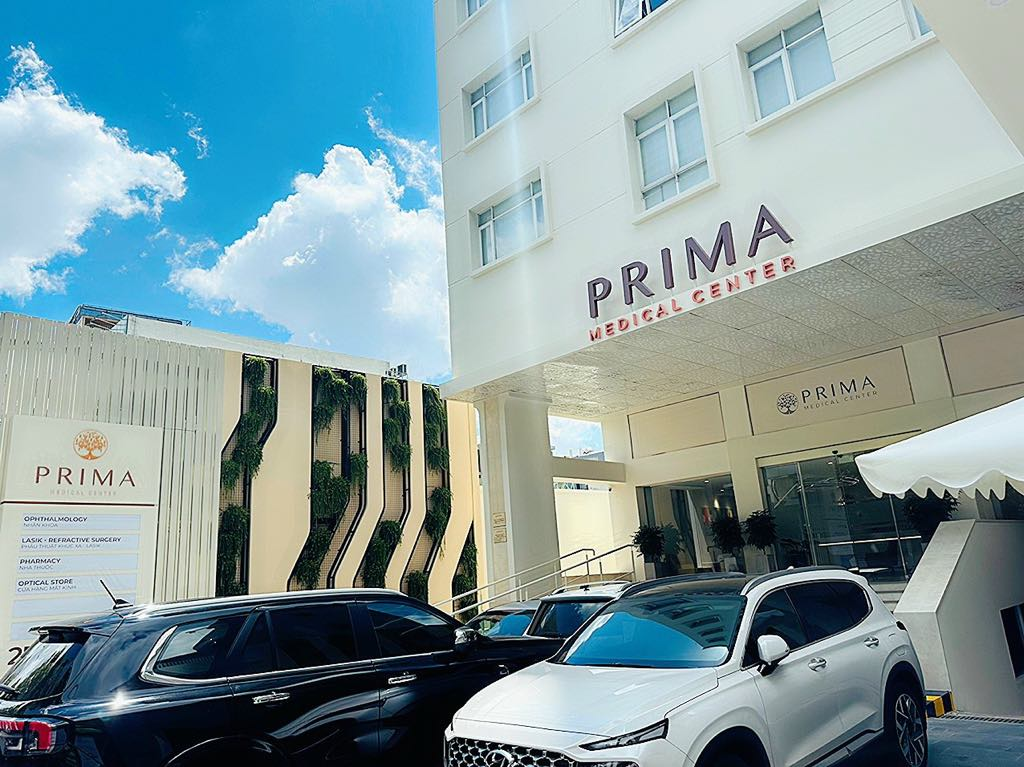
Prima Saigon Medical Center, the first Vietnamese member of World Association of Eye Hospitals, treating approximately 120,000 patients and performing 15,000 major surgical procedures annually, with net revenue of US$18 million.

== Education ==
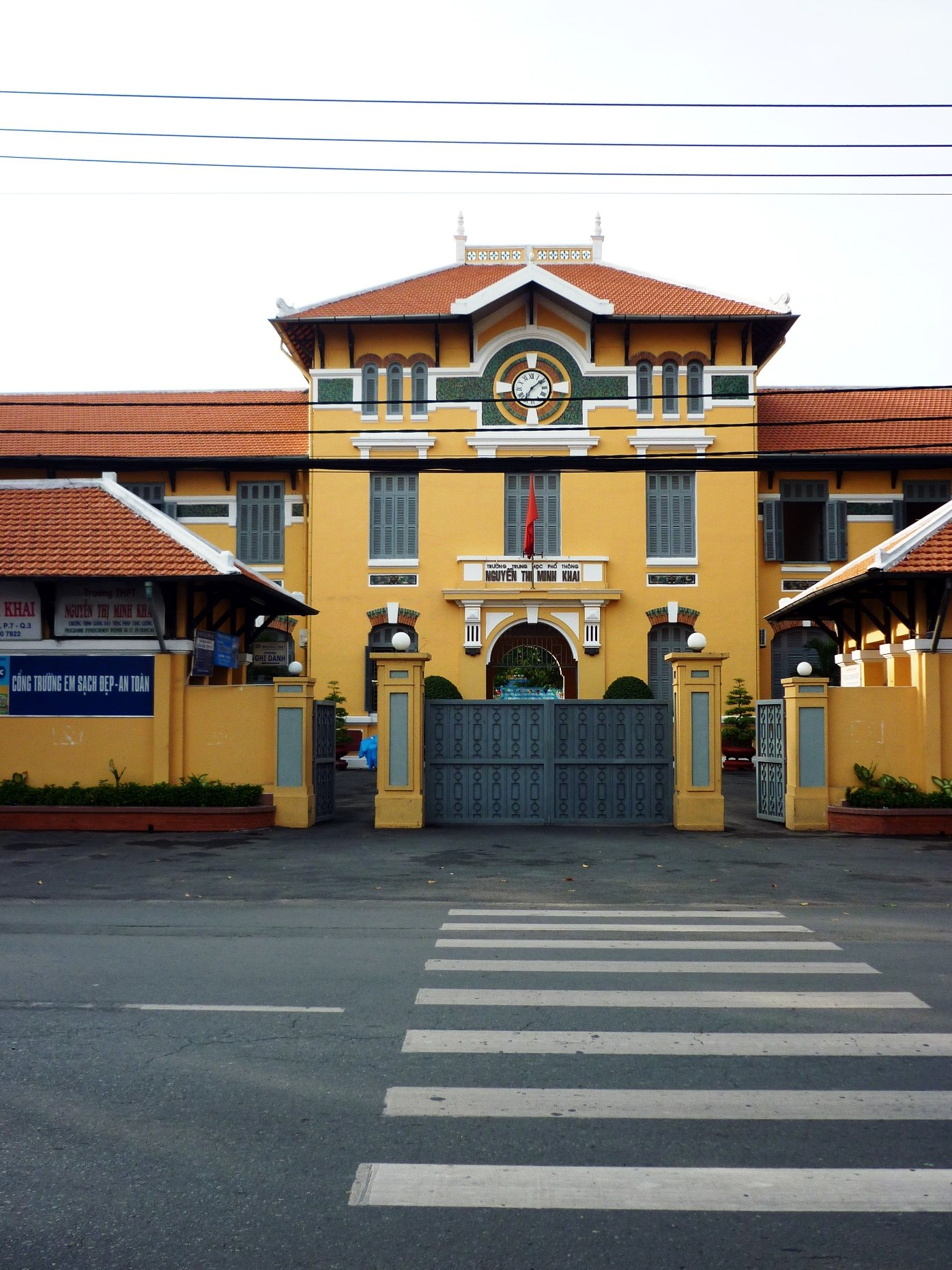
Nguyễn Thị Minh Khai, one of the oldest and most famous schools in the city

Headquarters of the district's Division of Education and Training is located at No. 322 Nguyễn Thiện Thuật street.

In District 3, there are 5 public high schools, including Nguyễn Thị Minh Khai High School, Lê Quý Đôn High School, Marie Curie High School, Nguyễn Thị Diệu High School and Lê Thị Hồng Gấm High School. It also hosts facilities of many universities like Pedagogical University, University of Economics, University of Architecture, Open University and Saigon University. British International School Vietnam's Tú Xương Primary campus is located in this district.

== Tourism and attractions ==
District 3 was once listed by Time Out as one of 50 coolest neighbourhoods in the world in 2019.
