= World Association of Eye Hospitals =

International network of eye hospitals

- Established: June 3, 2007; 18 years ago
- Type: Industry association
- Headquarters: Worldwide
- Key people: Brendon Gardner (Chair)
- Website: www.waeh.org

The World Association of Eye Hospitals (WAEH) is an international network of eye hospitals, founded in 2007 in Rotterdam. It advocates ophthalmology practice through social outreach and by providing information on eye care and health care administration.

== Activities ==
- Exchange information and knowledge
- Exchange of personnel to enhance international network and exchange of best practice
- Stimulate international scientific cooperation between members

== Admission criteria (full member) ==
The admission criteria include specialising at an eye hospital or eye department, with at least five sub-specialities (cornea, glaucoma, cataract, retina, pediatric, neuro, oculoplastics and uveitis), having carried out at least 5000 operations, possessing research and resident training programs, provision of community services, primary care and emergency service, and meeting international and national quality standards.

== Members of the Association ==
- Aier Eye Hospital (China)
- Aravind Eye Hospitals (India)
- L. V. Prasad Eye Institute (India)
- Massachusetts Eye and Ear (United States)
- Moorfields Eye Hospital (England)
- New York Eye and Ear Infirmary (United States)
- Prima Saigon Medical Center (Vietnam)
- Royal Victorian Eye and Ear Hospital (Australia)
- Singapore National Eye Centre (Singapore)
- Wills Eye Hospital (United States)
- Wilmer Ophthalmological Institute (United States)
