= Ho Chi Minh City Open University =

University in Ho Chi Minh City, Vietnam

Coordinates: 10.7764°N 106.6902°E

- Đại học Mở Thành phố Hồ Chí Minh
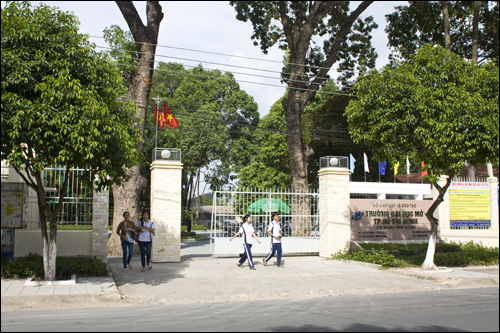
- Motto: Together we will plan the future
- Type: Public university
- Established: 1990
- Rector: Nguyễn Minh Hà
- Location: 35-37 Ho Hao Hon Street, District 1, Ho Chi Minh City, Vietnam
- Website: http://www.ou.edu.vn/

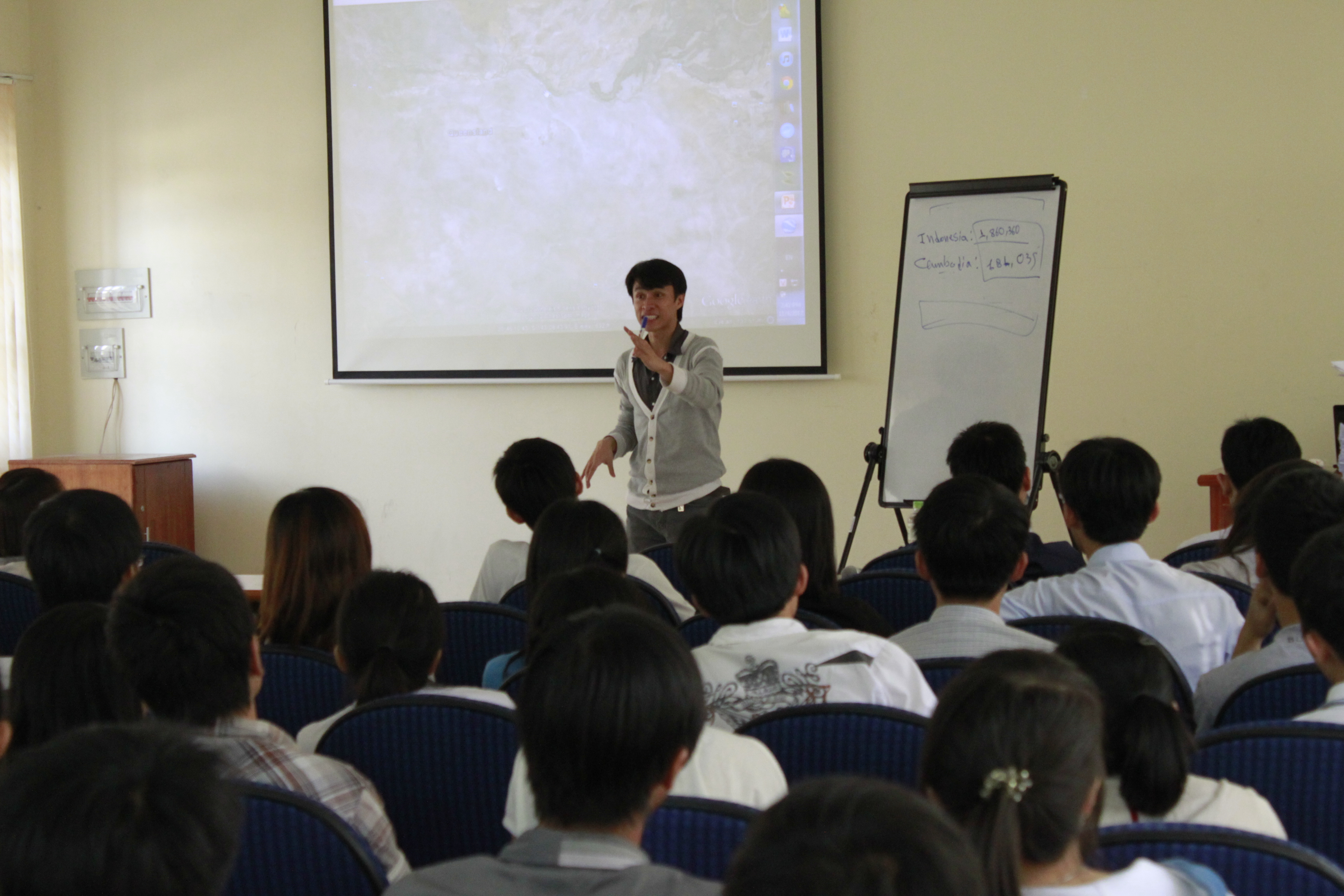
The auditorium of the Open University campus: 97 Vo Van Tan, District 3, Ho Chi Minh City

Ho Chi Minh City Open University (Vietnamese: Đại học Mở Thành phố Hồ Chí Minh) is a public university located in District 3, Ho Chi Minh City, Vietnam. This is the first open university in Vietnam. The university was initially Ho Chi Minh City Open and Semi-Private University established on June 15, 1990, obtaining the present name on June 26, 2006.

HCMCOU is a higher education institution offering a variety of programs ranging from on-site to distance learning and learning at satellite academic centers, it aims to meet various learning needs of society and to contribute to the enriching of the country's human resources.

There are currently more than 60,000 students enrolling in daytime, nighttime, and distance-learning courses at HCMCOU. The university has, thus far, granted approximately 40,000 bachelor's degrees and more than 1,500 master's degrees.

In 2020, female students comprised more than 70% of the student body at Ho Chi Minh City Open University.

== Faculties ==
- Faculty of Business Administration
- Faculty of Economics & Law
- Faculty of Finance – Banking
- Faculty of Accounting – Auditing
- Faculty of Biotechnology
- Faculty of Civil & Electrical Engineering
- Faculty of Computer Science
- Faculty of Foreign Languages
- Faculty of Sociology – Social Work – Southeast Asian Studies
- School of Advanced Study

== Education investments ==
Each year the Open University of Ho Chi Minh spends an average of 10% to 15% of funds to equip laboratories and on library investment. The current system of university laboratories meets the requirements of the experimental practice of students training program.

The university has also focused on the work of serving students. The library holds more than 500 seats, with computer intranet and internet to help students research. The library now has a web-based management software and an automated system to borrow and return books. The library holds 40,000 copies (in English and Vietnamese) of reference books, journals and dissertations of undergraduate and graduate students.

== International cooperation ==
- The university is maintaining and developing partnerships and information exchanges with other organizations and universities to seek foreign collaboration capabilities that link the university training, postgraduate, short courses and vocational training.
- Vietnam Belgium Master Program, Université Libre de cooperation with Brussels, Belgium. Conducted from 1995 to now, MBA training. Since 2001, open training MSc Management and Economics from the State in 2004 to open more training programs Master of Business Administration - Information Systems.
- The cooperation program compiling textbooks, trained social workers, school social studies, social work practice and scholarship support for students of Sociology.
- The program is conducted regularly every year since 1993, is assessed annually and create credibility for the scientific study on women with other international organizations Raddda Barnen (Sweden), Ford Foundation, World Vision International, Church World Service (United States), University of Oxford (United Kingdom).
- Recommended Programs Teachers Volunteer Organization Youth Educational Services (U.S.) conducted continuously since 1994. Teachers are teaching enthusiastic reviews, good. The volunteer teachers are then engaged to teach the other Faculty.
- Student Exchange Program with Kyungnam University (Korea). Cooperative program between the two schools was carried out on many areas such as student exchanges, support teacher training and exchange of lecturers.
- Schools also received much help from the Japanese non-governmental organizations to help prevent audio-visual equipment, helping British Council learning materials ... universities in the world has as much support for enhanced Capilano College training programs under the credit system, construction of distance education programs, help train teachers write curriculum for distance learning.
- The international conference program and invited foreign lecturers for the training of school teachers.
- The university officials to participate in study abroad such as Canada, Thailand, the US and the UK. Many faculty members from foreign universities through the visiting teaching and research at the University.
- E-learning program of cooperation with United Kingdom.
