= University of Architecture Ho Chi Minh City =

University in Vietnam

Coordinates: 10°46′55.50″N 106°41′38.98″E

- Đại học Kiến trúc Thành phố Hồ Chí Minh
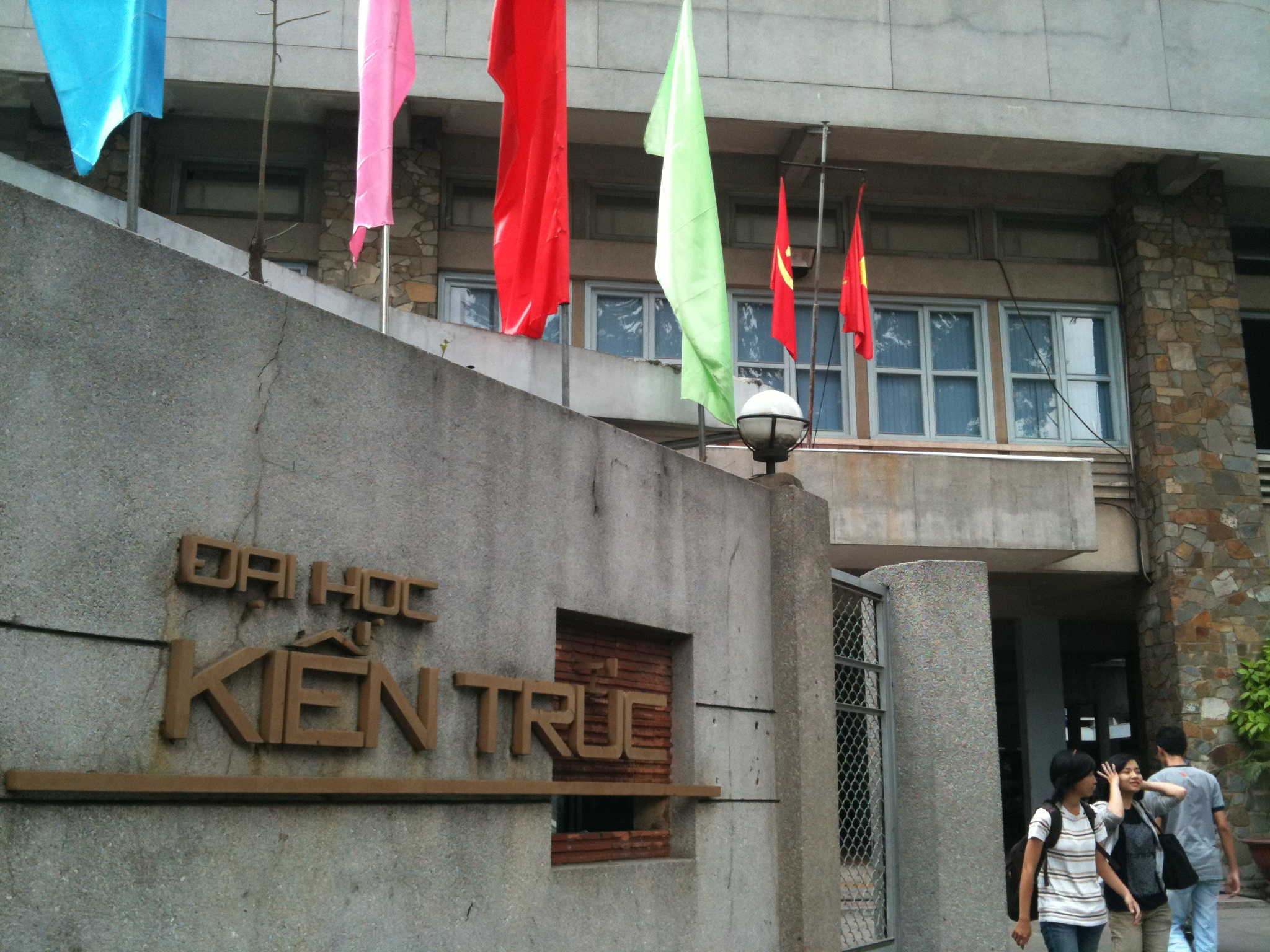
- Former names: Đại học Kiến trúc Sài Gòn, UAH, HCMUArc
- Type: Public
- Established: 1976; 50 years ago
- Rector: Dr. Lê Văn Thương
- Location: 196 Pasteur & 59D Nguyễn Đình Chiểu Street, Xuân Hòa, District 3, Ho Chi Minh City, Vietnam
- Campus: Urban
- Website: HCMUArc website

University of Architecture Ho Chi Minh City (Vietnamese: Đại học Kiến trúc Thành phố Hồ Chí Minh, officially abbreviated as UAH) is a specialized university and a pioneer in training and research within the fields of architecture, construction, and applied arts in Vietnam. It operates under the management of the Ministry of Construction. Its main campus is located in District 3, Ho Chi Minh City in addition to two branch campuses in Da Lat, Lâm Đồng province and Cần Thơ.

Beyond its primary mission of education, the university serves as a center for scientific research, consultation, and the implementation of key projects for both the government and private enterprises. Its team of experts and faculty members has participated in the realization of notable projects such as the Golden Bridge (Da Nang), Nguyen Hue Flower Street, and the Dong Nai Newspaper and Television station.

The University's predecessor was the Department of Architecture at the Indochina College of Fine Arts, established in Hanoi in 1926 based on the French educational model. After multiple stages of development and relocation, the school was re-established in 1976 under its current name, becoming a key educational institution for the construction and design sectors in Vietnam.

== History ==
- 1924 - L'ecole des Beaux Arts de L'Indochichine (Indochina Art School) Vietnamese language: Trường Mỹ thuật Đông Dương was founded in Hanoi
- 1926 - Department of Architecture was first opened in the Ecole des Beaux Art
- 1944 - The school was relocated to Da Lat and renamed as Architectural School of Da Lat French Language: l'École supérieure d'architecture de Dalat
- 1948 - The Architecture School of Da Lat was merged into the Indochina University Université Indochinoise and renamed as College of Architecture
- 1950 - The school was relocated to Saigon and separated from L’École des Beaux-Arts de Paris
- 1976 - The school received its current name, University of Architecture of Ho Chi Minh City

== Facilities ==
Ho Chi Minh City University of Architecture is located at the center of town. It has classical architecture from 1972.

- Classrooms fully equipped with computers, projectors and wifi.
- Information Technology classrooms with individual desktops for each student.
- A library with all the books the students need for their studies.
- A Self-studying and social area for students to relax in their free time.

== Main campus at 196 Pasteur ==
The main campus of Ho Chi Minh City University of Architecture was built in 1972 and is still in use today. The design was originally a final year project of Trương Văn Long, at that time, a student under supervision of Professor Phạm Văn Thâng.

== External collaborations ==
Collaborative programs the university is involved include:

- Sandwich courses in industrial design and civil engineering with Australian Swinburne University of Technology
- Sandwich post graduate course in urban planning with Asian Institute of Technology
- Advanced urban design course, in collaboration with Katholieke Universiteit Leuven
