= Tân Sơn Nhất =

Tân Sơn Nhất Phường Tân Sơn Nhất Tân Sơn Nhứt
- Ward
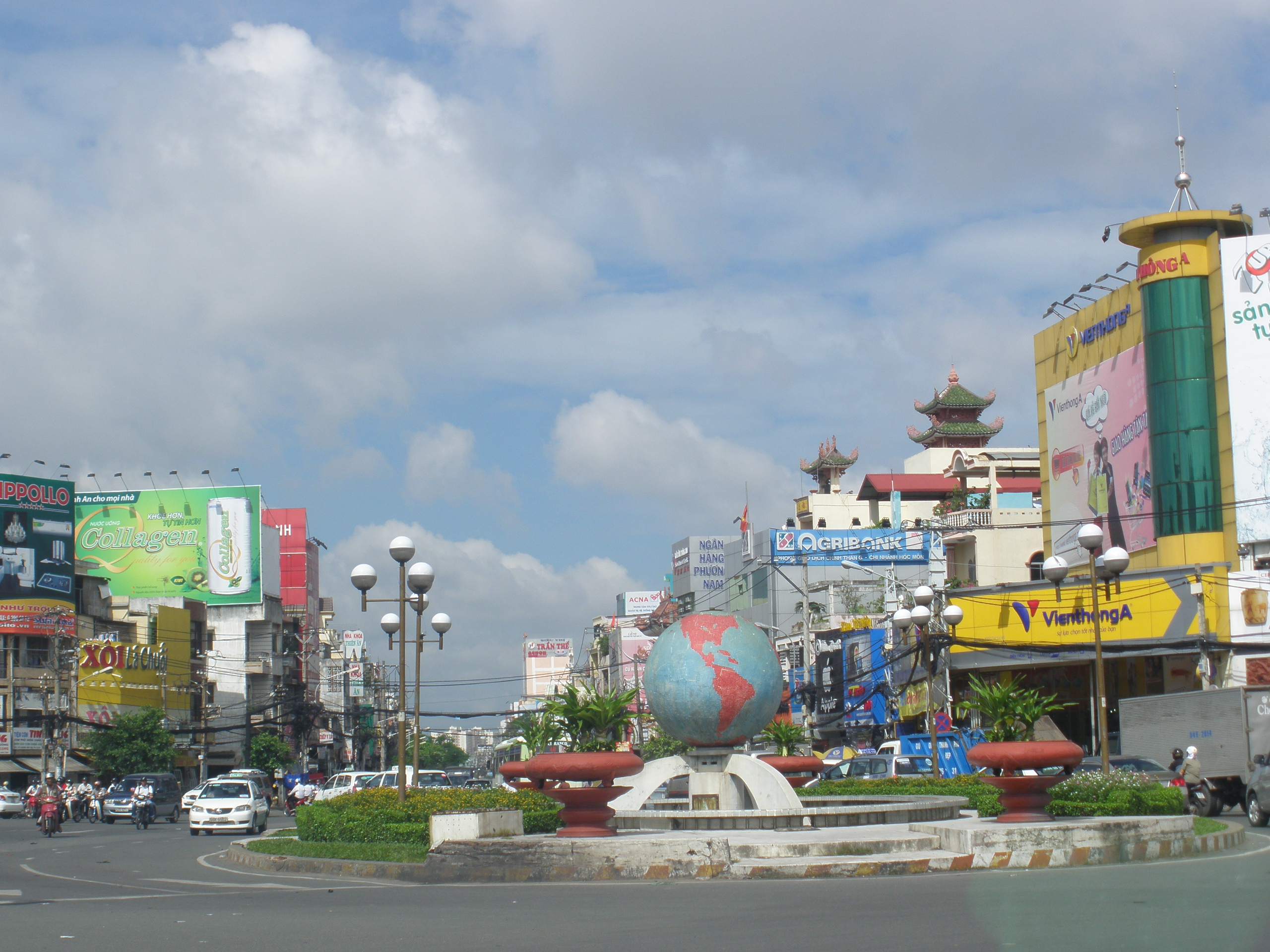
- Lăng Cha Cả intersection
- Interactive map of Tân Sơn Nhất
- Coordinates: 10°47′37″N 106°39′23″E
- Country: Vietnam
- Municipality: Ho Chi Minh City
- Established: June 16, 2025

Area
  - Total: 1.23 sq mi (3.19 km^{2})

Population (2024)
  - Total: 84,639
  - Density: 68,700/sq mi (26,500/km^{2})
- Time zone: UTC+07:00 (Indochina Time)
- Administrative code: 26968

Tân Sơn Nhất (Vietnamese: Phường Tân Sơn Nhất) is a ward of Ho Chi Minh City, Vietnam. It is one of the 168 new wards, communes and special zones of the city following the reorganization in 2025.

== Geography ==
Tân Sơn Nhất ward located in the urban core of Ho Chi Minh City, 6 km to the Northwest of Saigon, it is adjacent to:

- Tân Sơn Hòa to the Northeast mainly by routes of Trường Sơn – Trần Quốc Hoàn – Hoàng Văn Thụ and Nhiêu Lộc – Thị Nghè Channel
- Tân Sơn to the North
- Tân Hòa to the South by routes of Lý Thường Kiệt – Trần Triệu Luật – Bến Cát – Nghĩa Phát
- Phú Nhuận and Nhiêu Lộc to the East by Nhieu Loc–Thi Nghe Channel and Alley 686 Cách Mạng Tháng Tám
- Bảy Hiền to the West by streets of Trường Chinh – Xuân Hồng – Xuân Diệu – Nguyễn Thái Bình and Alley 18A Cộng Hòa.

According to Official Dispatch No. 2896/BNV-CQĐP dated May 27, 2025 of the Ministry of Home Affairs, following the merger, Tân Sơn Nhất has a land area of 3.19 km², the population as of December 31, 2024 is 84,639 people, the population density is 26,532 people/km².

== History ==
On June 16, 2025, the National Assembly Standing Committee issued Resolution No. 1685/NQ-UBTVQH15 on the arrangement of commune-level administrative units of Ho Chi Minh City in 2025 (effective from June 16, 2025). Accordingly, the entire land area and population of Ward 4, Ward 5 and Ward 7 of the former Tân Bình district will be integrated into a new ward named Tân Sơn Nhất (Clause 57, Article 1).

The name Tân Sơn Nhất or previously Tân Sơn Nhứt is came from an old village initially known as Tân Sơn, it was split into two and named as Tân Sơn Nhứt (the first), and Tân Sơn Nhì (the second, in former Tân Phú district, Ho Chi Minh City), on a high hill that is generally known as Gò Vấp. The Tân Sơn Nhứt village was mostly occupied to build the Tan Son Nhut Air Base then Tan Son Nhat International Airport in the French Indochina period, first 1900s. After the occupation, the Tân Sơn Nhứt village remain area was so small, it was merged into the adjacent village Chí Hòa to be Tân Sơn Hòa.

== Gallery ==
=== Notable attractions ===
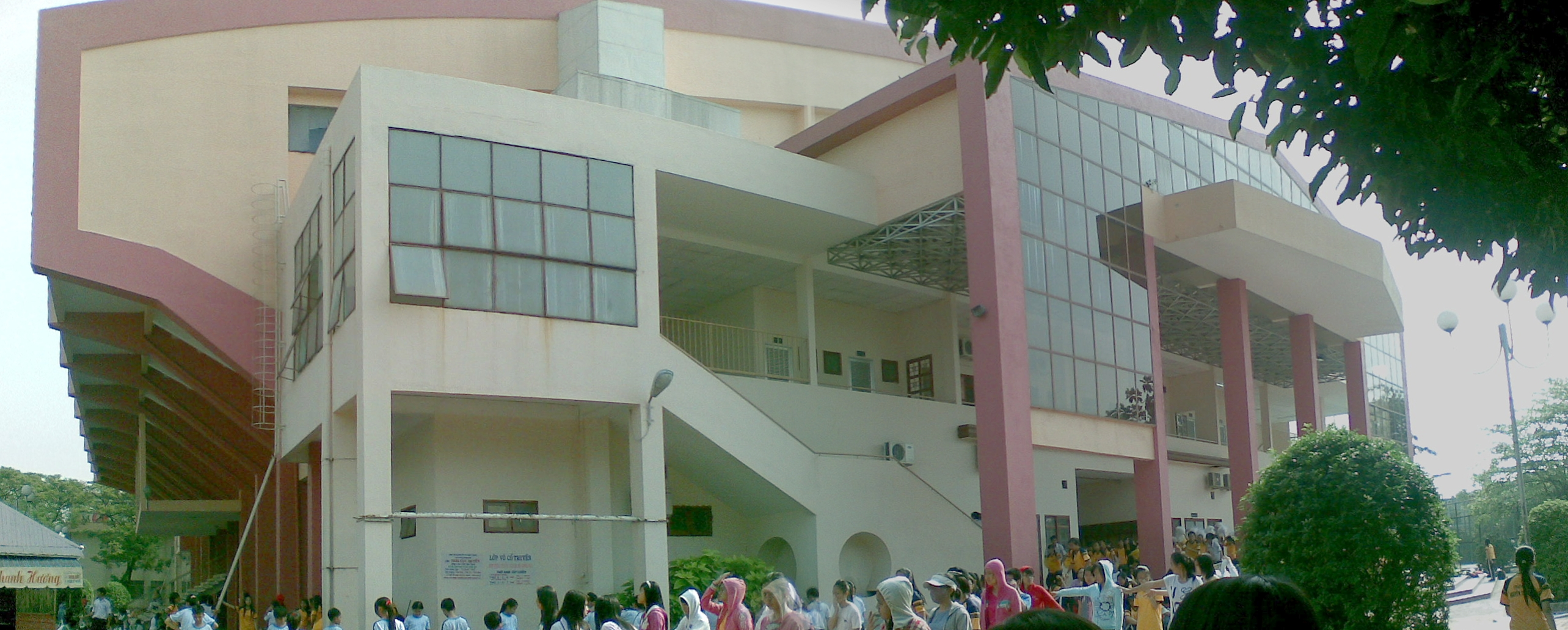
Tân Bình Gymnasium

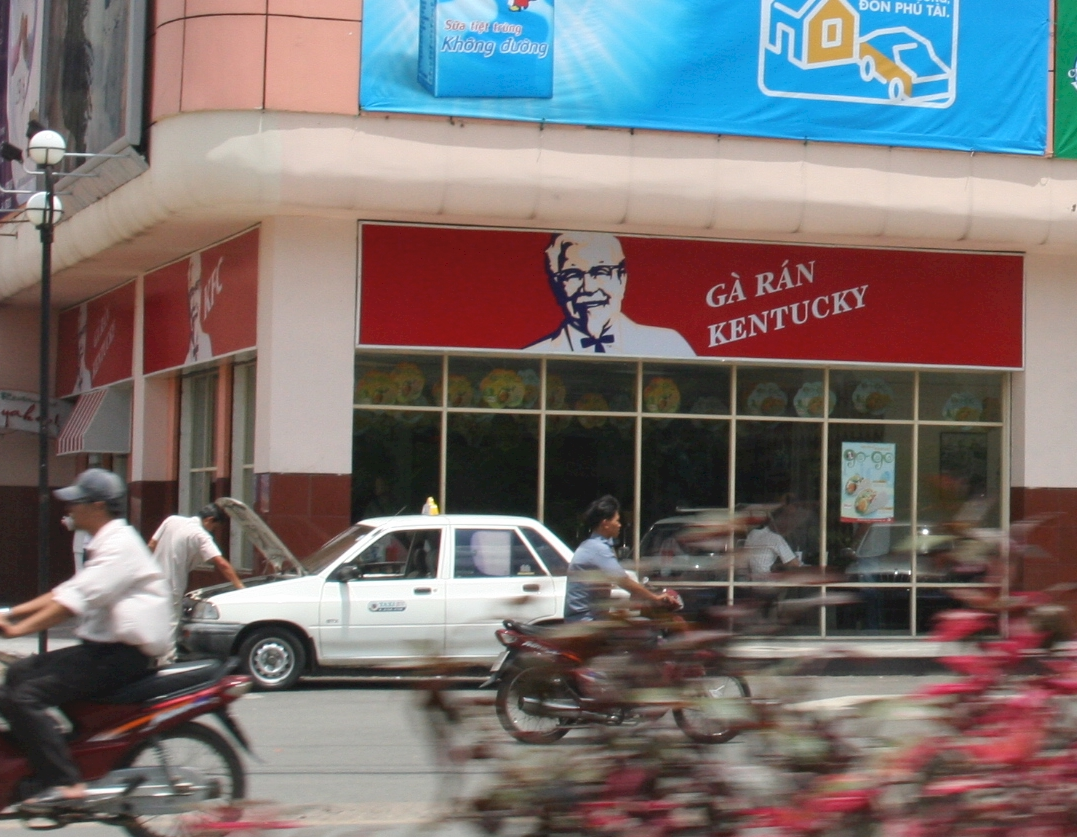
Vincom Plaza Cộng Hòa

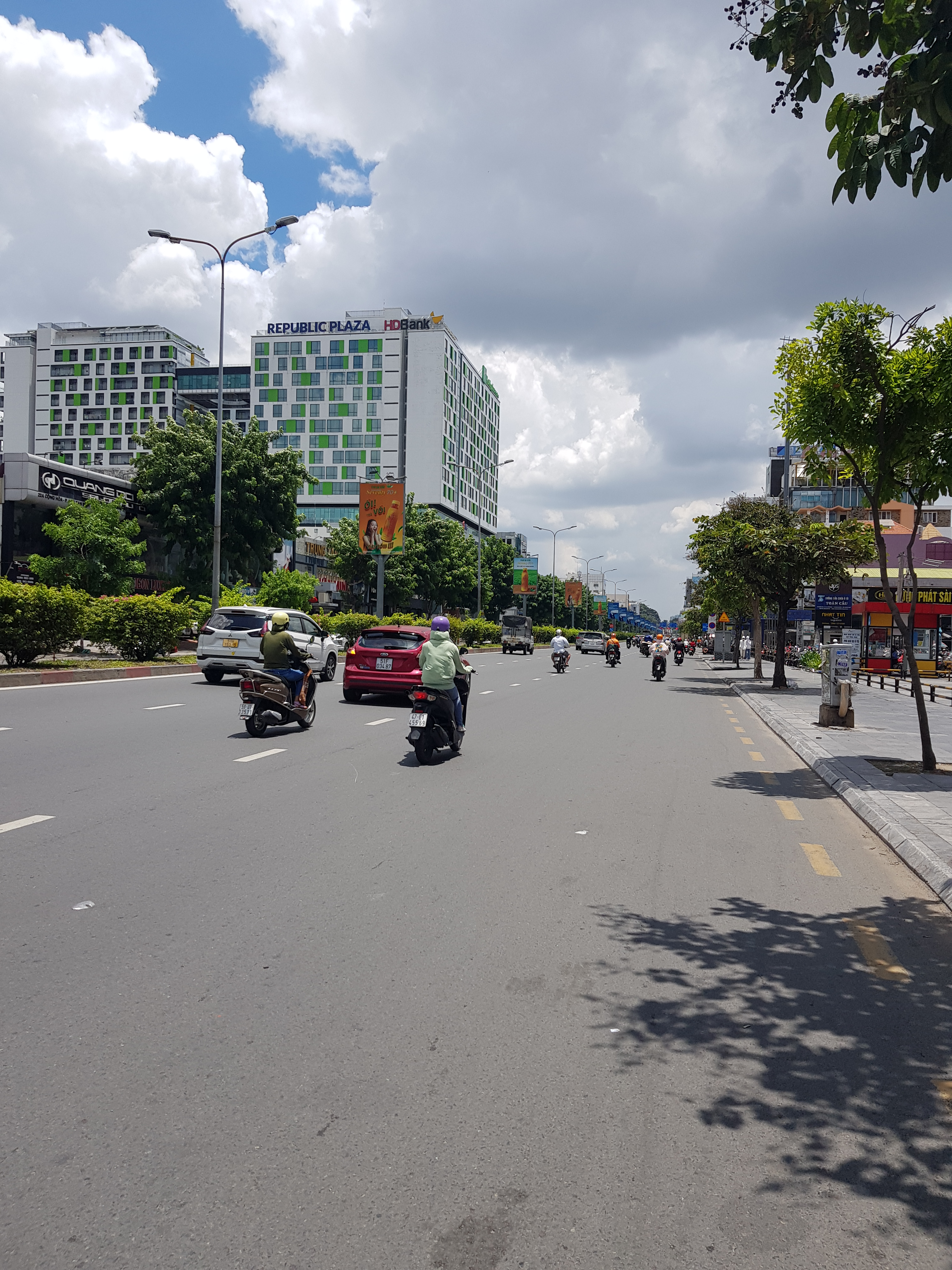
Republic Plaza Building featuring Holiday Inn & Suites Saigon Airport on Cộng Hòa Street

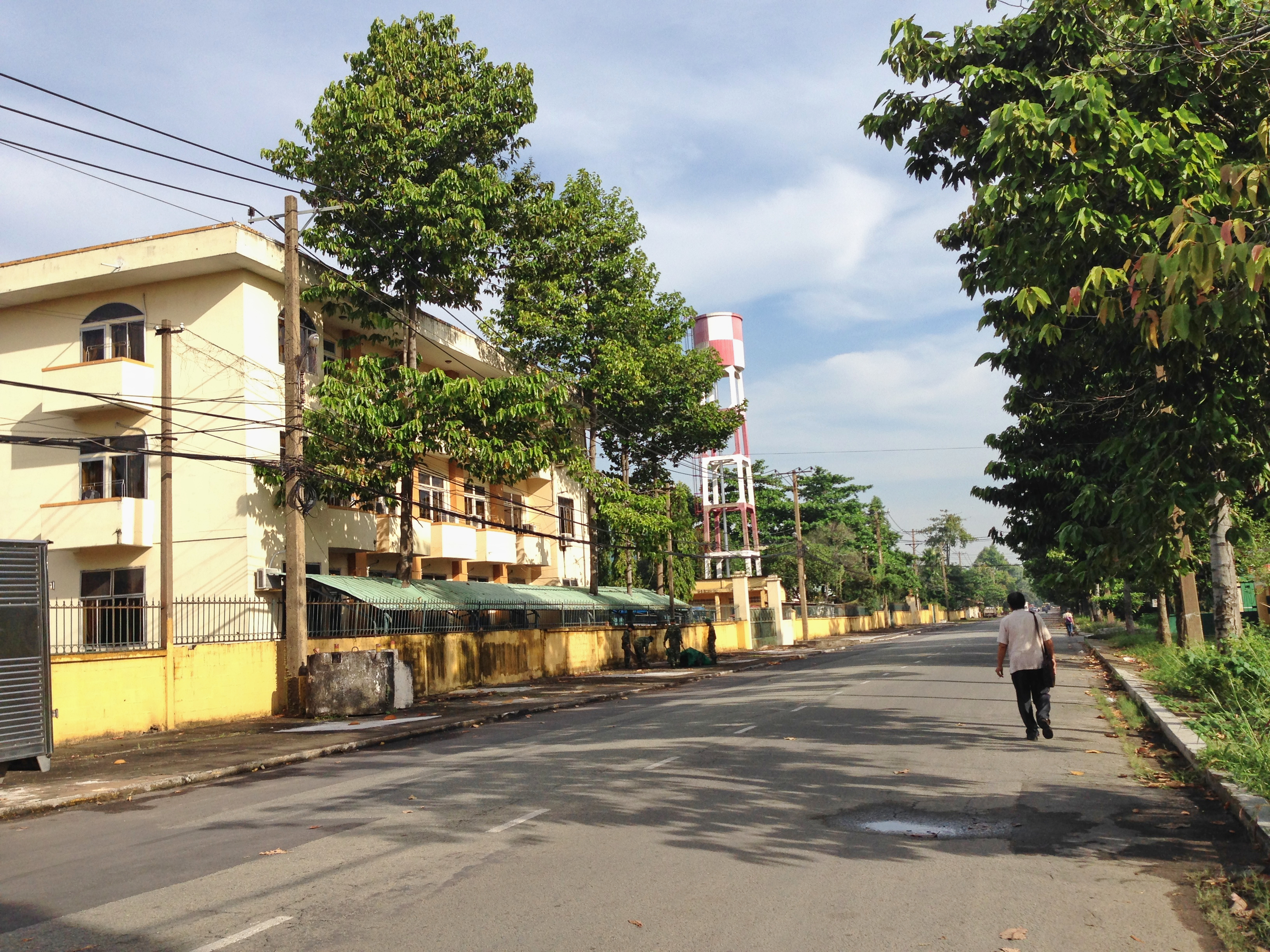
Department of Logistics - General Staff of the Vietnam People's Army – Southern Representative Agency (near the Davis Station)

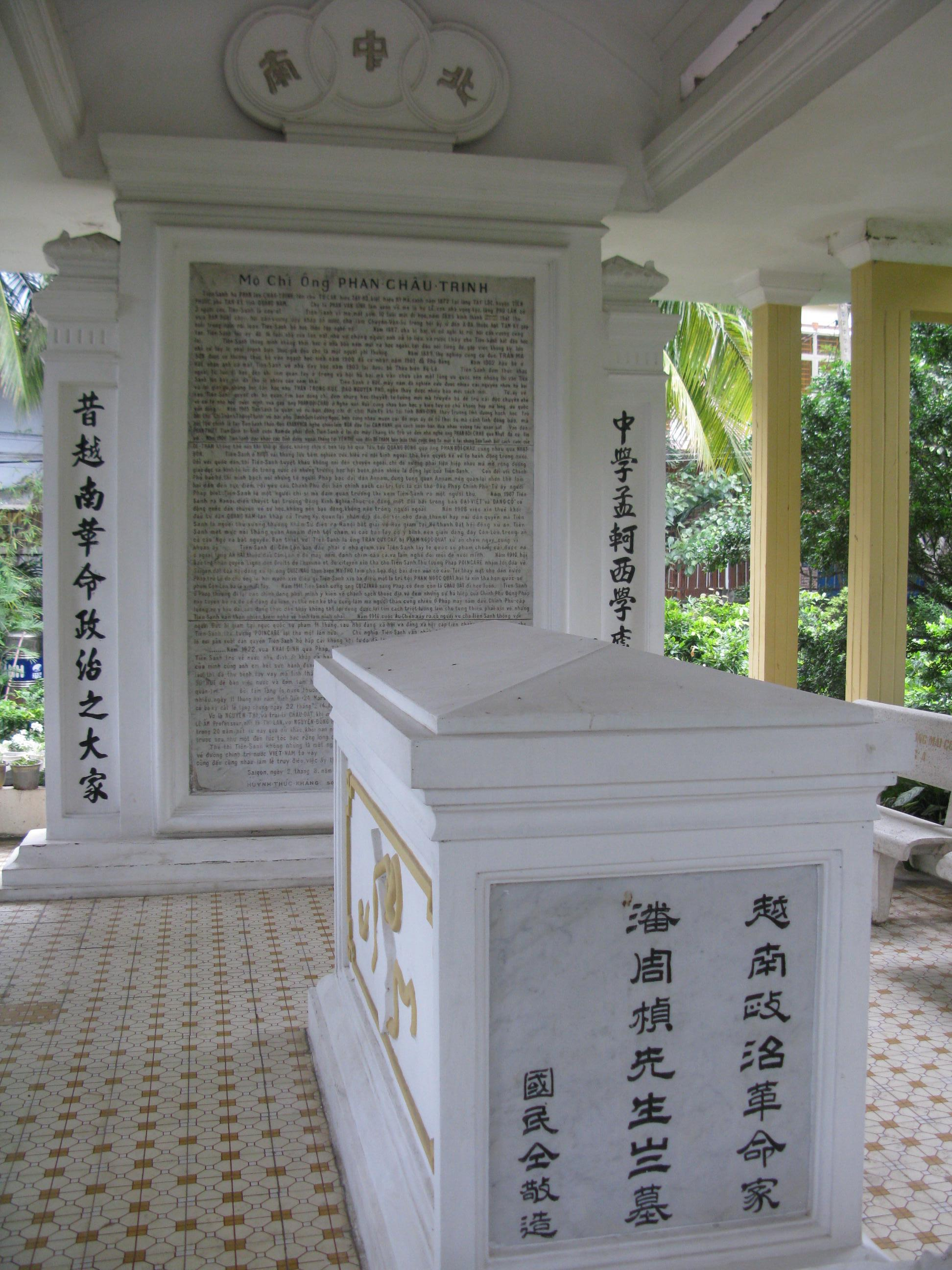
Mausoleum of Phan Châu Trinh in his mansion on Phan Thúc Duyện Street

=== Street scenes ===
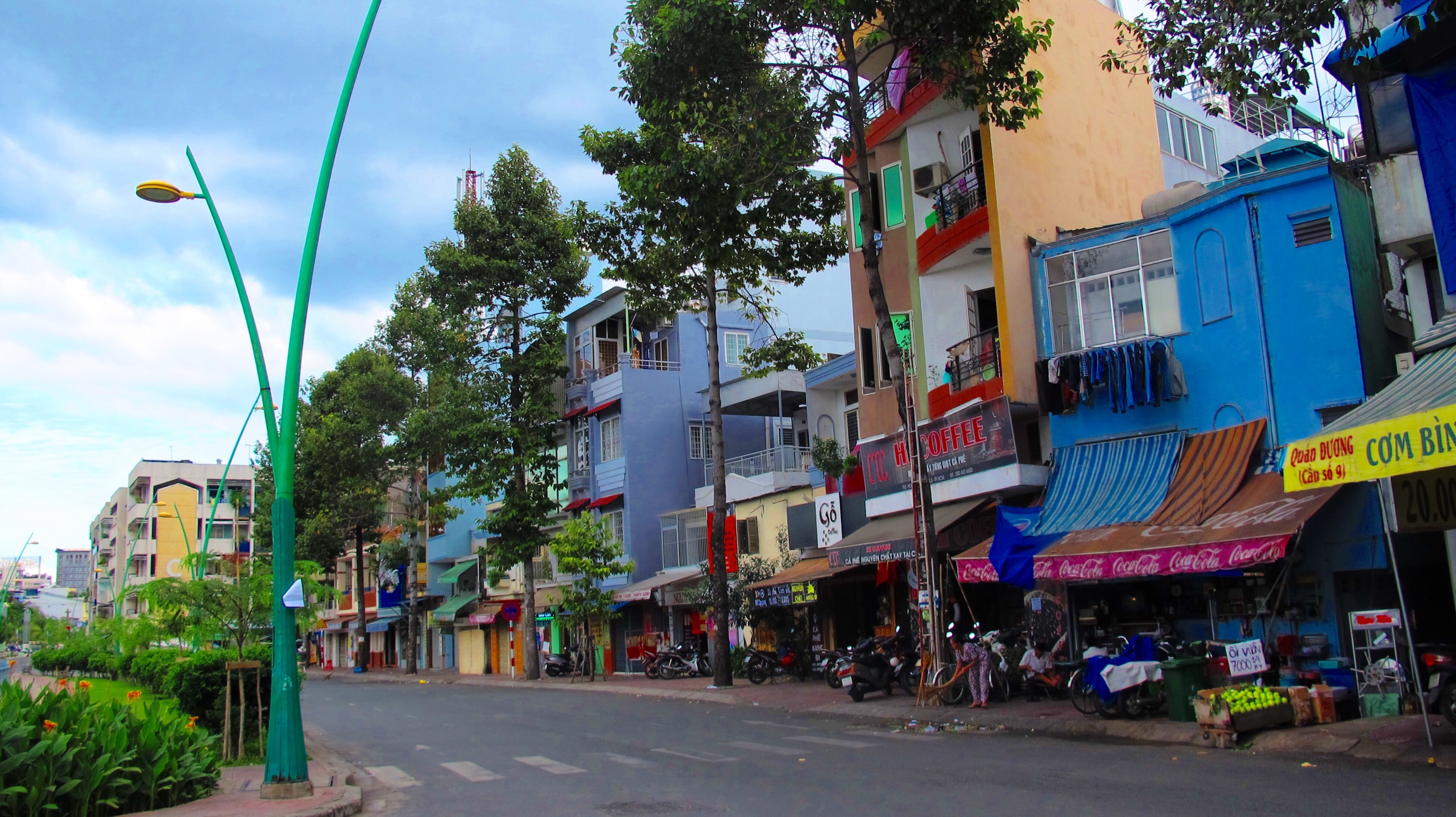
Hoàng Sa Canalside Road

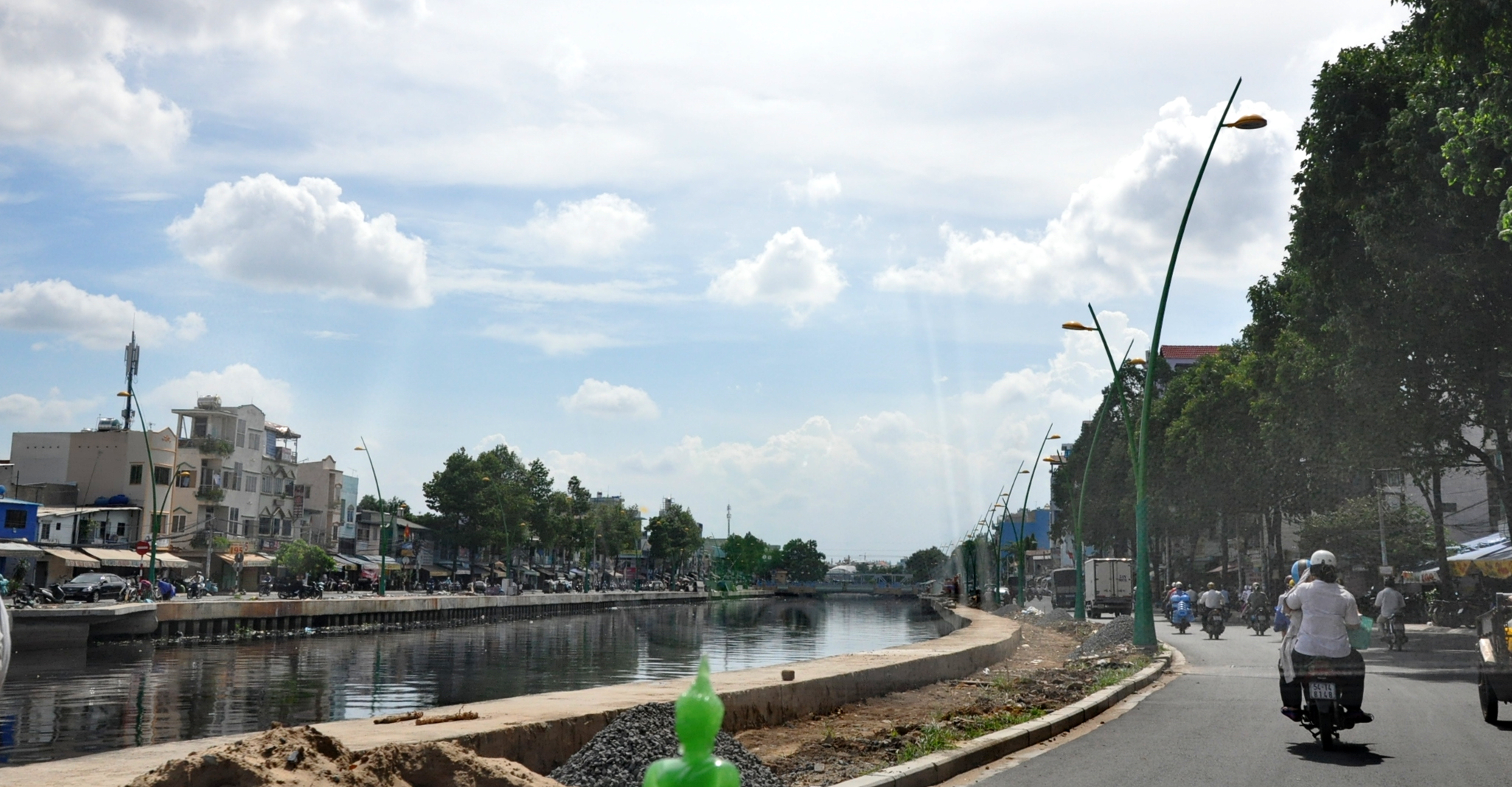
Nhieu Loc–Thi Nghe Channel

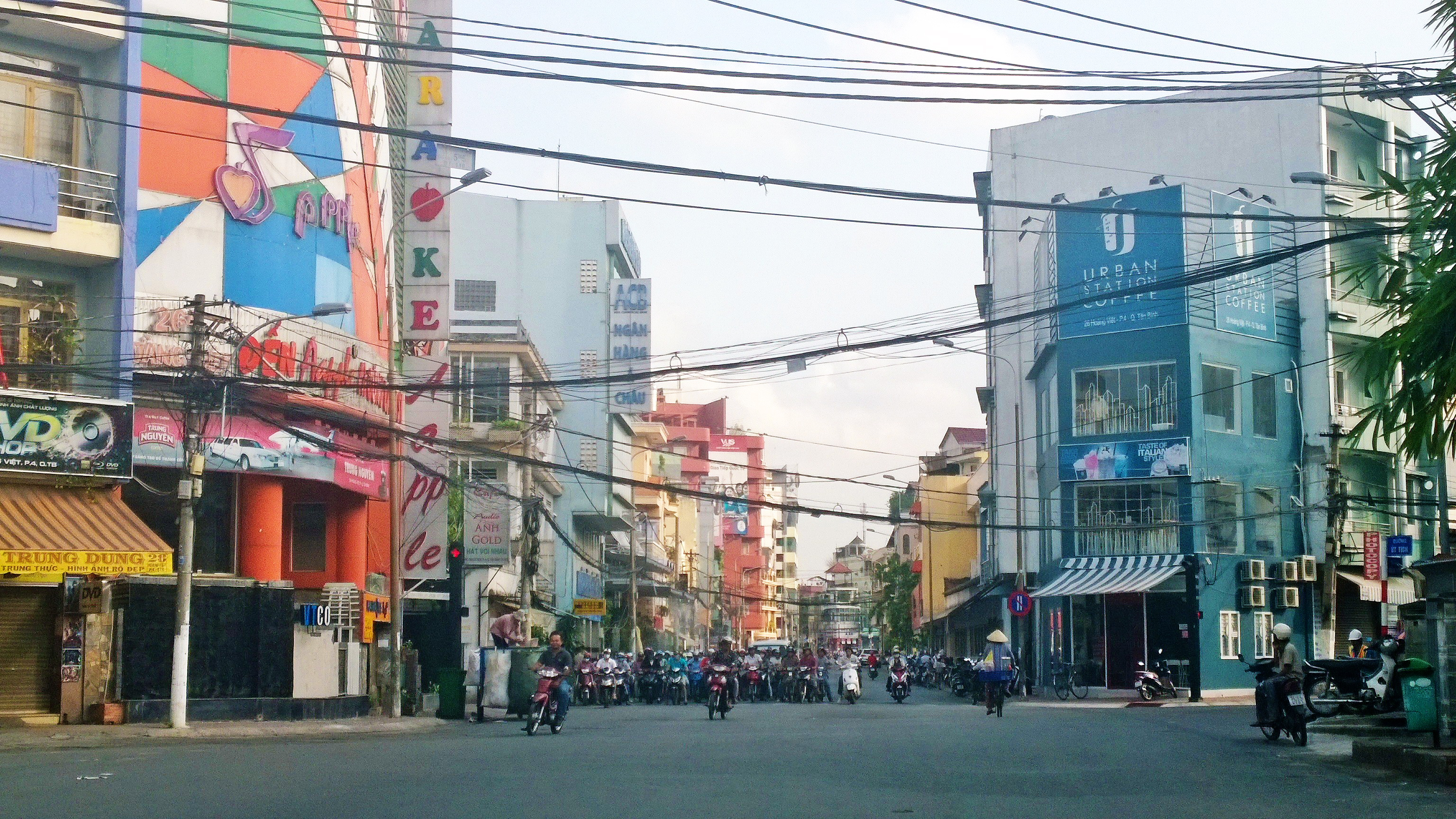
Intersection of Hoàng Việt and Út Tịch Street, the latter street was the distributary of Nhieu Loc–Thi Nghe Channel

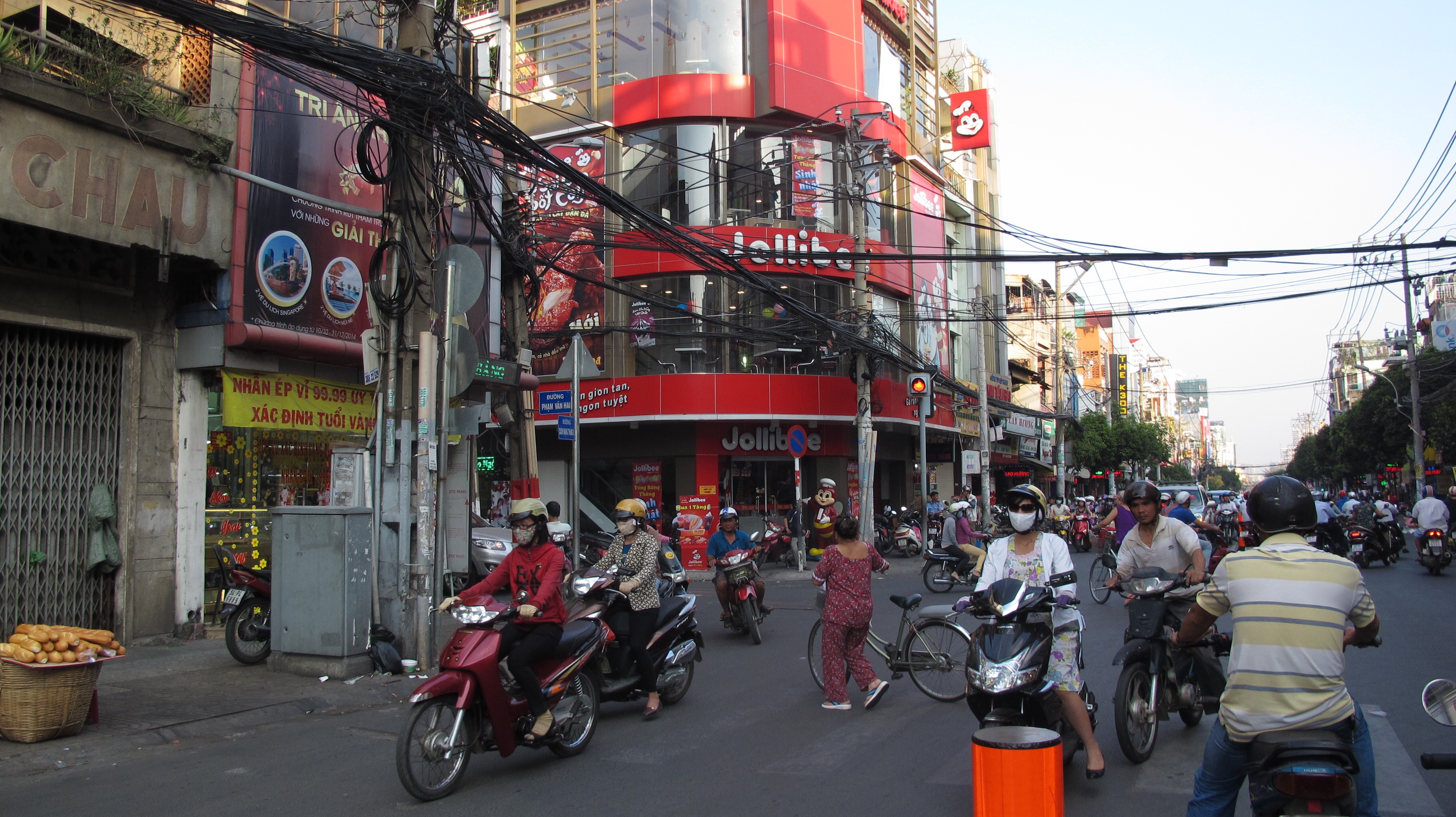
Ông Tạ T-junction (Phạm Văn Hai and Cách Mạng Tháng Tám Street), also where Phạm Văn Hai station located

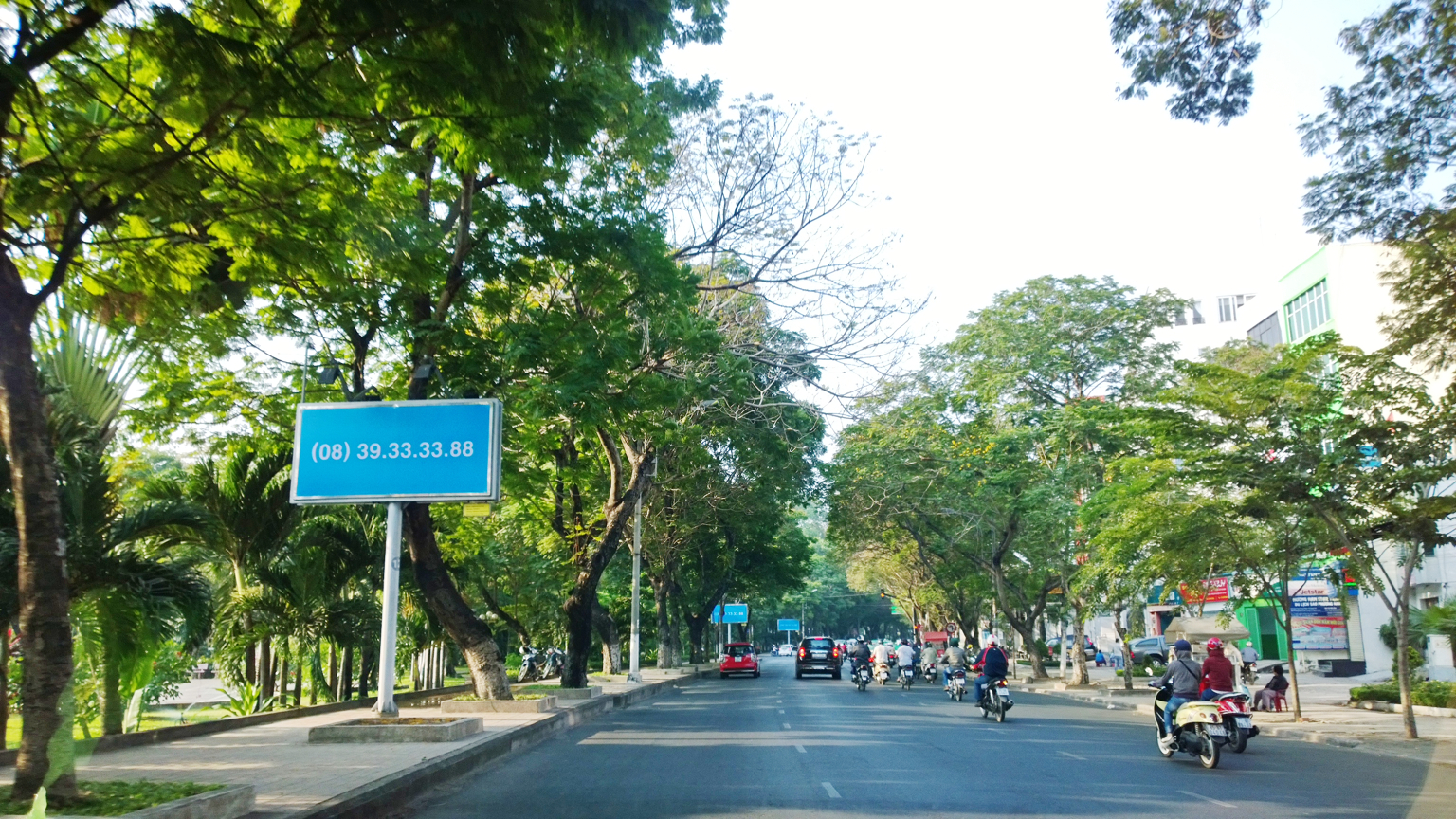
Trần Quốc Hoàn Street next to Hoàng Văn Thụ Park, dividing wards of Tân Sơn Nhất and Tân Sơn Hòa

== Healthcare ==
Name	Address	Type	Government	Website	Note
Thống Nhất Hospital	No. 1 Lý Thuờng Kiệt	General	Ministry of Health		Formerly known as Vì Dân Hospital
1A Hospital	540-542 (or 1A) Lý Thường Kiệt	Specialized	Ministry of Health		Also known as Ho Chi Minh City Orthopedics and Rehabilitation Hospital
Tân Bình General Hospital	605 Hoàng Văn Thụ	General	Ho Chi Minh City Department of Health		

== Education ==
=== Academies and College ===
Name	Address	Note
Vietnam Aviation Academy	18A/1 Cộng Hòa	Campus 2
Vietnam Academy of Cryptography Techniques – Ho Chi Minh City Branch	17A Cộng Hòa	
Lý Tự Trọng Technical College	390 Hoàng Văn Thụ	

=== Secondary and High School ===
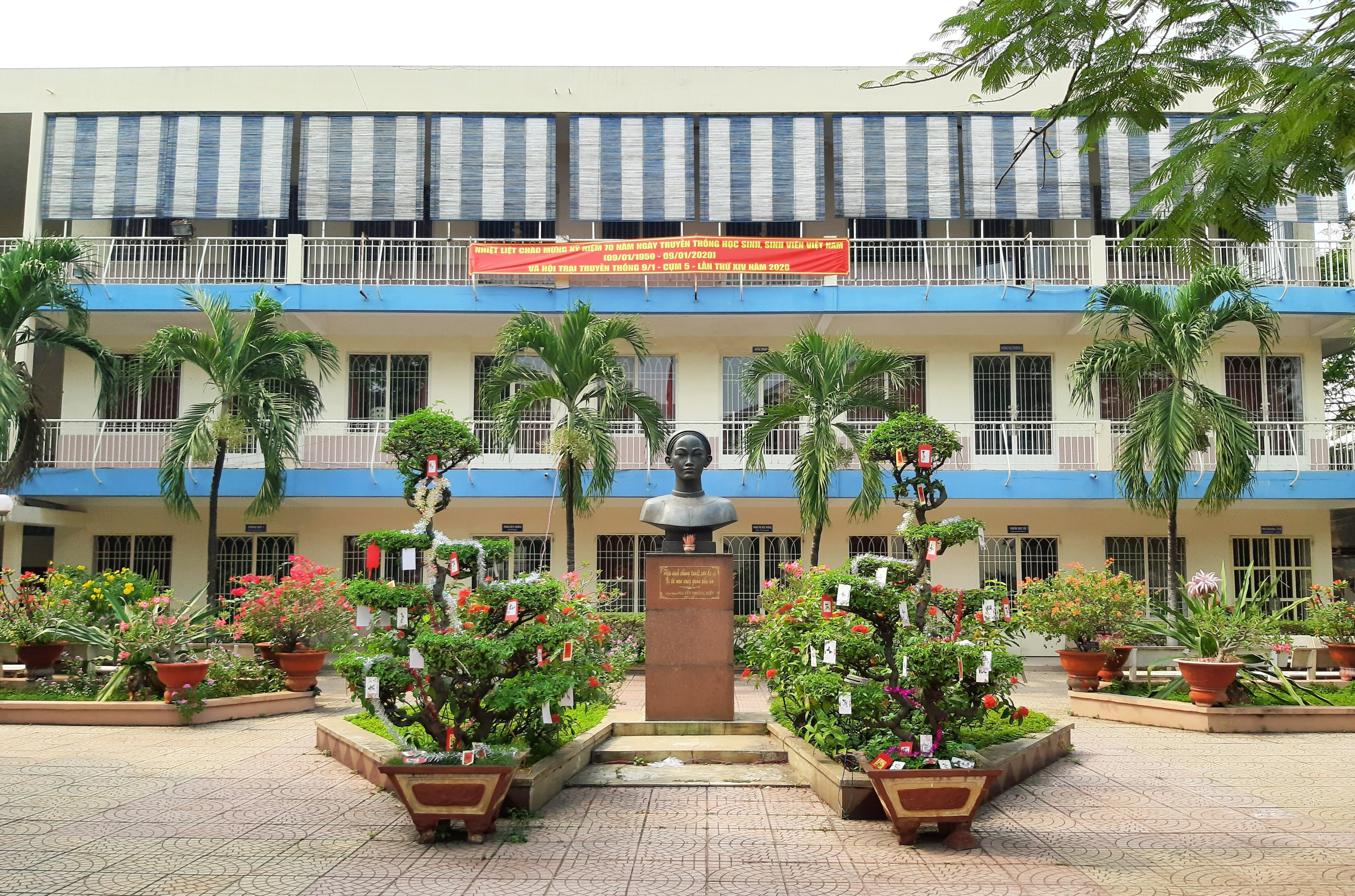
Nguyễn Thượng Hiền High School office building and the statue of Nguyễn Thượng Hiền

Name	Address	Note
Nguyễn Thượng Hiền High School	544 Cách Mạng Tháng Tám	Gate 1
Nguyễn Thượng Hiền High School	649 Hoàng Văn Thụ	Gate 2
Nguyễn Thượng Hiền High School	2 Lê Bình	Gate 3
Âu Lạc Secondary School	46 Hoàng Việt	
Tân Bình Secondary School	873 Cách Mạng Tháng Tám	
