= Giác Lâm Temple =

Buddhist temple in Ho Chi Minh City, Vietnam

- Chùa Giác Lâm
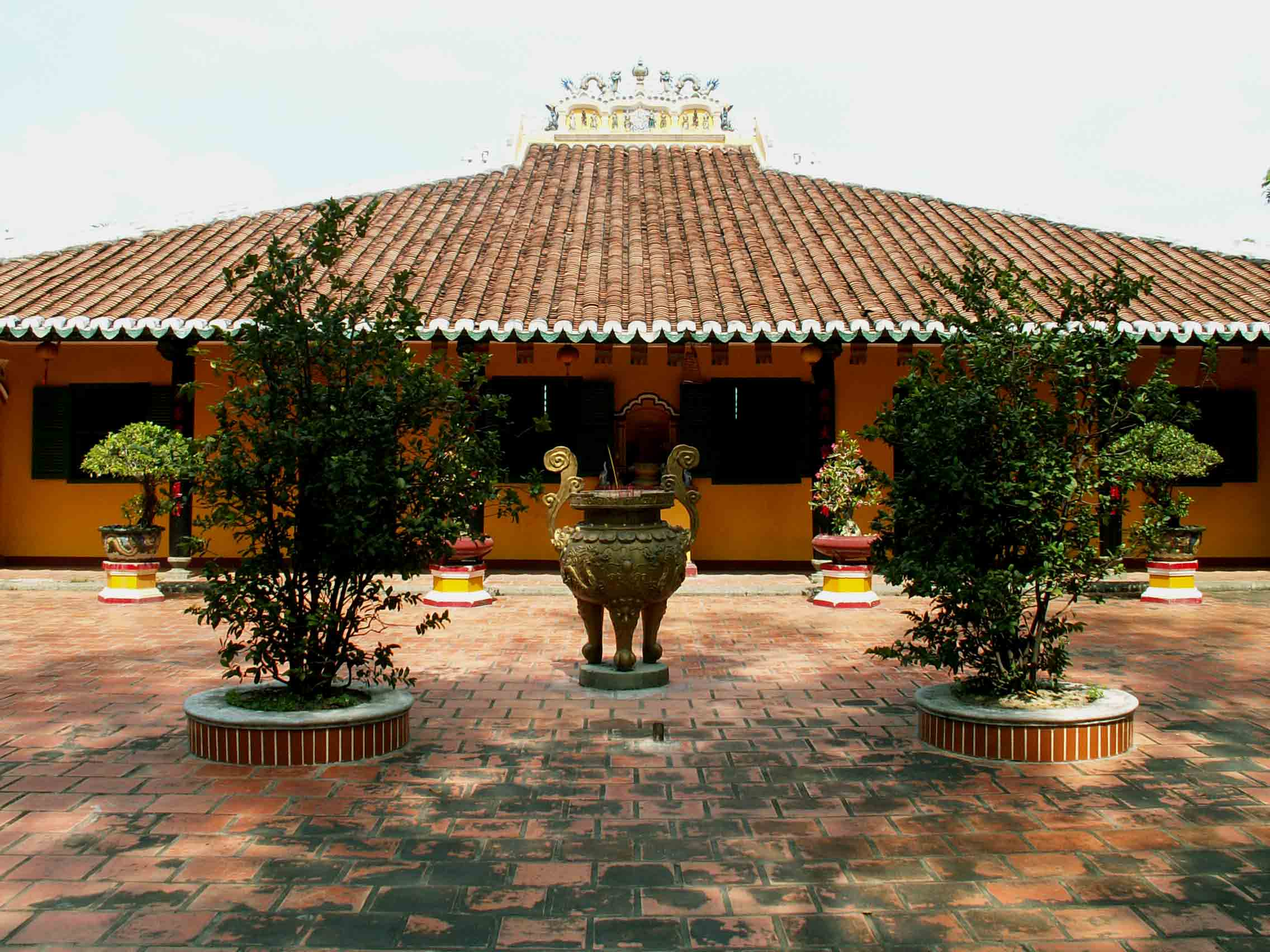
- Photo of Giác Lâm Temple

- Location in Vietnam

Religion
- Affiliation: Buddhist
- Province: Ho Chi Minh city
- Deity: Buddha

Location
- Location: Saigon
- Country: Vietnam
- Coordinates: 10°46′46″N 106°38′57″E

Architecture
- Creator: Lý Thụy Long
- Completed: 1744

Giác Lâm Temple (Vietnamese: Chùa Giác Lâm; chữ Hán: 覺林寺, Giác Lâm tự) is a historic Buddhist temple in Ho Chi Minh City (Saigon), the largest city in Vietnam. Built in 1744, it is one of the oldest temples in the city. It was officially listed as a state-cultural and historical site by the Ministry of Culture, Sports and Tourism in Vietnam on November 16, 1988, under Decision 1288VH/QĐ. The temple is located at 565 (previously 118) Lạc Long Quân Street, Bảy Hiền, (previously Ward 10, Tân Bình district), at the Phú Thọ Hòa area of the city (which was originally the commune of Gia Định province, then known as a ward of former Tân Phú district when it founded after separated Tân Bình district in 2003). It stands on Cẩm Sơn, and is also known as Cẩm Đệm and Sơn Can.

== History ==
It was built by Lý Thụy Long, a native of Minh Hương, in the spring of 1744, i.e., during the season of the Vietnamese new year, during the reign of Nguyễn Phúc Khoát of the Nguyễn Lords, then the ruling family of southern Vietnam. The History chronicles of Gia Định, the then name of the settlement that later became Saigon and then Ho Chi Minh City, written by Trịnh Hoài Đức describes the area as being quite undeveloped at the time, with dense foliage resembling a jungle. The area was surrounded by flower gardens. In its formative years, the temple was a gathering place during the Tết new year and the temple was a scenic lookout on a hill overlooking the Gia Định markets.

In 1772, Thích Viên Quang of the Lâm Tế Thiền lineage arrive to become the abbot of the temple. From then on, the temple was known by its current name of Giác Lâm.

The temple has gone through many periods of renovation and reconstruction. The first notable period of renovation took place between 1799 and 1804, when Thích Viên Quang allowed the total reconstruction of the temple. From 1906 until 1909, Thích Hồng Hưng, with the assistance of Thích Như Phòng, organised for a second total renovation and rebuilding of the temple. The history of these renovations is recorded and is on display in the main hall of the temple.

== Site ==
Giác Lâm Temple is built on a spacious plot, which has now been surrounded by the urban sprawl of the city. The pagoda and the grounds are completely surrounded by walls.

=== Garden and bodhi tree ===
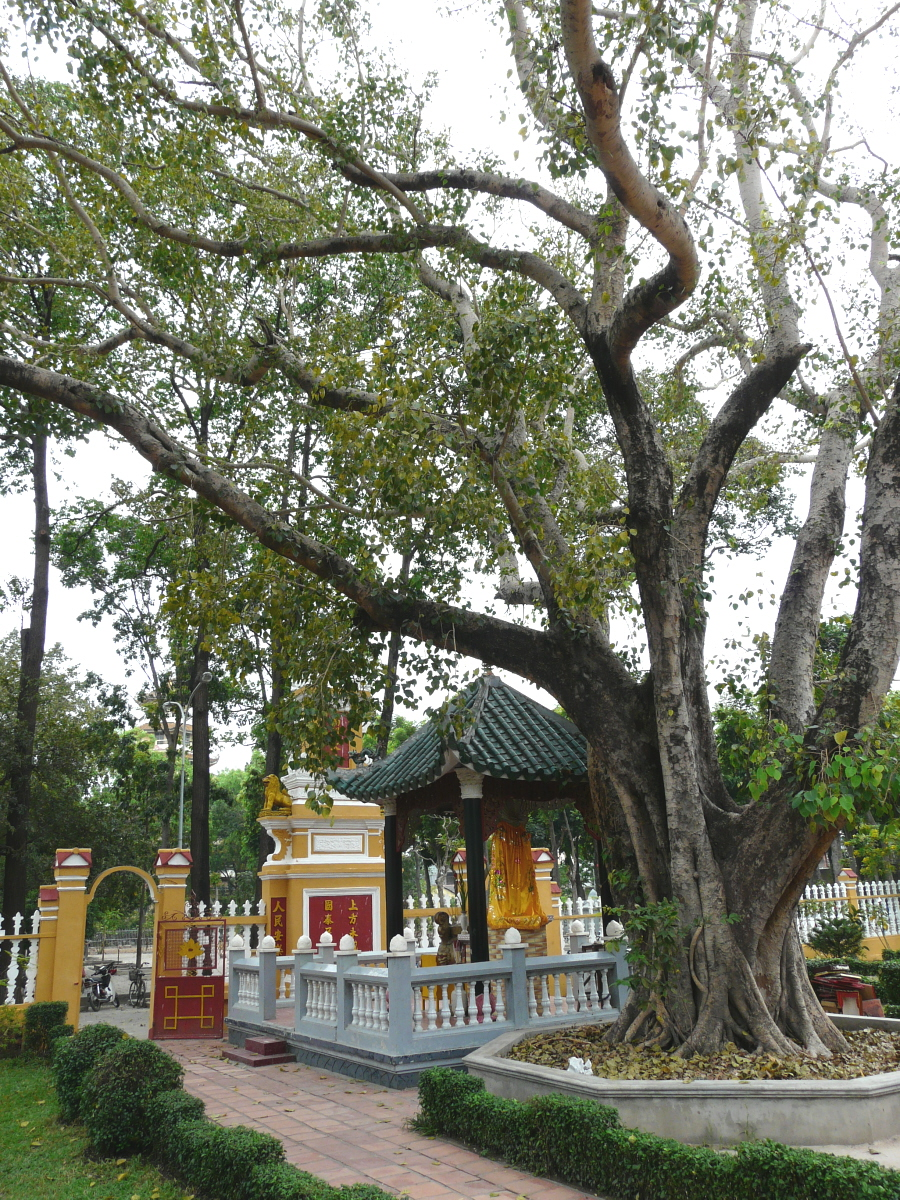
The bodhi tree stands in the garden next to the pagoda.

Immediately upon entering through the main gate is the garden, which is dominated by a large statue of the bodhisattva Avalokiteshvara under a tall and healthy bodhi tree, a species of which Prince Siddhartha sat under while gaining enlightenment to become Gautama Buddha. The tree present in the garden was brought to Vietnam from Sri Lanka by the famous 20th Sinhalese Theravada Buddhist monk Narada, known for his worldwide efforts in propagating the dharma. The tree arrived on June 18, 1953, and was also accompanied by the arrival of a sample of the relics of Gautama Buddha.

=== Seven-stories stupa ===
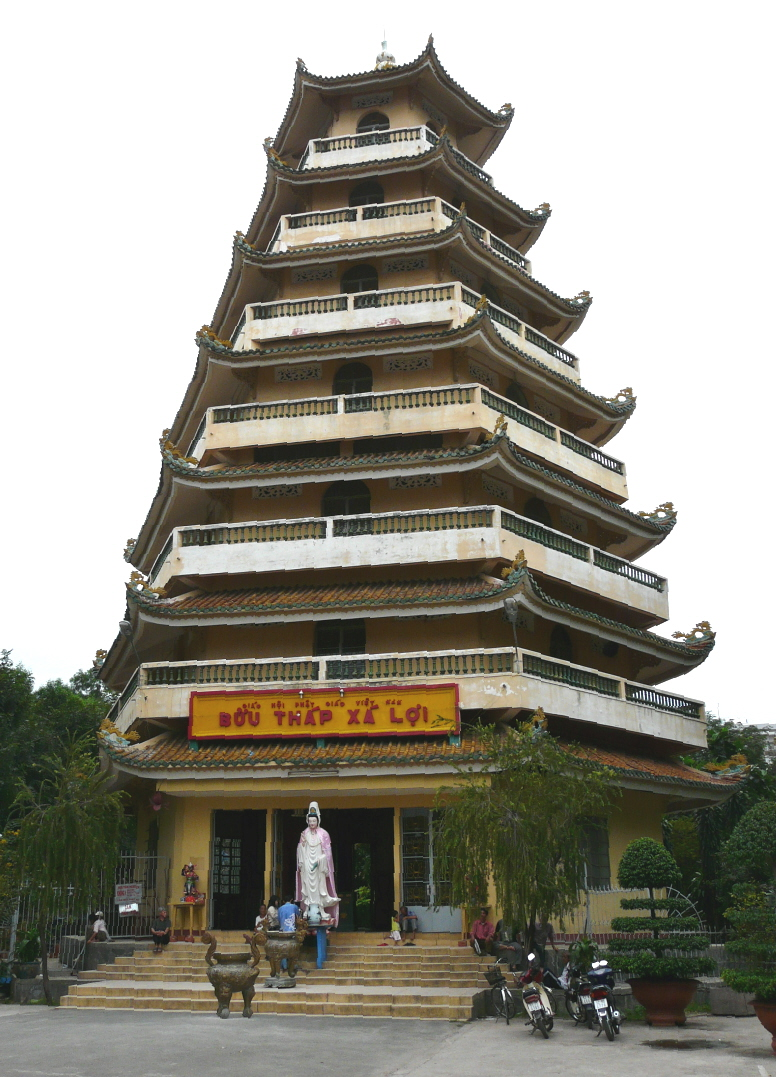
A statue of Quan Am stands at the entrance to the seven-storied stupa.

The stupa is seven storeys high, on hexagonal shape, and each storey comprises tiled roofs and doors. The construction of the stupa began in 1970 under the architectural plans of Vĩnh Hoằng, until construction was temporarily in 1975 following the fall of Saigon to communist North Vietnam and the chaos of the dissolution of South Vietnam. However, construction was put on hold for a long time, and did not resume until 1993.

On June 17, 1994, the Unified Buddhist Congregation of Vietnam staged an opening ceremony for a large stupa that was built for the purpose of the storing the relics of the Buddha. The ceremony was accompanied by the arrival of the Buddha's relics from Long Vân Temple in Bình Thạnh district, where the relics had been stored since their delivery in 1953 by Venerable Narada. The tower stands 32 m and looks eastwards. It currently is one of the tallest Buddhist towers in the city and is a noted landmark of the city.

=== Pagoda ===
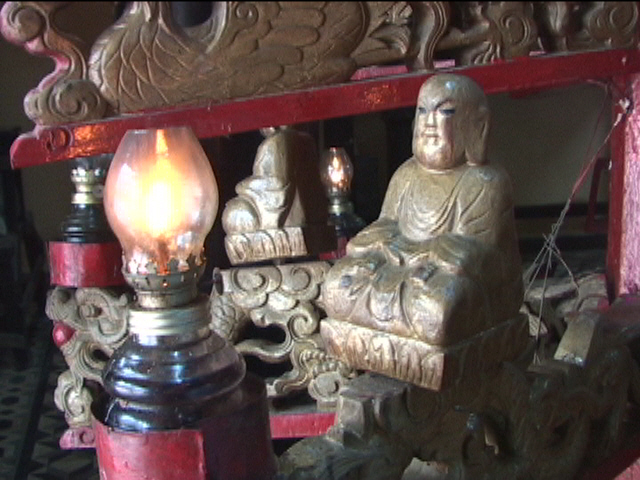
This little contemplative figure is part of a large candle-holder, in which each candle is faced by such a figure.

The main building of the temple itself is of rectangular shape, measuring 65 m in length and 22 m in width. The building comprises three main rooms: the main ceremonial hall, the dharma preaching hall and the meal hall, notwithstanding the other accessory rooms and buildings. In all, there are 98 pillars in the temple. On the pillars are carved 86 phrases, continuously around the temple, with inscriptions in gold paint in an articulate way. The entrance to the building is adorned with dragons. The altars in the main ceremonial hall are made from precious wood, which makes it particularly sturdy.

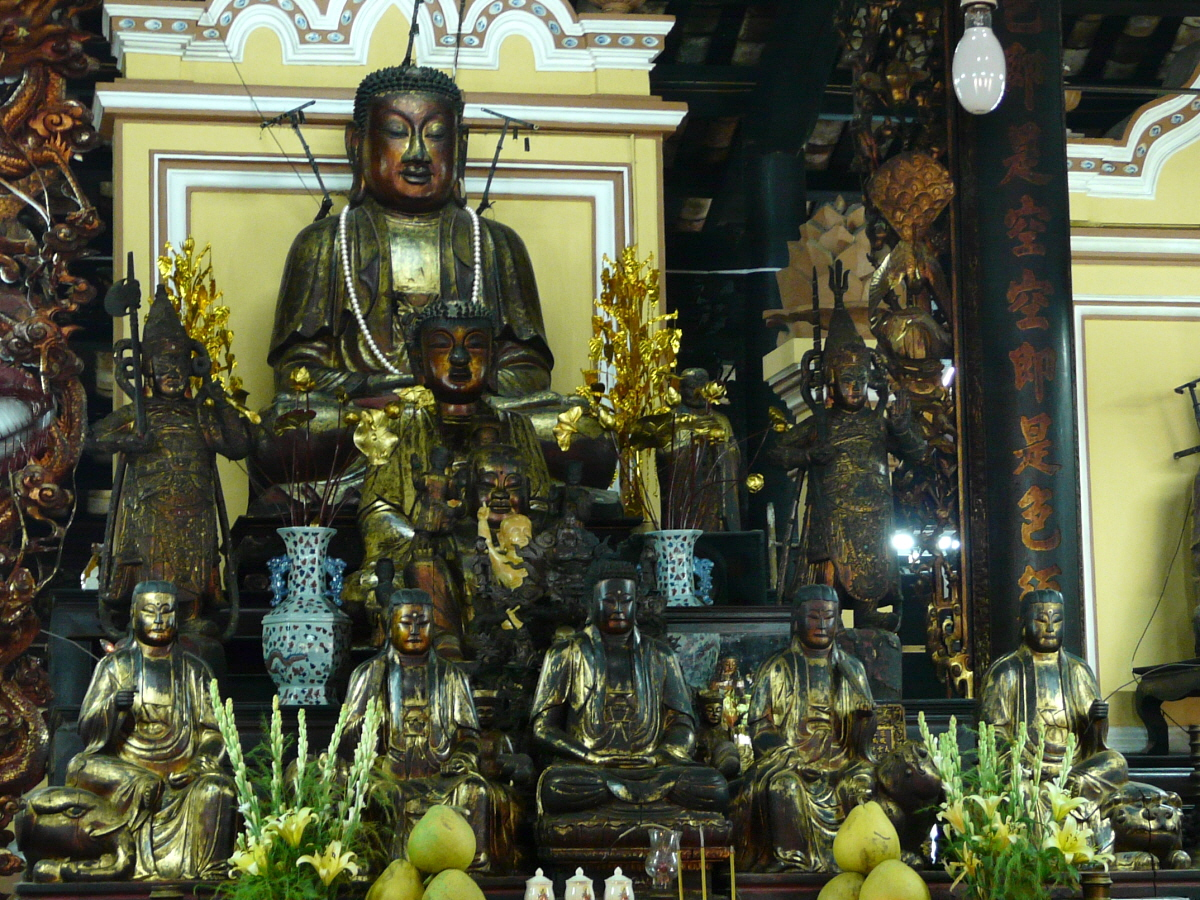
The large statue that dominates the main altar is of Amitabha Buddha. The five smaller statues in the front are of Sakyamuni Buddha and the four principal bodhisattvas.

The main altar is dominated by a statue of Amitabha Buddha. In front of Amitabha is a row of five seated figures: they are Sakyamuni Buddha and the four principal bodhisattvas: Samantabhadra, Manjusri, Avalokiteshvara, and Mahasthamaprapta. They form a group that is typical for Mahayanist pagodas of southern Vietnam.

In all, Giác Lâm Temple has 112 historic statues, made from wood with gold coatings painted onto the exterior. In addition, there are seven bronze statues. All of the statues, tables and the relic tower are hand crafted. The oldest statue is one of Gautama Buddha on a lotus seat that dates back to the 18th century. It is made of wood and stands 65 cm tall and 38 cm wide and is located in the dharma hall. The Nine Dragons altar in the main hall depicts the birth of Prince Siddhartha (Vesak) and is made of bronze. There are two sets of statues depict eighteen arahants. The smaller set consists of statues totalling 57 cm in height; the base is 7 cm while the remainder is the base of the statue. These were created at the start of the 19th century. The larger set stands approximately 95 cm in total height, with a base of 15 cm, and was created in the early years of the 20th century. The two sets of arahant statues are placed on either side of the Buddha statue in the main building.

=== Stupas of abbots ===
On the left side of the temple is a series of stupas for each of the abbots who have presided over the temple: Thích Viên Quang, Thích Hải Tịnh, Thích Minh Vi, Thích Minh Khiêm, Thích Như Lợi and Thích Như Phòng. The complex is also the location of the stupa of the patriarch Thích Phật Ý, the master of the patriarch Thích Viên Quang, who was the abbot of Sắc tứ Từ Ân (originally located in Chợ Đũi area, now is Tao Đàn Park; then relocated to Phú Lâm due to being torched in the war when the French colonial empire occupied Gia Định). Whose remains were moved to Giác Lâm in 1923.

== Gallery ==
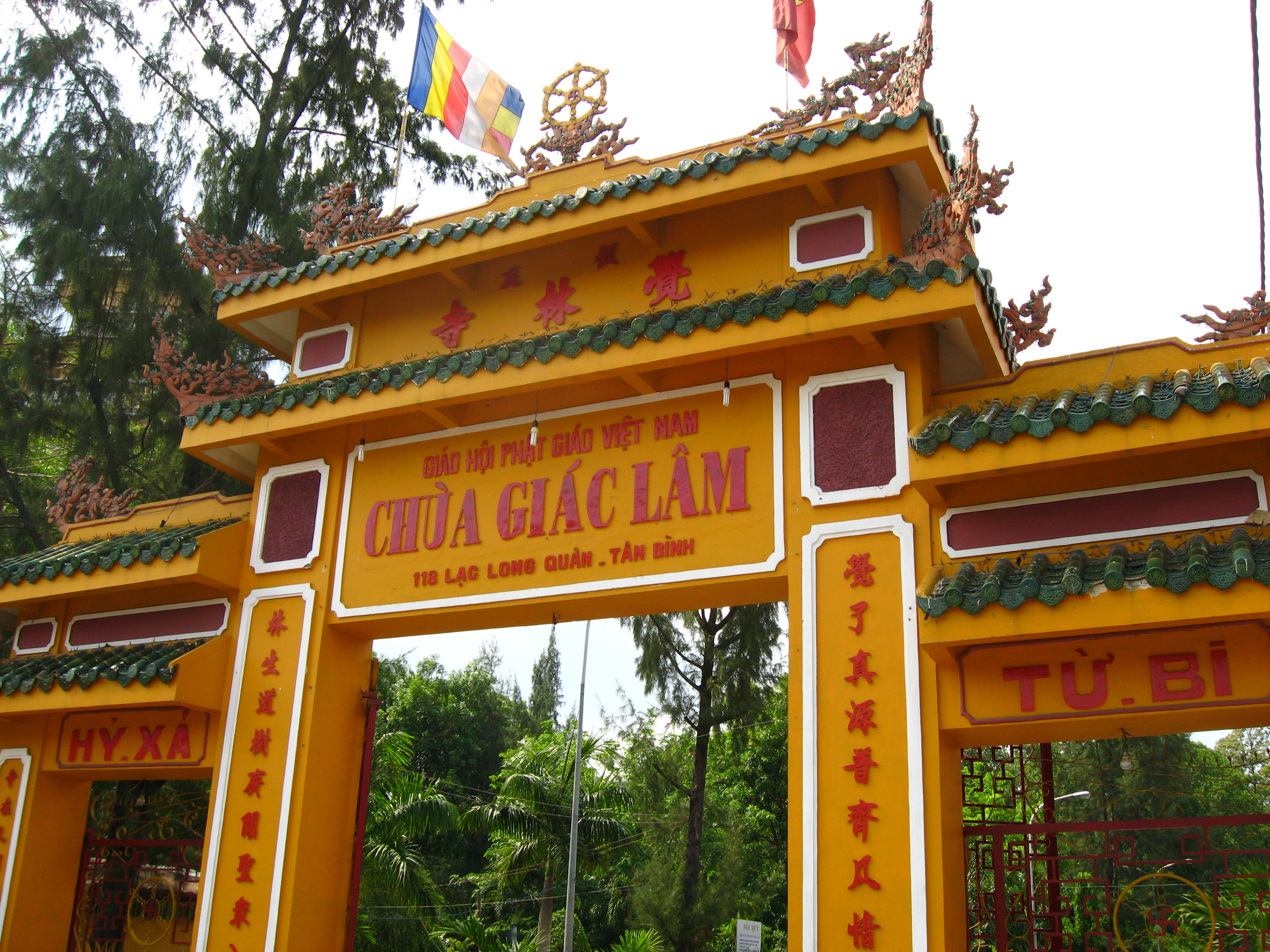
Giac Lam Gate

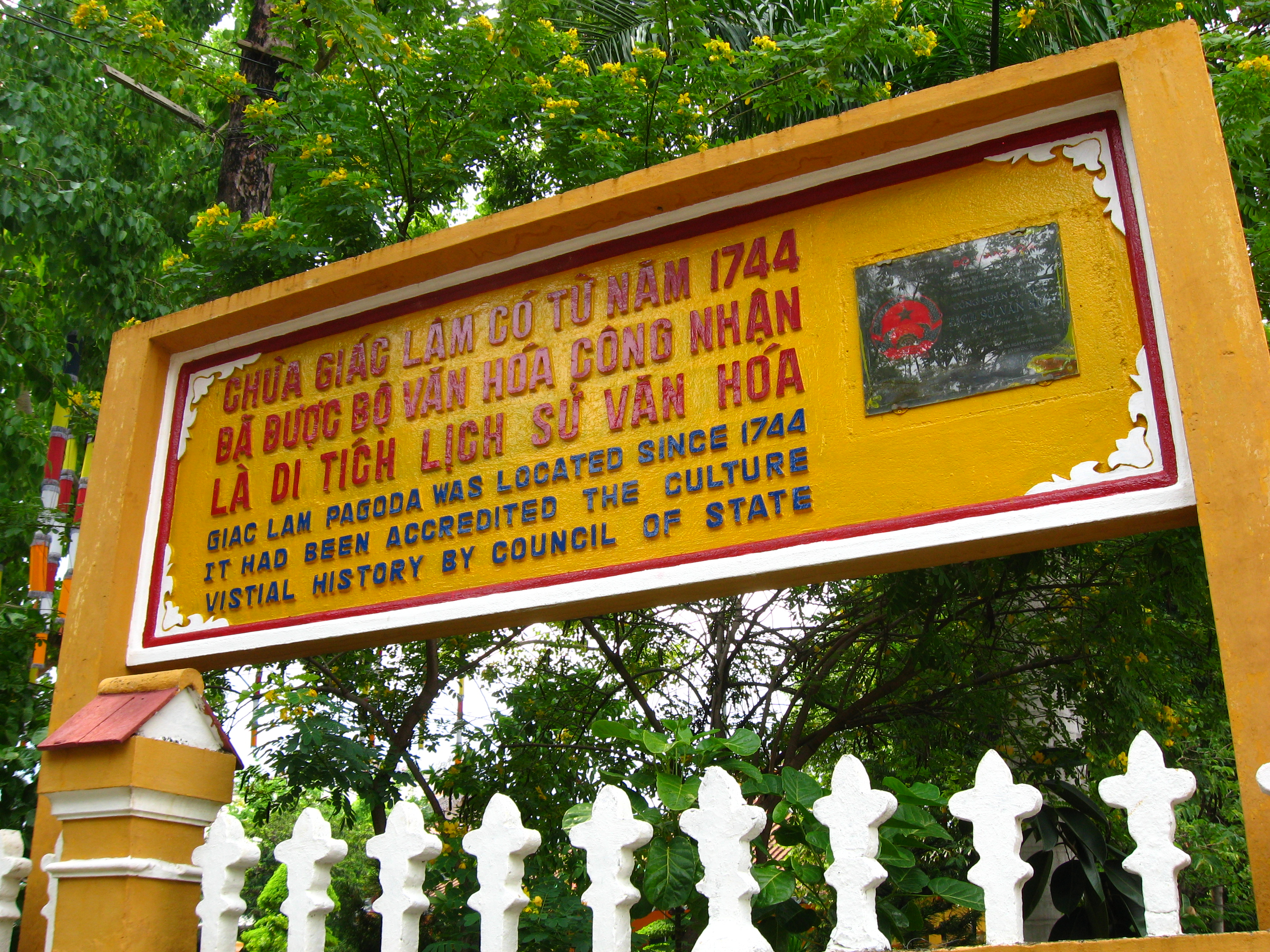

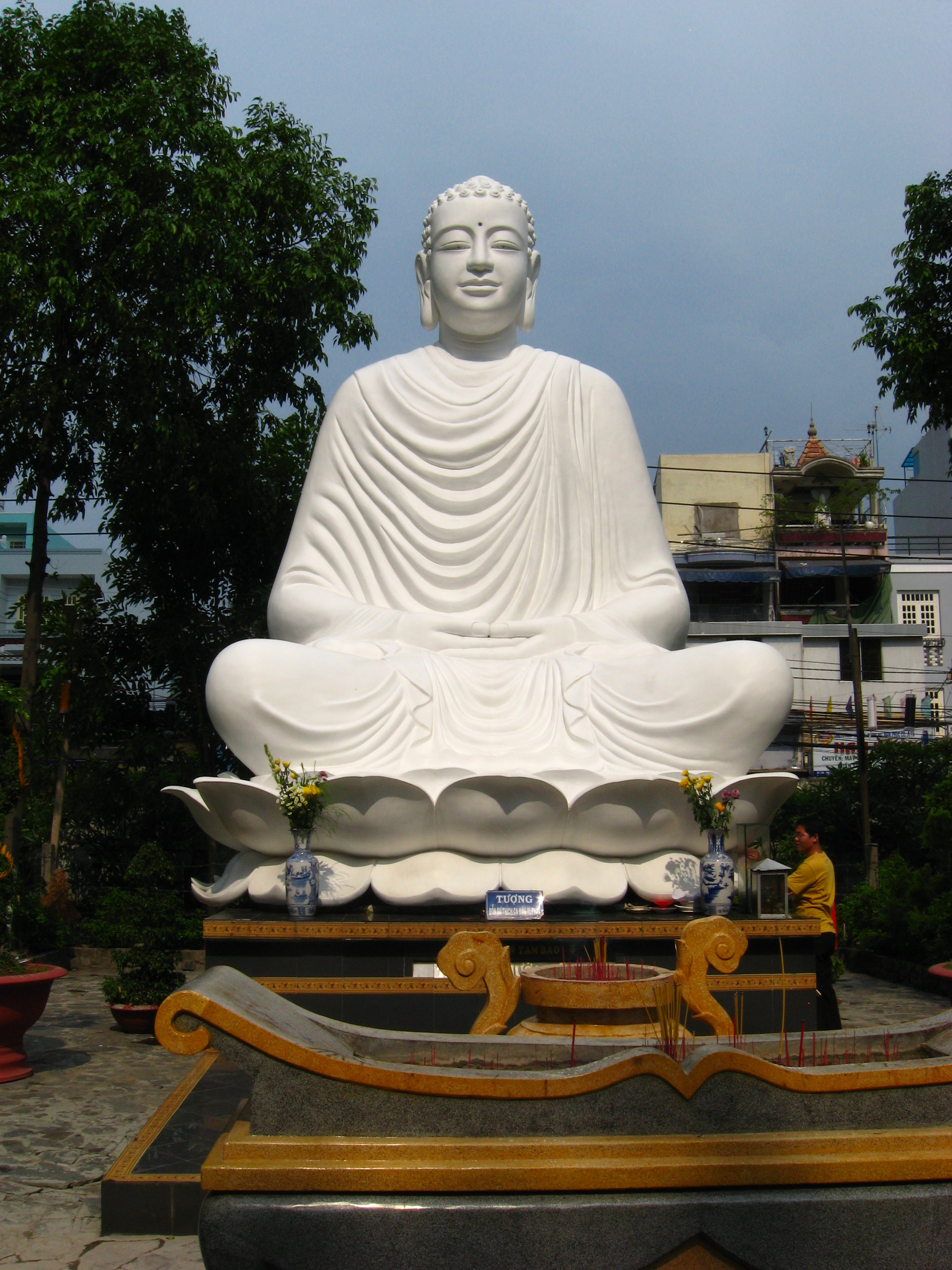

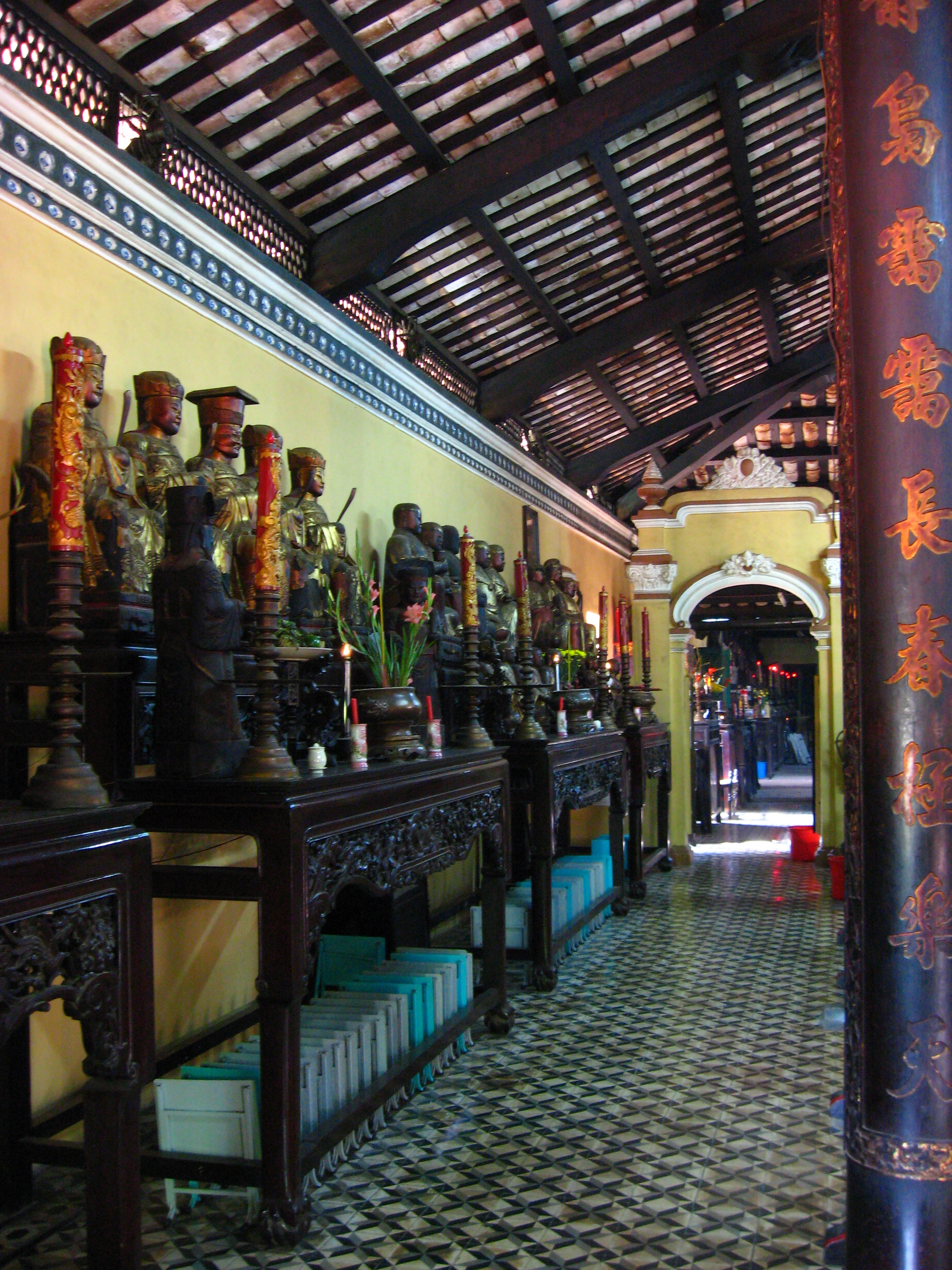

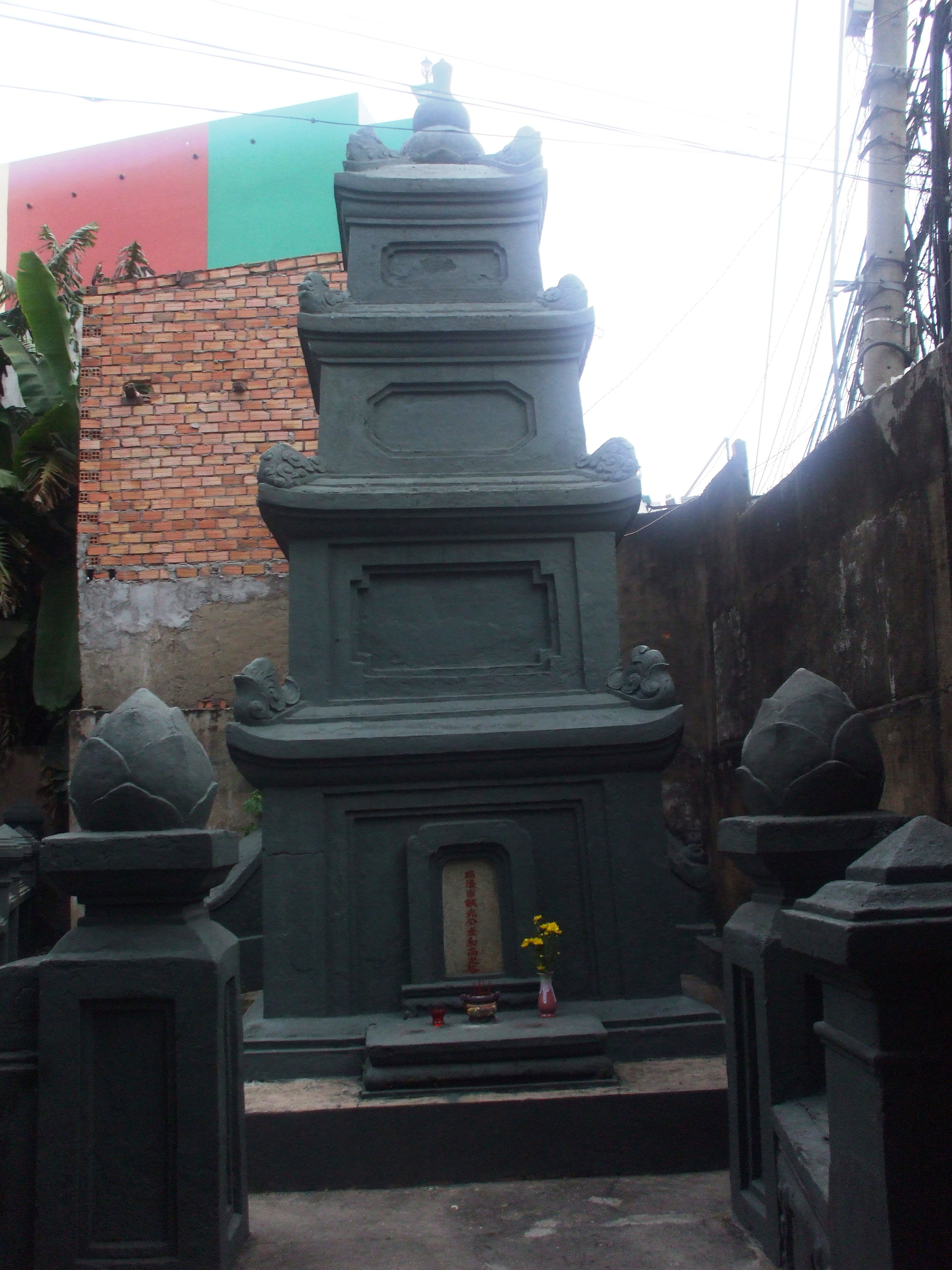
Vien Quang Stupas
