= Nigerians in Vietnam =

- (Nigeria) (Vietnam)

Total population
- 600 (2023)

Languages
- Nigerian English • Vietnamese

Religion
- Islam • Christianity • Buddhism

Related ethnic groups
- Nigerian diaspora

Nigerians in Vietnam are mostly expatriates from Nigeria residing in Vietnam for business or economic purposes. They are part of a new wave of Nigerian emigrants going to non-traditional migration destinations such as Ethiopia, Ghana, and Mozambique rather than traditional favorites like Libya, the United Kingdom, or the United States. They refer to poor economic conditions in their homeland, including lack of electricity and public safety, as their primary motivations for emigration.

== Business and employment ==
Many Africans, including Nigerians, run fashion shops in Tan Phu district, Ho Chi Minh City. Others are believed to have been attracted to the country by offers of contracts with Vietnamese football teams around 2006 and 2007, but were later replaced by Brazilian players and had their contracts terminated. Wages in the country are low, equivalent to just US$200/month even for a college graduate, meaning many of the migrants find it difficult to make a living.

== Community organizations ==
In 2009, at the suggestion of Vietnamese immigration officials, Nigerian residents formed the Nigerian Union in Vietnam in an effort of self-policing, in order to improve the public image of Nigerians and represent legitimate Nigerian businesspeople effectively to the authorities.
