= Phú Thạnh =

Phú Thạnh Phường Phú Thạnh Tân Hòa Tây, Tân Thới Hòa
- Ward
- Interactive map of Phú Thạnh
- Coordinates: 10°46′19″N 106°37′37″E
- Country: Vietnam
- Municipality: Ho Chi Minh City
- Established: November 5th, 2003

Area
  - Total: 1.15 sq mi (2.99 km^{2})

Population (2024)
  - Total: 103,780
  - Density: 89,900/sq mi (34,700/km^{2})
- Time zone: UTC+07:00 (Indochina Time)
- Administrative code: 27028

Phú Thạnh (Vietnamese: Phường Phú Thạnh) is a ward of Ho Chi Minh City, Vietnam. It is one of the 168 new wards, communes and special zones of the city following the reorganization in 2025.

== History ==
On November 5, 2003, the government issued Decree 103/2003/ND-CP. It states that, Tân Phú district will be established by separating a part of Tân Bình district; and Phú Thạnh was established on the basis of 114 hectares of natural area and 28,847 people of Ward 18, Tân Bình district.

On June 16, 2025, the National Assembly Standing Committee issued Resolution No. 1685/NQ-UBTVQH15 on the arrangement of commune-level administrative units of Ho Chi Minh City in 2025 (effective from June 16, 2025). Accordingly, the entire land area and population of Hiệp Tân, Phú Thạnh wards and part of Tân Thới Hòa ward of the former Tân Phú district will be integrated into a new ward named Phú Thạnh (Clause 66, Article 1).
