= Tân Sơn Nhất (disambiguation) =

Tân Sơn Nhất may refer to:

- Tan Son Nhat International Airport, international airport in Ho Chi Minh City, Vietnam
- Tân Sơn Nhất, Ho Chi Minh City, ward of Ho Chi Minh City
