= Bảy Hiền =

Bảy Hiền Phường Bảy Hiền
- Ward
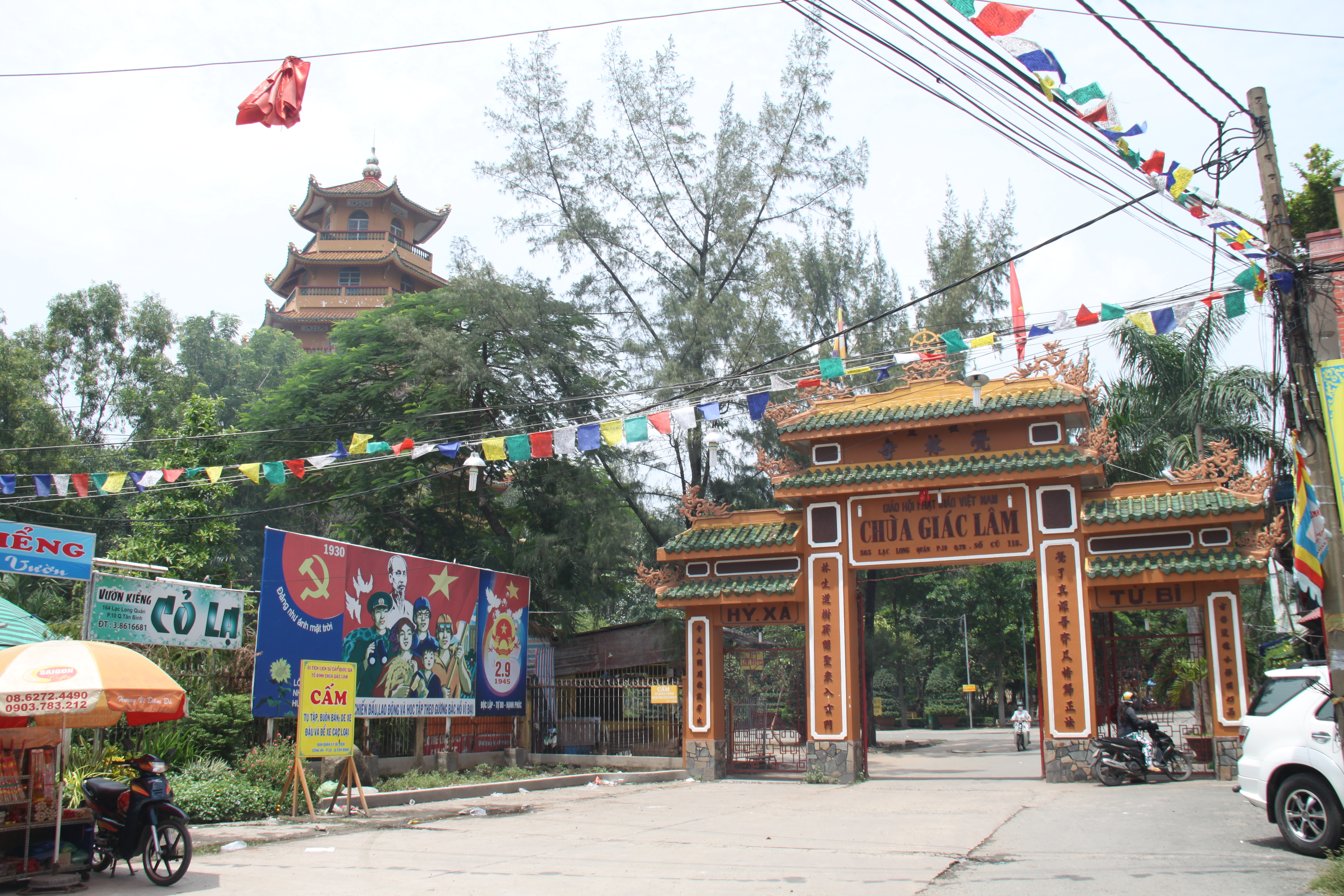
- Giác Lâm Pagoda
- Interactive map of Bảy Hiền
- Coordinates: 10°47′20″N 106°38′53″E
- Country: Vietnam
- Municipality: Ho Chi Minh City
- Established: June 16, 2025

Area
  - Total: 1.10 sq mi (2.86 km^{2})

Population (2024)
  - Total: 132,252
  - Density: 120,000/sq mi (46,200/km^{2})
- Time zone: UTC+07:00 (Indochina Time)
- Administrative code: 26983

Bảy Hiền (Vietnamese: Phường Bảy Hiền) is a ward of Ho Chi Minh City, Vietnam. It is one of the 168 new wards, communes and special zones of the city following the reorganization in 2025.

== History ==
On June 16, 2025, the National Assembly Standing Committee issued Resolution No. 1685/NQ-UBTVQH15 on the arrangement of commune-level administrative units of Ho Chi Minh City in 2025 (effective from June 16, 2025). Accordingly, the entire land area and population of Ward 10, Ward 11 and Ward 12 of the former Tân Bình district will be integrated into a new ward named Bảy Hiền (Clause 59, Article 1).
