= Hoàng Văn Thụ Park =

Park in Ho Chi Minh City

- Công viên Hoàng Văn Thụ
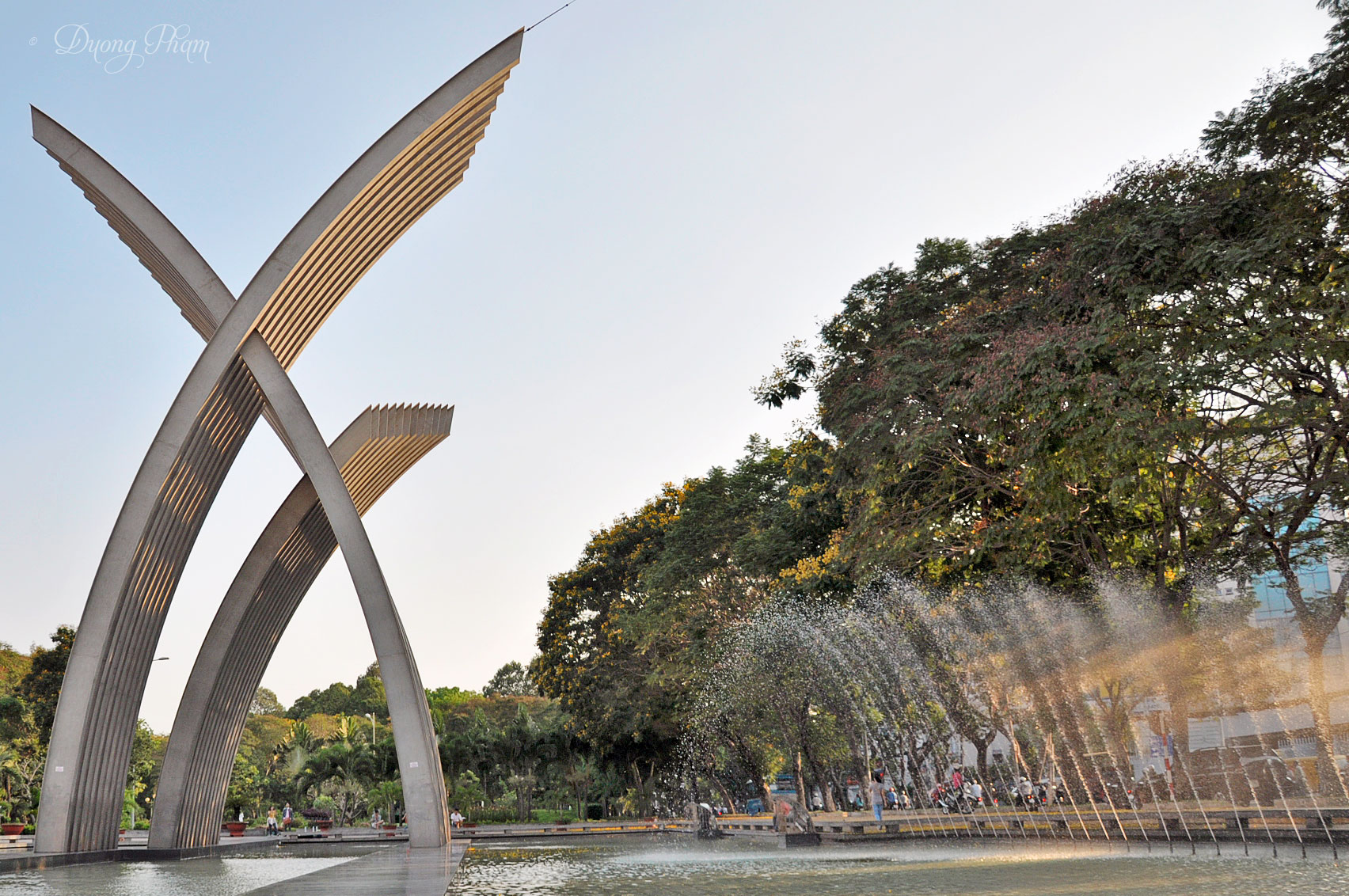
- The park modernist-styled gate symbolizing hands with fingers interlaced at the end of Trường Sơn Street, the main street directly connected to the airport
- Interactive map of Hoàng Văn Thụ Park
- Type: Urban park
- Location: Tân Sơn Hòa, Tan Binh District, Ho Chi Minh City
- Coordinates: 10°48′04″N 106°39′51″E
- Area: 81,011 square metres (20.018 acres)
- Administrator: Tan Binh District Public Service Single-member LLC
- Open: 28 March 1989
- Status: Open all year
- Public transit: L5 Lăng Cha Cả station (planned), Bus
- Website: congvienhoangvanthu.com

Hoàng Văn Thụ Park (Vietnamese: Công viên Hoàng Văn Thụ) is a park located in Ho Chi Minh City, Vietnam, to the south of Tan Son Nhat International Airport.

== Design ==
The park is a green space in the shape of a triangle, covering an area of approximately 81,011 square metres (20.018 acres), bounded by streets of Hoàng Văn Thụ, Phan Đình Giót, and Trần Quốc Hoàn. It is divided into two sections by Phan Thúc Duyện Street, a street which is lead to Terminal 3 of Tan Son Nhat International Airport. Adjacent to the park are the Lăng Cha Cả Roundabout (formerly the mausoleum of Pierre Pigneau de Béhaine) and the 7th Military Region Stadium.

Within the park, there is a recreational fishing lake covering an area of 7,852 square metres (1.940 acres). Additionally, there is a children's playground area covering 820 square metres (0.20 acres), inaugurated in 2012.

Around mid-2023, a portion of the park was diminished by roughly 1,600 square metres (0.40 acres) to facilitate the building of the Phan Thúc Duyện underpass at the nearby busy intersection, aiming to alleviate traffic congestion in the airport gateway vicinity. Once the project concludes, nearly 700 square metres (0.17 acres) will be allocated for tree replanting by the construction team, while the rest will be utilized for sidewalk enhancement.

== History ==
Previously, the park's land belonged to the helipad of the 3rd Field Hospital of the United States Army during the Vietnam War. After the Fall of Saigon, it came under the management of 7th Military Region of Vietnam People's Army. The park was established in 1989 and is currently managed by the Tan Binh District Public Service Single-member LLC.
