= Tân Sơn Nhì =

Tân Sơn Nhì Phường Tân Sơn Nhì Bà Quẹo
- Ward
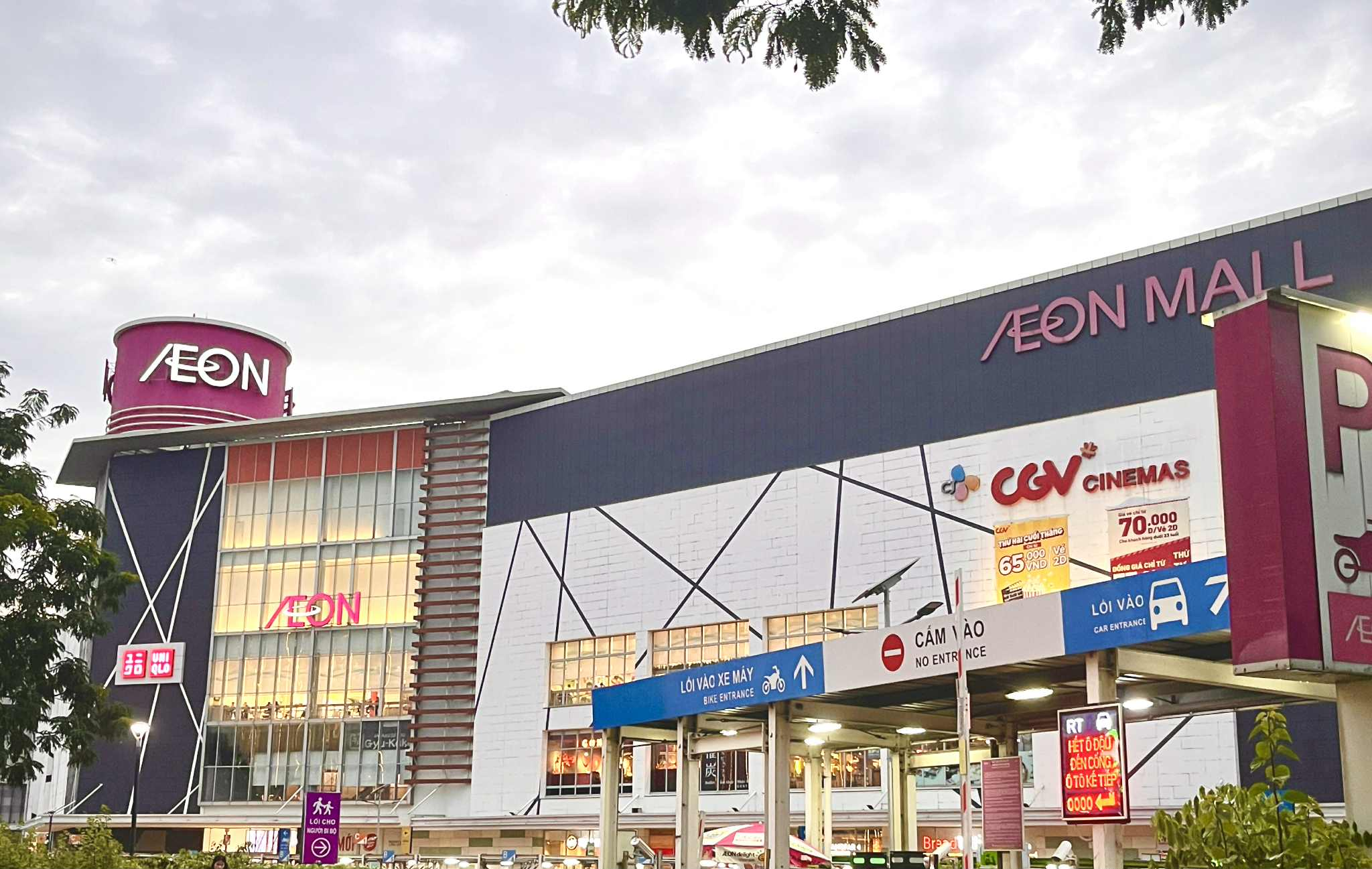
- Interactive map of Tân Sơn Nhì
- Coordinates: 10°47′55″N 106°37′53″E
- Country: Vietnam
- Municipality: Ho Chi Minh City
- Established: June 16, 2025

Area
  - Total: 1.34 sq mi (3.46 km^{2})

Population (2024)
  - Total: 117,277
  - Density: 87,800/sq mi (33,900/km^{2})
- Time zone: UTC+07:00 (Indochina Time)
- Administrative code: 27019

Tân Sơn Nhì (Vietnamese: Phường Tân Sơn Nhì) is a ward of Ho Chi Minh City, Vietnam. It is one of the 168 new wards, communes and special zones of the city following the reorganization in 2025.

The ward is the site of the AEON MALL Tân Phú Celadon, the first Aeon Mall in Vietnam.

== Administration ==
Tân Sơn Nhì is divided into 51 neighborhoods, numbered from 1 to 51.

== History ==
On June 16, 2025, the National Assembly Standing Committee issued Resolution No. 1685/NQ-UBTVQH15 on the arrangement of commune-level administrative units of Ho Chi Minh City in 2025 (effective from June 16, 2025). Accordingly, the entire land area and population of Tân Sơn Nhì ward and part of Sơn Kỳ, Tân Quý, Tân Thành wards of the former Tân Phú district will be integrated into a new ward named Tân Sơn Nhì (Clause 63, Article 1).
