= Phú Thọ Hòa =

Phú Thọ Hòa Phường Phú Thọ Hòa Tân Phú, Lộc Hòa
- Ward
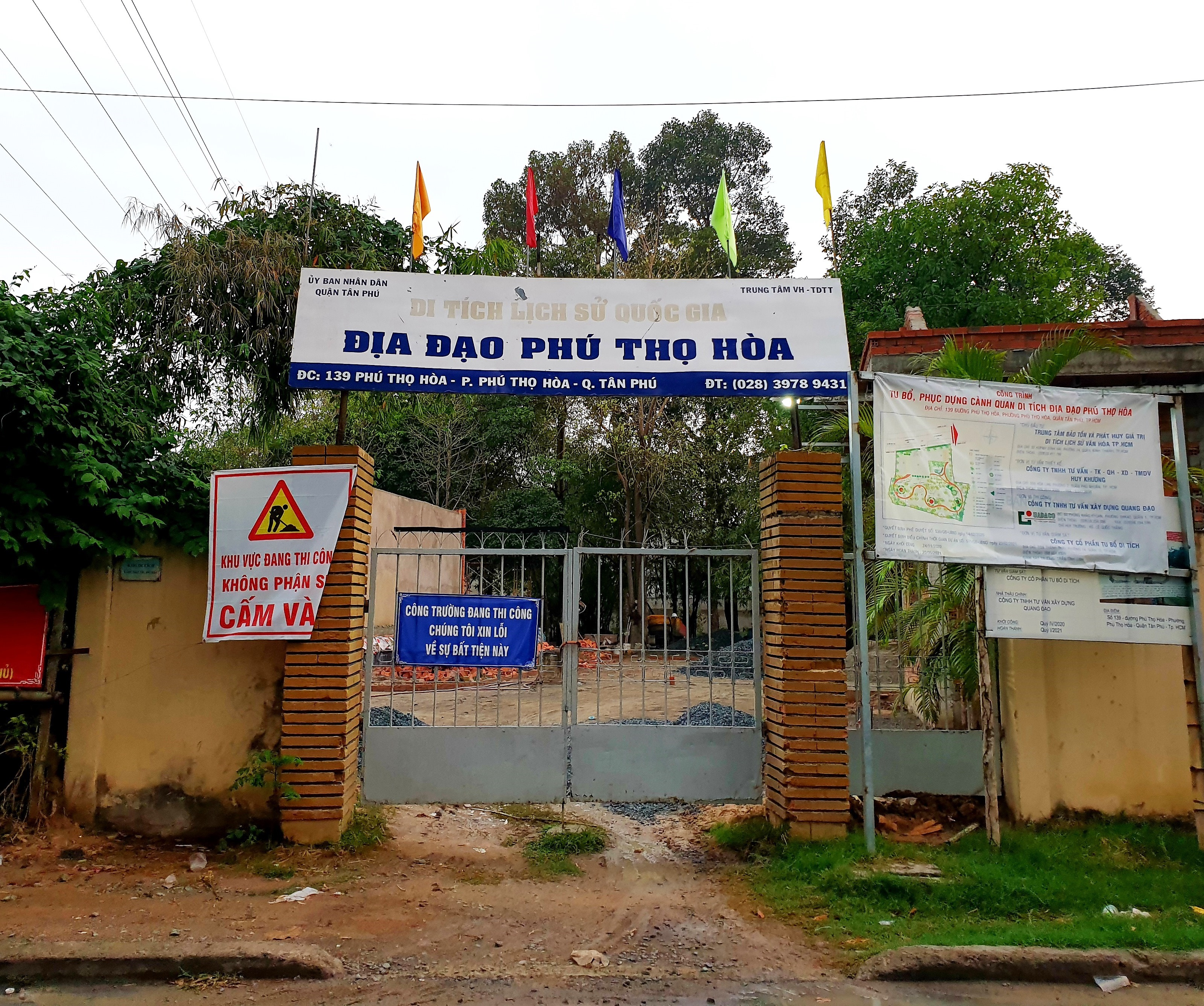
- Phú Thọ Hòa Tunnels
- Interactive map of Phú Thọ Hòa
- Coordinates: 10°47′07″N 106°37′43″E
- Country: Vietnam
- Municipality: Ho Chi Minh City
- Established: June 16, 2025

Area
  - Total: 1.17 sq mi (3.02 km^{2})

Population (2024)
  - Total: 140,436
  - Density: 120,000/sq mi (46,500/km^{2})
- Time zone: UTC+07:00 (Indochina Time)
- Administrative code: 27022

Phú Thọ Hòa (Vietnamese: Phường Phú Thọ Hòa) is a ward of Ho Chi Minh City, Vietnam. It is one of the 168 new wards, communes and special zones of the city following the reorganization in 2025.

The ward is the site of the Phú Thọ Hòa tunnels, one of the first tunnel systems in Southern Vietnam. The tunnels were originally dug in 1947 at the hamlet of Lộc Hòa, the suburb of Saigon.

== History ==
On June 16, 2025, the National Assembly Standing Committee issued Resolution No. 1685/NQ-UBTVQH15 on the arrangement of commune-level administrative units of Ho Chi Minh City in 2025 (effective from June 16, 2025). Accordingly, the entire land area and population of Phú Thọ Hòa ward and part of Tân Thành, Tân Quý wards of the former Tân Phú district will be integrated into a new ward named Phú Thọ Hòa (Clause 64, Article 1).
