= Tân Phú district, Ho Chi Minh City =

Tân Phú district Quận Tân Phú
- Urban district
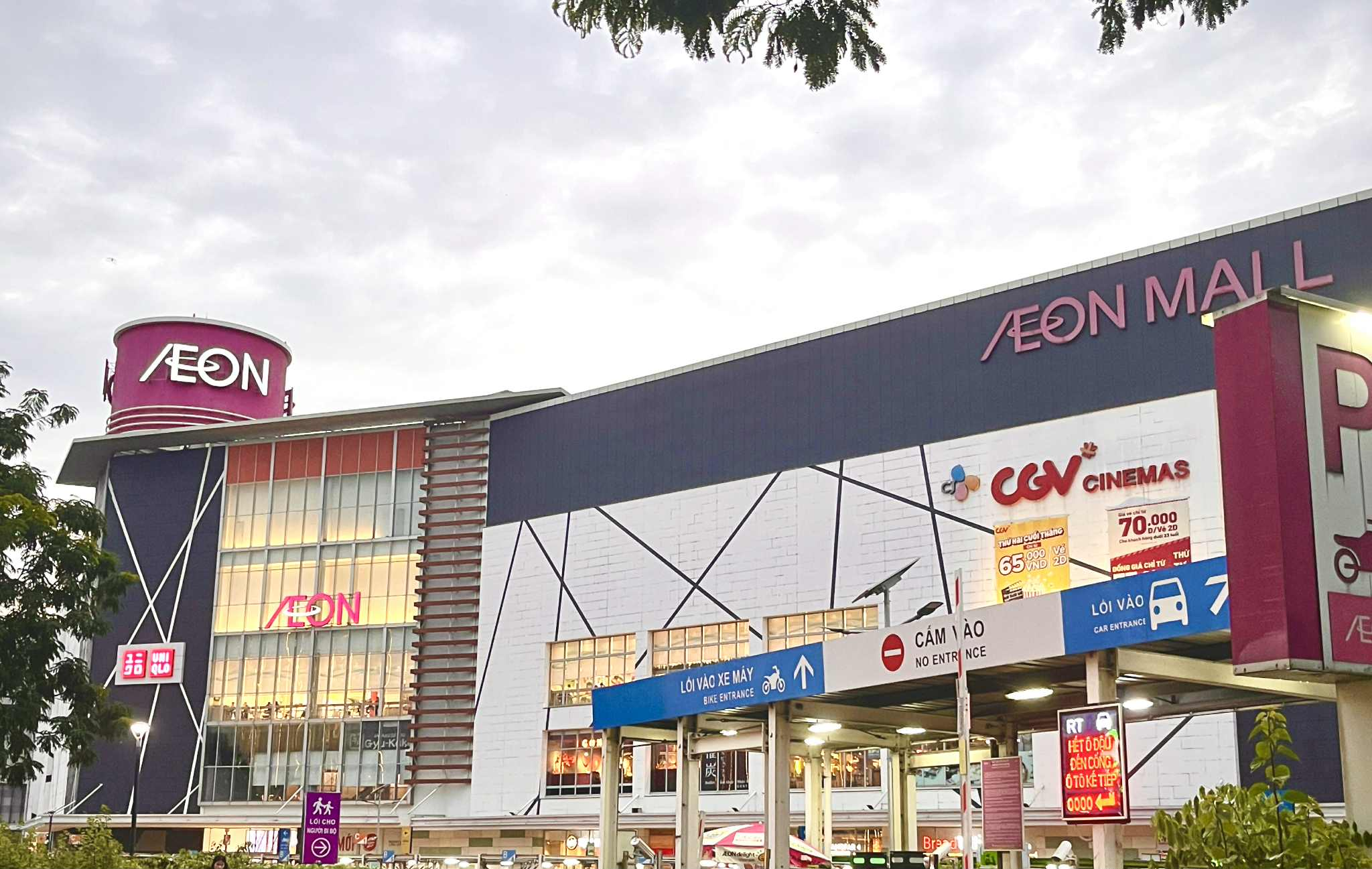
- AEON Tân Phú Celadon Mall

- Seal

- Position in HCMC's core

- Location within Vietnam
- Coordinates: 10°47′32″N 106°37′31″E
- Country: Vietnam
- Centrally governed city: Ho Chi Minh City
- Founded: 2003
- Seat: Hoà Thạnh ward
- Wards: 11 phường

Government
  - People's Council: Nguyễn Thành Chung
  - People's Committee: Phạm Minh Mẫn; Deputy Secretary of the District Party Committee
  - Secretary: Lê Thị Kim Hồng

Area
  - Total: 16 km^{2} (6.2 sq mi)

Population (2024)
  - Total: 585,348
  - Density: 37,000/km^{2} (95,000/sq mi)

Demographics
  - Main ethnic groups: predominantly Kinh
- Time zone: UTC+07 (ICT)
- Website: tanphu.hochiminhcity.gov.vn

Tân Phú District (Vietnamese: Quận Tân Phú) was an urban district of Ho Chi Minh City, the largest city in Vietnam. Established in 2003 from the division of Tân Bình district, it covered an area of 15.97 km² and had a population of 585,348 as of 2024. The district was dissolved on June 30, 2025, following a national resolution to reorganize administrative units, with its wards merged and redistributed.

Prior to its dissolution, Tân Phú bordered District 12 to the north, Tân Bình district to the east, Bình Tân district to the west, and District 6 and District 11 to the south.

== History ==
The area of Tân Phú has historical roots dating back over 50 years, originally part of Tân Bình District in the former Gia Định Province. It encompassed villages such as Hòa Thạnh, Lộc Hòa, Phú Thọ, Tân Hòa Tây, Tân Sơn Nhì, Tân Thới, and Tân Trụ within the Dương Hòa Thượng commune.

Post-1975, administrative reorganizations occurred. On May 20, 1976, Tân Bình District was re-established by merging Tân Sơn Hòa and Tân Sơn Nhì districts. On November 5, 2003, the Vietnamese Government issued Decree No. 130/2003/NĐ-CP, separating Tân Phú from Tân Bình District. This new district incorporated the entirety of wards 16, 17, 18, 19, and 20, along with portions of wards 14 and 15 from Tân Bình, resulting in an initial area of 1,606.98 hectares and a population of 310,876.

On June 16, 2025, the Standing Committee of the National Assembly issued Resolution No. 1685/NQ-UBTVQH15, effective June 30, 2025, dissolving Tân Phú District and reorganizing its wards into five new ones: Tây Thạnh (merging Tây Thạnh and part of Sơn Kỳ), Tân Sơn Nhì (merging Tân Sơn Nhì and parts of Sơn Kỳ, Tân Quý, Tân Thành), Phú Thọ Hòa (merging Phú Thọ Hòa and parts of Tân Quý, Tân Thành), Phú Thạnh (merging Phú Thạnh, Hiệp Tân, and part of Tân Thới Hòa), and Tân Phú (merging Phú Trung, Hòa Thạnh, and parts of Tân Thành, Tân Thới Hòa).

== Geography ==
Tân Phú was located in the northern central part of Ho Chi Minh City. It spanned 15.97 km², featuring urban landscapes with significant green spaces and infrastructure developments.

== Economy ==
Tân Phú's economy focused on industry, commerce, and services. In 2007, industrial production value reached 4,404.31 billion VND, a 25.58% increase from 2006, while commerce and services revenue hit 9,946.11 billion VND, up 29.04%. Key developments included shopping centers like AEON Tân Phú Celadon Mall, Co.op Mart, and Bách Hóa Xanh, alongside high-rise apartments integrating commercial spaces.

The district housed the Tân Bình Industrial Park in Tây Thạnh ward. By 2024, it emphasized smart and modern economic growth, with state budget revenue achieving 136% of the annual plan, a 22% increase year-over-year. Industrial-construction output and commercial-service values also grew significantly.

In 2025, prior to dissolution, plans included auctioning a 26-hectare site for a Transit-Oriented Development (TOD) near Metro Line 2 (Bến Thành - Tham Lương) to boost urban connectivity and economic activity.

== Administration ==
Before dissolution, Tân Phú comprised 11 wards: Tân Sơn Nhì, Tây Thạnh, Sơn Kỳ, Tân Quý, Tân Thành, Phú Thọ Hòa, Phú Thạnh, Phú Trung, Hòa Thạnh, Hiệp Tân, and Tân Thới Hòa. The district seat was in Hòa Thạnh ward.

Ward	Area (km²)	Population (2019)	Density (people/km²)
Hiệp Tân	1.11	30,753	27,705
Hòa Thạnh	0.94	32,368	34,434
Phú Thạnh	1.17	43,292	37,002
Phú Thọ Hòa	1.21	46,834	38,706
Phú Trung	0.89	43,142	48,474
Tân Quý	1.69	66,847	39,554
Tân Sơn Nhì	1.13	42,327	37,458
Tân Thành	0.99	39,943	40,346
Tân Thới Hòa	1.15	31,070	27,017
Tây Thạnh	3.50	64,412	18,403
Sơn Kỳ	2.24	48,113	21,479

== Landmarks ==
Notable sites included the Phú Thọ Hòa Tunnels, a historical underground network built in 1947 spanning about 10 km, recognized as a revolutionary site. Other attractions were Tân Thới Temple and modern commercial hubs like AEON Mall.
