= Tân Bình district =

Tân Bình district Quận Tân Bình
- Urban district
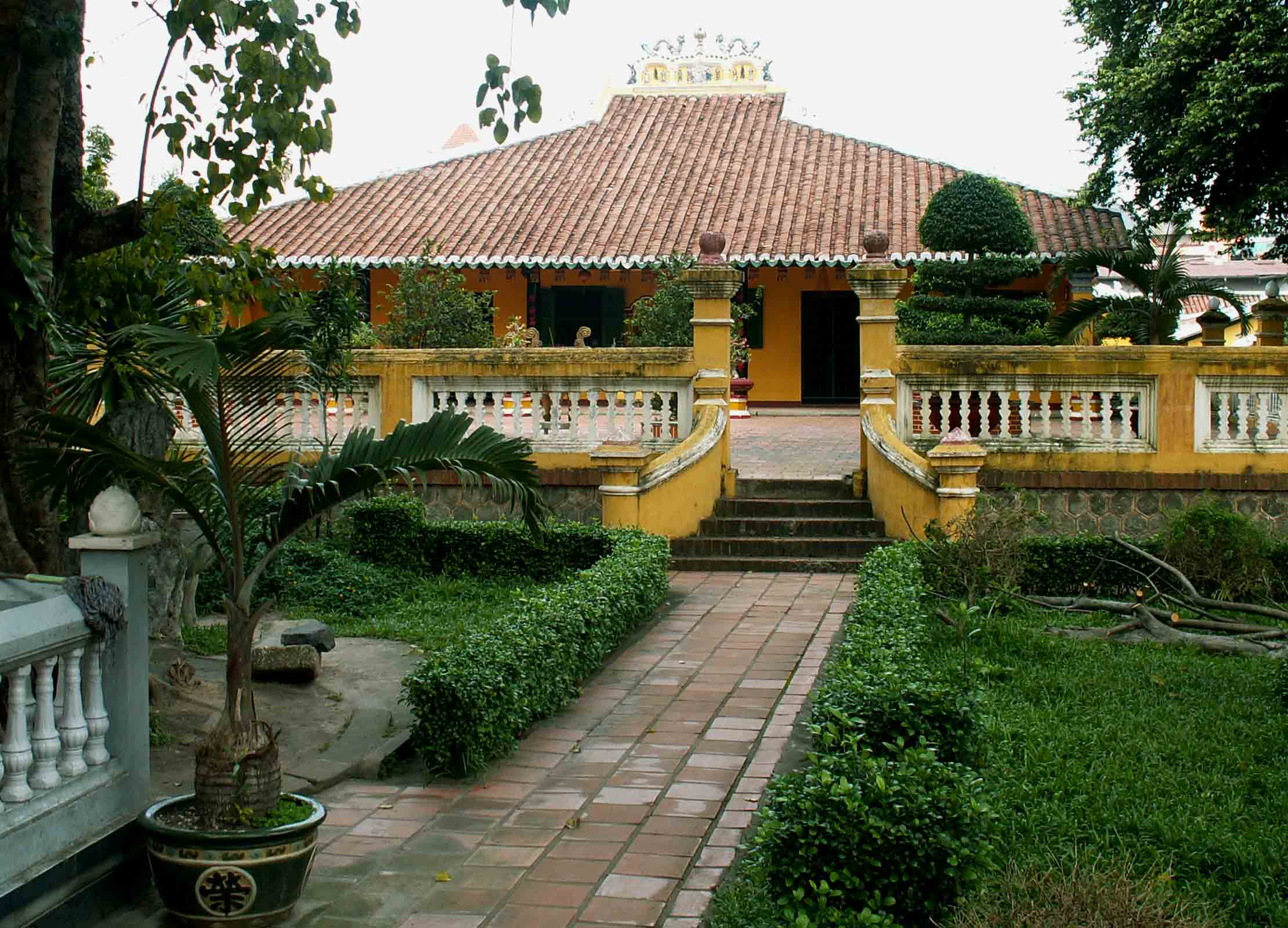
- Giác Lâm Temple

- Position in HCMC's core

- Location within Vietnam
- Coordinates: 10°47′39″N 106°39′16″E
- Country: Vietnam
- Centrally governed city: Ho Chi Minh City
- Abolished: 1 July 2025
- Seat: 387A Trường Chinh
- Wards: 15 phường

Government
  - People's Committee: Nguyễn Bá Thành

Area
  - Total: 22.43 km^{2} (8.66 sq mi)

Population (2024)
  - Total: 574,792
  - Density: 25,630/km^{2} (66,370/sq mi)

Demographics
  - Main ethnic groups: Predominantly Việt
- Time zone: UTC+07:00 (ICT)
- Website: tanbinh.hochiminhcity.gov.vn

Tân Bình was a former urban district of Ho Chi Minh City, Vietnam. The city's international airport was situated in the district. It consisted of 15 wards, from Ward 1 to Ward 15. It occupied 22.43 km^{2} (8.66 sq mi). In the 2019 census, Tân Bình district had a population of 474,792 people.

== Geography ==
Tân Bình was situated within the urban core of Ho Chi Minh City. Most of the district landscape was flat with the highest natural elevation being around 8–9 m (26–30 ft) in the area of Tân Sơn Nhất International Airport.

== Demographics ==
Historical population

Year	Pop.	±% p.a.
1976	280,942	—
1980	250,472	−2.83%
1985	287,978	+2.83%
1990	357,202	+4.40%
1995	464,165	+5.38%

Year	Pop.	±% p.a.
2000	646,407	+6.85%
2003	754,160	+5.27%
2004	404,239	−46.40%
2009	421,724	+0.85%
2019	474,792	+1.19%

Note: Tân Bình was partitioned in late 2003 to create Tân Phú district
Source: Tân Bình District People's Council, 2009 Census, 2019 Census

As of the April 1, 2019 census, there were 133,745 households and 474,792 residents in the district. 16.5% were under the age of 14, 77.5% from 15 to 64, and 6% who were 65 years of age or older. For every 100 females, there were 94.0 males.

=== Ethnic groups ===
In 2004, the population was predominantly ethnic Vietnamese (Kinh) with 93.33%. The second-largest ethnic group was the Chinese (Hoa) with 6.38%. Other ethnic groups included Khmer with 0.11%, Tày with 0,05%, Nùng with 0,03%, Mường with 0,02%, Chăm with 0,02% and Thái with 0,01% of the population.

=== Religion ===
According to the 1999 census, 56.68% reported to be non-religious, 22.9% practiced Catholicism, 19.62% practiced Buddhism, 0.4% practiced Cao Dai, 0.37% practiced Protestantism, 0.02% were Muslims while 0.01% followed Hoa Hao.

== Education ==
Tân Bình district had one of the most notable high schools in Ho Chi Minh City, the Nguyễn Thượng Hiền High School. Other public high schools are Nguyễn Chí Thanh High School, Nguyễn Thái Bình High School and one of the most popular private high school in Ho Chi Minh City, Lý Tự Trọng High School.

Tân Bình School's Disability Workplace Education and Training Project is a collaborative project involving Tân Bình District Department of Education and Training, RMIT University's Department of Social and Community Services and the Loreto Vietnam Australia Program (LVAP). The project is funded by the Australian Government International Aid Program (AusAID) and technical support is provided by AVI (Australian Volunteers International).
