= Tan Dinh =

Tân Định may refer to several places in Vietnam:

- Tân Định, Ho Chi Minh City, a ward and neighborhood in the northwest of central Saigon area
  - Tân Định Church, the main Catholic church of the neighborhood, known for its iconic pink color
  - Tân Định Market, the central market of the neighborhood with its iconic yellow and French Indochine archiecture
- Tân Định, Khánh Hòa, a commune in the former Ninh Hòa town, Ninh Thuận province

== See also ==
- Tân Dĩnh, a commune of Bắc Ninh province, previously part of Lạng Giang district
