= ISB =

ISB may refer to:

== Education ==
- Indian School of Business, Hyderabad, Telangana, India
- International School of Business (Vietnam) Ho Chi Minh City, Vietnam
- International School Bangkok, Nonthaburi, Thailand, formerly in Bangkok
- International School Basel, Basel, Switzerland
- International School of Beaverton, Aloha, Oregon, United States
- International School of Beijing, Beijing, China
- International School of Belgrade, Belgrade, Serbia
- International School of Bergen, Bergen, Norway
- International School of Boston, Cambridge, Massachusetts, United States
- International School of Broward, Hollywood, Florida, United States
- International School Brunei, Bandar Seri Begawan, Brunei
- International School of Brussels, Brussels, Belgium
- International School of Bucharest, Bucharest, Romania
- Instituto Simón Bolívar (Various countries)

== Music ==
- I Shalt Become, an American black metal duo
- The Incredible String Band, a British folk rock musical group of the late 1960s
- International Society of Bassists, an international society dedicated to the double bass
- International Staff Band, a brass band of the Salvation Army
- International Submarine Band, American country-rock group

== Religion ==
- Islamic Society of Baltimore, Catonsville, Maryland, United States
- Islamic Society of Boston, Boston, Massachusetts, United States
- Islamic Society of Britain, an Islamic organization

== Science ==
- International Society for Biocuration
- International Society of Biomechanics (Various countries)
- Institute for Systems Biology, non-profit research institute in Seattle, WA

== Other uses ==
- Impact Statement for Business, in UK law
- Imperial Security Bureau, the secret police force of the Empire in the Star Wars universe
- ISB Engine/Interact System B, a variant of the Cummins B Series engine used in Dodge trucks
- Independent sideband, radio modulation mode used in some AM radio transmissions
- International Socialist Bureau, the permanent organization of the Second International
- National Park Service Investigative Services Branch
- Islamabad International Airport, the current airport of Islamabad and Rawalpindi, Pakistan (IATA airport code: ISB)
  - Benazir Bhutto International Airport, formerly Islamabad International Airport, the former airport of Islamabad and Rawalpindi, Pakistan (formerly IATA airport code: ISB)
