= Tân Định Market =

- Chợ Tân Định
- Tân Định Market in 2014
- Former names: Phú Hòa Market (circa 19th century and before)

General information
- Type: Marketplace
- Architectural style: French Indochina
- Location: 314–336 Hai Bà Trưng Street, Tân Định, Ho Chi Minh City, Vietnam
- Coordinates: 10°47′24″N 106°41′24″E
- Construction started: 1926
- Inaugurated: July 26, 1927; 99 years ago
- Cost: 110.000 piastre

Design and construction
- Architect: Société Indochinoise d’Études et de Constructions (SIDEC)

Other information
- Public transit: L4 Le Van Tam Park station (planned)

Tân Định Market is a traditional market in Tân Định, Ho Chi Minh City Center, Vietnam. This is one of the oldest markets in the city.

== Location ==
Tân Định Market is located in a city block surrounded by four roads: Hai Bà Trưng, Nguyễn Hữu Cầu, Mã Lộ, Nguyễn Văn Nghĩa. The main entrance is located at its main address is 314–336 Hai Bà Trưng Street, Tân Định, Ho Chi Minh City.

== History ==
Initially, the market was named Phú Hòa Market (Vietnamese: Chợ Phú Hòa), As it was located within the territory of the former Phú Hòa village at that time. Later, the authorities incorporated the villages of Tân Định, Phú Hòa, and Nam Chơn from Gia Định province into the administrative boundaries of the Ville de Saigon, designating the area as Tân Định quartier (hộ; an administration existed during French Indochina); consequently, Phú Hòa Market was renamed Tân Định Market.

In 1926, the Council of Ville de Saigon has approved the construction of a new market at a cost of 110,000 piastre. The new Tân Định Market was designed and constructed by the French contractor Société Indochinoise d'Études et de Constructions (SIDEC). According to Les Annales Coloniales, the inauguration ceremony for the market was held on July 26, 1927, and was attended by top-ranking officials of the time, including the Governor of Cochinchina, the President of the Colonial Council, and the Mayor of Saigon.

Tân Định Market at that time was considered a market for the wealthy because the prices were usually higher than other markets. The goods were fresh, high-quality vegetables and meat, produced from Gia Định province. This place is also considered the largest and most affordable hub for trading fabric scraps in Saigon.

The front of the market stands out with its French-style architecture, featuring three bell towers—one in the center and two shorter on either side. During the 1950s and 1960s, there were parking areas for cars on both flanks of the market, while behind is the horse-drawn carriage stand (now is Mã Lộ Road, lit. 'Horse-drawn carriage Road'). (Note: Horse-drawn carriages were very common on the streets of Saigon at that time.)

== Market activities ==
=== Fabric & clothes shopping, tailoring ===
The clothing section sells casual garments for men, women and children. Most products are designed for everyday use rather than luxury shopping Shirts and T-shirts, Trousers and shorts, Dresses and skirts, Blouses, Pajamas and homewear, Children’s clothing, Socks, belts and ties, Handbags, purses and backpacks. Sizes may differ from international standards, foreign tourists are advised should try on clothes or check exact measurements before purchasing.

Fabrics are the market’s best-known specialty. Tân Định has long supplied materials to local tailors, fashion designers, costume makers and families preparing clothing for weddings, festivals and formal events. Common materials include: Silk and silk blends, Cotton, Linen, Lace, Brocade, Denim, Chiffon, Velvet, Corduroy, Embroidered fabric, Beaded and sequined material, etc. The market itself also has tailor houses inside it for custom clothes such as Áo dài, Western suit, etc.

In 2026, Vietnamese-style wooden clogs here are gaining popularity thanks to social networks like TikTok, many tourists not only shop but also enjoy watching artisans make wooden clogs and bring back clogs with a strong Vietnamese imprint.

=== Food court ===
The food court area around Nguyễn Hữu Cầu Street has long attracted local diners. Stalls serve breakfast, lunch, snacks and desserts, with opening hours varying considerably between vendors. Food stalls may change over time, so it is better to choose based on cleanliness, customer turnover and freshly prepared ingredients rather than relying entirely on one particular vendor.

=== Local market ===
Despite being a tourist attraction, Tân Định Market still consists being a market for local people featuring areas of: Dried food, spices and local ingredients, wet market, household goods and kitchenware, jewelry and small souvenirs.
