= Tân Định Church =

Church in Ho Chi Minh City, Vietnam

- Nhà thờ Thánh Tâm Chúa Giêsu; Giáo xứ Tân Định
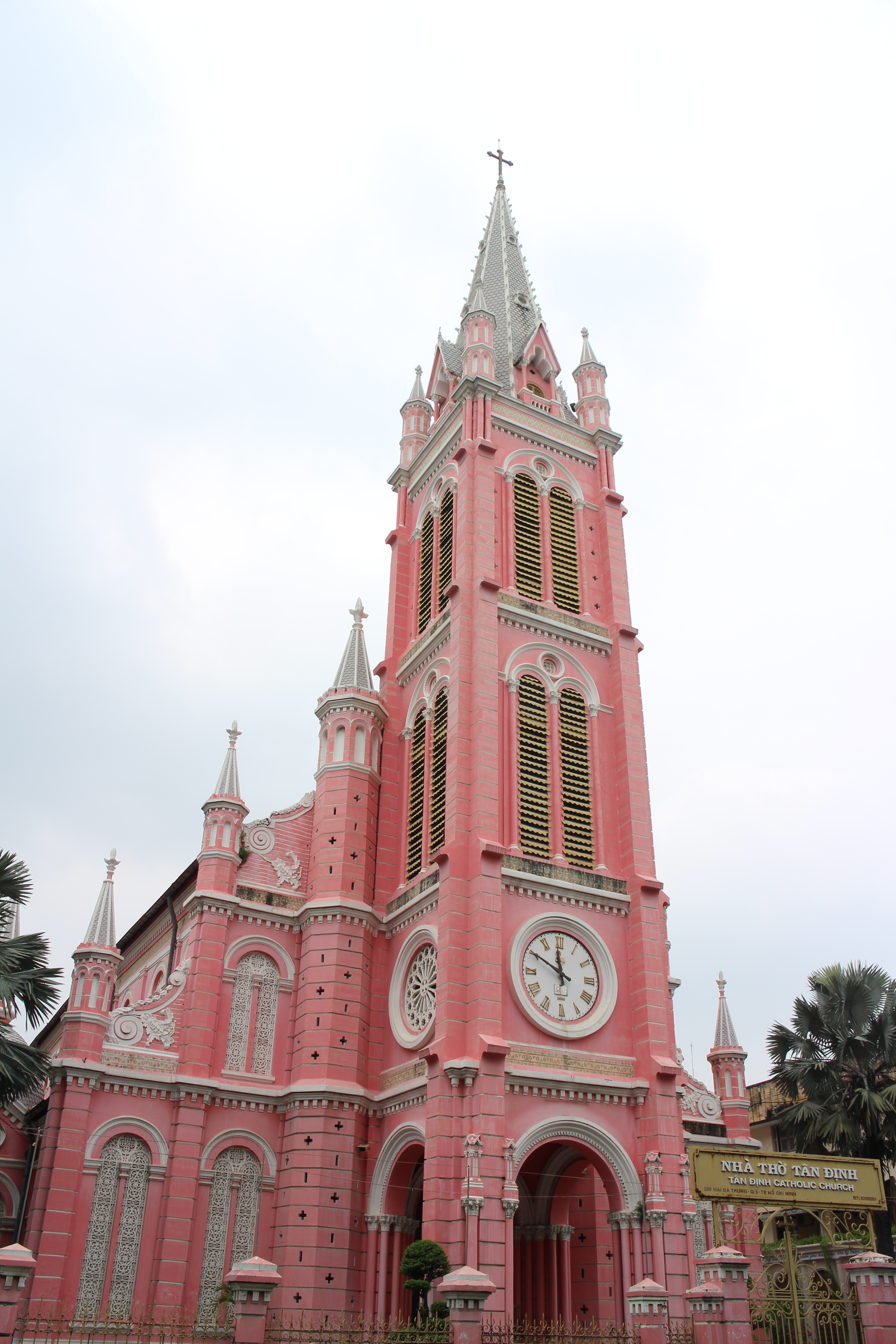

Religion
- Affiliation: Roman Catholic
- Diocese: Archdiocese of Ho Chi Minh City
- Province: Saigon
- Rite: Latinh

Location
- Location: Xuân Hòa, District 3, Ho Chi Minh City
- Country: Vietnam
- Interactive map of Tân Định Church
- Coordinates: 10°47′18″N 106°41′27″E

Architecture
- Style: Romanesque
- Founder: Donatien Éveillard
- Established: December 1876; 149 years ago
- Construction cost: 15000 French Indochina piastre, or 38000 franc
- Height (max): 52.6 metres (173 ft)

Website
- giaoxutandinh.net

Tân Định Church or Tân Định Parish Church (Vietnamese: Nhà thờ Tân Định, Giáo xứ Tân Định) is a Roman Catholic church in Ho Chi Minh City, Vietnam. Its formal name is the Church of the Sacred Heart of Jesus (Vietnamese: Nhà thờ Thánh Tâm Chúa Giêsu). Even though it is in District 3, the parish shares its name with neighbouring District 1's Tân Định ward as of Tân Định was the place name of a former village that the church was also included.

It was built during the French colonial period in the 1870s and completed on 16 December 1876, when Vietnam was part of French Indochina. The architecture is mainly neo-Romanesque, but it also has some neo-Gothic and neo-Renaissance elements. It has been painted pastel-pink both on the exterior and interior since 1957, earning it the nickname "the pink church" (Vietnamese: nhà thờ màu hồng).

It is the second-largest church in Ho Chi Minh City, after Notre-Dame Basilica in District 1. They both belong to the Archdiocese of Ho Chi Minh City but different deanery when Tân Định Church is belong to the same name deanery while the Notre-Dame Basilica is Sài Gòn – Chợ Quán. Tân Định Church is not a cathedral; Notre-Dame is the cathedral (seat) of this metropolitan archdiocese.

The address of the church is 289 Hai Bà Trưng Street, Ward 8, District 3 (now is Xuân Hòa Ward), Ho Chi Minh City.

== Transport ==
Line 4 of HCMC Metro was planned, which a section of it run underground of Hai Bà trưng Street and its closest station to the church is initially named as Le Van Tam Park station.

== Gallery ==
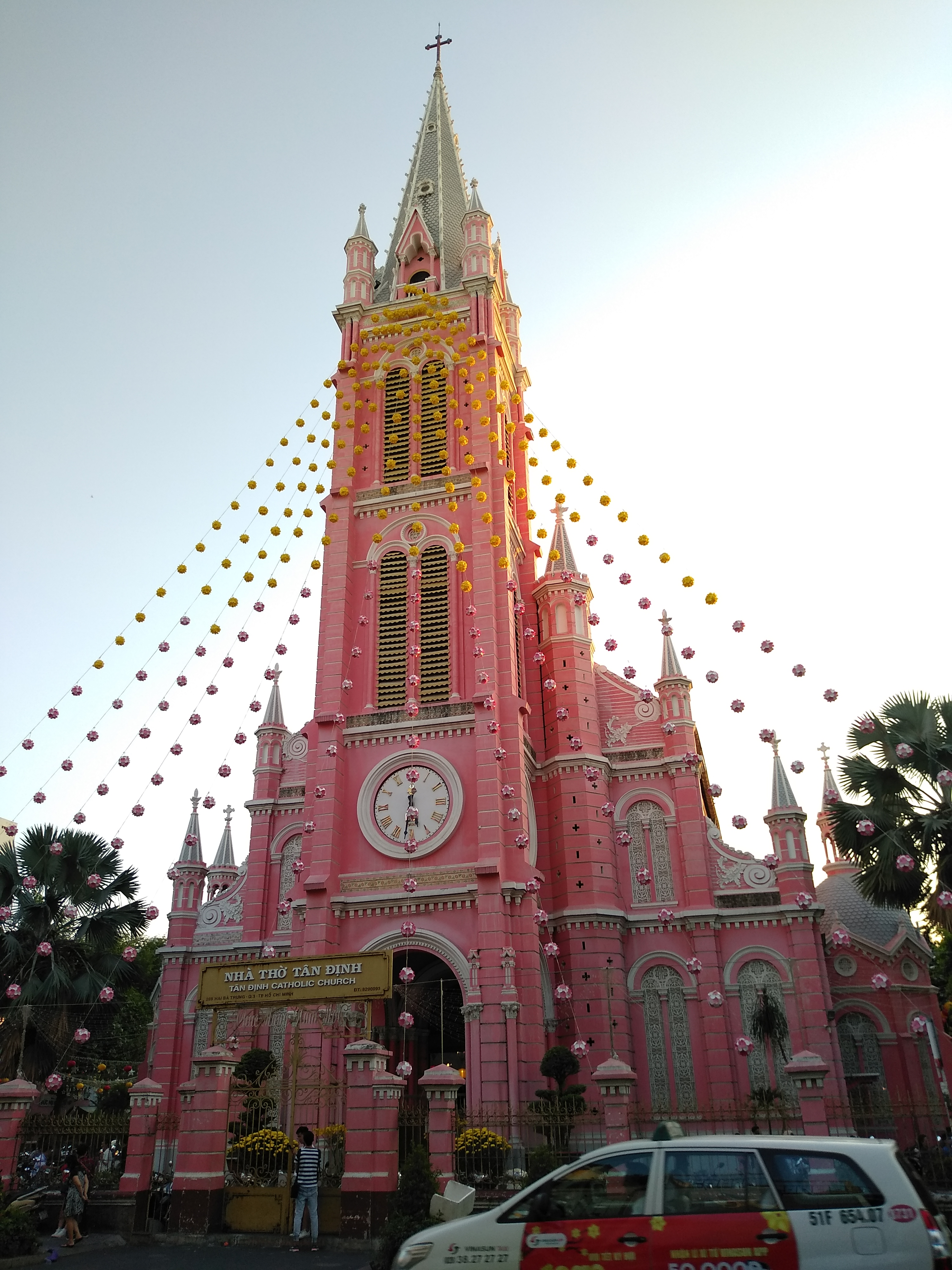
Tân Định Church being decorated

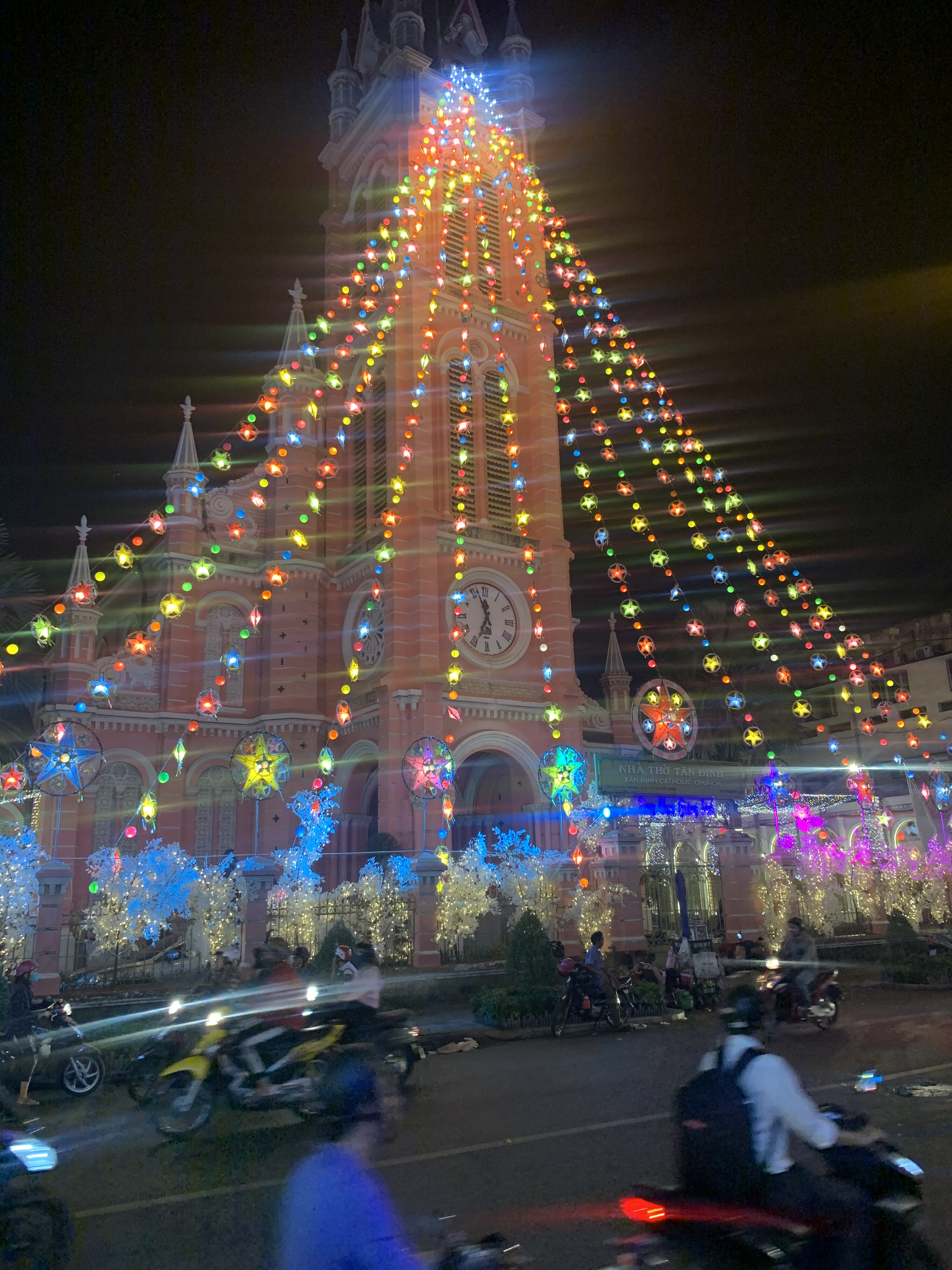
Tân Định Church at night

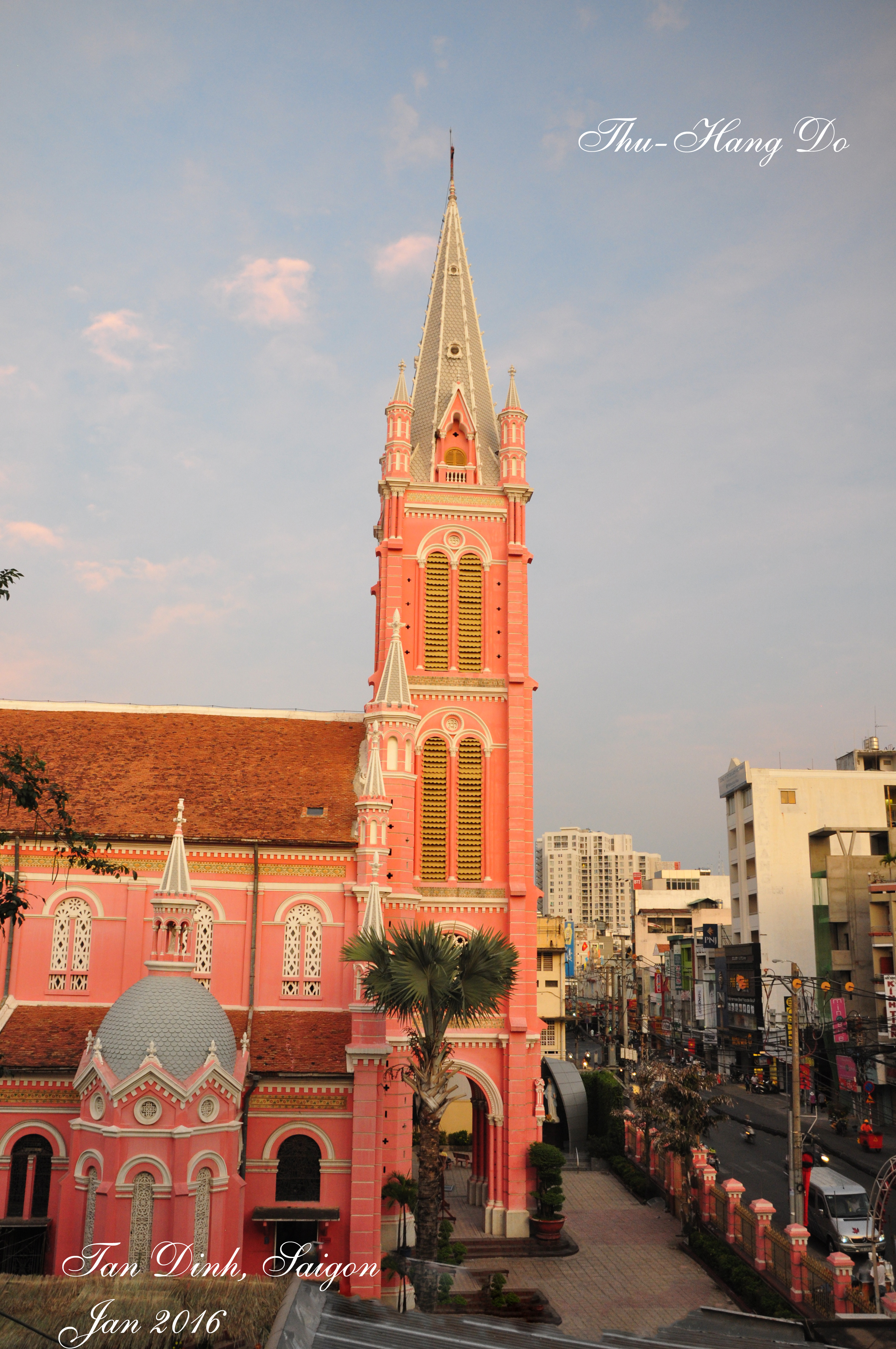
Tân Định Church, view towards Kiệu Bridge

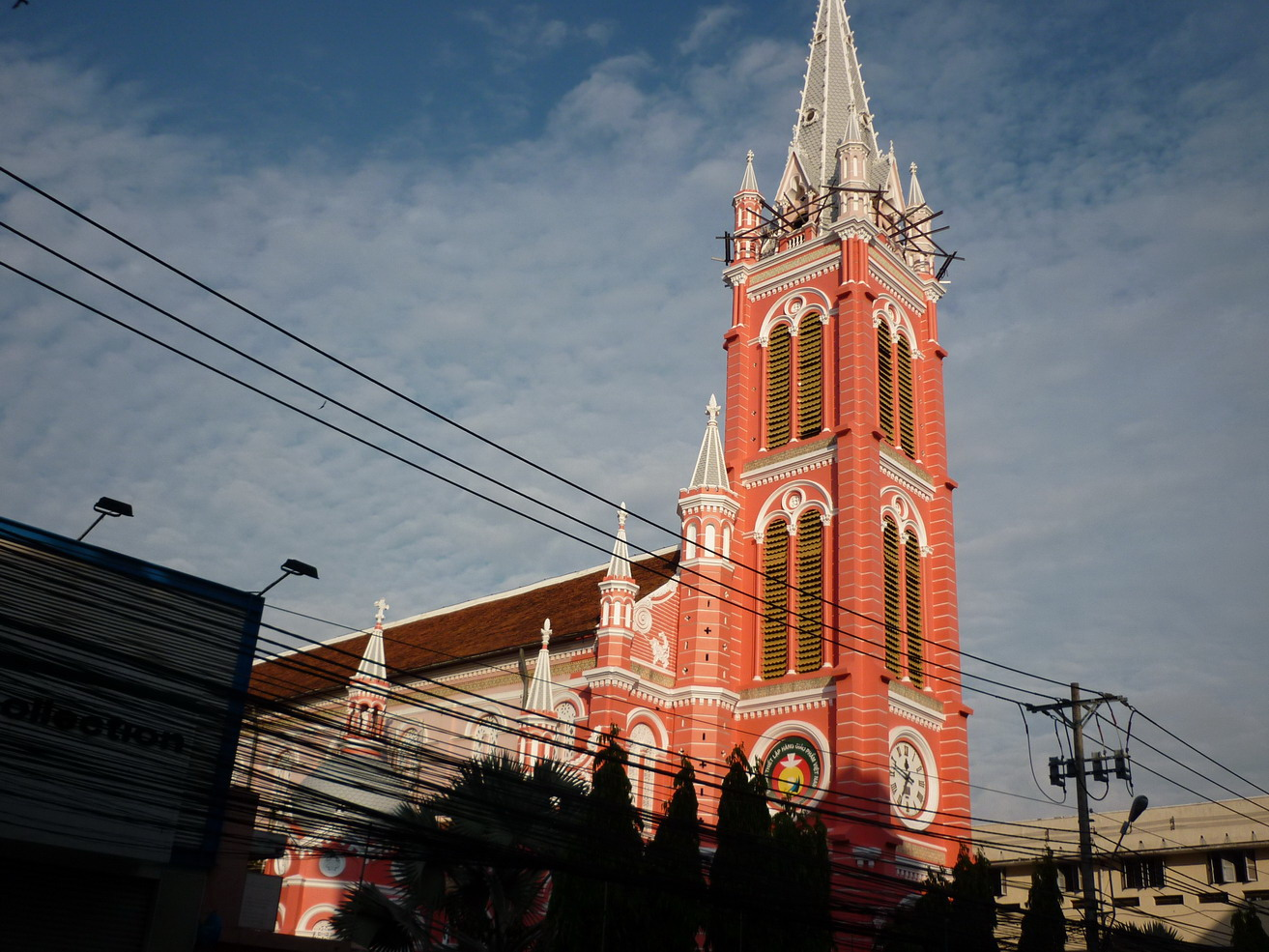

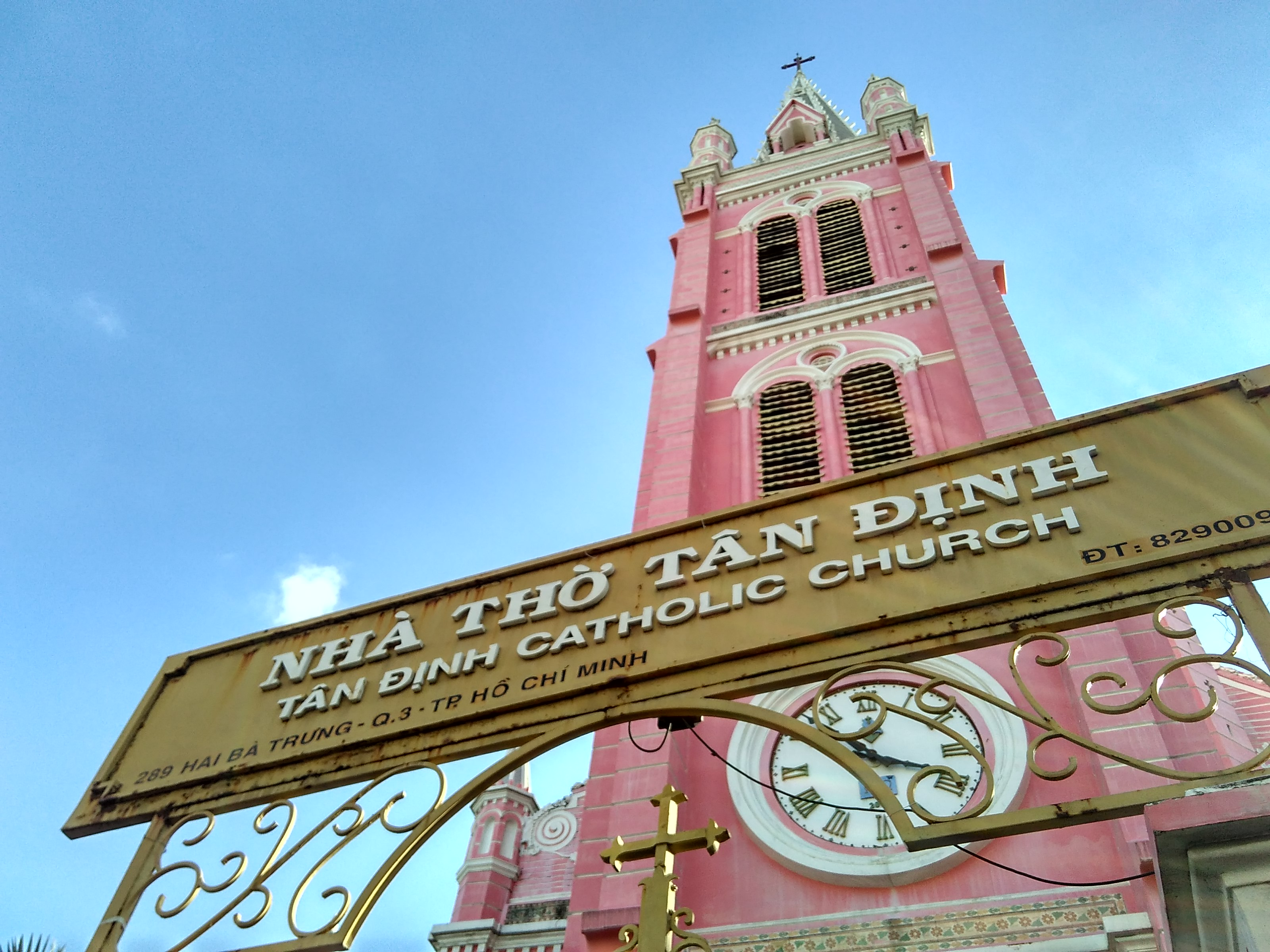
Tân Định Catholic Church sign

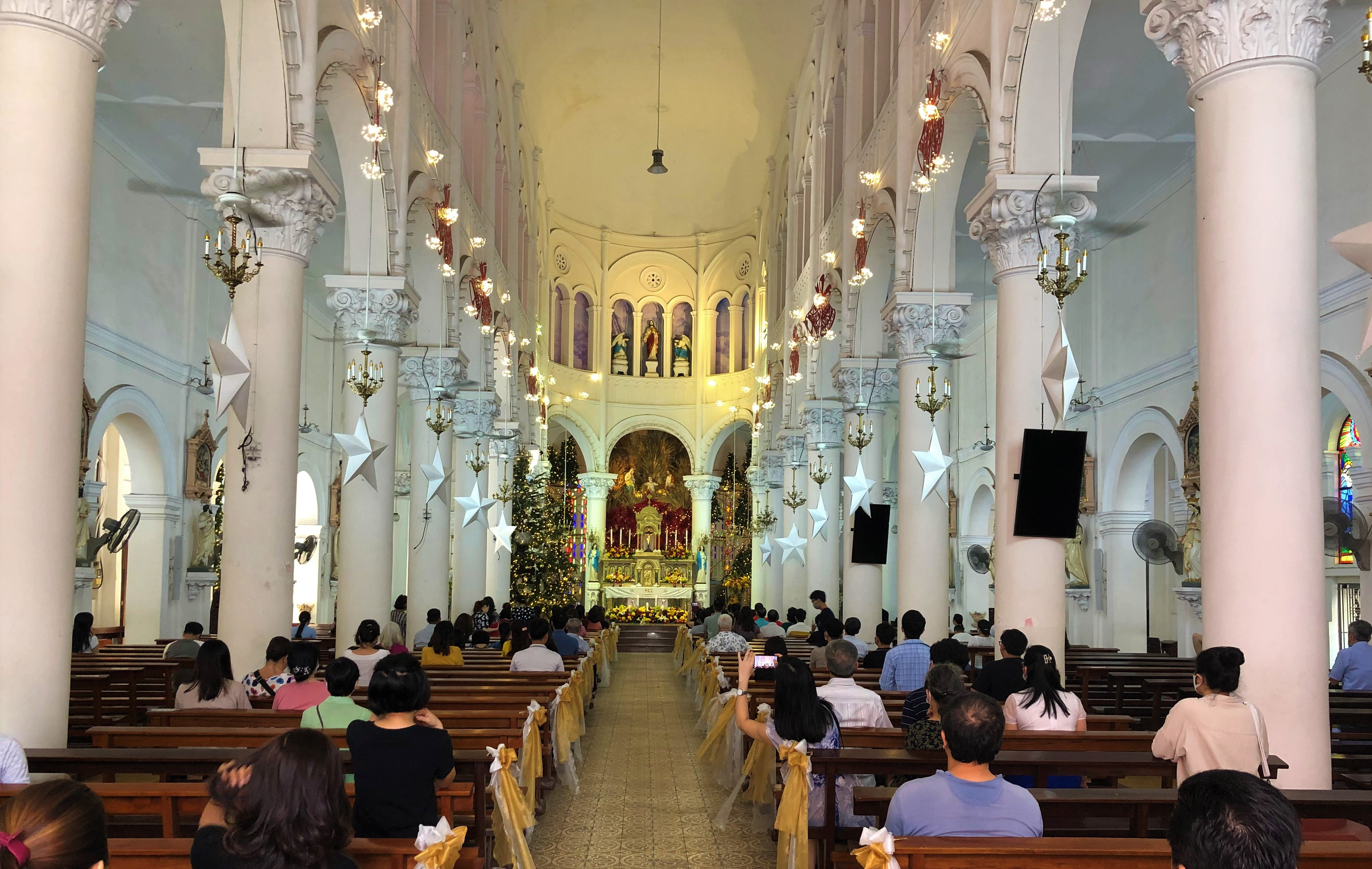
Interior of Tân Định Church

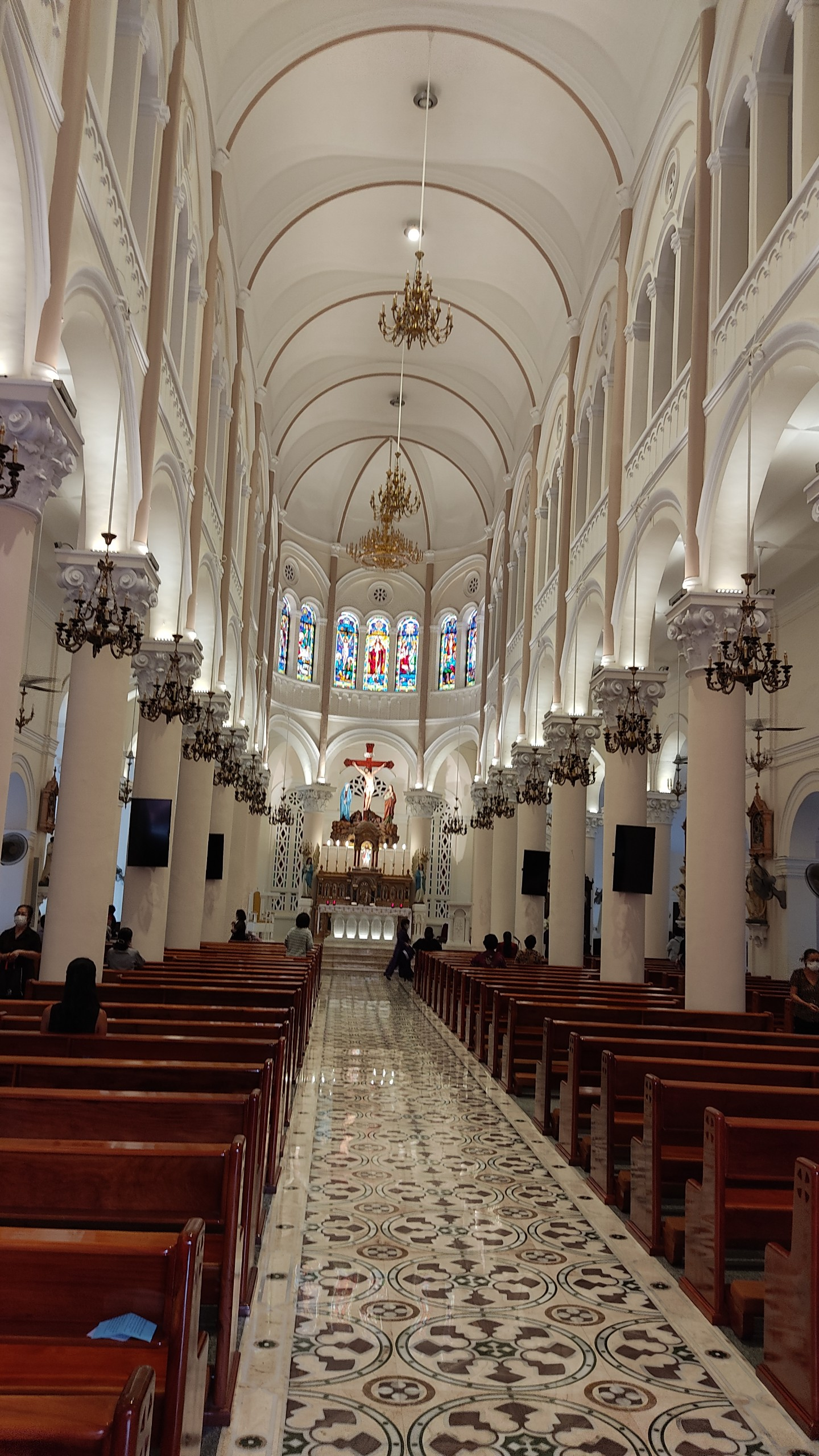

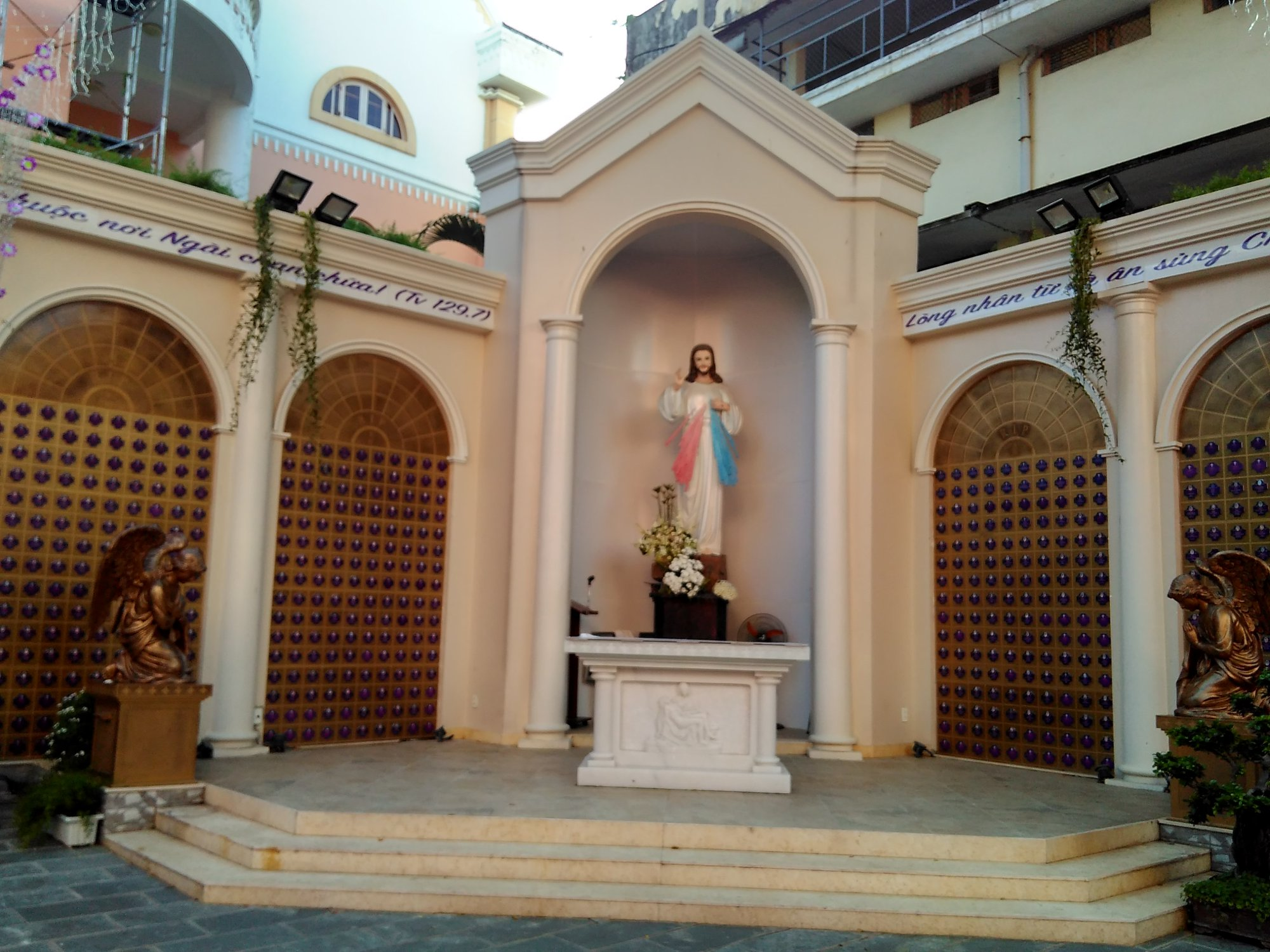
