= UEH-International School of Business =

School in Ho Chi Minh City, Vietnam

UEH-International School of Business (UEH-ISB)
- Viện Đào tạo Quốc tế - Đại học Kinh té Thành phố Hồ Chí Minh
- Type: Public
- Established: 2010
- President: Prof.Dr. Tran Ha Minh Quan
- Students: 2,455
- Undergraduates: 1,847
- Postgraduates: 608
- Location: 17 Phạm Ngọc Thạch Street, Xuân Hòa, Ho Chi Minh City, Vietnam
- Campus: Urban
- Website: www.isb.edu.vn
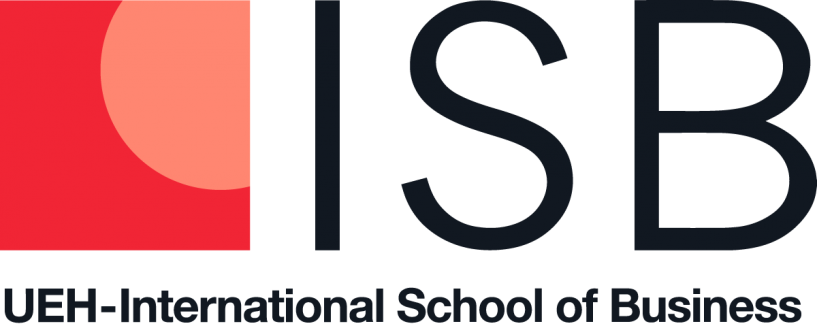

As a part of the University of Economics Ho Chi Minh City (UEH), the UEH-International School of Business (UEH-ISB) (in Vietnamese: Viện ISB) was established in 2010.

UEH-ISB offers undergraduate and postgraduate programs taught completely in English and follow an international academic format. UEH-ISB has a strong partnership with Western Sydney University, Australia, as well as associations with Victoria University, Australia, UQAM and the University of Houston–Clear Lake.

The EMBA program at UEH-ISB, run as a partnership through Université du Québec à Montréal (UQÀM), is currently ranked 283 among business schools in the world.

== History ==
The UEH-International School of Business (UEH-ISB), was founded in 2010 by President Dr. Nguyen Dong Phong and Vice President Dr. Tran Ha Minh Quan in Ho Chi Minh City, Vietnam. The school was founded as a partnership with Western Sydney University, Australia. Students graduating from UEH-ISB's bachelor and masters programs of study receive a joint degree from UEH and from the partnership university.

UEH-ISB's faculty includes professors from America, Australia, Malaysia, Singapore, New Zealand, England, and Poland, among other countries.

== Campuses and facilities ==
UEH-International School of Business has currently five campuses, located at the center of Ho Chi Minh City.

- Campus A: 59C Nguyễn Đình Chiểu Street, Xuân Hoà Ward (District 3, Ho Chi Minh City)
- Campus I: 17 Phạm Ngọc Thạch Street, Xuân Hòa Ward (District 3, Ho Chi Minh City)
- Campus V: 41-43 Võ Văn Tẩn Street, Xuân Hòa Ward (District 3, Ho Chi Minh City)
- Campus D: 196 Trần Quang Khải Street, Tân Định Ward (District 1, Ho Chi Minh City)
- Campus B: 279 Nguyễn Tri Phương Boulevard, Diên Hồng Ward (District 10, Ho Chi Minh City)

== Student life ==
There are a number of clubs run through UEH-ISB's main downtown Ho Chi Minh City campus, including a local chapter of Toastmasters International.
