= International School of Bucharest =

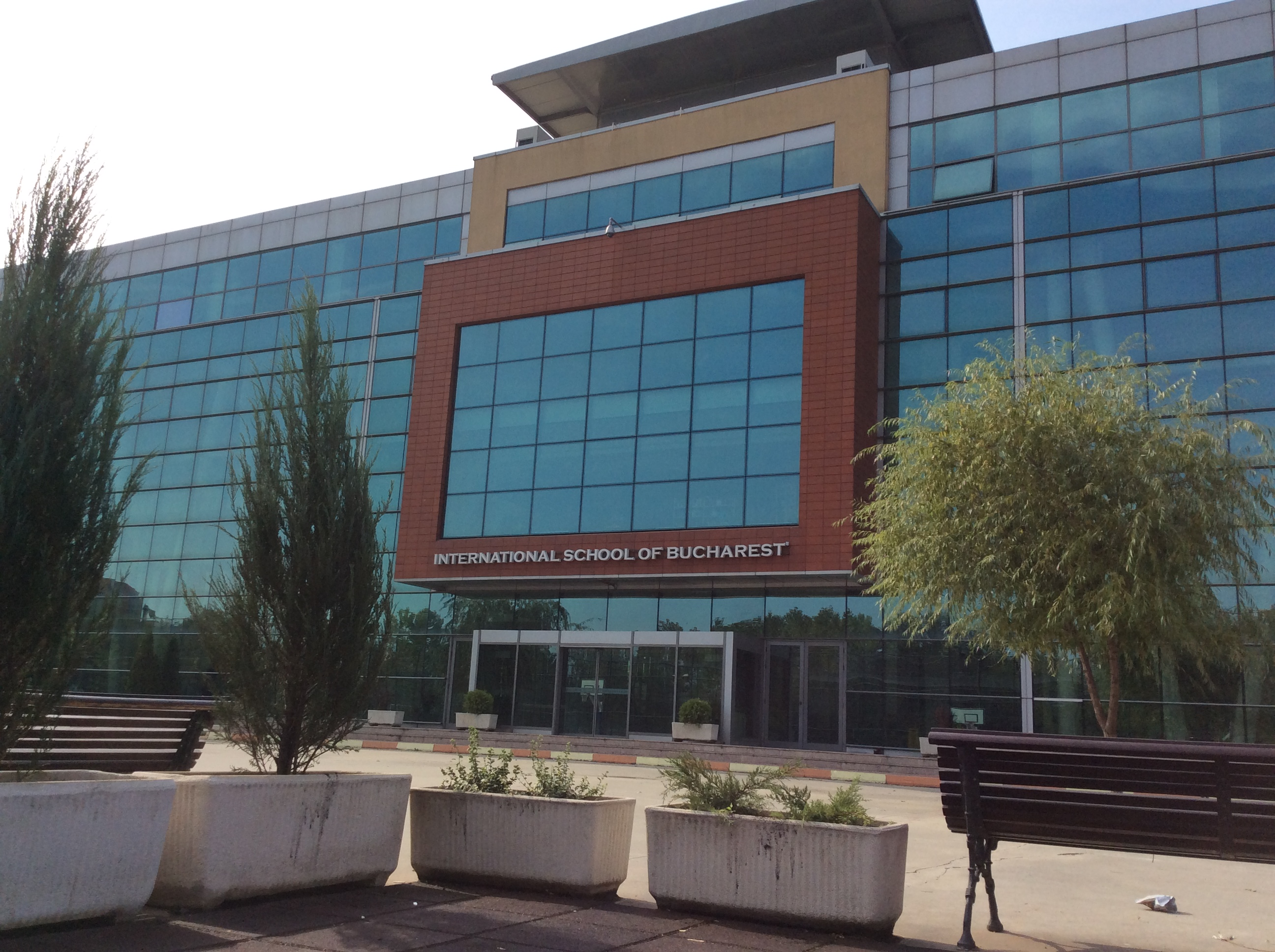
- ISB Campus

Location
- Șoseaua Gării Cățelu, Nr. 1R, Sector 3 Bucharest, 032991; Romania
- Coordinates: 44.430943°N 26.215410°E

Information
- Other name: ISB
- Type: Private international school
- Motto: HERO (Honesty, Empathy, Responsibility, Open-Mindedness)
- Established: 1996
- Director: Serdar Sakman (de facto) Oytun Pekel (Head Of Secondary) Mustafa Soydemir (Head Of Primary)
- Age range: 2.5–19
- Colors: Green and Blue
- Affiliation: Council of British International Schools
- Website: isb.ro

International School of Bucharest (ISB) is a private international school founded in 1996 that offers a British style of education for students from the age of 2.5 to 19, located at 1R Șoseaua Gării Cățelu in Bucharest, Romania's capital city. It caters to over 700 students from 40 countries.

== Education ==
Children in the Early Years, Primary (Key Stages 1 and 2) and Secondary school (Key Stage 3) follow the National Curriculum of England and Wales, supplemented with the Cambridge Primary and Secondary 1 Curriculum for the core subjects English, Maths and Science. Year 12 and 13 are the final two years where students are prepared for International Baccalaureate. Years 10 and 11 follow the Cambridge IGCSE.

ISB has been registered by the University of Cambridge as a 'Cambridge International Examinations' center since 2001 and accredited by the Council of International Schools (CIS) since August 2012. ISB has been a member of COBIS since October 2013.
