= Tân Định =

Tân Định Phường Tân Định Đa Kao, Phú Hòa, Hòa Mỹ
- Ward
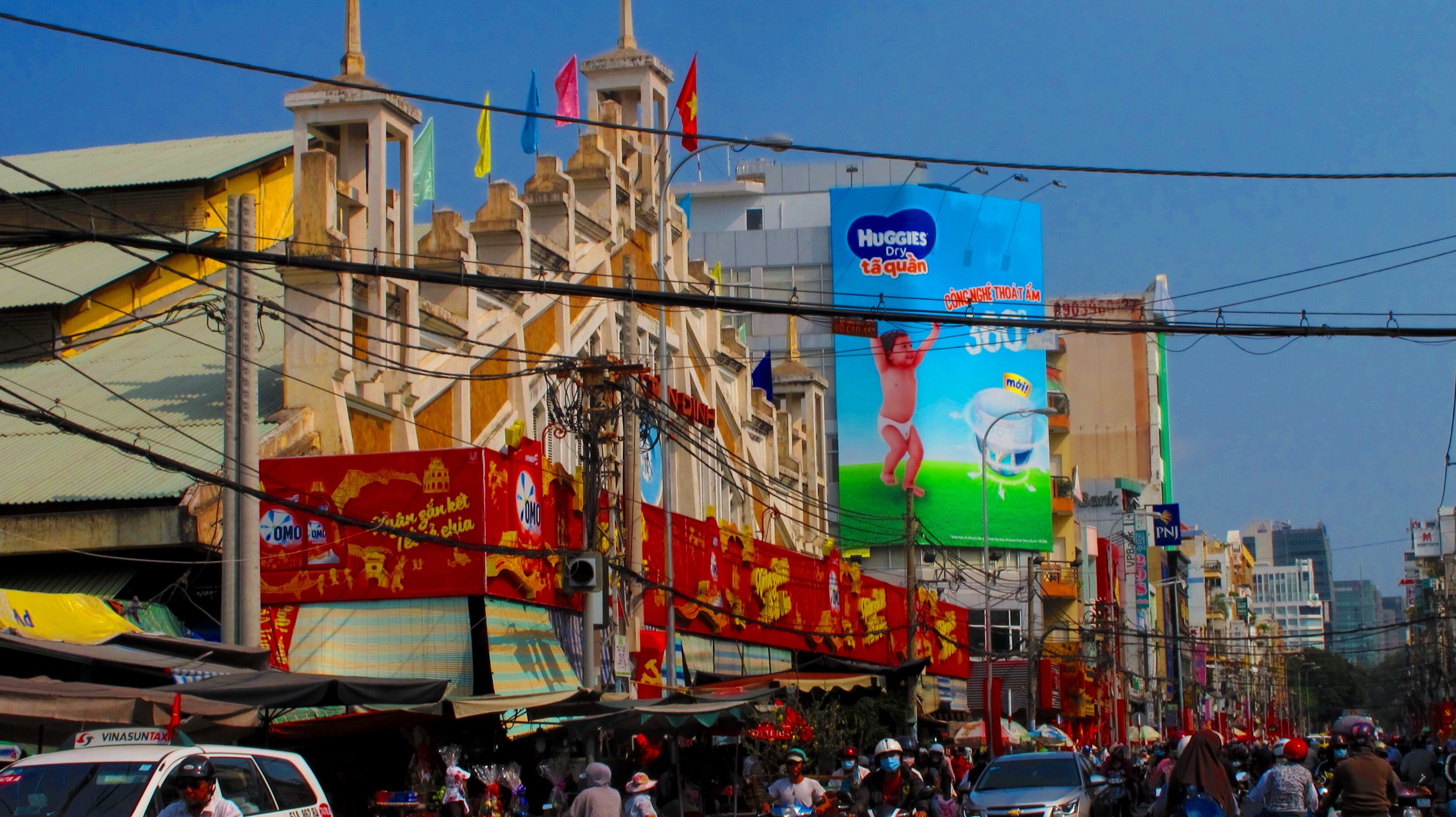
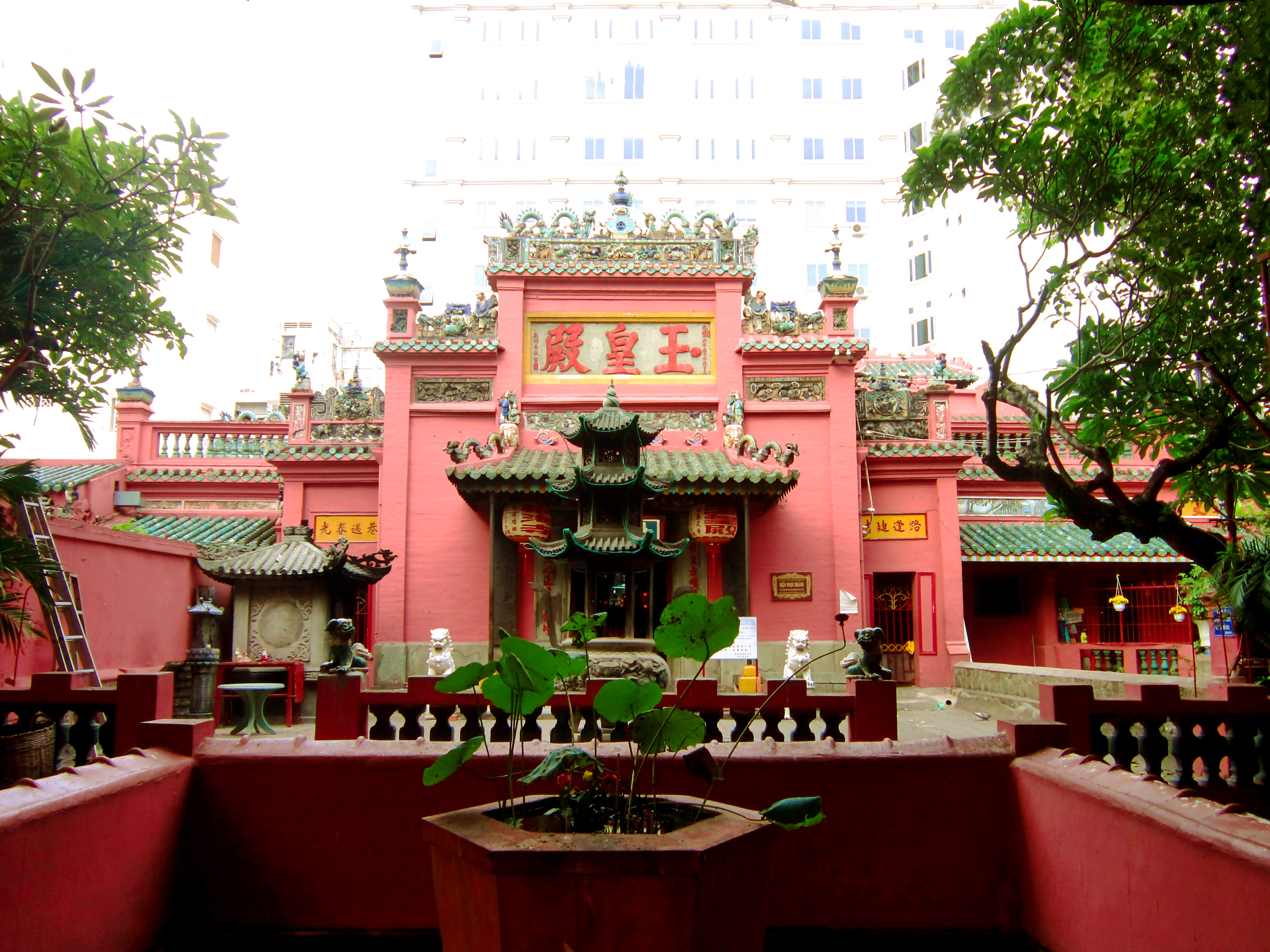
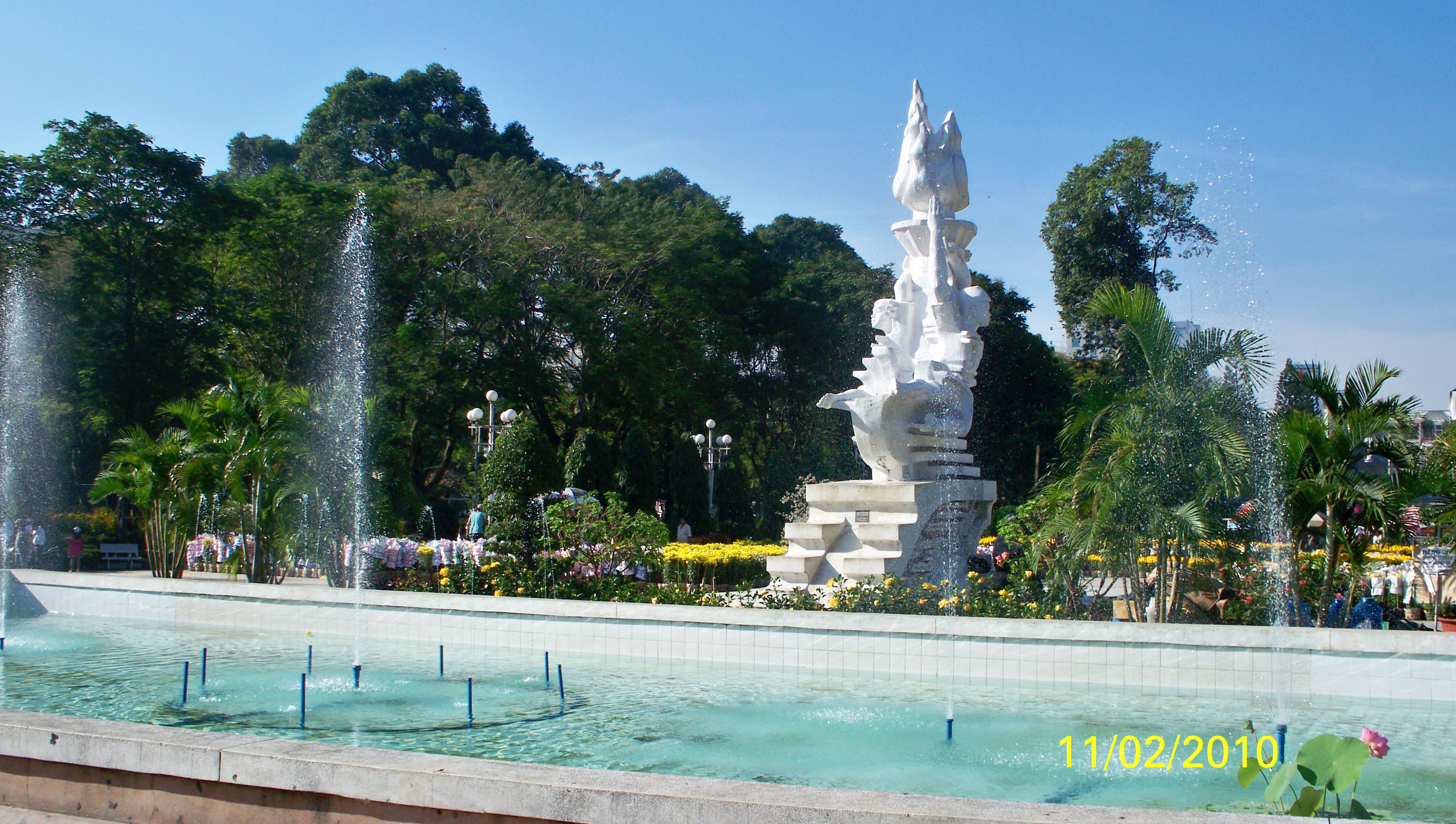
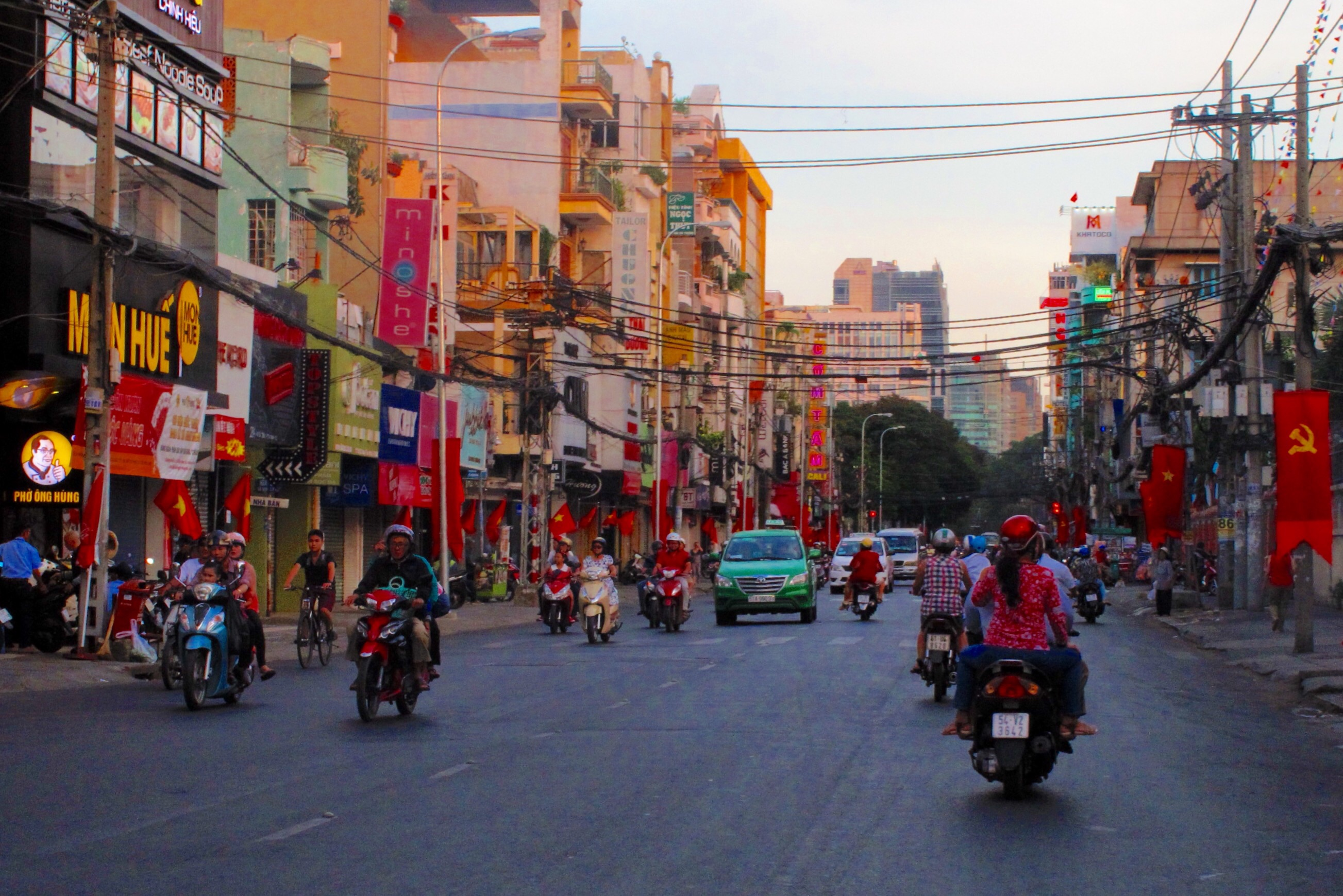
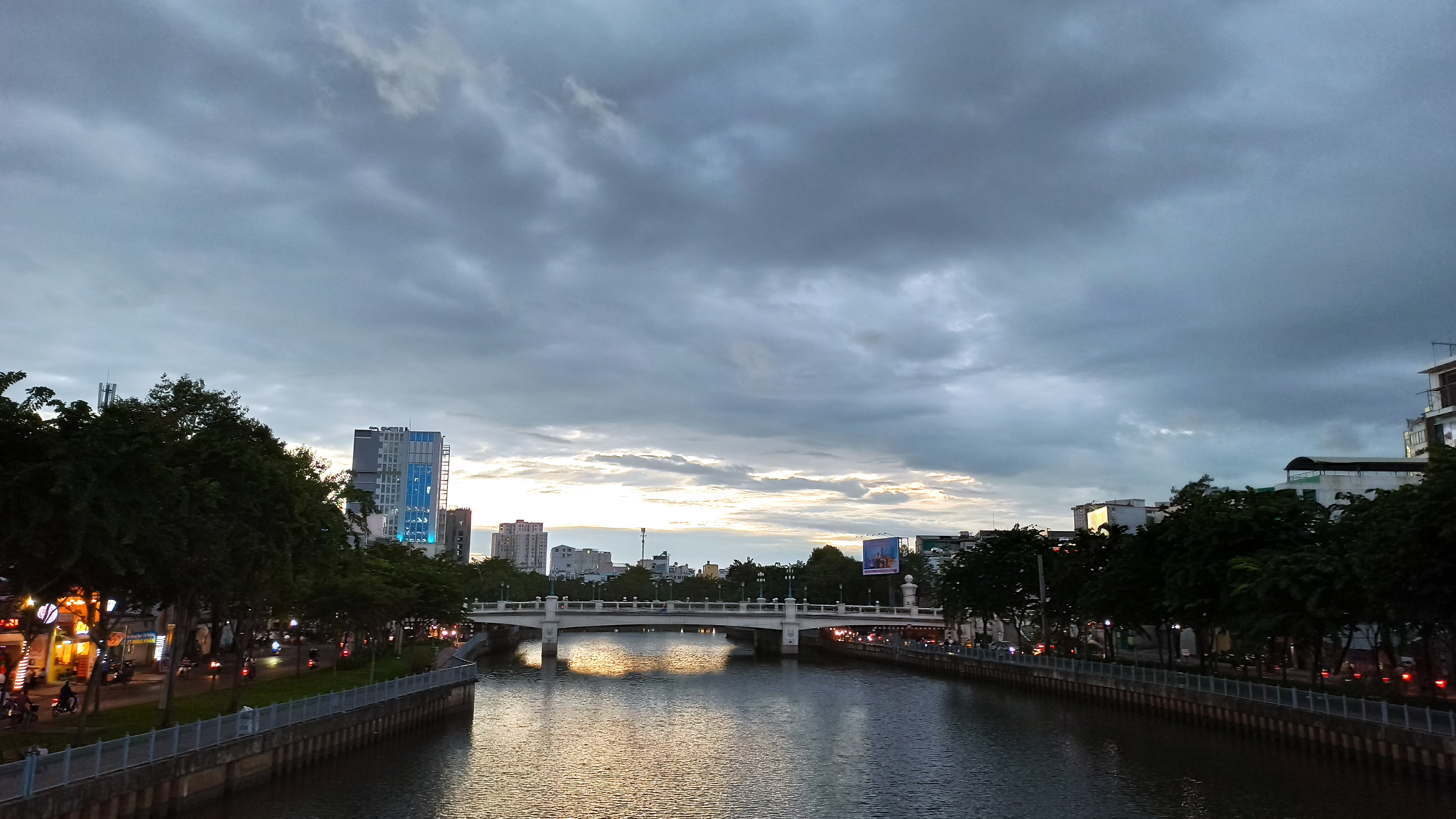
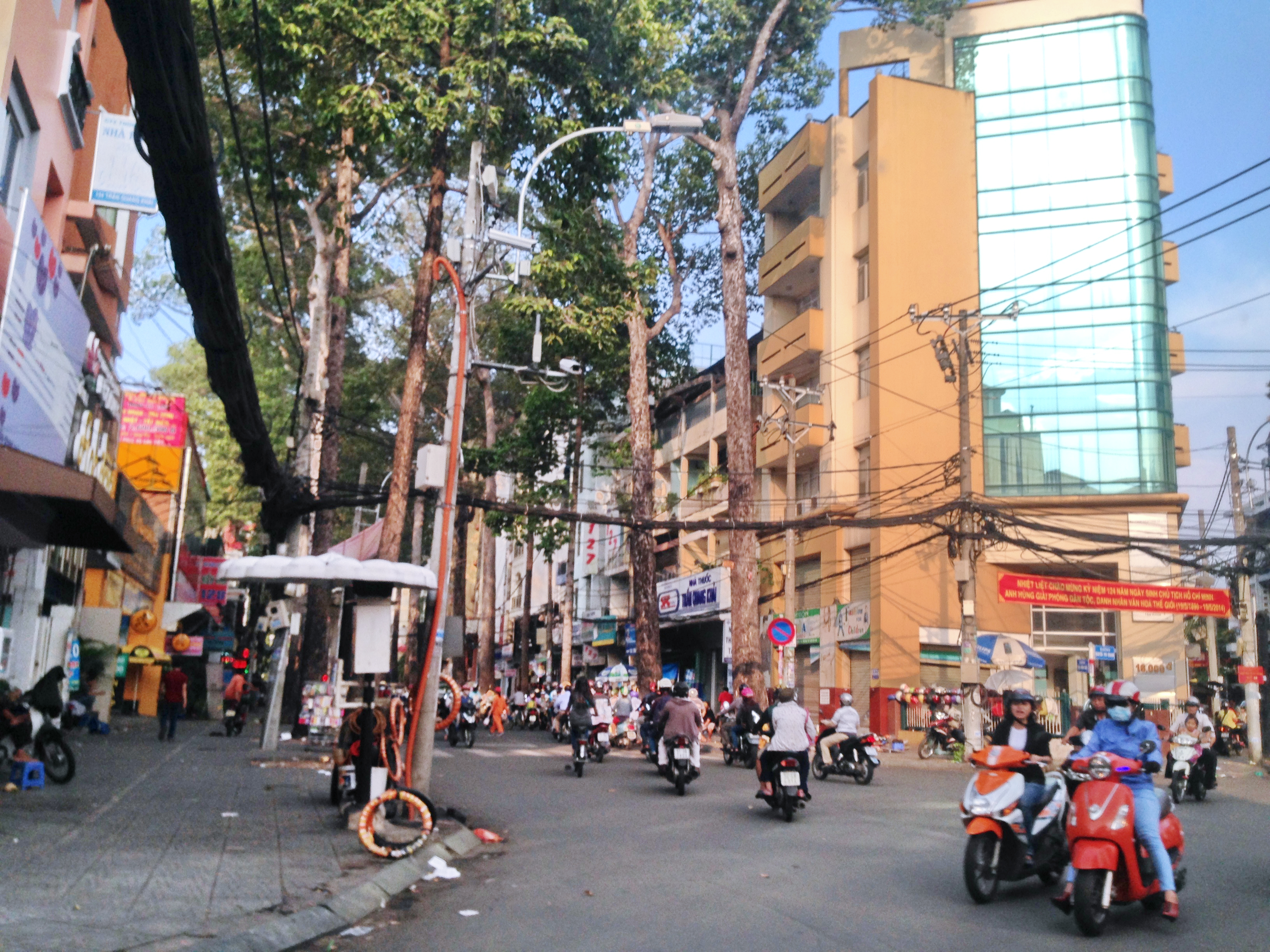
- From top to bottom: Tân Định Market in Tết 2015, Jade Emperor Pagoda, Lê Văn Tám Park, Hai Bà Trưng Street in the ward, Đa Kao Roundabout, Bông Bridge viewed from Bùi Hữu Nghĩa Bridge on Nhiêu Lộc – Thị Nghè Channel, Trần Quang Khải Street

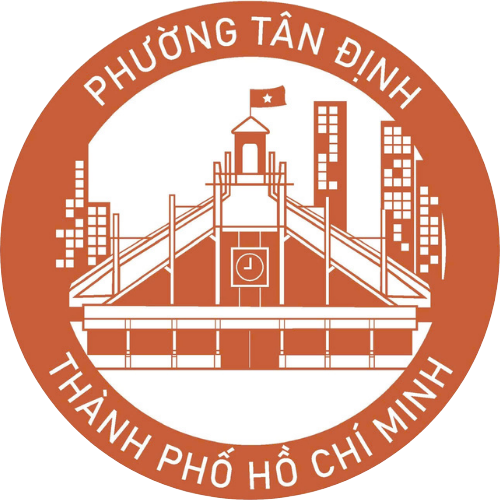
- Seal
- Interactive map of Tân Định
- Coordinates: 10°47′32″N 106°41′26″E
- Country: Vietnam
- Municipality: Ho Chi Minh City
- Established: June 16, 2025

Area
  - Total: 0.47 sq mi (1.23 km^{2})

Population (2024)
  - Total: 48,524
  - Density: 102,000/sq mi (39,500/km^{2})
- Time zone: UTC+07:00 (Indochina Time)
- Administrative code: 26737

Tân Định (Vietnamese: Phường Tân Định) is a ward of Ho Chi Minh City, Vietnam. It is one of the 168 new wards, communes and special zones of the city following the reorganization in 2025.

== Geography ==
Tân Định ward located in the city center, borders to:

- Saigon ward to the east by Nguyễn Thị Minh Khai Street
- Xuân Hòa ward to the southwest by Hai Bà Trưng Street
- Cầu Kiệu ward to the northwest by Nhiêu Lộc–Thị Nghè Canal
- Gia Định ward to the north by Nhiêu Lộc – Thị Nghè Canal.

According to Official Dispatch No. 2896/BNV-CQĐP dated May 27, 2025 of the Ministry of Home Affairs, following the merger, Tân Định has a land area of 1.23 km², the population as of December 31, 2024 is 48,524 people, the population density is 39,450 people/km².

== History ==
On June 16, 2025, the Standing Committee of the National Assembly issued Resolution No. 1685/NQ-UBTVQH15 on the arrangement of commune-level administrative units of Ho Chi Minh City in 2025 (effective from June 16, 2025). Accordingly, the entire area and population of Tân Định ward, along with part of the natural area and population size of Đa Kao ward of District 1, Ho Chi Minh City after the rearrangement under Clause 1, Article 1, are reorganized to form a new ward named Tân Định directly under Ho Chi Minh City.

== Administration ==
In 2025, Tân Định ward was divided into 20 quarters, numbered from 1 to 20 with the first 14 quarters are original quarters of Tân Định ward, while last six are of former Đa Kao ward.

From 2026, Tân Định ward reduced its quarters to 15 and still numerical in order from 1 to 15 with first ten are former Tân Định and last five are former Đa Kao.

== Healthcare ==
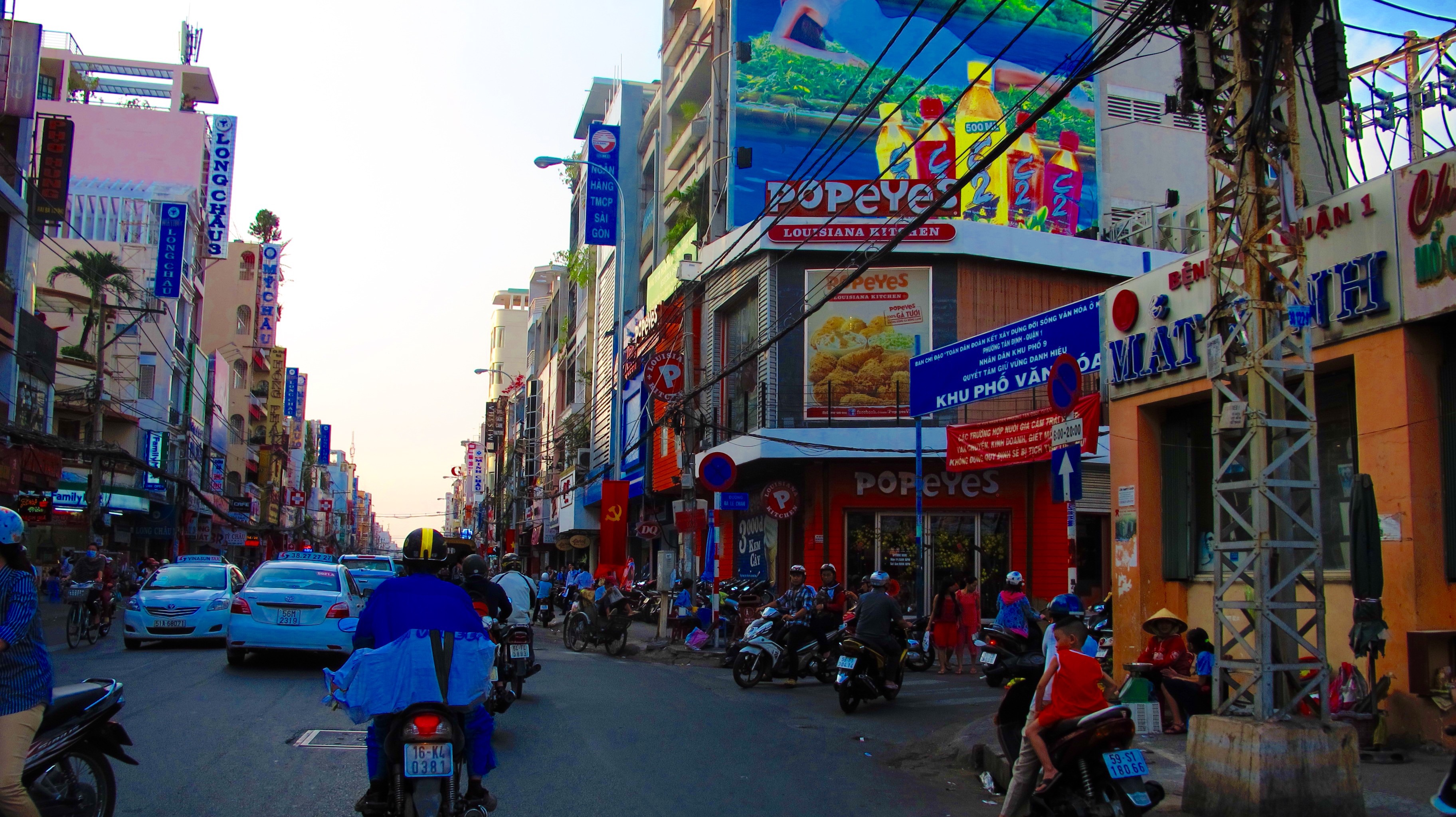
Glimpse of Tân Định General Hospital (then known as District 1 Hospital) on corner streets of Hai Bà Trưng and Bà Lê Chân

- Tân Định General Hospital (formerly District 1 Hospital and Đông Hà Maternity Hospital, Nhà Bảo sanh Đông Hà)

== University ==
- UEH-International School of Business, Campus D

== Consulates ==
Consulate General of Kuwait	24 Phùng Khắc Khoan (formerly in Đa Kao)
Consulate General of Cambodia	41 Phùng Khắc Khoan (formerly in Đa Kao)
Consulate General of Cuba	45 Phùng Khắc Khoan (formerly in Đa Kao)

== Tourism and attractions ==
Tân Định was listed as 12 out of 40 collest neighborhoods in the world in 2026 by Time Out.

=== Gallery ===
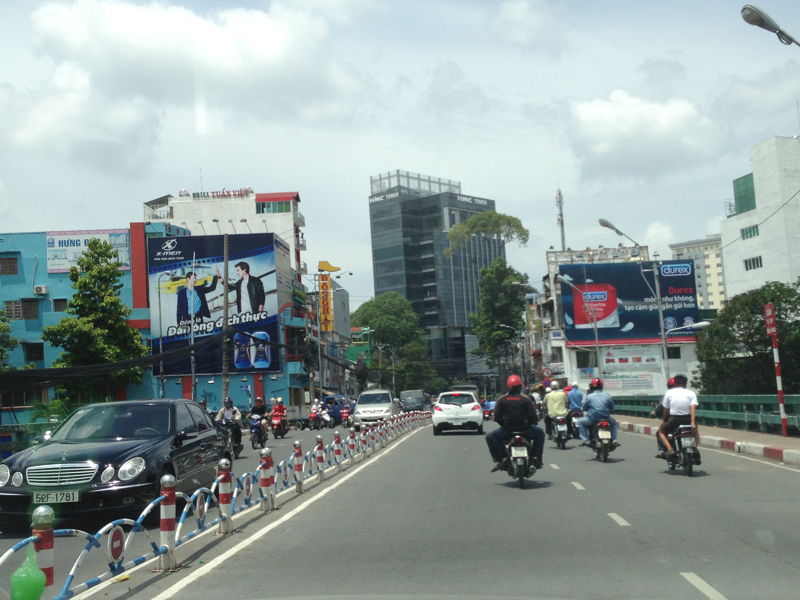
Bông Bridge with HMC Tower in the back on Đinh Tiên Hoàng Street

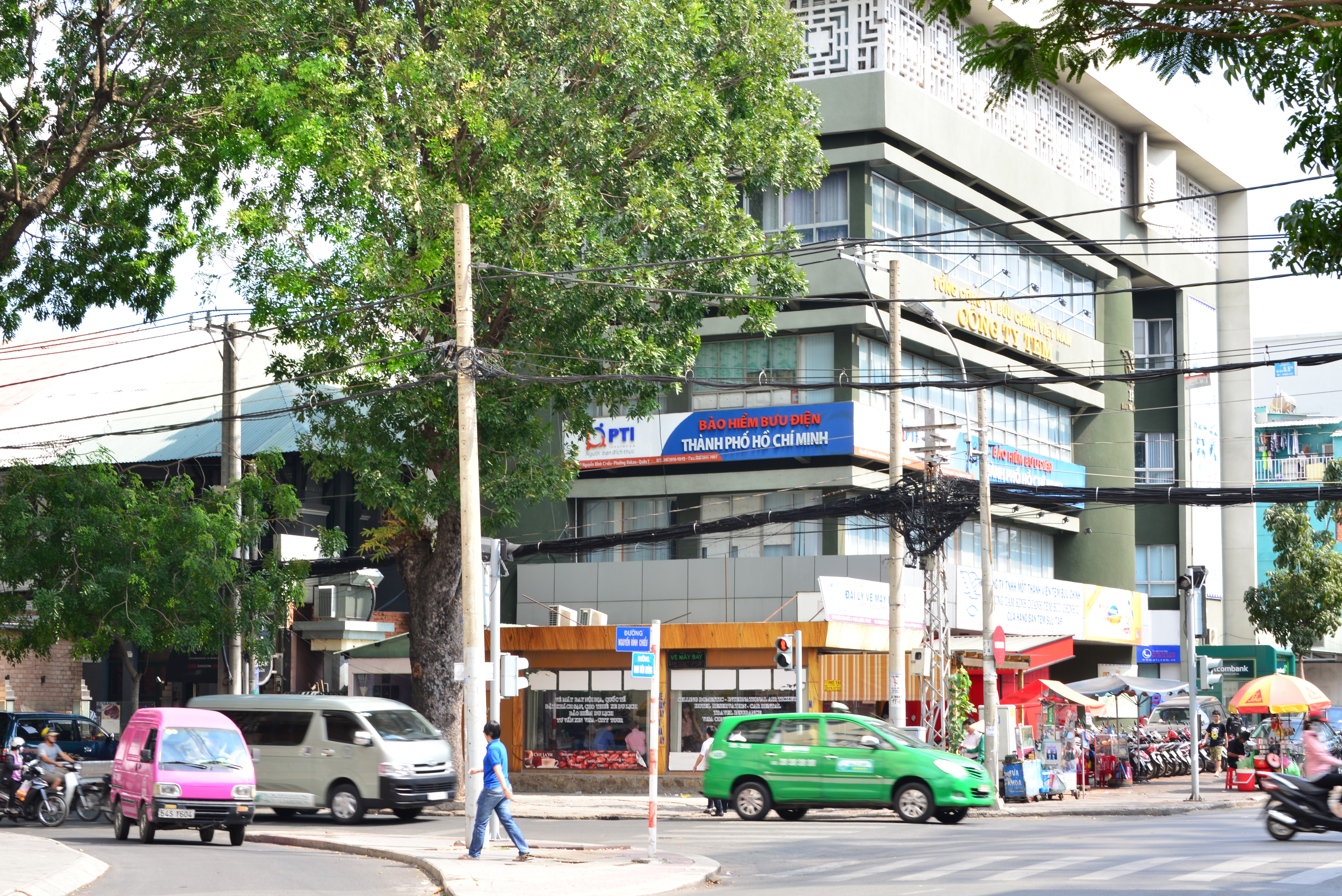
TEM Building of Vietnam Stamp Company

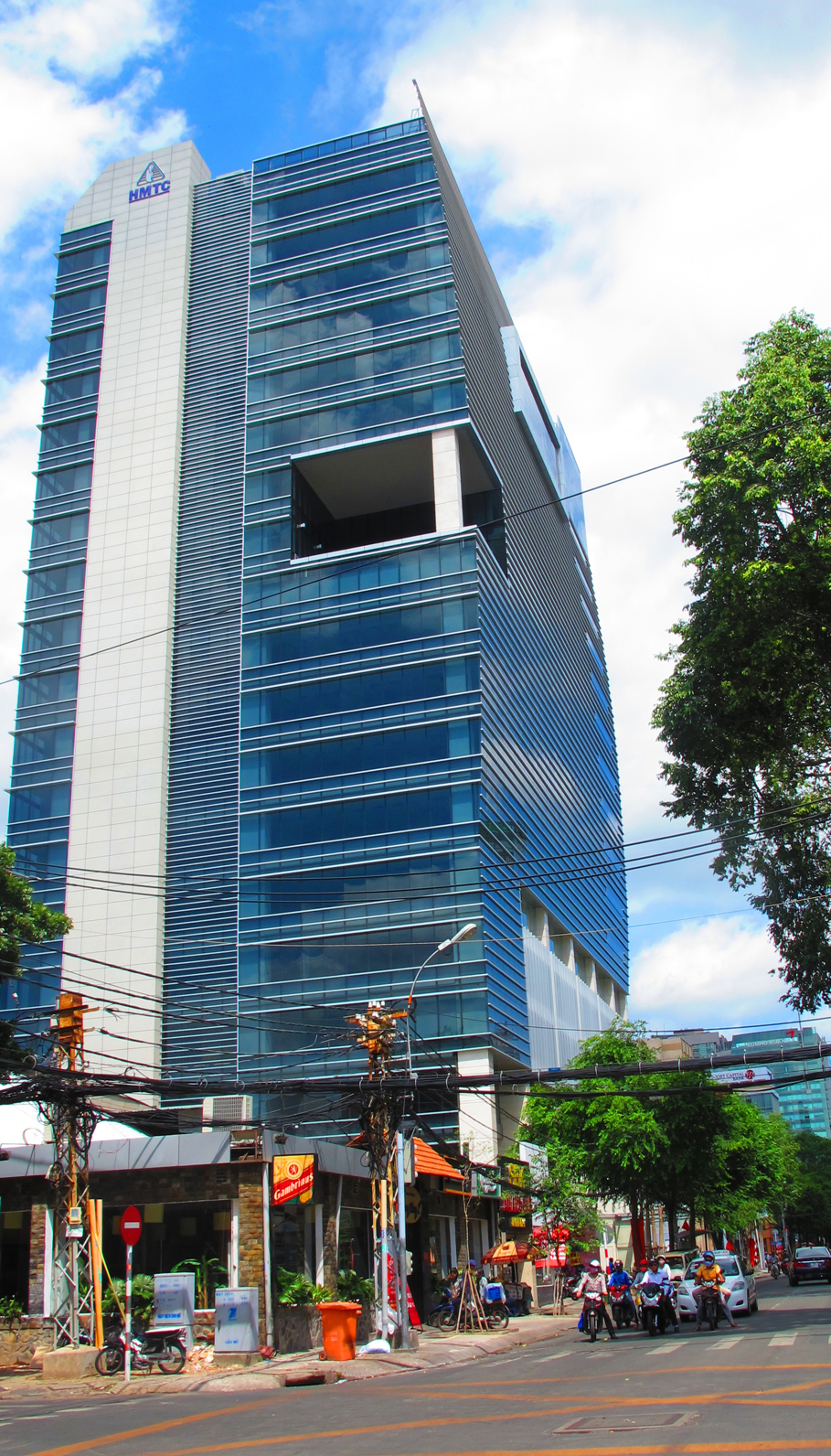
Empress Tower, 138-140-142 Hai Bà Trưng Street

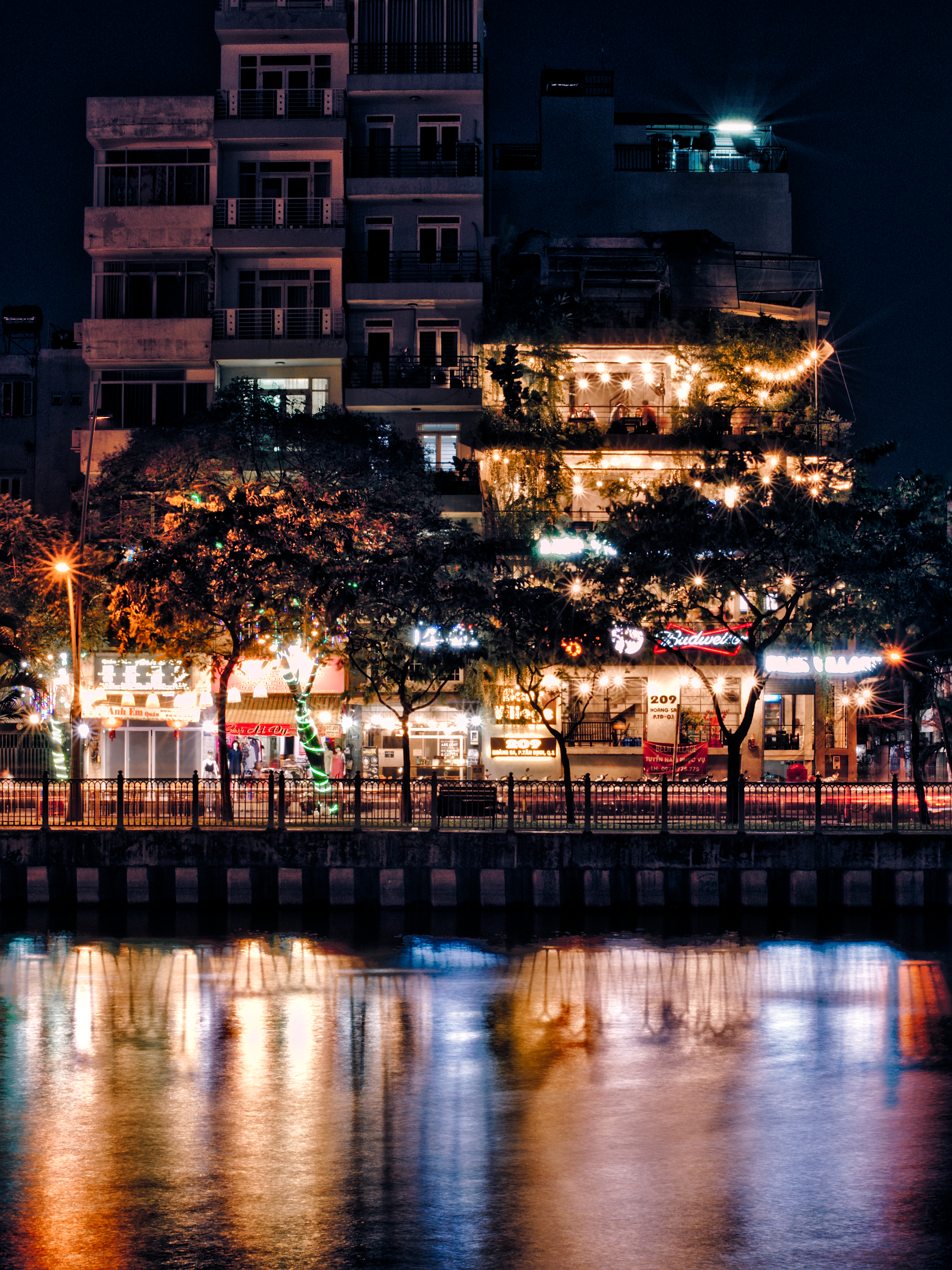
Hoàng Sa Street, Nhiêu Lộc–Thị Nghè canalside street in Tân Định

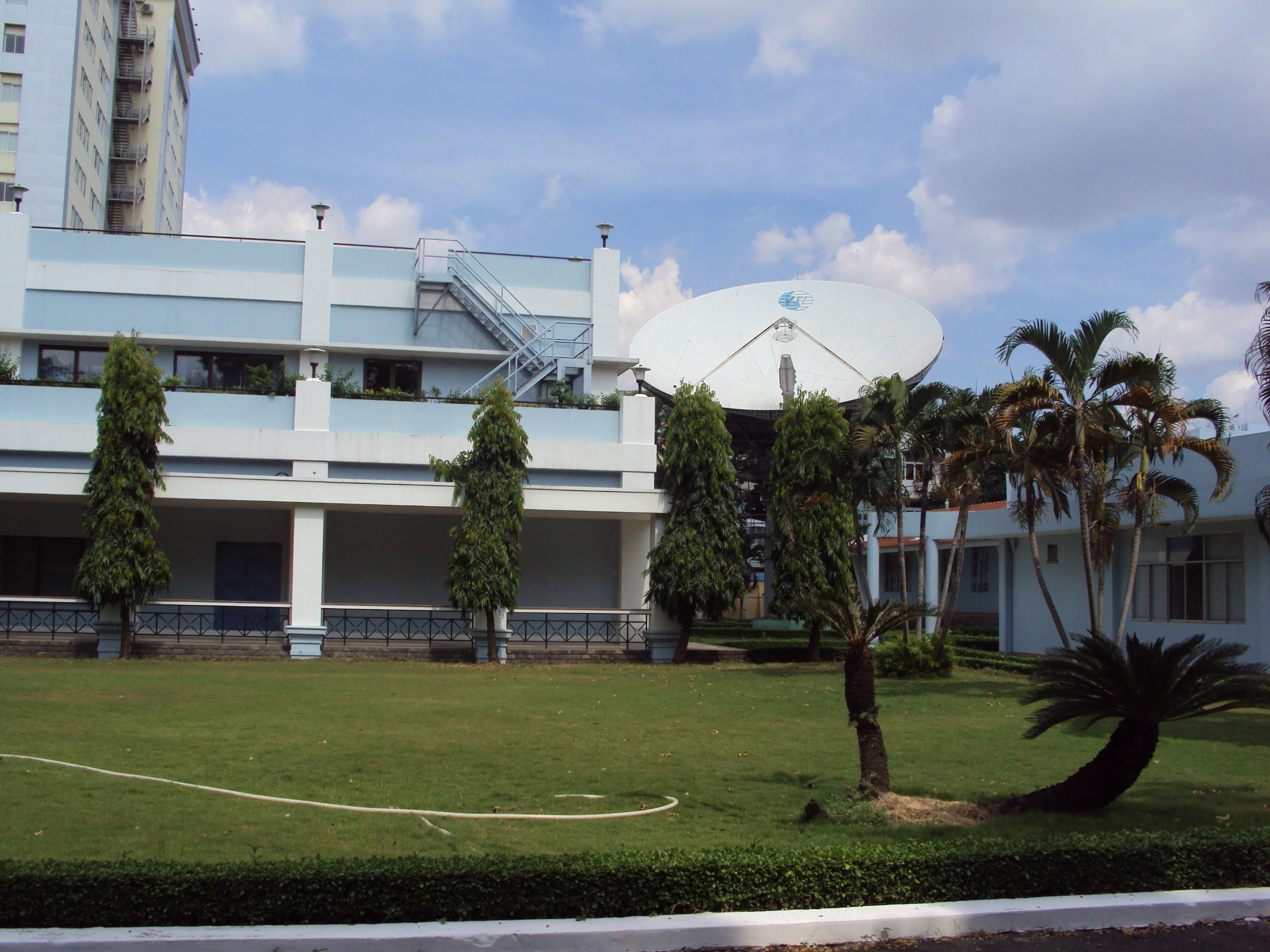
International Telecom Center 2 (Lotus Station) behind Lê Văn Tám Park

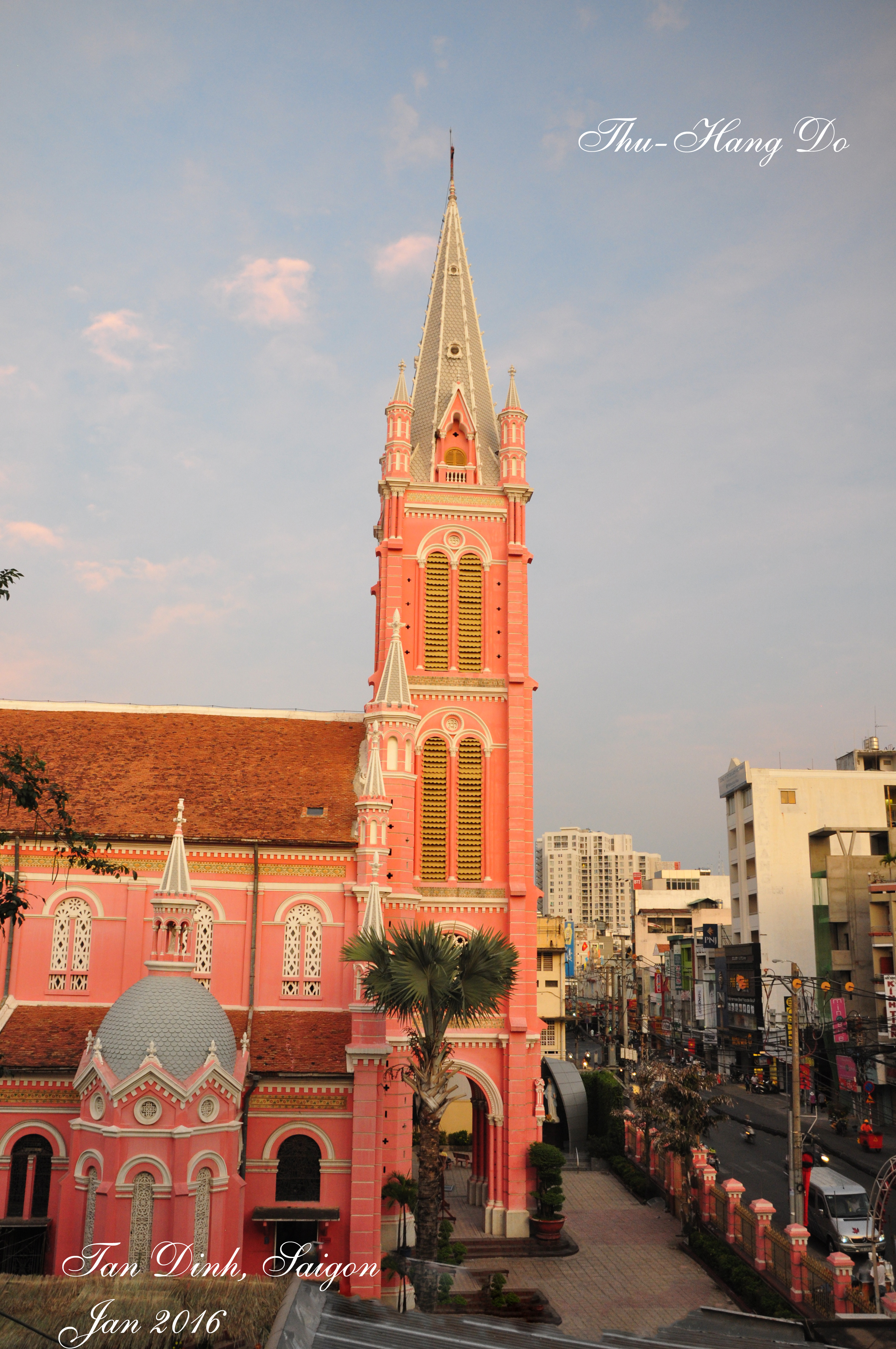
Tân Định Church in Xuân Hòa ward, across the street
