= International School of Bergen =

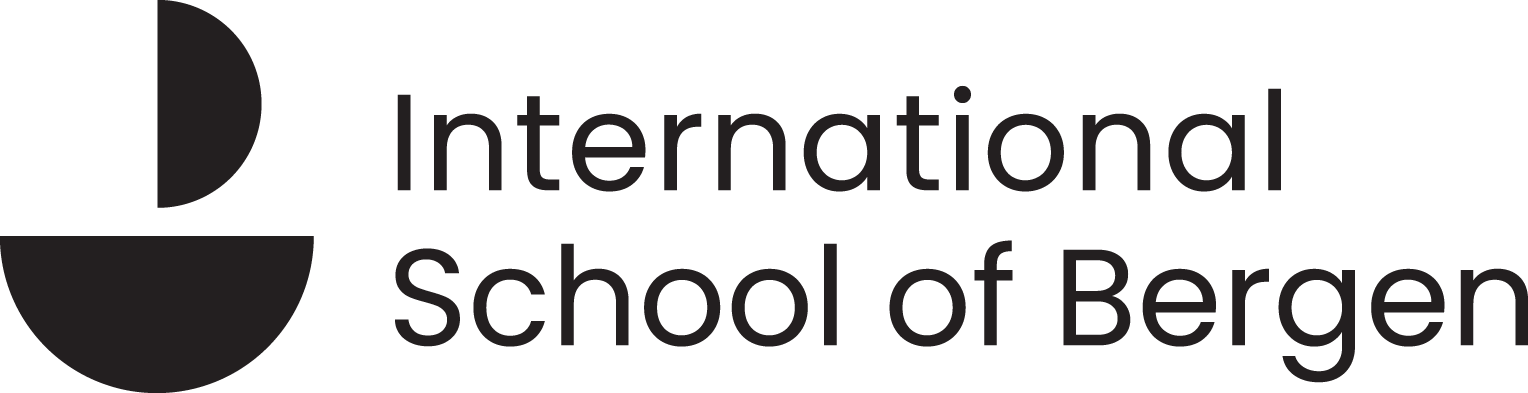

Location
- Sandslihaugen 36; 5254 Sandsli; Bergen, Vestland; Norway
- Coordinates: 60.2949°N 5.2804°E

Information
- Type: International School
- Motto: Learning for Life
- Established: 1975
- Director: Peter Ledger
- Staff: 59 employees in total
- Faculty: 39 teachers
- Enrollment: 245
- Website: www.isbergen.no

The International School of Bergen is an international school in Bergen, Norway. It caters for primary school to upper school level.

== History and programs ==
The International School of Bergen, founded in 1975, is a non-profit, co-educational day school that has been accredited since 1985 by the European Council of International Schools and the New England Association of Schools and Colleges, and is governed by a democratically elected Board of Trustees. The school provides an English language education, based on US/UK models, for children of expatriate families as well as local residents of the Bergen community. It offers the International Baccalaureate programs applicable to its current age range (IB Primary Years Program and IB Middle Years Program). It no longer offers the IB Diploma Program.

ISB was located in the neighbourhood of Slettebakken from the 1980s until 2019, when they moved to Sandsli. The school is mostly funded by tuition, but receives some subsidies from Bergen kommune.

== Staff and enrollment ==
As of 2024, the school has 56 employees in total, of whom 39 are teachers. Approximately 40% of the teaching staff is British, 30% American and 30% are from other countries, including China, Chile, India, Poland, France and Norway. At any one time about 245 children from approximately thirty nations are enrolled. The countries with the largest representation in the student body are UK, USA, India and Norway. The school's educational program has been designed to meet the needs of its international student body.

== Facilities and location ==
The facilities include a library with an integrated media center, a gymnasium, a computer room, art and music rooms and science laboratory. Nearby swimming and ice-skating facilities are also used.
