= Hai Bà Trưng Street, Ho Chi Minh City =

Street in Ho Chi Minh City, Vietnam

Hai Bà Trưng Street
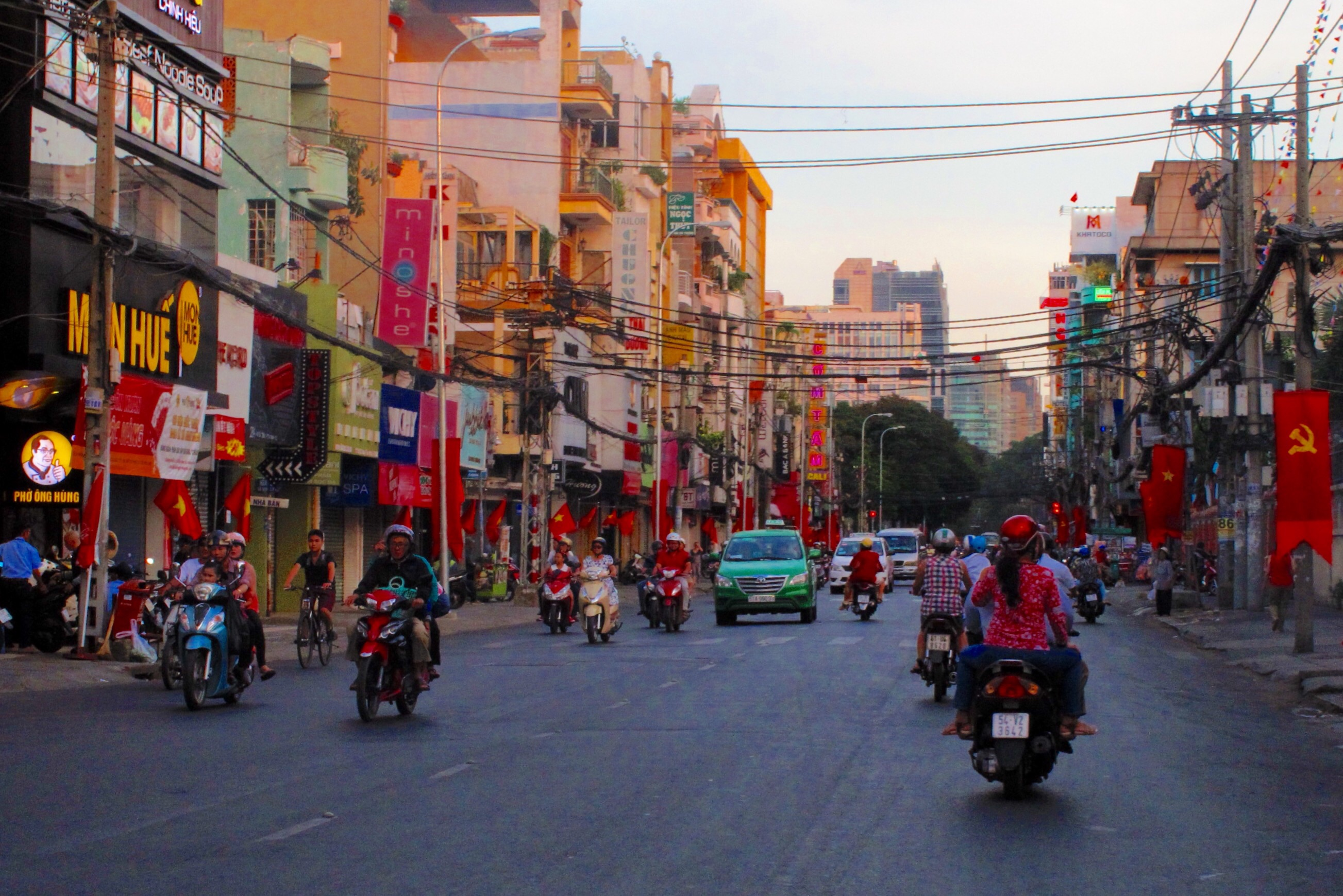
- Hai Bà Trưng Street in Tân Định
- Interactive map of Hai Bà Trưng Street
- Native name: Đường Hai Bà Trưng (Vietnamese)
- Former names: Route N° 14 (1859); Rue Impériale (1865); Rue Nationale (1870); Rue Paul Blanchy (1901); Rue Paul Blanchy et Trưng Nữ Vương (1952)
- Namesake: Trưng sisters
- Length: 2.97 km (1.85 mi)
- Width: 20m
- Location: Xuân Hòa, Tân Định, Saigon, Ho Chi Minh City
- Coordinates: 10.782425°N 106.698585°E
- Southeast end: Mê Linh Square
- Major junctions: Hai Bà Trưng - Đông Du; Hai Bà Trưng - Lam Sơn Square; Hai Bà Trưng - Lê Thánh Tôn; Hai Bà Trưng - Lý Tự Trọng; Hai Bà Trưng - Lê Duẩn Boulevard; Hai Bà Trưng - Nguyễn Thị Minh Khai; Hai Bà Trưng - Điện Biên Phủ; Hai Bà Trưng - Võ Thị Sáu
- Northwest end: Kiệu Bridge

Hai Bà Trưng Street (Vietnamese: Đường Hai Bà Trưng) is a major thoroughfare in downtown Ho Chi Minh City. Crosses the city formers central districts are District 1 and District 3, now are ward of Xuân Hòa, Tân Định, Saigon. It is one of the busiest and oldest streets in Ho Chi Minh City.

== Location ==
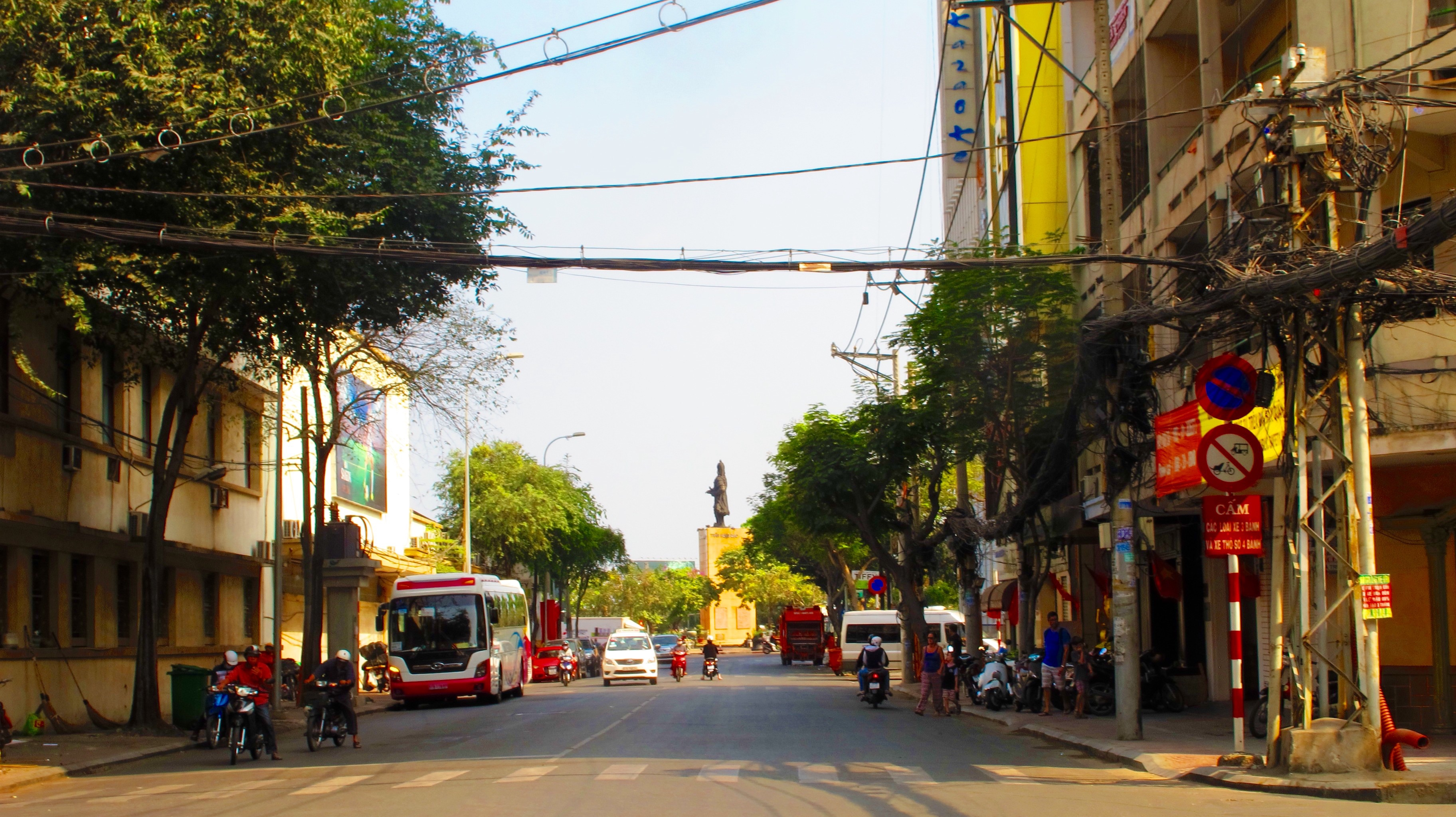
Hai Bà Trưng Street towards Mê Linh Square, at the intersection with Đông Du Street

Hai Bà Trưng Street has a length about 2.97 km, starts at Mê Linh Square next to Saigon River in the southeast and to Kiệu Bridge crosses over Nhiêu Lộc–Thị Nghè Canal in the northwest, intersects with other bustling streets in downtown are: Đông Du, Lê Thánh Tôn, Lý Tự Trọng, Lê Duẩn Boulevard, Nguyễn Thị Minh Khai, Nguyễn Đình Chiểu, Điện Biên Phủ and Võ Thị Sáu.

== History ==
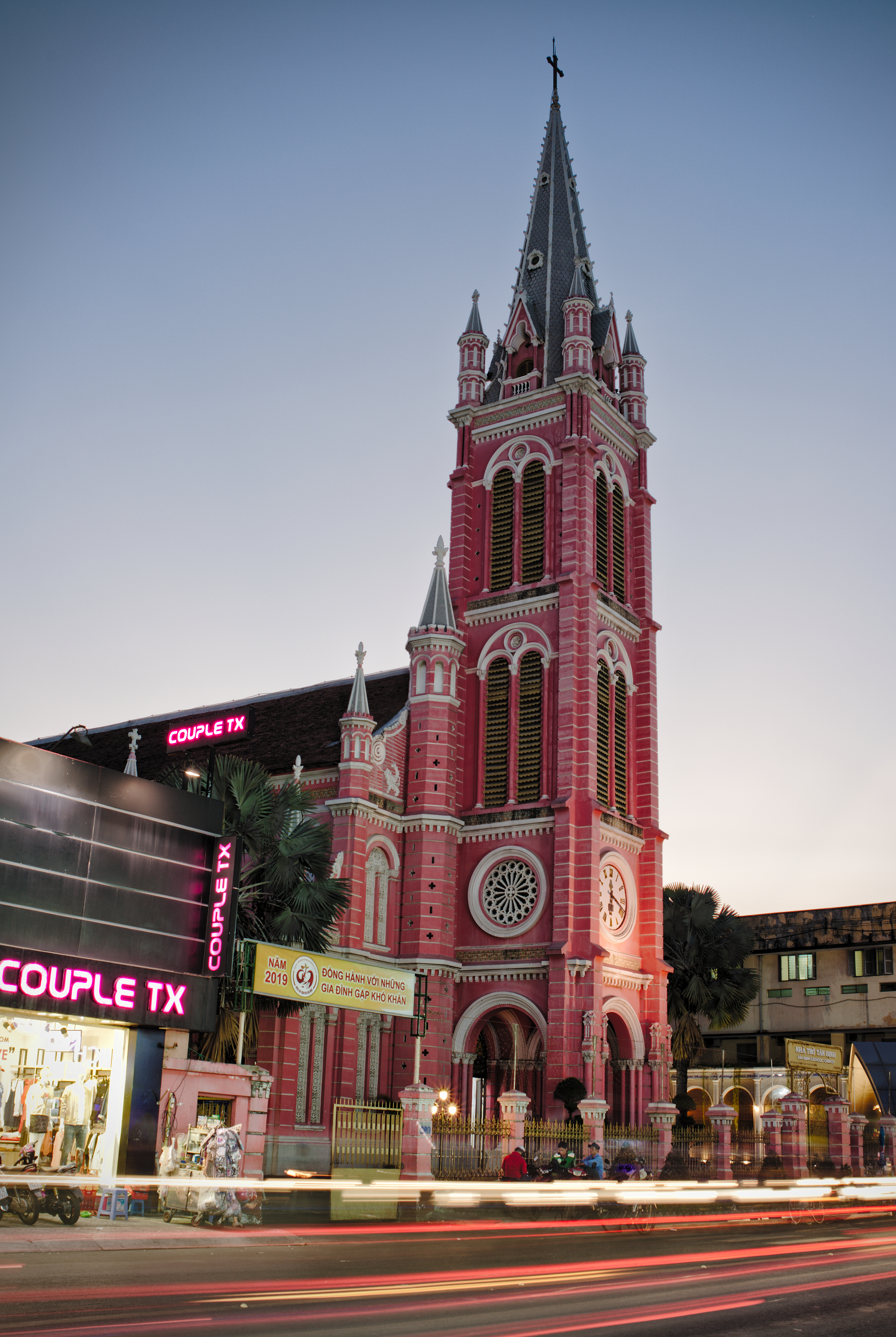
Tân Định Church

This road dates back to before the French colonial period, when it ran through the center of former thành Bát Quái (Citadel of Eight Trigrams), the first version of the Citadel of Saigon. After invading Saigon, the French authorities named it Route N° 14, then renamed Rue Impériale in 1865, and again Rue Nationale in 1870. In 1901, Paul Blanchy, the mayor of Saigon then, passed away, and a year later, the government decided to rename Rue Nationale to Rue Paul Blanchy. According to some reports from 1904, this was the first road in Saigon to be paved with asphalt concrete. The paved section 1.337 m long, 6 m wide, from Boulevard Norodom (now is Lê Duẩn Boulevard) to Rue Marché (now is Trần Quốc Toản Street), the asphalt was imported from France.

In 1952, the government of State of Vietnam rename the section of the road from Boulevard Norodom to Kiệu Bridge as Rue Trưng Nữ Vương, while the half still keep Rue Paul Blanchy. In1955, the government of Republic of Vietnam decided to merge both section and named as Đường Hai Bà Trưng, this name is kept until now.

== Notable buildings ==
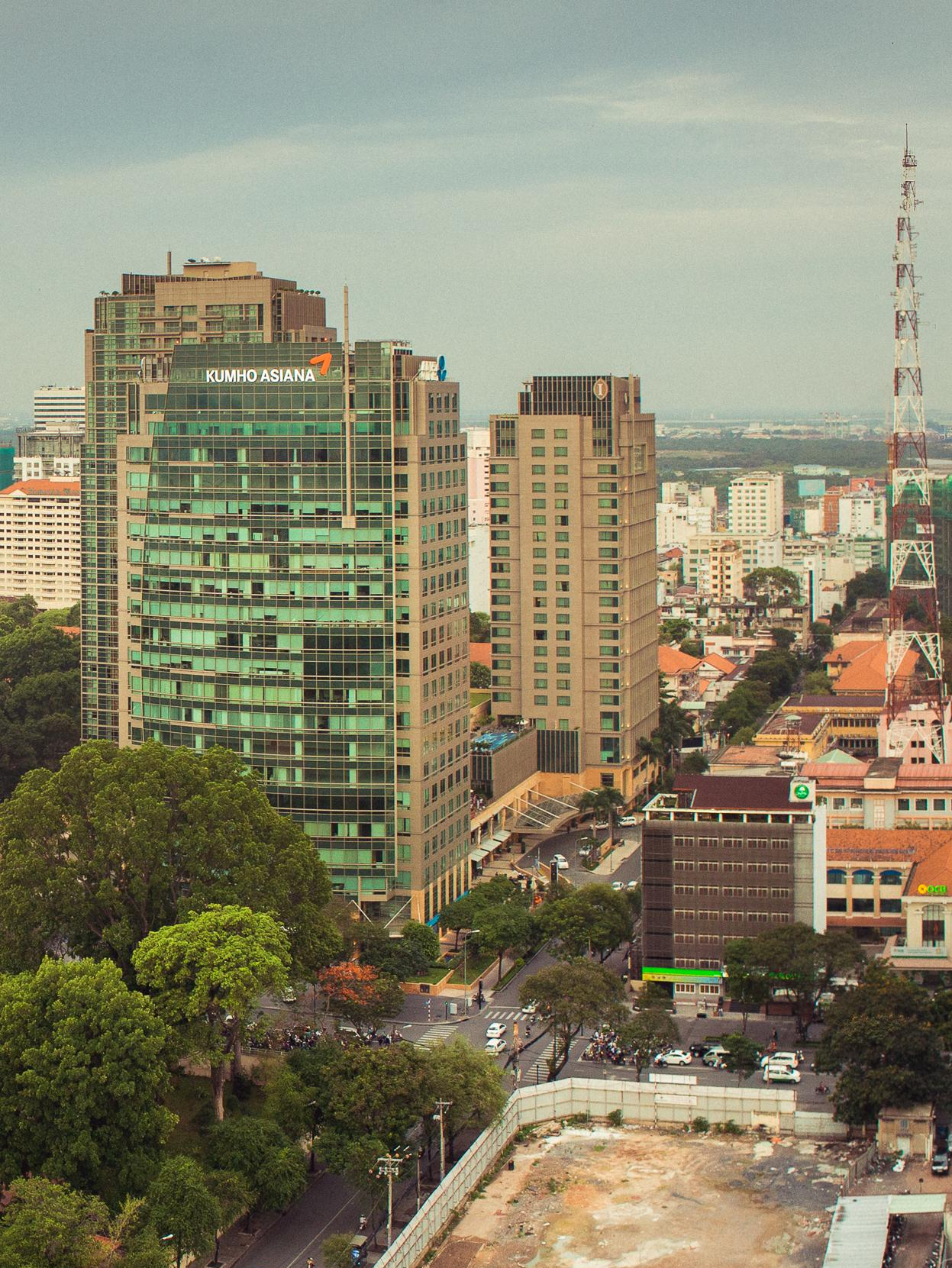
Hai Bà Trưng Street seen above from Centec Tower, towards Saigon River with mPlaza Saigon Complex (known as Kumho Asiana Plaza then) on the left and the antenna tower of VNPT Ho Chi Minh City on the right

- Vietcombank Tower
- Phước Lộc Thọ Building
- Savvy by M Village Hai Bà Trưng
- Lam Sơn Square
- Saigon Opera House
- Park Hyatt Saigon Hotel (formerly place of 1964 Brinks Hotel bombing)
- Signature by M Village Hai Bà Trưng
- The Manufacture Courtyard (formely place of La Manufacture d'Opium)
- SEAMEO Regional Centre for Longlife Learning
- Senla Boutique Hotel
- Institure for Educational Research
- mPlaza Saigon complex
  - JW Marriott Hotel & Suites Saigon
- Children Hospital 2
- Headquarters of the Ho Chi Minh City Post Office (behind the Saigon Central Post Office)
- Nguyễn Văn Bình Book Street
- Consulate-General of France, Ho Chi Minh City
- Consulate General of China, Ho Chi Minh City
- Youth Cultural House
- Empress Tower
- Department of Industry and Trade Ho Chi Minh City
- Novotel Saigon Centre Hotel
- Lê Văn Tám Park
- Tân Định Church
- Tân Định Market
- Tân Định General Hospital
