= Chống Lừa Đảo =

Vietnamese non-profit cybersecurity organization

- Formation: December 27, 2020
- Founder: Hieu Minh Ngo; Nguyen Hung; Le Phuoc Hoa; Nguyen Hoang Thang
- Type: Nonprofit, Social enterprise
- Legal status: Foundation
- Official language: Vietnamese language
- Key people: Nguyen Manh Luat; Pham Tien Manh
- Website: chongluadao.vn

ChongLuaDao (Vietnamese: Chống Lừa Đảo, lit. 'Scam Fighters') is a Vietnamese non-profit cybersecurity organization that helps clients verify the legitimacy of websites and block access to dangerous ones to keep them safe while using the internet. This non-profit project was started by a group of Vietnamese computer security specialists, including Hieu Minh Ngo, a former hacker who is now a technical expert for the National Cyber Security Centre (NCSC), Le Phuoc Hoa, Nguyen Hoang Thang, and Nguyen Hung.

== Beginning ==
After serving his time in U.S. federal prison for stealing persons' personally identifiable information, hacker Hieu Minh Ngo (also known as HieuPC) left for Vietnam in August 2020. Hieu is considered "one of the most prolific identity thieves ever to grace a federal prison". Returning to Vietnam in the wake of a surge in cybercrime, he has teamed up with a number of other professionals in information security to launch a nonprofit project aimed at preventing cybercrime, alerting users to bad websites, and protecting them from malicious content. Hieu claims that Scam Fighter is a project he has cherished during his time in the US. These are all purportedly part of HieuPC's "rehabilitation" efforts, along with several other community initiatives.

A group of programming and information security specialists composed the core team of the project, including Nguyen Manh Luat, Nguyen Hung, Le Phuoc Hoa, Pham Tien Manh, and Hieu Minh Ngo. The project team has so far included roughly 30 people. Additionally, Duong Ngoc Thai, a former Google engineer and leader of the security and application encryption team, serves as the project's confidential data security counsel for its customers.

== Launch and development ==
=== 2020–2022: Initial launch and enterprise establishment ===
The non-profit ChongLuaDao officially started operations on December 27, 2020. The "ChongLuaDao" project, including the website and the plug-in extension, is formally launched by February 2021, with server infrastructure operated by Vietnix Hosting. The plug-in extension has more than 3,500 downloads, more than 70,000 views, and has added more than 1,000 scam websites to the denylist as a result of more than 1,400 user reports in just one day after introduction. They also teamed up with the Anti-Phishing Working Group to share data on cyberthreats. As of October of the same year, the average monthly traffic to the website of ChongLuaDao to test the reliability of another website was about 35,000. They continued to release apps for Android and deploy application development for IOS after the plug-in extension's success on web browser platforms. The application was created using machine learning techniques and often updated datasets that were derived from community contributions. Their chatbot debuted on Facebook Messenger in September. Through this, Facebook users may instantly assess the trustworthiness and security of a website on their phone while chatting live with automated software. Hieu Minh Ngo announced the establishment of the ChongLuaDao Social Enterprise Limited Liability Company (also known as the ChongLuaDao Company) on November 24, 2021, of which he served as CEO.

During the final few months of 2022, Vietnamese users are often deceived by phony applications and websites that steal personal information. Reports of fraudulent banking domains are regularly sent to the ChongLuaDao Project. Their main message was to call for community engagement to protect oneself and those around them. By the start of 2023, ChongLuaDao had attracted more than 300,000 users to join the community through Telegram, Facebook, and web browser extensions, helping more than 11,000 victims of cyber fraud. In its more than two years of operation, the project has received collaboration and support from significant institutions and tech companies like PhishTank, Meta, and Viettel Cyber Security. A database of 15,000 malicious URLs, including websites that steal personal information, are malicious, or contain malware, has been made available to users. The project discovered more than 3,200 fake websites taking assets and collecting user data in the first quarter of 2023. Additionally, the app has 50,000 regular users, and its widgets and API threat feeds have been included in many other worldwide products, such as those from Kaspersky Anti-Virus software and Cisco (OpenDNS), Viettel, and CyRadar, among other security and cybersecurity firms.

=== 2023–2024: Expanding influence ===
Throughout its operating duration, the project team regularly issued warnings regarding the situation and often occurring fraud, in addition to offering remedies and help to fraud victims. Vietnam had a spike in ransomware assaults and deepfake videos around May 2023. The ChongLuaDao team has provided assistance in a number of counterfeit incidents where users have lost money. They not only alert and assist fraud victims, but they also offer a phone line for free legal assistance. As of now, ChongLuaDao is not only a source of data but also one of the websites, a tool that is frequently offered to readers to warn and report on harmful websites, as the Vietnamese press issues warnings about cyber fraud. In September and October 2023, ChongLuaDao conducted two seminars to increase public understanding of information security and fraud forms. This is a unique workshop series for the deaf and hard-of-hearing communities in Hanoi and Ho Chi Minh City. By the end of December of the same year, ChongLuaDao's items had been recognized at the Vietnamese Talent Awards (Vietnamese: Nhân tài Đất Việt) in the product category "Contribution to the Community". This prize was given to the initiative shortly before its third anniversary. On January 5, 2024, the third anniversary of the ChongLuaDao project's founding was celebrated in Ho Chi Minh City. Many members from governmental organizations, including the National Cyber Security Center, the Vietnam Blockchain Association, and the Vietnam Information Security Association, as well as major Vietnamese technology businesses, including FPT, VNG, and CMC Cyber Security, attended the event. By the time of the event, ChongLuaDao's member communities had reached 500,000 members on the Facebook platform and 25,000 members in the Telegram group, thereby helping ChongLuaDao detect and handle more than 20,000 malicious websites.

In 2024, amid the continued rise of online scams in Vietnam, representatives of ChongLuaDao frequently participated in events and conferences on information security generally and fraud prevention specifically to raise community awareness and provide useful solutions. From October 16-18, 2024, in Bangkok, Thailand, the "Mekong-U.S. Partnership Track 1.5 Policy Dialogue on Countering Scam Operations" workshop attracted over 90 international experts along with civil society organizations and governments from Mekong region countries, the United States, and other international partners. Ngo Minh Hieu, as founder of Chống Lừa Đảo, participated in discussions and contributed anti-fraud solutions and human trafficking prevention through online fraud activities, especially with the development of artificial intelligence (AI). On October 22, in Da Nang, the Authority of Information Security organized the Conference on Protecting People and Customers from Online Fraud in Cyberspace. A representative from the ChongLuaDao team presented a paper titled "Outsmarting Online Fraud 4.0 – A Defensive Revolution for Banking, Securities, Finance, and Government."

On October 29, under the chairmanship of the State Bank of Vietnam, the Vietnam Banks Association and IEC Group co-organized the Smart Banking 2024 Workshop and Exhibition, an annual major event for the finance-banking industry. With the theme "Shaping the Digital Future for Banking: Safe and Sustainable Operating Strategy," the 2024 event emphasized the importance of security protection measures and sustainable development strategies for the banking industry in digital space. CLD was one of the accompanying units participating in an exhibition booth at this event. One month after Smart Banking, Positive Hack Talks took place in Hanoi, organized by Positive Technologies. This was a gathering of cybersecurity experts to discuss hot topics in the industry. At the event, CLD CEO Hieu Ngo participated in an opening presentation session with the theme "Hack the Hackers: The Art of Blackhat Counterintelligence." By the end of December, this CEO continued representing CLD in discussions at the "Enhancing Capacity for Preventing and Combating Financial Crimes in Cyberspace" roundtable organized by Ho Chi Minh City Police in cooperation with the Vietnam Blockchain Association. During the discussion, he issued warnings about the danger of automated fraud software widely used by transnational criminal organizations.

=== 2025–present: New developments ===
==== AI application tools ====
In April 2025, ChongLuaDao launched a new AI-powered tool for checking fraudulent websites. This project was developed by a team of 4 students under the leadership of the CLD founding team. Unlike the previous operation where users could only check fraudulent websites if they were already stored in database, this new tool uses artificial intelligence to instantly check any website submitted by users. The tool conducts a comprehensive website evaluation from content, source code, and screenshots to assess whether it is a scam website. According to a member of the tool's development team, the tool currently has up to 98% accuracy in detection. At the end of April, CLD officially launched a new website integrating the aforementioned AI tool and many other new features, including a chatbot that automatically answers any questions related to online fraud prevention and cybersecurity law.

According to sharing from Hieu Ngo, the website's artificial intelligence system operates in two modes: real-time AI and AI Agent. In real-time mode, machine learning algorithms running directly in the user's browser analyze website characteristics and predict risks. The AI Agent tool automatically analyzes whether a website is safe. This combined approach helps speed up processing to support users quickly. Within just one day of launch, traffic to the official website increased fivefold. After 4 months, the tool had processed over 68,000 analyses. Not stopping at checking fraudulent websites, ChongLuaDao continued developing a malware scanning feature for websites using PHP, especially WordPress sites. In October, this tool reached the final round of the Vietnam Talent Awards 2025 in the Promising Digital Technology Product category, and officially won Third Prize at the Awards Ceremony held on the 27th.

== Cooperation ==
In August 2022, the API of the ChongLuaDao project was incorporated into the social media platform Twitter, one of the top five most-visited websites. As a result, users cannot publish URLs that are denylisted, and Twitter will also notify users when they input these links in tweets and direct messages. ChongLuaDao formally inked an agreement with the Law Library (Vietnamese: Thư viện Pháp luật) in October of the same year to collaborate in the implementation of assistance programs to safeguard users from the danger of cyber fraud. The Global Anti-Scam Alliance's research on worldwide internet fraud uses data from two initiatives, one of which is ChongLuaDao. And now, ChongLuaDao is currently a GASA supporting member. In December, the Vietnamese government gave their products the Make in Vietnam prize, making them one of the top 10 items for the digital society.

Today's most popular browsers, including Microsoft Edge, Google Chrome, Cốc Cốc, Firefox, and Brave, all support the ChongLuaDao plugin extension. Microsoft and Opera systems proceeded to stop users from accessing the fraudulent site after receiving data from ChongLuaDao. On March 29, 2023, ChongLuaDao and Top CV worked together to analyze businesses and recruitment data in order to identify, stop, and alert users to various types of recruiting team fraud, safeguard the interests of employees, and other legitimate businesses. A strategic data sharing cooperation between Chong Lua Dao and AI SPERA, the creator of the Cyber Threat Intelligence (CTI) search engine Criminal IP, was launched on June 7, 2023. Together, they work to improve cybersecurity efforts throughout the world and make the internet a safer place for both people and companies.

At the end of August 2023, the Authority of Information Security of Vietnam, the FIDO Alliance, and VinCSS co-hosted the first FIDO APAC Summit in Vietnam. With the involvement of several corporate executives and specialists in the sectors of technology and cybersecurity, the conference was held over the course of three days in Nha Trang under the topic "Connecting for a Safer Digital Future: Passwordless Authentication in the APAC Region." At the event, ChongLuaDao and network services company VinCSS signed a partnership agreement with the goal of engaging in a number of joint activities together, including education to increase community awareness, the deployment of technology solutions for identification and security authentication, and assisting Vietnam in bolstering its digital space defense capabilities and reducing the risk of becoming a target of international cybercriminals.

In November of that same year, the Global Anti-Scam Alliance (GASA) released a report about scams in Asian nations, including Vietnam. The authors of this report are ChongLuaDao, Gogolook, and GASA. The report's contents indicate that ChongLuaDao is a significant partner in the data collection process about scams in Vietnam. Also around this time, ChongLuaDao and GASA collaborated to issue a report about scams in Vietnam in 2023. The data provided in the two reports piqued the interest of the Vietnamese media as soon as it was revealed, and continued to be discussed following ChongLuaDao's celebration of its third anniversary of project planning. During the celebration, ChongLuaDao also revealed that the project's API has been directly included in Google Chrome, one of the most widely used web browsers available today, with the intention of providing users with automatic protection from ChongLuaDao data sets without requiring any further work on their part.

== Activity ==
The following are a few activities and events that the ChongLuaDao has dispatched members to represent at both domestically and abroad:

=== Events ===
| Date | Event | Organization | Nation | Member | Ref. |
|---|---|---|---|---|---|
| November 2021 | Global Online Scam Summit | ScamAdviser | Online | Hieu Minh Ngo | |
| November 2021 | CISO Online ASEAN | Corinium Global Intelligence | Online | Hieu Minh Ngo | |
| March 2022 | CISO Sydney | Corinium Global Intelligence | Australia | Hieu Minh Ngo | |
| March 2023 | GISEC | Cyber Security Council | United Arab Emirates | Hieu Minh Ngo | |
| March 2023 | Raising Cyber Security Awareness | TED, Đakao | Vietnam | Hieu Minh Ngo | |
| May 2023 | Black Hat Asia | Black Hat | Singapore | Pham Tien Manh; Duong Tieu Dong | |
| August 2023 | FIDO APAC Summit 2023 | FIDO Alliance, VinCSS | Vietnam | Hieu Minh Ngo | |

=== News ===
| Date | Content | Broadcast channel | Note | Ref. |
|---|---|---|---|---|
| September 2022 | ChongLuaDao hunts malicious websites | VTV1 | (Note: A section of the VTV1 show "24h Motion"'s programming.) | |
| February 2023 | Lost 1.4 billion dong in 3 days because of online scam | VTV1 | (Note: A section of the VTV1 show "24h Motion"'s programming.) | |
| February 2023 | Online scam vortex | VTV1 | (Note: A section of the VTV1 show "24h Motion"'s programming.) | |
| February 2023 | Thousands of victims of cyberbullying have been helped. | Lao Động TV | | |
| June 2023 | Recruitment fraud. | VTV9 | | |
| September 2023 | Digital transformation: Forms of online scams | KTV | (Note: Part of the Digital Transformation program of KTV channel.) | |
| October 2023 | Digital transformation: Artificial Intelligence scam tricks | KTV | (Note: Part of the Digital Transformation program of KTV channel.) | |
| November 2023 | Digital transformation: Types of bank scam. | KTV | (Note: Part of the Digital Transformation program of KTV channel.) | |
| January 2024 | On average, Vietnamese people lose nearly 18 million VND due to online fraud | National Assembly Television | | |
| January 2024 | Online fraud in Vietnam breaks out in 2023 | | | |

=== Workshops, seminars ===
| Date | Event | Location | Member | Ref. |
|---|---|---|---|---|
| March 2023 | Information security in cyberspace | Industrial University of Ho Chi Minh City | Ngô Minh Hiếu; Lê Phước Hòa | |
| September 2023 | Raising awareness of information security for deaf people | Ho Chi Minh City | Nguyễn Hưng; Lê Phước Hòa; Nguyễn Hoàng Thắng | |
| October 2023 | Raising awareness of information security for deaf people | Hanoi | Ngô Minh Hiếu | |

== Member ==
=== Founder ===
- Hieu Minh Ngo: cyber security specialist.
- Nguyen Hung: CMO of Vietnix Hosting and the admin of Sinh viên IT (IT Students) group on Facebook.
- Le Phuoc Hoa: former technical expert at Vietguys.
- Nguyen Hoang Thang.

=== Others ===
- Duong Hong Phuc: software development engineer.
- Tran Uoc Chi: designer.
- Nguyen Manh Luat: former security engineer for Microsoft and Tencent, CEO of CyberJutsu.
- Pham Tien Manh: security researcher at OWASP was once honored by Facebook as one of 100 security experts in 2019.
- Nguyen Trong Dai: cyber threat hunter, former National Cyber Security Centre (NCSC) cyber security specialist.
- Duong Tieu Dong: high school student, was recognized by Microsoft for helping them increase the security of their online service.
- Nguyen Hong Hao: cyber threat hunter.
- Kent Juno: former Technical Support Manager at Dell Technologies Malaysia.
- Ta Cong Son: AI research and development expert.
- Pham Le Duy.
- Tiet Le Bao Khanh.

== Awards ==
| Year | Awards | Category | Result | Ref. |
|---|---|---|---|---|
| 2022 | 2022 Champion Organizations | Cybersecurity Awareness Month Champion Organizations | Won | |
| 2022 | Make in Vietnam | Top 10 items for the digital society | Won | |
| 2023 | 2023 Champion Organizations | Cybersecurity Awareness Month Champion Organizations | Won | |
| 2023 | Vietnam Talen Awards | Contribution to the Community | Won | |
