= Nguyễn Mạnh Luật =

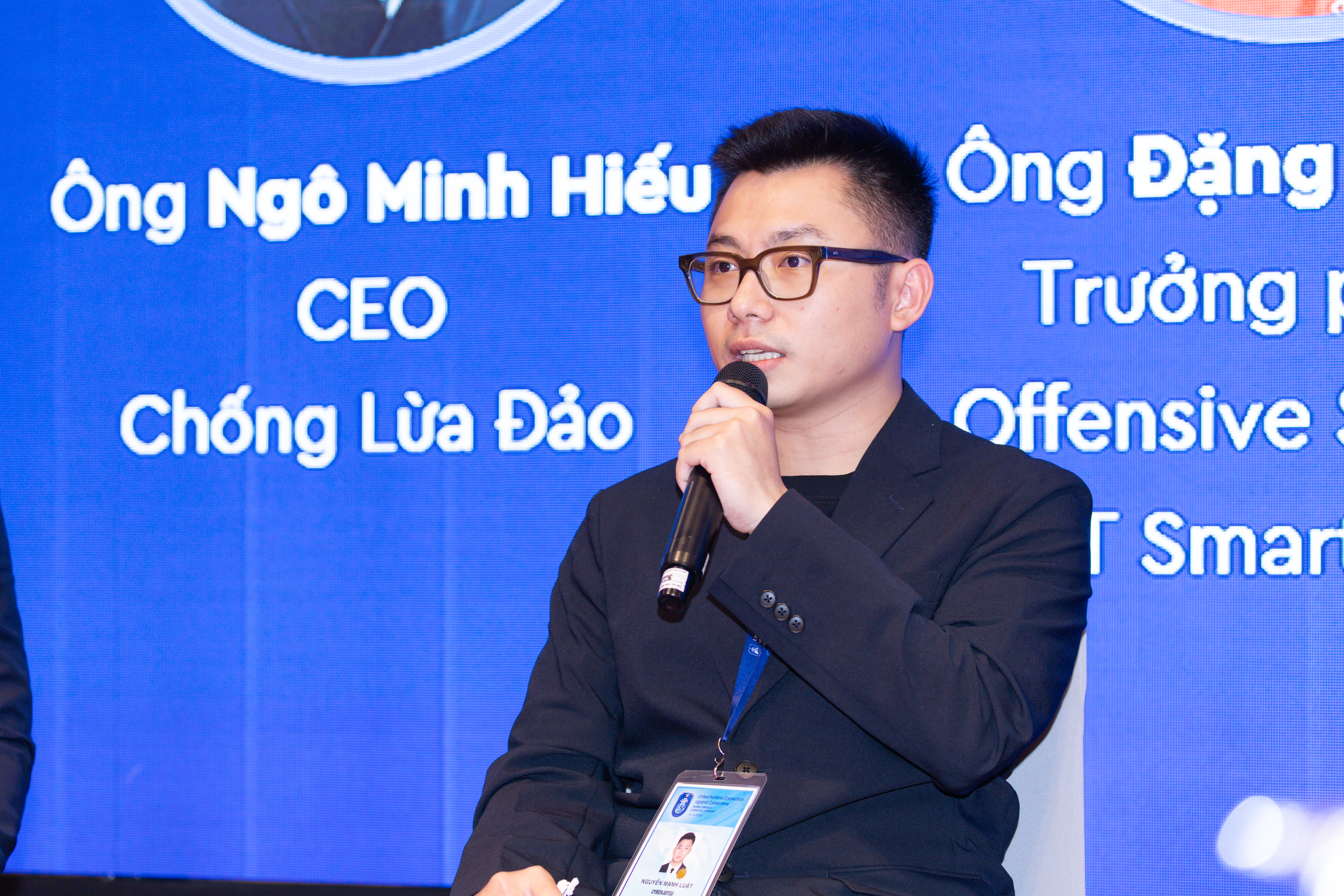
- Nguyễn Mạnh Luật in 2025
- Born: Nguyễn Mạnh Luật
- Citizenship: Vietnam
- Education: University of Information Technology
- Occupation: Cybersecurity Specialist
- Organization(s): Chong Lua Dao; CyberJutsu
- Known for: Cyber Seagames 2015 Champion
- Website: l4w.io

Nguyễn Mạnh Luật (born 1993) is a Vietnamese cybersecurity specialist. A member of the Vietnamese team that won the Cyber Sea Game 2015 championship, he is currently the co-founder and CEO of the CyberJutsu Academy Information Security Training Center.

== Biography ==
=== Early life and education ===
Nguyễn Mạnh Luật was born in 1993 in Vietnam. He studied computer science at the University of Information Technology, Vietnam National University, Ho Chi Minh City, and graduated in 2016.

In 2015, while a final-year student, he and two other students from the University of Information Technology were selected to participate in the final round of the Cyber Sea Game 2015, a cybersecurity skills competition for contestants under 30 from ASEAN countries, held in Jakarta, Indonesia in November. Each country sent 1 to 2 representative teams, with each team consisting of three members. Luat became a member of Team Vietnam 1. This was the first time the competition had been held as part of activities aimed at strengthening cooperation among ASEAN countries. Members of the Vietnamese team were selected from individuals who had won prizes in annual information security competitions, as well as outstanding students from universities with information technology or information security departments. Luat's team secured the championship, leading the runner-up (Thailand) by 500 points, making them the first champion of the Cyber Sea Games. Following this success, the Vietnamese team, along with the Thai team, represented the region at the global SECCON competition held in Japan in January 2016.

Even as a student, Luat was recruited to work at several major technology companies in Vietnam and regularly participated in Capture The Flag (CTF) competitions under the nickname l4w.io. After graduation, he became a security engineer for Tencent, a major Chinese technology corporation, working in the advanced research lab focused on attack techniques. During his time at Tencent, he competed in CTF events with the A*O*E team, achieving notable results, including Top 3 at Defcon CTF in the United States (2017) and Top 10 at the Google Capture The Flag finals held in Switzerland. In 2018, after more than a year in Shanghai, he left Tencent to move to the United Kingdom at the invitation of Microsoft, where he worked on the Incident Response Team until he returned to Vietnam in March 2020.

=== Founding the information security training center ===
While working abroad, Nguyễn Mạnh Luật co-founded CyberJutsu with the goal of sharing information security knowledge with the Vietnamese community. From 2017 to 2019, he hosted many free live streams to share expertise and industry experience. In 2020, CyberJutsu officially began business operations in Vietnam, with him serving as the center's CEO. In August 2022, two years after launching its training activities, CyberJutsu received investment from ECQ Global—a Singapore-based cybersecurity company—to develop IT security personnel training in Vietnam and the ASEAN region.

This period also saw him co-found the non-profit project Chong Lua Dao (Scam Fighter) with other cybersecurity experts, including Hieu Minh Ngo. In late 2022, he and the Chong Lua Dao team won a Top 10 award for excellent digital products for a digital society at the Make in Vietnam 2022 awards. As a security expert for Chong Lua Dao, he frequently provides commentary and interviews on issues related to information security and scam prevention, and has contributed to cybercrime reports by major global organizations such as the United Nations Office on Drugs and Crime (UNODC). In May 2023, he shared insights on supply chain attacks at a workshop organized by the Vietnam Information Security Association (VNISA).

In March 2025, the Central Committee of the Vietnamese Youth with Disabilities Association, in coordination with Microsoft Vietnam, launched the "Bình dân học vụ số" (Digital Literacy Campaign) movement for Vietnamese youth with disabilities. At the launch ceremony, the organizers announced the "Digital Literacy Campaign" team, composed of experts from various fields, including Luat Nguyen. In May, CyberJutsu collaborated with Chong Lua Dao to organize a CTF competition as a part of the GISEC Global 2025 International Cybersecurity Conference—the largest annual security event in the Middle East. Also in May, CyberJutsu continued to host the CyberRush CTF competition during the 7th Vietnam Security Summit Conference and Exhibition, co-organized by the National Cybersecurity Association and IEC Group. In September, Luat Nguyen, along with CyberJutsu and Chong Lua Dao, participated in the annual high-level banking seminar and exhibition, Smart Banking 2025, organized by the State Bank of Vietnam and IEC Group. Notably, CyberJutsu served as the professional partner for the DF Cyber Defense 2025—active cyber defense drill program.

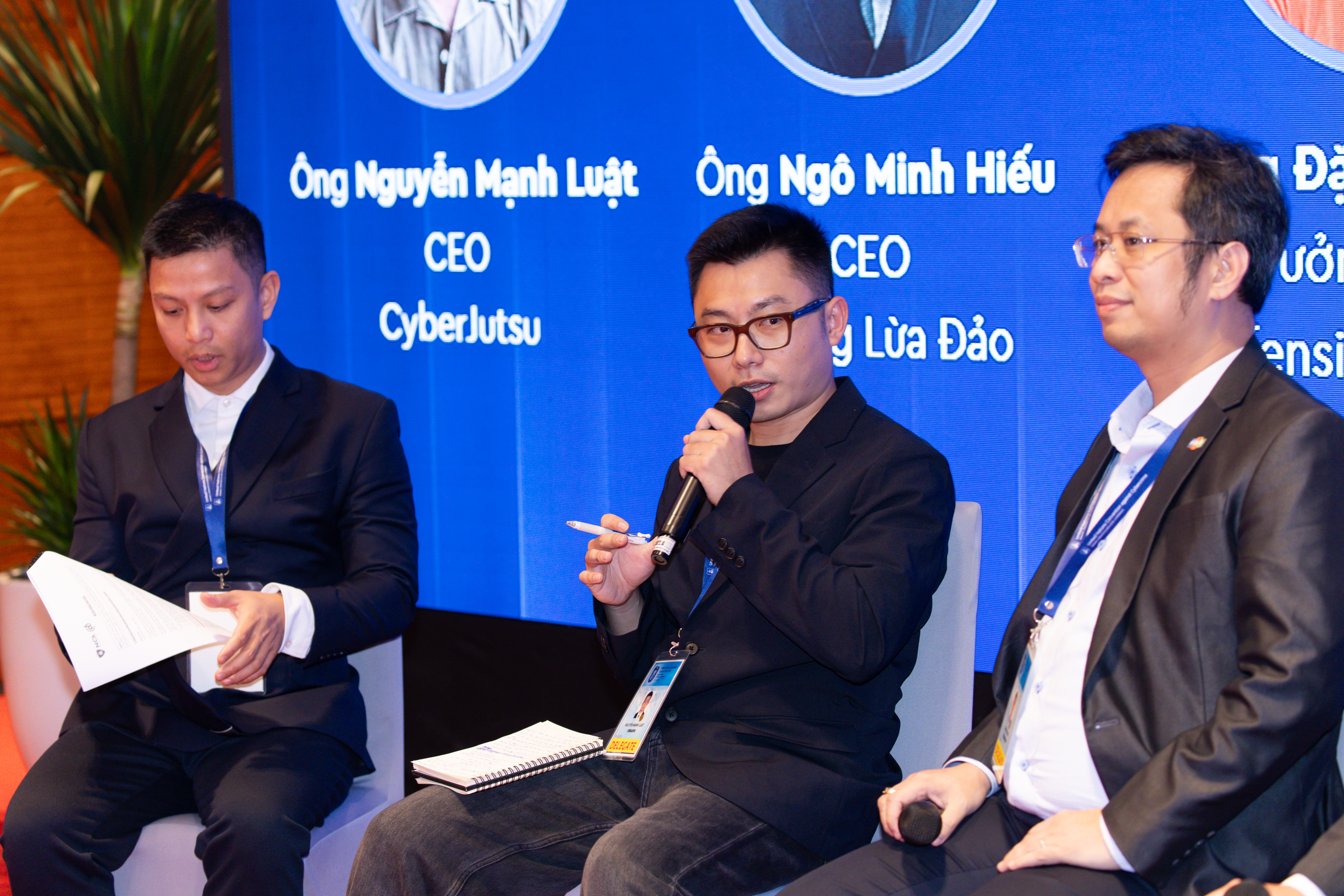
Nguyễn Mạnh Luật (the middle) at the event organized by ChongLuaDao

In October 2025, Vietnam hosted the signing ceremony and High-level Conference of the United Nations Convention against Cybercrime (known as the Hanoi Convention). As part of the conference, Chống Lừa Đảo, in collaboration with the National Cyber Security Association (NCA), organized a dialogue titled "Safeguarding Citizens and Reinforcing Digital Trust in Implementation of the Hanoi Convention on Cybercrime". This event was attended by representatives of Vietnamese government agencies, technology corporations, international organizations, and media agencies. At this seminar, Luat, in his role as CEO of CyberJutsu, participated in the discussion panel on capacity building and inter-sectoral collaboration in cybersecurity.

== Activities ==
Seminars and events that Nguyễn Mạnh Luật participated in as a speaker
Year	Month	Conference/Event	Organizer	Ref.
2022	June	Ensuring national cyber information security in the digital transformation era	VNCERT/CC	
2022	August	Workshop "Cybersecurity Training in Vietnam" - Techfest 2022	Ministry of Science and Technology	
2023	May	Workshop "Warning about risks and prevention of online scams"	VNISA	
2023	November	IT Fest 2023	FPT Software	
2025	October	Safeguarding Citizens and Reinforcing Digital Trust in the Implementation of the Hanoi Convention on Cybercrime	NCA; Chong Lua Dao	
