= Zalo =

Vietnamese instant messaging and social media service

- Original author: Vương Quang Khải
- Developers: Zalo Group; VNG Corporation
- Release: August 1, 2012; 14 years ago
- Operating system: Windows, macOS, Android, iOS, web application
- Available in: 2 languages
- List of languages Vietnamese, English
- Type: Instant messaging and VoIP application
- Website: zalo.me

Zalo is a Vietnamese instant messaging multi-platform service developed by VNG Corporation. Zalo is also used in other countries outside of Vietnam, including the United States, Japan, South Korea, Australia, Germany, Myanmar and Singapore.

As of Q3 of 2026, Zalo has approximately 82.6 million active monthly users with nearly 2.2 billion messages sent each day. Zalo is currently available in all 34 provinces and municipalities of Vietnam, including islands and remote areas, and is accessible in more than 23 countries worldwide.

According to the Decision Lab's Connected Consumer report released in Q2/2026, Zalo continues to lead the Vietnam's messaging landscape. Around 81% of Vietnamese citizens use the app, with 54% of respondents citing it as their preferred platform.

== History ==
=== Launch ===
The name for Zalo is a portmanteau of Zing, an online website managed by VNG), and alo, a standard phrase used to answer a call in Vietnam.

Zalo was founded by Vương Quang Khải, the executive Vice President of VNG. After studying in the United States, he returned to Vietnam in 2007. Recently, he began to work primarily on Artificial Intelligence technology, developing Kiki, an AI-based virtual assistant.

The first software test version of Zalo was released in August 2012, eight months after development began in late 2011. By September 2012, Zalo had released new versions on iOS, Android and the Nokia S40. However, Zalo received little recognition due to various user issues, including having to use Zing ID for login and utilizing web platforms for the mobile application.

In December 2012, the official version for Zalo was released to the public. On 8 January 2013, Zalo reached the top spot on the App Store in Vietnam, passing their main competitor, WeChat.

In March 2013, Zalo reached its 1 million user milestone and quickly grew, having over 2 million users only two months later, surpassing all international competitors, including Viber and Line.

=== Usage ===
Zalo has been continuously adding new features, such as short videos, enhanced privacy features and other improvements to the software.

In 2021, Zalo launched Zalo Connect to help citizens in COVID-19-affected areas connect and support each other.

In May 2022, Zalo added experimental end-to-end encryption that utilizes the Signal protocol. As of version 25.01.01, this feature is no longer available.

Since 2022, Zalo began to introduce a series of artificial intelligence features, including eKYC in 2022; text-to-speech, voice-to-text, Zalo AI Avatar in 2023; voice dictation and zSticker AI in 2024.

By the end of Sep 2026, 41% of Zalo users are actively engaging with its built-in AI features.

== Main features ==
- Free text messaging with emojis, images, videos and voicemail.
- Free phone calls (including video calls).
- Creating and replying to status messages.
- File sharing.
- Creating reminders.
- Adding friends (directly by phone number, finding people by phonebook or by scanning QR codes).
- Mobile payment by credit card via ZaloPay.
- Zalo is accessible by web browser and through an application on supported devices.

== Records ==
=== Awards and recognition ===
- In February 2013, Zalo was regarded as "one of the most innovative mobile applications" by international technology news website Tech in Asia.
- In April 2013, Zalo won the 2013 Sao Khue Award – an award presented by the Vietnam Software Association (VINASA) to recognize outstanding technological and scientific advancements of Vietnam.
- In March 2014, Zalo reached 10 million users with 120 million messages sent per day, dominating 50% of the smartphone market in Vietnam.
- In February 2016, Zalo grew fastly with 45 million users, having a total of 1 million new users per month.
- In February 2017, Zalo reached 70 million users, approximately 75% of the population of Vietnam.
- In January 2019, at an event hosted by the Ministry of Information and Communications, former Vietnamese Prime Minister Nguyễn Xuân Phúc expressed the importance of Zalo in the lives of Vietnamese people, stating "Where there are Vietnamese people, there is Zalo".
- In mid-2020, Zalo became the top messaging and communication software in Vietnam in terms of both usage and popularity.
- In 2021, Zalo Connect feature was titled as a "Creative Vietnamese Technological Solution" at Tech Summit 2021, hosted by VnExpress.
- In March 2022, Global Brand Magazine awarded Zalo the Global Brand Award, rating it as the most used messaging app in Vietnam, above WeChat and WhatsApp.
- According to research by the Decision Lab in Q4 of 2021, up to 48% of people surveyed used Zalo to communicate with friends and family, while Facebook and Messenger's statistics were 27% and 20% respectively.

=== User milestones ===
Date	Milestone
March 2014	10 million users
November 2014	20 million users
May 2015	30 million users
April 2016	50 million users
September 2016	60 million users
August 2017	70 million users
21 May 2018	100 million users

== Controversies ==
=== Social media operation without a license ===
In 2018, Zalo was found operating its social media service without a license, which resulted in a punishment. However, authorities allowed their domains to remain active, giving Zalo's parent company, VNG time to complete licensing documents, which they failed to do.

In July 2019, the Ho Chi Minh City branch of the Ministry of Information and Communications issued a document demanding parties responsible for registering and managing domain names revoke Zalo.vn and Zalo.me by the 19th of July. The domains continued to function beyond that date. Afterwards, the ministry extended the submission deadline.

On 11 November 2019, the Zalo.vn domain was suspended for 45 days to allow authorities to investigate potential violations. Prior to that, VNG submitted an application for the license that did not meet the criteria for approval, resulting in the temporary suspension.

On 24 December 2019, Zalo was officially granted a social network license.

=== Concerns regarding the Find Nearby feature ===
Zalo's mobile app's Find Nearby feature allows users to scan for nearby individuals. This feature was enabled by default, leading to strangers messaging users when location services are enabled, raising privacy concerns.

=== Paywalls ===
On 1 August 2022, Zalo began charging users, resulting in restricted access to certain features for those with free accounts. Immediately after, Zalo saw an increase in 1-star ratings on the App Store and Google Play, along with boycotts and multiple threats to delete the application.

== See also ==
- VNG Corporation
