= FPT =

FPT may refer to:

- Female pipe tapered; see National pipe thread
- F/P/T, an acronym used by Canadian governments to designate a joint Special Advisory Committee of Federal/Provincial/Territorial civil servants
- Fiat Powertrain Technologies, an Italian automotive company
- Fixed-parameter tractability, in computer science
- Florida Playwrights' Theatre, an erstwhile theatre group in Hollywood, Florida, United States
- Forced perfect termination, in electronics
- FPT Group, a Vietnamese IT company
  - FPT Software, a Vietnamese software company
- FPT Industries, an American aerospace engineering company
- FPT Industrial, an Italian designer and manufacturer of transmissions, axles, diesel and petrol engines
- FPT University, in Vietnam
- Full Pressure Turbo, in Saab automobiles
- Portuguese Tennis Federation (Portuguese: Federação Portuguesa de Ténis)
