= Trương Gia Bình =

Vietnamese businessman (born 1956)

- Born: 1956 (age 69–70)
- Education: BSc and PhD Moscow State University
- Occupations: Co-founder and Chairman; FPT Corporation
- Years active: 1988–present
- Known for: Co-founding FPT – the leading ICT company in Vietnam
- Awards: One of the Vietnam's Top 10 ICT Persons of the Decade (2000–2009); Nikkei Asia Prize 2013; Order of the Rising Sun, 3rd Class, Gold Rays with Neck Ribbon (2026)

Trương Gia Bình (born 1956 in Nghệ An Province) is a Vietnamese businessman. He is best known as the co-founder and chairman of the Vietnamese technology company FPT Corporation, which he also led as chief executive officer for many years. He was a founder of the Vietnam Software Association (VINASA) and in 2013 served as a vice president of the Asian-Oceanian Computing Industry Organization (ASOCIO).

== Early life ==
Trương Gia Bình was born in 1956 in Nghệ An Province. His father, Truong Gia Tho, was a doctor in Hanoi. Binh attended Chu Van An high school in Vietnam, and then went to the Soviet Union for college. He graduated from the Faculty of Mechanics and Mathematics, Lomonosov Moscow State University in 1978. He obtained his PhD in 1982 from the same university. In 1991, Bình was recognized as an associate professor by the Vietnamese state.

== Career ==
In March 2002, after the equitization of FPT, Bình became the chairman and chief executive officer (CEO) of FPT Corporation. Afterwards, he led the firm in its expansion from its origins as an internet service provider to other areas such as software outsourcing for Japanese companies.

In 2006, his company opened FPT University, Vietnam's first private university, and he also took up a position as the chairman of its managing board. In January 2007, the value of his stake in FPT, as stated in the company's prospectus, was VND2.6 trillion (US$164 million, 5,117,280 shares at VND525,000), which led to media speculation that he was the richest person in Vietnam. Bình said he was "tired" of the rumours.

Bình later passed the CEO position to other executives while remaining chairman. After CEO Trương Đình Anh resigned in September 2012, Bình temporarily took over as CEO again. On 31 July 2013, the board appointed Bùi Quang Ngọc as CEO, separating the roles of chairman and CEO. Nguyễn Văn Khoa succeeded Ngọc as CEO in March 2019, with Bình remaining chairman of the board.

On July 16, 2012, Trương Gia Bình was appointed to a member of the National Council for Sustainable Development and Competitiveness Building. In October 2017, he was appointed head of the Private Economic Development Research Board (known as Board IV), a body under the Prime Minister's Advisory Council for Administrative Procedure Reform that advises on reforms of policies and administrative procedures affecting the private sector.

In September 2023, his holding of about 7% of FPT's shares, worth around VND8.4 trillion, placed him among the ten richest individuals on the Vietnamese stock market, a position he had last held in 2008.

== Honors and public recognition ==
In February 2010, Bình was voted by the Post Newspaper, the voice of the Ministry of Information & Communications and ICT journalists from over 30 popular newspapers in Vietnam as one of the Vietnam's Top 10 ICT Persons of the Decade (2000–2009).

In 2013, Trương Gia Bình was awarded the Nikkei Asia Prize in the regional growth category, becoming the first Vietnamese businessman to receive the prize. Bình received the award for having contributed to the development of his own company but also to the development of IT business in Vietnam. He set up a software industry organization and a university to foster IT experts. Nikkei Inc. presented the prize on 22 May 2013. Jury member Yasuhiko Torii cited his role in establishing the Vietnam Software Association and in building a university to train IT workers.

In the 2026 Spring Conferment of Decorations on Foreign Nationals, announced on 29 April 2026, the Government of Japan awarded Bình the Order of the Rising Sun, Gold Rays with Neck Ribbon, for contributing to the promotion of economic exchanges between Japan and Vietnam. Japanese Ambassador to Vietnam Ito Naoki presented the decoration to him at a ceremony in Hanoi on 10 July 2026.
