= Hanoisme =

SME association in Vietnam

Hanoi Association of Small and Medium Enterprises
- Hiệp hội Doanh nghiệp nhỏ và vừa TP Hà Nội
- Abbreviation: Hanoisme
- Formation: 1995; 31 years ago
- Type: Business association
- Purpose: Representing small and medium-sized enterprises in Hanoi
- Headquarters: Hanoi, Vietnam
- Members: Over 11,000 enterprises (2025)
- Chairman: Đỗ Quang Hiển
- Vice President & General Secretary: Mạc Quốc Anh

Hanoisme (legally known as the Hanoi Association of Small and Medium Enterprises, Vietnamese: Hiệp hội Doanh nghiệp nhỏ và vừa TP Hà Nội) is the primary business association representing small and medium-sized enterprises (SMEs) in Hanoi, Vietnam. Founded in 1995, the association reports a membership of over 11,000 enterprises.

The association functions as an intermediary "bridge between businesses and state management agencies". Its activities include policy consultation, organizing trade promotions, and providing business training. SMEs in Hanoi, which the association represents, are a significant component of the capital's economy, reportedly contributing between 40% and 50% of Hanoi's GRDP.

In 2025, on its 30th anniversary, Hanoisme received the First Class Labor Medal from the Vietnamese government. It is chaired by businessman Đỗ Quang Hiển, who was re-elected for the 2023–2028 term.

== History ==
Hanoisme was established in 1995. By 2025, the association had grown to more than 11,000 members. Its organizational structure includes 28 district-level clubs, four associated clubs in Ho Chi Minh City, and five representative offices internationally, located in the United States, Japan, Austria, Czech Republic, and Singapore.

On 11 May 2025, the association held a ceremony to celebrate its 30th anniversary. The event was attended by Vietnamese Vice President Võ Thị Ánh Xuân, who awarded Hanoisme the First Class Labor Medal for its contributions to development.

== Role and activities ==
Hanoisme's primary role is to act as a "bridge between businesses and state management agencies" and to support the private sector in Hanoi. The association states that it represents more than 300,000 enterprises. The SME sector, which accounts for 98%, is a major force in the city's economy, contributing an estimated 40% of Hanoi's GDP (according to Việt Nam News in 2024) to 50% of its GRDP (according to VnEconomy in 2023).

The association engages in policy advocacy, provides support programs, and promotes connections within the business community. Its functions include:

- Policy and Labor: Participating in wage negotiations to ensure worker rights and benefits.
- Policy Advocacy: Proposing initiatives, such as the 2024 proposal to establish a "Hanoi FTA Center" for better utilization of free trade agreements.
- Training and Development: Organizing training programs.
- Trade Promotion: Organizing trade promotions for products to domestic and foreign consumers.
- Events and Recognition: Hanoisme hosts the annual "Thăng Long Business and Entrepreneur Honor Ceremony".
- International Cooperation: Engaging in international partnerships, such as with the Czech Republic (AMSP ČR).
- Seminars: Co-organizing seminars, including a 2024 event on the role of the press, held in coordination with the Vietnam Journalists Association.

== Leadership ==
The association is led by a Chairman and a Vice President & General Secretary.

- Chairman: Đỗ Quang Hiển. He was re-elected for the 2023–2028 term.
- Vice President & General Secretary: Mạc Quốc Anh. He frequently acts as public spokesman.

== See also ==
- Đỗ Quang Hiển
- Economy of Hanoi
- Vietnam Chamber of Commerce and Industry (VCCI)
- Small and medium-sized enterprises in Vietnam
