= VNdroid =

VNDroid: Vietnamese Mobile Development Community is a Vietnamese-based mobile development community portal where mobile platform developers can share knowledge. The portal launched in December 2009.

== Background ==
VNdroid was conceived as a Vietnamese-based community focused on the Google Android platform. Few online portals were available for Vietnamese developers to share knowledge, particularly on emerging technologies such as Android and Windows Mobile. A group of developers, project managers, and business analysts from FPT Software, a Vietnamese outsourcing company, launched the portal to facilitate knowledge exchange and collaboration both within and beyond the company.

== Developers ==
The platform was developed by a team of software developers, project managers, and business analysts from organizations including FPT Software, DocJax.com, a document search service, and Skydoor.
