= Job3s.vn =

Vietnamese online recruitment platform

- Industry: Recruitment
- Founded: February 8, 2023; 2 years ago in Hanoi, Vietnam
- Founder: CEO Dr. Tony Vũ https://www.24h.com.vn/nhip-song-tre/ai-la-nguoi-dua-job3s-tro-thanh-thuong-hieu-uy-tin-hang-dau-chau-a-c685a1498713.html
- Successor: CEO Bui Thi Dung https://sohuutritue.net.vn/3s-group-voi-hai-nen-tang-noi-tieng-job3s-va-vntre-bo-nhiem-tan-tong-giam-doc-ceo-bui-thi-dung-thay-the-ceo-tony-vu-d324937.html
- Website: job3s.ai

Job3s.vn is an online recruitment platform in Vietnam. The platform received the Sao Khue Award 2024, in the A-IoT category for its integration of AI technology to connect candidates and employers. Job3s is part of 3s Group Technology Company, founded by Tony Vu.

Under the leadership of CEO Dr. Tony Vu, Job3s was listed in the Top 10 Prestigious Brands in Asia in 2023, jointly organized by the Vietnam Association for Science and Business Development, the Asia Business Research and Development Center, and the Asia Economic Research Institute. In addition, Job3s was also named in the Top 10 National Sustainable Brands in 2024 at the Army Theater, Hanoi.
