= Vietnam Chamber of Commerce and Industry =

- Liên đoàn Thương mại và Công nghiệp Việt Nam
- Founded: 1963
- Purpose: Business advocacy
- Location: Hanoi, Vietnam
- Key people: Hồ Sỹ Hùng, President
- Website: vcci.com.vn

Vietnam Chamber of Commerce and Industry (VCCI; Vietnamese: Liên đoàn Thương mại và Công nghiệp Việt Nam, lit. 'Federation of Commerce and Industry of Vietnam') is a national organization which assembles and represents business community, employers and business associations of all economic sectors in Vietnam. The promotion of trade and business relations with enterprises abroad is one of its main functions. VCCI is an independent, non-governmental, non-profit organization having the status of a legal entity and operating with financial autonomy. N.B. The email links on their site do not work.

== Standing committee ==
- Dr. Vu Tien Loc, President of VCCI, President of the Central Council of Vietnam Business Associations
- Dr. Doan Duy Khuong, Vice President of VCCI, Editor-in-Chief, VBF Magazine
- Mr. Vo Tan Thanh, Vice President of VCCI, General Director of VCCI Branch in Ho Chi Minh City
- Mr. Hoang Quang Phong, Vice President of VCCI, Vice Chairman of the Central Council of the Vietnam Business Associations
- Mr. Nguyen Quang Vinh, Member of the Standing Committee, General Secretary of VCCI, General Director Office for Business Sustainable Development, General Secretary of the Council of Business for Sustainable Development of Vietnam.
- Mr. Bui Trung Nghia, Deputy General Secretary of VCCI
- Ms Tran Thi Lan Anh, Deputy General Secretary of VCCI

== See also ==
- Vietnam Association for Anti-Counterfeiting and Trademark Protection
