= VnExpress =

Vietnamese online newspaper

- Screenshot of the English edition's homepage
- Website type: Online newspaper
- Available in: Vietnamese and English
- Founded: 26 February 2001; 25 years ago
- Headquarters: Duy Tân, Cầu Giấy District, Hanoi, Vietnam
- Owner: FPT Group
- Website: vnexpress.net (vi-VN) e.vnexpress.net (en-US)
- Commercial: Yes
- Registration: Required to comment and like
- Current status: Active

VnExpress is a Vietnamese online newspaper, run by FPT Group. It was the first newspaper in Vietnam that was not produced in paper format. It is one of the most popular websites in Vietnam according to Alexa Internet.

In 2020, its website had 10 billion views and received more than 5 million comments, with an average session duration of five minutes and 44 seconds.

VnExpress also operates an English-language edition, known as VnExpress International.
