= FPT University =

Private university in Vietnam

Coordinates: 21°1′43″N 105°46′48″E

- Trường Đại học FPT
- Other name: FPTU
- Motto: Future Forward – Global Ready
- Type: Private for-profit university
- Established: September 8, 2006
- Affiliations: FPT Corporation
- Location: Hanoi, Ho Chi Minh City, Da Nang, Can Tho, Quy Nhon, Vietnam
- Campus: Suburban
- Language: Vietnamese, English
- Website: daihoc.fpt.edu.vn

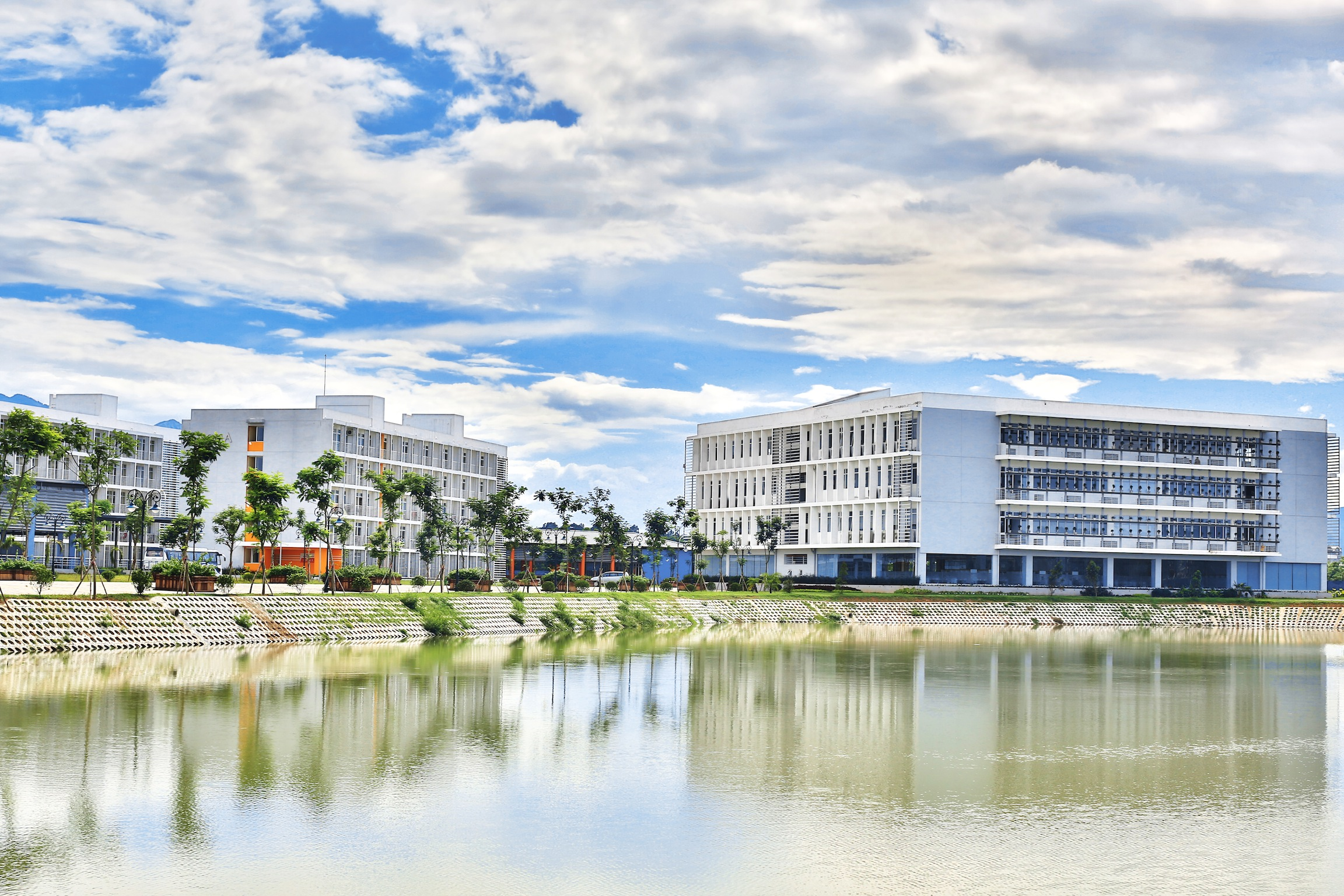
View of the university

FPT University is a private university in Vietnam. FPT University is a member of FPT Group and has campuses in Hanoi (main), Ho Chi Minh City, Da Nang, Can Tho and Quy Nhon (in progress).

== History ==
When FPT University was founded in 2006, Associate Professor Truong Gia Binh, Chairman of FPT Corporation, served as Chairman of the university, while Dr. Le Truong Tung became its first dean.

Dr Le Truong Tung was in the position of FPT University Rector as well as chairman of BoD in 2011. Dam Quang Minh has been rector since September 2014, the youngest rector in Vietnam at that time. In 2021, Dr. Nguyen Khac Thanh became the Rector of FPT University, succeeding Dr. Dam Quang Minh.

As of 2024, FPT University enrolls around 30,000 undergraduate and postgraduate students nationwide.

All instructors are required to have two years' working experience in the IT industry, and have to sit for an entrance examination. Foreign language teaching would form an integral part of the curriculum, and they aim to recruit native-speaking foreign language teachers and subject area teachers who can deliver their lessons in English. After one year of language preparation, students will reach English level from Luk to transition 6 or can be placed in classes from luk to transition 6 if they take part in the English entrance exam or can be specialised. if you have ielts certificate from 6.5, a foreign language would be used as the medium of instruction for all courses. English would not be the only such language used; the Vietnam Software Association are working with the school's embedded software faculty to establish a programme in Japanese.

FPT University will award a scholarship named Nguyen Van Dao in memory of his support when FPT University was founded. Professor Nguyen Van Dao was a mathematician and one of Vietnam's education administrators. The collaboration between FPT University and Microsoft, which is a strategic partner of the managing organization FPT, includes an arrangement with the university to offer training to their students on Microsoft technologies. At approximately US$13,600 for the four-year course of study, the university's fees are high compared to the US$720 cost of four years at a public university.

The fight to gain permission to open the university itself represented a rarity in Vietnam; the Ministry of Education (Vietnam) were originally unwilling to grant permission for the university to be opened, and delayed for two months the necessary approval for the university to begin enrolling students. FPT used the media to put pressure on the ministry, which eventually signed the official approval document on 15 November 2006.

The university runs a collaborative program with the University of Greenwich, England, the UK. The off-site Top-up +2, which began in August 2009, is a collaborative program between the University of Greenwich in the U.K. and FPT University in Vietnam and is currently the only program in Vietnam that awards Aptech graduates a U.K. bachelor's degree in one year. The university also offered the MBA programs in collaboration with Leeds Beckett University.

== Campuses ==
=== Hanoi ===
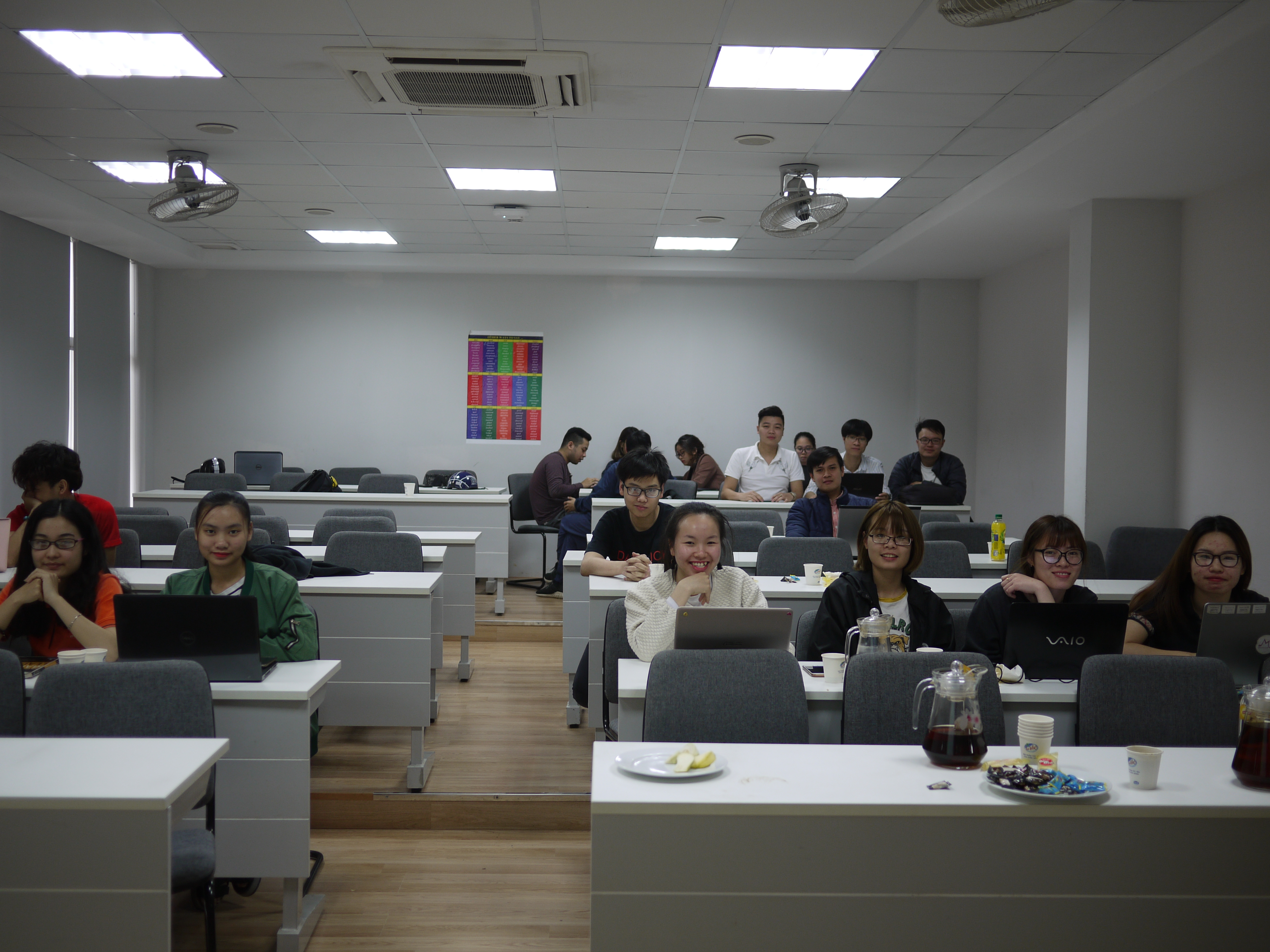
Wikipedia workshop at FPT University, Hoa Lac Hi-Tech Park, Hanoi in March 2018

Located at Hoà Lạc Hi-Tech Park - Km29, ĐCT08, Thạch Hoà commune, Thạch Thất district, Hanoi, Vietnam.

=== Ho Chi Minh City ===
Located at Lot E2a-7, D1 road, Saigon Hi-tech Park, Long Thạnh Mỹ ward, Thủ Đức, Ho Chi Minh City, Vietnam.

=== Da Nang ===
Located at FPT City residential area, Ngũ Hành Sơn district, Danang, Vietnam.

=== Can Tho ===
Located at Rau Răm Bridge, extended Nguyễn Văn Cừ road, An Bình ward, Ninh Kiều district, Cần Thơ, Vietnam.

=== Quy Nhon ===
Located at New Residential Area, Quy Nhơn City, Bình Định province, Vietnam.

=== Other campus ===
In August 2024, FPT Group announced plans to develop an education complex in Quang Ngai Province, supporting the region’s digital transformation in healthcare, infrastructure, and the economy.

In June 2025, FPT University broke ground on a new 84,000 m² education complex in Binh Duong Province, located in Tan Uyen City. The project includes lecture halls, dormitories, multi-purpose facilities, and sports areas, and is expected to start operations in 2026.

== See also ==
- Higher education in Vietnam
  - List of universities in Vietnam
