= Sao Khue Award =

Award for development of software and information technology in Vietnam

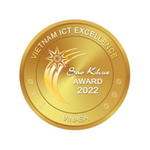
- Description: Outstanding achievements contributing to the development of the software industry and information technology sectors.
- Country: Vietnam
- Presented by: VINASA
- First award: 2003; 23 years ago
- Website: giaithuongsaokhue.vn

The Sao Khue Award is a science and technology award that recognizes businesses, organizations, groups, and individuals who have made outstanding contributions to the development of the software industry and information technology in Vietnam.

== History ==
In 2003, VINASA organized the first award to honor and recognize individuals and groups who have contributed to the development of the information technology industry in Vietnam. A total of 1089 awards have been presented over the 17 years of the award ceremony.

Since 2016, the Top 10 prestigious special titles for the 10 best products and services of the Information Technology industry in Vietnam have been evaluated and voted upon.

Among the winners, exceptional nominations in each category will be selected for the prestigious 5-star Sao Khue ranking, recognizing products and services that demonstrate outstanding technological superiority, economic efficiency, and social impact.

== Sao Khue Awards Past Winners 2025 ==
Top 10 Sao Khue Awards 2025 Winners
No.	Company	Product/Service	Field
1	NashTech Vietnam	Data Digitization and BPO Services	Data and process digitization
2	FPT Corporation	FPT Camera Agent Software	Smart devices
3	GIMO Joint Stock Company	Gimo App	Solutions to promote digital access
4	FPT Corporation	IT Infrastructure Operations Management Services	IT System Administration
5	IPOS.VN Joint Stock Company	iPOS FABi: Specialized management and operation solution for the F&B industry	Digital transformation services
6	MB Securities Joint Stock Company	Stock Mobile App – MBS Mobile App	Insurance/Securities/Investment
7	Online Mobile Services Joint Stock Company	MoMo financial application	Fintech
8	Prep Technology Joint Stock Company	PREP – Smart learning and test preparation platform	Education and training
9	Vietnam Joint Stock Commercial Bank for Industry and Trade	VietinBank iPay Mobile Digital Banking Application	Digital Banking

Group 1: Government, Administration, Public Sector
No.	Company	Product/Service	Abbreviated Name	Ranking
Field 1: Public Services
1.1	Vbee Data Processing Services and Solutions Joint Stock Company	Vbee AIVoice Text-to-Speech Solution	Vbee AI Voice	5 stars
Field 2: Administration, Management
2.1	CTech High Technology Joint Stock Company	CGIS URBAN Smart Urban Management and Construction Solution Set	CGIS URBAN	
2.2	HiNet Vietnam Technology Joint Stock Company	ERM index, reporting and statistics management software	ERM – STATISTICAL REPORT MANAGEMENT	
2.3	SmartBooks Company Limited	PABMIS Ecosystem Public Investment Project Management Digital Ecosystem	PABMIS Ecosystem	
2.4	Life Software Development Company Limited	Competition and Reward Management Software	Competition and reward management software	

Group 2: Community & People
No.	Company	Product/Service	Abbreviated Name	Ranking
Field 1: Digital Citizenship
1.1	FPT Corporation	Digital Citizen Platform Software – dCitizen	dCitizen	
Field 2: Solutions to Promote Digital Access
2.1	Joint Stock Commercial Bank for Foreign Trade of Vietnam	VCB Digibank Digital Banking Service	VCB Digibank	5 stars
2.2	S-TECH Technology Joint Stock Company	Building Care Building Management Software	Building Care	
2.3	Storm Eye Joint Stock Company	CANVATO	CANVATO	
2.4	Joint Stock Commercial Bank for Foreign Trade of Vietnam	VCB iCare – Financial solutions for the healthcare industry	VCB iCare	
Field 3: Medical, Health Care
3.1	Orenda Joint Stock Company	vClinic clinic management software	vClinic	
3.2	SMED Technology and Solutions Company Limited	SMED vaccination management software	SMED	
3.3	VNPT Information Technology Company – Branch of Vietnam Posts and Telecommunications Group	Medical Operation Center (VNPT HOC)	VNPT HOC	
Field 4: Education, Training
4.1	Ong But Educational Technology and Solutions Joint Stock Company	Mr. Al Buddha – Comprehensive education system	Mr. Buddha	
4.2	Aprotrain Applied Training Joint Stock Company	Information technology training services	Aptech Computer Education	
4.3	Aprotrain Applied Training Joint Stock Company	Digital media design training services	Arena Multimedia	
4.4	University of Information and Communication Technology – Thai Nguyen University	iBLS Smart Blended Training Solution	iBLS Solution	
4.5	VTC Online Media Joint Stock Company	Internet English Olympiad (IOE) Program	IOE Program	
4.6	Mobifone Telecommunications Corporation	MobiEdu MOOCs Open Online Training Solution	MobiEdu MOOCs	
4.7	VNPT Information Technology Company – Branch of Vietnam Posts and Telecommunications Group	Education Digital Profile – vnEdu HSS	vnEdu HSS	
Field 5: Smart Mobility
5.1	KZTEK Investment and Development Joint Stock Company	Parking EcoSystem	Parking EcoSystem	5 stars
5.2	KONE Vietnam Co., Ltd.	API solution connecting Robots with KONE Elevators	KONE Service Robot API	

Group 3: Business Administration
No.	Company	Product/Service	Abbreviated Name	Ranking
Field 1: Overall Business Management
1.1	BizTech Joint Stock Company	BizSolution Business Management Solution	BIZSOLUTION	5 stars
1.2	Besco Joint Stock Company	BeeSuite ERP	BEESUITE ERP	
1.3	Citek Technology Joint Stock Company	ERP Cloud Intelligent Enterprises Digital Transformation Solution	ERP Cloud Intelligent Enterprises	
1.4	IZISolution Company Limited	iziMES production management and operation system	iziMES	
1.5	One Mount Group Joint Stock Company	My One Mount App	My One Mount	
1.6	GMO-Z.com RUNSYSTEM Joint Stock Company	RUNERP – Enterprise Management System	RUNNERP	
1.7	SiciX Technology Joint Stock Company	SiciX digital business management software ecosystem	SiciX Platform	
1.8	Viindoo Technology Joint Stock Company	Viindoo ERP for Retail & Supermarket Chains	Viindoo Retail ERP Suite	
1.9	Datahouse Asia Consulting Joint Stock Company	VizERP Enterprise Resource Planning Platform	VizERP	
Field 2: Financial Management, Accounting
2.1	MISA Joint Stock Company	MISA AMIS Software for Business Accounting	AMIS Accounting HKD	5 stars
2.2	IVS Joint Stock Company	Aizen Accounting	Aizen	
Field 3: Human Resource Management
3.1	First Trust Vietnam Solutions Joint Stock Company	FTSHRM payroll human resource management software	FTSHRM	
3.2	MOR Software Joint Stock Company	Human Resource Management (HRM) Solution Consulting Service	HRM	
3.3	MCG Technology Solutions Consulting JSC	iPeopleX Human Resource Management Software	iPeopleX	
Field 4: Sales, Purchasing, Supply Chain Management
4.1	FPT Corporation	Smart monitoring product suite applying AI and IoT for retail	AIoT Retail	5 stars
4.2	Sapo Technology Joint Stock Company	Sapo Enterprise – Multi-channel operations solution, AI application and retail automation	Sapo Enterprise	5 stars
4.3	APETECHS Joint Stock Company	Purchasing Management Software	Purchasing Management Software	
4.4	Vietnam Export Import Commercial Joint Stock Bank	ESale+ Sales Management and Support System	ESale+ Sales Management	
4.5	MOR Software Joint Stock Company	Salesforce Consulting Services	Salesforce	
Field 5: Administration, Customer Care
5.1	Z Solution Joint Stock Company	Soly – AI Solution Suite for Personalization & Increased Repurchase Rates	Soly	5 stars
5.2	Electricity Telecommunications and Information Technology Company – Branch of Vietnam Electricity Group	Customer management information system 4.0	CMIS 4.0	
5.3	DigiNext Group Joint Stock Company	DIGICX switchboard	DIGICX	
5.4	MB Securities Joint Stock Company	Personal AI Stock Assistant App – Dolphin AI	Dolphin AI	
Field 6: Asset Management
6.1	TNTech Joint Stock Company	Smart real estate management and operation system – T.FM	T.FM System	5 stars
6.2	FOXAI Technology Joint Stock Company	Fox-Procurement Centralized Purchasing Products	Fox-Procurement	
6.3	HPT Information Technology Services Joint Stock Company	HPT CSEP – Asset Management Solution	HPT CSEP	
6.4	OneBS Joint Stock Company	One.EAM Asset Management Software	One.EAM	
6.5	Vietnam Bank for Agriculture and Rural Development	Vault Asset Management Software	Vault Asset Management	
Field 7: Office Administration
7.1	Gapo Technology Joint Stock Company (under G-Group Technology Corporation)	GapoWork – Digital workspace	GapoWork	5 stars
7.2	Opus Solution Company Limited	Tasken eOffice – Electronic Office	Tasken eOffice	5 stars
7.3	Joint Stock Commercial Bank for Investment and Development of Vietnam	B.ONE – Digital Workplace	B.One – Digital Workplace	
Field 8: Specialized Management
8.1	Viettel Technology Investment Company Limited	Electronic Flight Book System (Viettel SkyBook)	Viettel SkyBook	5 stars
8.2	Vietnam Bank for Agriculture and Rural Development	Internal Transfer Pricing (FTP) Software	Internal Transfer Pricing (FTP)	
8.3	UpWell Technology Solutions Co., Ltd.	TourWell tourism business management software	TourWell	

Group 4: Economics – Industry
No.	Company	Product/Service	Abbreviated Name	Ranking
Field 1: Industrial Production
1.1	Weldcom Industrial Joint Stock Company	Smart production line control software (SMARTLINEiQ)	SMARTLINEiQ	5 stars
1.2	BizTech Joint Stock Company	Shift handover software, production order BizSolution	BIZ – LSX	
1.3	IVS Joint Stock Company	Smart Factory	Smart Factory	
1.4	Advanced Solutions and Services Company Limited	SmartBiz MES Intelligent Manufacturing Execution System	SmartBiz MES	
Field 2: Resources, Energy
2.1	Electricity Telecommunications and Information Technology Company – Branch of Vietnam Electricity Group	Customer management information system 4.0	CMIS 4.0	
Field 3: Agriculture and Food Processing
3.1	Quang Ngai Sugar Joint Stock Company	Solution to ensure raw sugarcane is "Ripe-Fresh-Clean"	Raw sugarcane solution "Ripe-Fresh-Clean"	
Field 4: Construction, Real Estate
4.1	One Mount Real Estate Joint Stock Company – Real Estate Trading Floor	OneHousing App	OneHousing	
Field 5: Logistics and Supply Chain
5.1	FOXAI Technology Joint Stock Company	Fox-WMS warehouse management products	Fox-WMS	
5.2	IRTECH Technology Joint Stock Company	GTOS Smart Port Solution for Bulk and General Cargo	GTOS	
Field 6: Transport
6.1	EcoTruck Technology Joint Stock Company	EcoTruck Freight Management System	EcoTruck TMS	
6.2	FaceNet High Technology and Software Services Joint Stock Company and QPEC Joint Stock Company	Maritime OC Product – Managing the entire ship operation process	Maritime OC	

Group 5: Market – Consumption
No.	Company	Product/Service	Abbreviated Name	Ranking
Field 1: Digital Banking
1.1	Military Commercial Joint Stock Bank	Automate the entire unsecured loan process for mSMEs	Pre-approved mSME unsecured loans	5 stars
1.2	Saigon Thuong Tin Commercial Joint Stock Bank	Sacombank Pay Application	Sacombank Pay Application	5 stars
1.3	Military Commercial Joint Stock Bank	Automatic credit limit renewal for mSMEs	Auto-renewal mSME credit limit	
1.4	Vietnam Joint Stock Commercial Bank for Industry and Trade	VietinBank eFAST X-Mate – Premium version of Cash Flow Management for Corporate Customers	eFAST X-Mate	
1.5	Joint Stock Commercial Bank for Investment and Development of Vietnam	Esign – BIDV centralized digital signature system	ESIGN	
1.6	Equix Technologies LLC	Night Vision FX	Night Vision FX	
1.7	Savyint Group Joint Stock Company	Savyint Open Banking Platform (BaaS) – Open Banking Platform	Savyint Open Banking Platform (BaaS)	
1.8	Joint Stock Commercial Bank for Foreign Trade of Vietnam	VCB CashUp Mobile – Digital banking application for corporate customers	VCB CashUp Mobile	
1.9	Joint Stock Commercial Bank for Foreign Trade of Vietnam	VCB Digibank digital banking service	VCB Digibank	
1.10	Joint Stock Commercial Bank for Foreign Trade of Vietnam	VCB Online Lending – Online disbursement for corporate customers	VCB Online Lending	
1.11	Vietnam Joint Stock Commercial Bank for Industry and Trade	VietinBank Genie – AI Assistant	VietinBank Genie	
1.12	FPT Corporation	Volar FINEX Financial Core Software	Volar FINEX	
Industry 2: Fintech
2.1	VAM Investment Joint Stock Company	TOPI – Personal finance management and investment application	TOPI	
2.2	Vietnam Payment Solutions Joint Stock Company	VNPAY eKYC software	VNPAY eKYC	
2.3	VNG Corporation	Zalopay POD – Cashless collection solution for transport and delivery partners	Zalopay POD	
Field 3: Insurance/Securities/Investment
3.1	Goline Financial Technology Joint Stock Company	VGAIA digital stock trading platform	VGAIA	5 stars
3.2	FPT Corporation	AI Agent Digital Platform	AI Agent Digital Platform	
3.3	Bao Viet Group	Baoviet Direct customer portal application	Baoviet Direct	
3.4	Equix Technologies LLC	Equix	Equix	
3.5	Military Insurance Joint Stock Corporation	MIC Pro – Insurance Application for Sales Force	MIC Pro	
3.6	Vietnam Joint Stock Commercial Bank for Industry and Trade Insurance Corporation	MyVBI Mobile App	MyVBI Application	
Field 4: Retail and Distribution
4.1	TPIsoftware Company Limited	API Management Platform – digiRunner	digiRunner	
4.2	One Mount Distribution Joint Stock Company	VinShop	Vinshop	
Field 5: Sports, Entertainment
5.1	FPT Corporation	FPT Play Application	FPT Play	5 stars
Field 6: Tourism, Restaurant and Hotel Management
6.1	ezCloud Global Technology Co., Ltd.	ezCloud tourism management and business platform	ezCloud	

Group 6: Infrastructure – Digital Technology
No.	Company	Product/Service	Abbreviated Name	Ranking
Field 1: Security and Information Security
1.1	CyStack Vietnam Joint Stock Company	Bug Bounty and Vulnerability Management Platform for Enterprises	WhiteHub	5 stars
1.2	Verichains LLC	BShield	BShield	
1.3	Savyint Group Joint Stock Company	Enterprise Security Appliance – All in a Box	Enterprise Security Appliance	
1.4	Thanh Giong Computer and Communications Joint Stock Company	Software Module to protect user data Software SPM for Enterprise	Software SPM for Enterprise	
Field 2: Telecommunications, Internet
2.1	Leeon Group Corporation	Leeon SBC System	Leeon SBC	
2.2	FPT Corporation	Ultra Fast – Fast for games	Ultra Fast	
Field 3: Digital Data
3.1	SAVIS Technology Joint Stock Company	SAVIS Trusted Archive 2.0 – Permanently authenticated electronic archive system	SAVIS Trusted Archive 2.0	5 stars
3.2	Vietnam Bank for Agriculture and Rural Development	Centralized Monitoring System of Data Center Infrastructure	Data Center Infrastructure Monitoring	
3.3	VNPT Information Technology Company – Branch of Vietnam Posts and Telecommunications Group	Solution for managing and exploiting architectural construction planning database (VNPT ArcPlan)	Planning database management	
3.4	Vietnam Bank for Agriculture and Rural Development	Customer information authentication and cleaning management system	Authentication – Cleaning up customer information	
Field 4: Cloud Computing
4.1	VCCorp Joint Stock Company	Bizfly CDN	Bizfly CDN	
4.2	VCCorp Joint Stock Company	Bizfly Cloud Server	Bizfly Cloud Server	
4.3	VCCorp Joint Stock Company	Bizfly Kubernetes Engine	Bizfly Kubernetes Engine	
4.4	Quang Trung Software Park Development Company Limited (QTSC)	Private Cloud service integrating Infrastructure as Code (IaC)	Private Cloud with IaC	
Field 5: Tools and Applications
5.1	MK Group Joint Stock Company	M6 Advanced Biometric and Smart Card	M6 Reader	
5.2	FPT Corporation	Hi FPT Application	Hi FPT	
5.3	HPT Information Technology Services Joint Stock Company	HPT SmartNOC – Comprehensive, highly customizable IT system monitoring solution	HPT SmartNOC	
5.4	One Mount Consumer Joint Stock Company	OneU	OneU	
5.5	FPT Corporation	QaiDora Mask – Artificial intelligence application solution for editing and managing broadcast content	QAiDora Mask	
5.6	Thanh Long Technical Investment and Trading Joint Stock Company	S.TOUCH Solution – Electric Vehicle Charging Station	S.TOUCH	
Field 6: A-IoT
6.1	Vconnex Industrial Technology Joint Stock Company	AI Camera Hub V2	AI Camera Hub V2	
6.2	MOR Software Joint Stock Company	AI Solution Consulting Services	AI Solution Consulting Services	
6.3	Star Global Expert Solutions Joint Stock Company	3D/360 Smart Interactive Digital Map Ecosystem	3D/360 Smart Interactive Digital Map	
6.4	Joint Stock Commercial Bank for Investment and Development of Vietnam	Gen AI program supports searching for product and service information	Gen AI Platform	
6.5	MB Securities Joint Stock Company	Stock Mobile App – MBS Mobile App	MBS Mobile App	
6.6	Smartlog Supply Chain Solutions Joint Stock Company	Intelligent route planning system using artificial intelligence	SARP Solution	

Group 7: Innovation
No.	Company	Product/Service	Abbreviated Name	Ranking
7.1	Company NAVYCONS Construction Joint Stock Company	CONSMATERIAL Blockchain Platform for Traceability of Material Information and Management of Operations along the Value Chain	Conseco	5 stars
7.2	SKALE Joint Stock Company	SKALE Performance Management System	SKALE Performance	5 stars
7.3	GeneStory Joint Stock Company	Axiom VinGenChip: Low-cost genotyping chip for Vietnamese population based on microarray technology	Axiom VinGenChip	
7.4	SPN Telecommunication Solutions and Services Joint Stock Company	DEVZONE smart long range wifi automatic gate opener and close controller	Devzone smart gate controller	
7.5	GIMO Joint Stock Company	Geofencing Solutions	Geofencing	
7.6	University of Information and Communication Technology – Thai Nguyen University	iBLS Smart Blended Training Solution	iBLS	
7.7	InCard Technology Joint Stock Company	InCard Business Connection Software Platform	INCARD	
7.8	Think Group Technology & Media Joint Stock Company	Media Lab Advertising Platform	Media Lab	
7.9	GMO-Z.com RUNSYSTEM Joint Stock Company	MiraBOT – AI Chatbot Software	MiraBOT	
7.10	VIZION Technology Joint Stock Company	Smart 3D Tour with AI integration	Smart 3D AI Tour	
7.11	Joint Stock Commercial Bank for Investment and Development of Vietnam	Feng Shui & Astrology Accounts	Super Personalized Account	

Group 8: New Products, Solutions, Software, Services
No.	Company	Product/Service	Abbreviated Name	Ranking
1.1	GeneStory Joint Stock Company	Axiom VinGenChip: Low-cost genotyping chip for Vietnamese population based on microarray technology	Axiom VinGenChip	5 stars
1.2	BRAVO Software Joint Stock Company	BRAVO 10 ERP business management software	BRAVO 10 ERP	5 Stars
1.3	MK Vision Joint Stock Company	BodyWorn Camera (BWC)	BWC	5 stars
1.4	2ID Joint Stock Company	2Contract – Platform for authenticating, issuing CTS, signing and managing electronic contracts	2Contract	
1.5	SmartDev Company Limited	AI application solution development and consulting services from SmartDev and Verysell AI	AI Consulting & Solution Development	
1.6	Interspace Vietnam Company Limited	AMBASSADOR Software	AMBASSADOR	
1.7	Etinum Technology Joint Stock Company	ANTEDDA – New generation smart voltage stabilizer	ANTEDDA	
1.8	Joint Stock Commercial Bank for Investment and Development of Vietnam	Electronic bid security	eGP Connected Electronic Guarantee	
1.9	Vietnampedia Company Limited	Bizcom – Converged digital business management system	Bizcom	
1.10	BnK Solution Joint Stock Company	BnK IDP – Cognitive AI Document Processing	BnK Intelligent Document Processing	
1.11	ROBOWORLD Group Corporation	BubuSmart Smart Service Robot	BubuSmart	
1.12	TNTech Joint Stock Company	Customer experience management and optimization solution – C.Product	C.Product	
1.13	Cleeksy Joint Stock Company	Cleeksy Digital Operations Platform	Cleeksy DOP	
1.14	Vietnam Data Security Joint Stock Company (VNDS)	DataTrust – Personal Data Protection Compliance Platform	DataTrust	
1.15	Icetea Software Company Limited	Dlancer – Global job connection platform solution using blockchain	Dlancer Solution	
1.16	Ho Chi Minh City Development Joint Stock Commercial Bank	eCash – Cash collection solution via digital application	eCash	
1.17	Joint Stock Commercial Bank for Investment and Development of Vietnam	Electronic Identification for Institutional Customers (EKYC KHTC)	EKYC institutional clients	
1.18	IRTECH Technology Joint Stock Company	ERP AI – Pioneering solution for smart business management	ERP AI	
1.19	NexConstruct Joint Stock Company	InsightScanX – NexConstruct’s Intelligent Defect Management Solution for the Construction Industry	insightScanX	
1.20	Thien Minh Trading and Import Export Company Limited	Smart car screen AI ADAS UTOUR	Android AI ADAS UTOUR US Series Screen	
1.21	FPT Corporation	3P Continuous Glucose Monitor	3P meter	
1.22	Ho Chi Minh City Development Joint Stock Commercial Bank	MediPay smart medical kiosk solution	MediPay Kiosk	
1.23	FPT Corporation	Meduverse – Educational App for Kids	Meduverse	
1.24	Meey Land Group Joint Stock Company	Meey Atlas – Comprehensive digital map platform for Vietnamese people	Meey Atlas	
1.25	Interspace Vietnam Company Limited	MEGALIVE HUB software	MEGALIVE HUB	
1.26	ESIP Vietnam Technology Investment Joint Stock Company	MyKios Software	MyKios	
1.27	MARVY Group Technology Joint Stock Company	Octokit – Drag-and-drop game creation platform without coding with automated marketing gamification system	Octokit – Drag and Drop Game Creation Platform Without Coding	
1.28	SupremeTech Company Limited	OTTclouds – OTT, FAST Channel and VOD TV solutions on cloud platform	OTTclouds	
1.29	Vietnam Data Transmission Joint Stock Company	PetroPos Green Fuel Management Software	PetroPos	
1.30	IDT INC Technology Joint Stock Company	PharmaGo Software	PharmaGo – Store	
1.31	Vietnam Export Import Commercial Joint Stock Bank	BPM Business Process Management System	Business Process Management BPM	
1.32	PADITECH Vietnam Technology Joint Stock Company	SmartCV: Smart Human Resource Management Solution	SmartCV	
1.33	Tri An Investment and Trading Joint Stock Company	Gratitude – Taking care of your parents with you	THANK YOU	
1.34	Udata Joint Stock Company	Data Collection, Monitoring and Analysis Platform – Uboard	Uboard	
1.35	Joint Stock Commercial Bank for Investment and Development of Vietnam	Automatic salary advance loan solution	Automatic salary advance loan	
1.36	Joint Stock Commercial Bank for Foreign Trade of Vietnam	VCB Tablet – Flexible banking solution	VCB Tablet	
1.37	SmartDev Company Limited	Vera – Customer Care Solution with AI Agent	VERA	
1.38	Vietnam Joint Stock Commercial Bank for Industry and Trade	VietinBank digiGOLD	VietinBank digiGOLD	
1.39	TGL Solutions Joint Stock Company	VinaCDE – Data management and collaboration platform for the construction industry	VinaCDE	
1.40	Vietnam Payment Solutions Joint Stock Company	VNeDOC Electronic Document Solution	VNeDOC	
1.41	VNPT Information Technology Company – Branch of Vietnam Posts and Telecommunications Group	VNPT Green Digital Agriculture Ecosystem Platform	VNPT Green	
1.42	VNPT Information Technology Company – Branch of Vietnam Posts and Telecommunications Group	Platform for managing, analyzing and exploiting geospatial data	VNPT Maps Platform	

Group 9: Digital Services
No.	Company	Product/Service	Abbreviated Name	Ranking
Field 1: IT Services Export (ITO)
1.1	Kaopiz Holdings Joint Stock Company	Software Export Services	IT Outsourcing Service	
1.2	SmartDev Company Limited	Software Export Services	IT Outsourcing Service	
1.3	NashTech Vietnam	Software Development and Export Services	SD Service	
1.4	TGL Solutions Joint Stock Company	Software Export Service for Japanese Market	Software Export Services for Japan Market	
1.5	Adamo Software Joint Stock Company	Export Software Development Services	Software Outsourcing Service	
Field 2: Consulting, Software Development
2.1	Viettel Technology Investment Company Limited	Information Technology Services (ITO)	Software development services	
Field 3: Data and Process Digitization (BPO)
3.1	FPT Corporation	Digitalization Software – iSOMA	iSOMA	
3.2	Vietnam Bank for Agriculture and Rural Development	Digital solution for over-authorization credit approval process	Credit approval beyond authority	
Field 4: Digital Transformation Services
4.1	Military Commercial Joint Stock Bank	Digitalization and AI application in import LC	Fast and Easy LC online	
4.2	IPOS.VN Joint Stock Company	iPOS HRM: Specialized human resource management solution for the F&B industry	iPOS HRM	
4.3	Vietnam Digital Transformation Solutions Joint Stock Company	Martech Operations Services	Martech Operation	
4.4	SoftMart Software Joint Stock Company	FlexCollection – Debt Collection Software	Debt Management Software	
4.5	FOXAI Technology Joint Stock Company	SAP B1 Enterprise Management Solution Implementation Service	SAP B1 Service	
4.6	Viindoo Technology Joint Stock Company	Viindoo – Comprehensive Digital Transformation Strategy Consulting for Medium and Large Enterprises	Viindoo DX Strategy	
Field 5: Digital Utilities
5.1	Southeast Asia Commercial Joint Stock Bank	SeAMobile – Smart financial assistant	SeAMobile – Smart financial assistant	5 stars
5.2	Vietnam Bank for Agriculture and Rural Development	Agribank Plus	Agribank Plus	
5.3	Vietnam Joint Stock Commercial Bank for Industry and Trade	Online Disbursement Products	Online Disbursement	
Field 6: Digital Services
6.1	Quang Trung Software Park Development Company Limited (QTSC)	Information Security Solutions for Government IT Systems	Cyber Security Solution for government	
