= VNG Corporation =

Vietnamese technology company

- Trade name: VNG
- Native name: Công ty Cổ phần VNG
- Formerly: VinaGame
- Type: Joint Stock Company
- Traded as: HNX UPCoM: VNZ
- Industry: Internet information providers; Digital content; E-commerce; Gaming
- Founded: 9 September 2004; 21 years ago
- Headquarters: VNG Campus, Lot Z06, St. 13, Tân Thuận EPZ, Tân Thuận Ward, District 7, Ho Chi Minh City, Vietnam
- Key people: Le Hong Minh (founder & CEO); Vuong Quang Khai (co-founder of VNG, president of Zalo); Nguyen Le Thanh
- Products: Media and online games; Communication; Software; E-commerce
- Services: Financial connectivity; Payment platforms; Cloud services
- Revenue: ▲VNĐ 7.8 trillion (2022)
- Net income: ▼VNĐ 1.08 trillion (2022)
- Number of employees: 2700 (2018)
- Website: vng.com.vn

VNG Corporation (Vietnamese: Công ty cổ phần VNG, lit. 'VNG joint-stock company'), also recognized by its former brand name VinaGame (VNG), is a Vietnamese technology company founded in 2004. It specialises in digital content, online entertainment, social networking, and e-commerce. Its focus is on four main businesses, including online games, platforms, digital payments, and cloud services. VNG is responsible for the development of products such as Zalo, ZaloPay, Zing MP3, and 123phim.

According to the ASEAN Post, the company is "Vietnam's first ever unicorn start-up".

== Timeline ==
VNG was founded on 9 September 2004, under the name VinaGame.

- 2006–2007: The company focused on developing software products, such as "Internet Cyber Station Manager" (CSM) and 123mua.com.vn (e-commerce). They also developed web products under the Zing Brand—a comprehensive platform covering information, connection, and entertainment. In August 2008, Alexa ranked ZingMP3 the most popular listening and search tool for online music in Vietnam.
- 2008–2009: The company launches under the name VNG Corporation.
- 2010–2011: Created an online game called Thuận, which won the Sao Khue award in 2010 in the category of Products/Gaming Solutions and Electronic Entertainment. The Un In online game was exported to Japan.
- 2012–2013: Zalo, a mobile application for instant messaging and calls, reached 10 million users in 1.5 years.
- 2014: VNG was evaluated at 1 billion US dollars by World Startup Report and become the first and only unicorn startup in Vietnam.
- 2015: VNG was honored as "Global Fast-Growing Enterprise in East Asia" by the World Economic Forum (Manila, Philippines).
- 2016: VNG launched Zalopay—a mobile payment application.
- 2017: VNG was the first Vietnamese tech company to sign an MOU with the world's second-largest stock exchange, Nasdaq, to explore a US listing.
- 2018: VNG announced new strategic businesses, such as finance and payment and cloud services.
- 2024: At Vietnam GameVerse 2024, a gaming festival, VNG and Roblox announced their cooperation, making VNG the official publisher of Roblox in Vietnam.

== Data center ==
VNG has two tier-3 standard data centers, located in Ho Chi Minh City and Hanoi.

== Products and services ==
=== Digital content and online entertainment ===
==== Zuni online learning ====
Zuni is an online nonprofit educational project funded and operated by VNG and VNIF, which was officially published in March 2014.

==== Zing MP3 ====
Zing MP3, a music streaming service, was launched in August 2007. Its smartphone application went on to become one of the few most frequently downloaded apps in Vietnam.

=== Community connections ===
==== Zing Me social network ====
Zing Me was a social network operated by VNG, introduced in August 2009. It was integrated directly via the Zing system, with a variety of special applications like blogging, photo and music sharing, gaming, video clips, and email. In addition, Zing Me was the first social network in Vietnam that had the properties of a platform. In March 2010, it launched its first version for mobile phones. In 2020, the platform was shut down after long period of popularity decline.

==== Zalo ====
Zalo is a free message and call application on mobile and desktop, released on 8 August 2012 for iOS, Android, and Windows phones.

=== Finance ===
==== 123Pay ====
In 2010, VNG created the online payment platform 123Pay. It is the successor to and developed on the ZingPay platform, used for VNG's online games since 2005.

==== ZaloPay ====
ZaloPay is a digital and personal payment platform.

=== Software ===
==== CSM ====
Cyber Station Manager (CSM) is a free software from VNG for managing internet agencies. The first version of CSM was published on 2 February 2006.

=== Cloud services ===
- Full-stack cloud services for organizations and businesses, with smart tech solutions linked through internet connection and cloud technology.

== Legal issues ==
On 23 and 24 February 2009, inspectors discovered software copyright infringement worth VND 5 billion (around US$295,000) during a sudden raid on Vinagame headquarters in Ho Chi Minh City.

In August 2020, VNG sued TikTok for $9.5 million, alleging copyright infringement.

== Recognition ==
In April 2014, VNG received the "Third-class Labor Medal", signed by the president of Vietnam and awarded by the prime minister to Lê Hồng Minh, VNG's chairman and CEO.
