= University of Information Technology =

Public university in Ho Chi Minh City, Vietnam

Coordinates: 10.870778°N 106.803611°E

VNU-HCM University of Information Technology
- Trường Đại học Công nghệ Thông tin, Đại học Quốc gia Thành phố Hồ Chí Minh
- Type: Public university
- Established: June 8, 2006; 20 years ago
- Parent institution: Vietnam National University, Ho Chi Minh City
- Rector: Nguyễn Hoàng Tú Anh
- Location: Quarter 34, Linh Xuan Ward, Ho Chi Minh City, Vietnam
- Campus: Suburban, 12.3 hectares
- Website: www.uit.edu.vn

The University of Information Technology (UIT; Vietnamese: Trường Đại học Công nghệ thông tin, Đại học Quốc gia Thành phố Hồ Chí Minh), or VNU-HCM University of Information Technology, is a public university located in Ho Chi Minh City, Vietnam, a member of Vietnam National University, Ho Chi Minh City. Although its name is about information technology, this university teaches many computer studies. The first course was inaugurated on 6 November 2006.

== History ==
The predecessor of this university was Center for IT Development. On 8 June 2006, the Vietnamese prime minister signed Decision no. 134/2006/QĐ-TT to establish this university.

== Academic programs ==
Undergraduate programs

- Computer Sciences
- Data Science
- Information Systems
- Computer Engineering
- Electronic Commerce
- Computer Networks and Communications
- Software Engineering
- Information Technology
- Information Security
- Artificial Intelligence
- VLSI Design

Graduate programs:

- Computer Sciences
- Information Systems
- Information Security
- Information Technology

== Research fields ==
- Knowledge Engineering
- Signal Processing
- Computer Network Protocols
- Network Security
- Multimedia Processing
- Mobile Network
- Embedded & VLSI Design
- IoT & Robotics
- Geographic Information Systems(GIS)

== See also ==
- University of Information Technology in Warsaw (now VIZJA University)
