= FPT Corporation =

Vietnamese information technology corporation

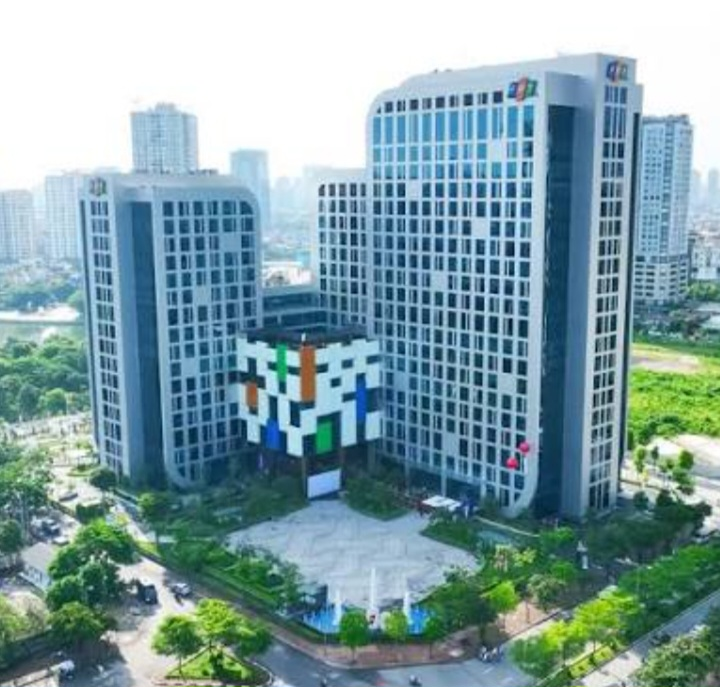
- Native name: Công ty Cổ phần FPT
- Type: Public
- Traded as: HOSE: FPT
- Industry: Information technology, Telecommunications, Education
- Founded: 13 September 1988; 38 years ago
- Founders: Trương Gia Bình and 12 others
- Headquarters: FPT Tower, No. 10 Pham Van Bach, Cầu Giấy, Hanoi, Vietnam
- Area served: Worldwide
- Key people: Trương Gia Bình (Chairman); Nguyễn Văn Khoa (CEO)
- Products: IT services, software outsourcing, cloud and AI services, telecommunications, education
- Revenue: ▲VND70.1 trillion (2025)
- Number of employees: 88,553 (July 2026)
- Subsidiaries: FPT Software; FPT University
- Website: fpt.com

FPT Corporation , commonly known as FPT, is a Vietnamese multinational information technology company headquartered in Hanoi. Founded in 1988, it operates in three sectors: technology, telecommunications and education. Its largest business is IT services for overseas clients, delivered mainly through its subsidiary FPT Software, with Japan as its biggest foreign market. In 2023, FPT became the first Vietnam-headquartered technology company to earn US$1 billion in a year from global IT services. As of 2024, it employed more than 80,000 people across 30 countries and territories. FPT has been listed on the Ho Chi Minh City Stock Exchange since 2006.

The name FPT originally stood for Food Processing Technology and later for Financing and Promoting Technology.

== History ==
=== Founding and early years (1988–2001) ===
FPT was founded on 13 September 1988 as the Food Processing Technology Company (Công ty Công nghệ Thực phẩm) by a group of 13 scientists led by Trương Gia Bình.

The company's first major contract, worth US$1 million, was an exchange of computers for equipment with the Soviet Academy of Sciences, which led to a relationship with the computer maker Olivetti. In 1990, the company was renamed the Corporation for Financing and Promoting Technology, keeping the acronym FPT, and it moved into computer distribution and system integration for the domestic market.

In 1997, FPT was one of the first four companies licensed to provide internet services in Vietnam, the year the internet became available to the public in the country. FPT Software was founded on 13 January 1999 to provide software outsourcing services. In February 2001, FPT launched the online newspaper VnExpress.

=== Equitization and listing (2002–2008) ===
FPT became a joint-stock company in 2002, following a decision of the Prime Minister dated 28 February 2002. In November 2005, FPT Software set up a subsidiary in Japan, FPT Japan. Revenue from Japan grew from US$5.4 million in 2005 to US$62 million in 2014.

On 8 September 2006, the Prime Minister approved the establishment of FPT University, a private university founded by the company. In October 2006, FPT received a US$36.5 million investment from TPG, through its TPG Ventures fund, and Intel Capital. In November 2006, it signed a three-year strategic alliance with Microsoft, extending an earlier memorandum of understanding. FPT shares began trading on the Ho Chi Minh City Stock Exchange on 13 December 2006, making it the first Vietnamese IT company to list on the stock market.

In October 2008, the company changed its English name to FPT Corporation. At the end of 2008, it reported total revenue of US$1 billion, with more than 9,000 employees.

=== International expansion (2009–2018) ===
In June 2014, FPT agreed to buy RWE IT Slovakia from the German energy group RWE, the first overseas acquisition by a Vietnamese ICT company.

In 2017, FPT reduced its holdings in its retail and distribution businesses. It sold 30% of FPT Retail to funds associated with VinaCapital and Dragon Capital, and 47% of its distribution arm FPT Trading to Synnex. Both companies then became associates of FPT rather than subsidiaries. FPT Retail, founded in 2012, was listed on the Ho Chi Minh City Stock Exchange in April 2018.

=== 2019–present ===
Nguyễn Văn Khoa became chief executive on 29 March 2019, succeeding Bùi Quang Ngọc. In 2020, FPT joined Keidanren, the Japan Business Federation.

During the 2020s, FPT made a series of acquisitions and investments abroad and at home. These included a majority stake in the Vietnamese software company Base.vn in 2021, an investment in the US firm Intertec International from 2021 followed by the purchase of its IT services division, the US product engineering firm Cardinal Peak and an 80% stake in the French IT consultancy AOSIS in 2023, the Japanese company NAC in 2024, and the German energy-sector IT consultancy David Lamm Consulting in 2025. In October 2023, FPT became one of the major investors in the US company Landing AI. In December 2023, it launched an automotive technology subsidiary, FPT Automotive, in Texas.

In December 2023, FPT announced that its revenue from global IT services had passed US$1 billion for the first time. Its revenue from the Japanese market passed US$500 million in 2024.

FPT's semiconductor subsidiary released its first chips in August 2022. The chips, intended for medical IoT devices, were designed in Vietnam and manufactured in South Korea. In January 2026, FPT announced plans for a chip testing and packaging plant in Bắc Ninh province.

In April 2024, FPT announced a US$200 million investment in an artificial intelligence factory using Nvidia chips. The FPT AI Factory was launched in Japan and Vietnam in November 2024. In April 2025, SBI Holdings and Sumitomo each acquired a 20% stake in FPT Smart Cloud Japan, with FPT keeping 60%. By mid-2026, the AI Factory clusters in Vietnam and Japan had reached more than 90% utilisation.

In June 2024, a rise in its share price made FPT the largest private conglomerate in Vietnam by market capitalisation, and the third most valuable listed company after Vietcombank and BIDV. The share price later fell from a peak reached in January 2025, and by July 2026 FPT was no longer among the ten largest listed companies by market value. In September 2026, FPT was added to the FTSE Global All Cap index.

In June 2026, during a visit to Hanoi by Thai Prime Minister Anutin Charnvirakul, FPT signed memoranda of understanding with the Thai companies AMATA Group and CP Group on smart industrial estates and artificial intelligence.

== Business ==
FPT reports its results in three segments: technology, telecommunications and education. In 2025, the technology segment accounted for 63% of group revenue.

=== Technology ===
The technology segment includes IT services for overseas clients, led by FPT Software, and IT services and digital transformation for clients in Vietnam. In 2025, overseas IT services earned revenue of VND35,382 billion, up 14.3% year on year, and newly signed overseas contracts were worth more than US$1.5 billion. Japan is the largest overseas market.

=== Telecommunications ===
FPT Telecom, which received one of the first internet service licences in Vietnam in 1997, provides internet and related services. In 2025, the telecommunications segment earned revenue of VND18,702 billion. In July 2025, the state's controlling stake in FPT Telecom was transferred from the State Capital Investment Corporation to the Ministry of Public Security. As a result, from 1 January 2026, FPT no longer consolidates FPT Telecom in its financial statements and instead accounts for its share of the company's profit.

=== Education ===
FPT's education business includes FPT University, established in 2006. Since 2019, FPT University has run joint programmes with Swinburne University of Technology in Hanoi. The education segment earned revenue of VND7,009 billion in 2025.

=== Associates ===
Since 2017, FPT has held minority stakes in the retailer FPT Retail and the distributor FPT Trading (now Synnex FPT), which it accounts for as associates.

== Leadership ==
Trương Gia Bình is the chairman of FPT. Nguyễn Văn Khoa has been chief executive since 2019.

Chief executives of FPT
Name	Term
Trương Gia Bình	1988–2009
Nguyễn Thành Nam	2009–2011
Trương Đình Anh	2011–2012
Trương Gia Bình (interim)	2012–2013
Bùi Quang Ngọc	2013–2019
Nguyễn Văn Khoa	2019–present

== Financial performance ==
Consolidated revenue and profit before tax (billion VND)
Year	Revenue	Profit before tax	Source
2018	23,214	3,852	
2019	27,717	4,665	
2020	29,830	5,260	
2021	35,657	6,335	
2022	44,010	7,661	
2023	52,618	9,203	
2024	62,849	11,071	
2025	70,113	13,039	

Figures from 2026 onward exclude FPT Telecom, which is no longer consolidated, and are not directly comparable with earlier years. In the first half of 2026, FPT reported revenue of about VND26 trillion and profit before tax of VND5.7 trillion.
