= Cốc Cốc =

Vietnamese web browser and search engine

- Cốc Cốc Browser on Windows 11
- Developer: Cốc Cốc Company
- Release: 14 May 2013

Stable release(s)
- Windows 123.0.168 (November 24, 2023; 2 years ago) macOS 95.0.4638.88 (December 12, 2021; 4 years ago) iOS 102.0.34 (December 24, 2021; 4 years ago) Android (varies with device) (December 25, 2021; 4 years ago) Microsoft Store (Xbox One, Windows 10, Windows 8 Mobile) 95.0.214 (May 1, 2021; 5 years ago) [±]
- Written in: C++, Assembly, Python, JavaScript, Java
- Engine: Chromium open source code
- Operating system: Android and later; iOS 15 or later; Linux; macOS or later; Windows 10 or later; Xbox One; Windows 10 on ARM version 14393.0 or higher
- Platform: IA-32, X86-64
- Included with: Android Jelly Bean or later
- Available in: Vietnamese, English
- Type: Web browser, mobile browser
- License: Freeware
- Website: coccoc.com

Cốc Cốc browser (Vietnamese: [kəwk˧˥ kəwk˧˥]; meaning "knock knock" and previously Cờ Rôm+ Vietnamese: [kə̀ː rōm kəwŋ˨˩˨]; lit. 'Chrome+') is a freeware web browser focused on the Vietnamese market, developed by Vietnamese company Coc Coc Company Ltd and based on Chromium. Cốc Cốc is available for Windows, Windows Phone, Android, and macOS operating systems and supports both English and Vietnamese. Cốc Cốc also has its own search engine.

== History ==
Cốc Cốc was founded in 2008 by iTim Technologies LLC owned by Victor Lavrenko, a Soviet-born Israeli entrepreneur, the founding CTO of Mail.ru, and founder and CEO of the Russian search engine Nigma, along with Vietnamese co-founders Lê Văn Thanh, Nguyễn Thanh Bình, and Nguyễn Đức Ngọc. Lavrenko leveraged his experience from Mail.ru and Nigma, with the initial goal of dominating the Vietnamese market as a search engine. The Vietnamese co-founders concentrated on developing Vietnamese language-related features, including algorithm improvements, product management, and operational functions.

Two months after the official release, the number of Cốc Cốc users in Vietnam surpassed Opera, Safari and Internet Explorer.

On 2 April 2014, Cờ Rôm+ was officially re-branded as the Cốc Cốc browser to unify the company's brands under that name: Cốc Cốc Search Engine, Cốc Cốc browser and Nhà Nhà mobile app.

In October 2017, Cốc Cốc reached over 22 million users and ranked as the second most popular browser in Vietnam after Google Chrome. Its market share would decline shortly after.

In December 2025, the total market share of Cốc Cốc is 4.42%, while Google Chrome hold a 67.42% share.

== Features ==
Cốc Cốc has a mechanism to perform reverse domain name resolution, allowing for the DNS-based blocking of websites (such as Facebook). This feature debuted on 14 May 2013, in the first official release of the browser.

Cốc Cốc is capable of automatically adding lingual tone to Vietnamese text. It allows the user to enter Vietnamese text without the need for applications like Unikey, EVkey and Vietkey. When encounter text without tone, Cốc Cốc will suggest the most likely variants of tone arrangements, once processed on the Cốc Cốc server. Cốc Cốc also incorporates an English-Vietnamese dictionary, assisting English learners or international newspaper subscribers from elementary to the advanced level. The browser also support double-clicking an English word to opens a small box with its meaning and pronunciation.

Cốc Cốc includes a tool to detect downloadable media and provide a button to download them in the toolbar. Except for several premium websites, all popular streaming websites such as YouTube and Dailymotion are downloadable on the browser.

== Market share in Vietnam ==
In November 2014, Cốc Cốc surpassed the Firefox browser in desktop usage, becoming the second most popular browser in Vietnam with a market share of 18.25%.

In August 2017, Cốc Cốc reached its peak market share in desktop usage, achieving 32.54%. However, its market share began to decline thereafter. By August 2020, its share had dropped to 16.42%.

In December 2024, the total market share of Cốc Cốc is 4.09%, while Google Chrome hold a 62.9% share.

In December 2025, the total market share of Cốc Cốc is 4.42%, while Google Chrome hold a 67.42% share.
