= Vietnam Association for Anti-Counterfeiting and Trademark Protection =

- Abbreviation: VATAP
- Type: Professional association
- Legal status: Legal, active
- Headquarters: No. 91 Đinh Tiên Hoàng Street, Hoàn Kiếm District, Hanoi City
- Region served: Vietnam
- Official language: Vietnamese
- President: Nguyễn Đăng Sinh

The Vietnam Association for Anti-Counterfeiting and Trademark Protection (VATAP) is a non-profit professional social organization for individuals, organizations, and businesses operating in various fields of production and business in Vietnam.

== History ==
On September 22, 2015, in Hanoi, the Vietnam Association for Anti-Counterfeiting and Trademark Protection (VATAP) announced the establishment of the Business Consulting, Support, and Brand Development Center (GBC). According to Mr. Lê Thế Bảo, President of VATAP, businesses play a very important role and therefore need to cooperate with regulatory bodies and enforcement agencies to fight against the issues of counterfeit and fake goods. Businesses are the ones who understand the fight against smuggling and counterfeit goods better than anyone else, but many businesses are still hesitant. While they do not refuse to cooperate, they are not enthusiastic. Therefore, the establishment of GBC will contribute to consulting and supporting businesses.

== Controversy ==
=== The incident of counterfeit goods being awarded the Top 10 Leading Brands of 2017. ===
In October 2017, the Vietnam Association for Anti-Counterfeiting and Trademark Protection awarded the "Top 10 Outstanding Vietnamese Brands and Leading Business Figures of 2017" to several companies, including Vinaca Co., Ltd. located in Thanh Xuan District, Hanoi. The Anti-Counterfeiting Association ambiguously awarded the "Outstanding Vietnamese" title, even though only a few units contributed money and participated in the evaluation, which was not enough to represent the hundreds of thousands of businesses across the country. On the other hand, the certificate for the VINACA brand had signatures and a red seal from figures within the Association, including individuals from the Anti-Counterfeiting Institute under VATAP, the Business Consulting and Brand Development Center under VATAP – the co-organizing unit, and the Editorial Board of the Goods and Brand Magazine, also under the Association, which served as the media sponsor.

By April 2018, the Kiến An District Police and the Market Management Department of Hải Phòng City inspected the production facility of Vinaca Co., Ltd. in Kiến An and discovered that the company was filling bamboo charcoal powder into capsule shells to create fake cancer medicine. Among these products was "Vinaca Ung Thư Co3," which was advertised as highly effective in supporting cancer treatment.

=== The Event of the Vice President of the Anti-Counterfeiting Association Using a Fake Degree ===
In August 2018, a man, who was considered to have a university degree, was appointed as the Vice President of VATAP for the IV term (2016 - 2021). The degree he presented was a "high-ranking pharmacist degree, Class B, certificate number A856341 issued in 2008." When he invited businesses to attend the conference "Protecting and Developing Business Brands in the Context of Integration" organized by VATAP on September 28, 2018, in Ben Tre Province, some people suspected that he was a fraud. The representative agency of the Goods and Brand Magazine in the South sent an official letter requesting Hanoi University of Pharmacy to verify his degree. On November 29, 2018, the university responded in writing, confirming that "no university degree in pharmacy was issued to him...". This means he was indeed a counterfeit.
