= Vietnam Software Association =

Vietnamese software business association

The Vietnam Software Association (or Vietnam Software & IT Services Association), known for short as VINASA, is a software business association headquartered in Hanoi Software Centre, Hanoi, Vietnam. It was established in 2002. In 2005, they signed a cooperation agreement with the Japan External Trade Organization (JETRO). Among other activities, they organise an annual software contest; in 2006, they gave out 36 prizes to various individuals and organisations.

Currently, Vinasa has approximately 590 members, including IT centers and companies across Vietnam.

== Vinasa members ==
#	Company	Address
	FPT Joint Stock Company	No. 10 Pham Van Bach Street, Dich Vong Ward, Cau Giay District, Hanoi city, Vietnam
	CMC Group Joint Stock Company	No. 10 Pham Van Bach Street, Dich Vong Ward, Cau Giay District, Hanoi city, Vietnam
	FPT Software Company Limited	FPT Tower, 10 Pham Van Bach, Dich Vong Ward, Cau Giay District, Hanoi
	CIC Technology and Consulting Joint Stock Company	CIC-CDC Building, No. 37 Le Dai Hanh, Le Dai Hanh Ward, Hai Ba Trung, Hanoi
	Hai Hoa Software Technology Joint Stock Company	2nd Floor, Technosoft Building, No. 8, Lane 15, Duy Tan Street, Dich Vong Hau Ward, Cau Giay District, Hanoi City
	ADCOM Technology Development & Consulting Co., Ltd. ADCOM Group Company	Giang Vo Lake View Building, D10 Giang Vo, Ba Dinh District, Hanoi City
	Tinh Van Technology Joint Stock Company	T.8 Sports Hotel, Hacinco Student Village, Thanh Xuan, Hanoi
	MISA Joint Stock Company	9th floor, Technosoft building, Duy Tan street, Dich Vong Hau ward, District 1.Cau Giay, Hanoi
	Tien Phong Company Limited	Room 1604, OCT3A building, HandiResco urban area, Pham Van Dong street, Co ward Nhue 2, Bac Tu Liem District, Hanoi
	Commercial IT Software Joint Stock Company	No. 14, Lane 158 Ngoc Ha - Ngoc Ha Ward - Ba Dinh District - Hanoi
	Electronics and Telecommunications Technology Investment and Development Joint Stock Company	Elcom Building, Lane 15 Duy Tan, Dich Vong, Cau Giay, Hanoi
	CMC Technology and Solutions Corporation Limited	16th Floor, CMC Tower, 11 Duy Tan, Dich Vong Hau Ward, Cau District, Hanoi City
	CMC Group Joint Stock Company	CMC Tower Building, Pham Hung Street, Cau Giay District, Hanoi
	Technology and Environment Informatics Joint Stock Company - VINACOMIN - Group Vietnam Coal - Mineral Industry	B15 Dai Kim, Hoang Mai, Hanoi
	Trust Company Limited (NTC)	8th Floor, Building 142 Doi Can, Ba Dinh, Hanoi
	MK Smart Joint Stock Company	The Vista Building - No. 4 - Alley 15 - Duy Tan Street - Cau Giay - Hanoi
	Software Development and Training Company Limited (eDT)	No. 17, Lane 294/2 Kim Ma, Ba Dinh, Hanoi
	Postal Telecommunications and Informatics Joint Stock Company (CTIN)	158/2 Hong Mai, Bach Mai, Hai Ba Trung, Hanoi
	Sao Mai Software Joint Stock Company	Lucky building, 4th floor, 81 Tran Thai Tong, Cau Giay, Hanoi
	Electricity Telecommunications and Information Technology Company	T.16 -18, Tower A, No. 11 Cua Bac, Ba Dinh, Hanoi
	VITEC Training Center	3rd Floor, HBI Incubation Center Building, Hoa Lac Hi-Tech Park Management Board, Km 29 Thang Long Freeway, Thach That, Hanoi
	FSC Electronics and Informatics Joint Stock Company	12A04, Building 17T8, Hoang Dao Thuy, Nhan Chinh, Thanh Xuan, Hanoi.
	Nhat Hai Technology Project Joint Stock Company	No. 14 Lot 11A, Trung Hoa, Cau Giay, Hanoi
	Petrolimex Informatics and Telecommunications Joint Stock Company (PIACOM)	T.15, Detech Building, 8C Ton That Thuyet, My Dinh, Nam Tu Liem, Ha Noi
	Commercial Software Solutions Joint Stock Company (Esoft)	T.4, No. 9 Nguyen Dinh Chieu, Hai Ba Trung, Hanoi
	NEO Technology and Communications Development Investment Joint Stock Company	2nd Floor, CT2 Trang An Complex, No. 1 Phung Chi Kien, Nghia Do, Cau, Hanoi
	Luvina Software Joint Stock Company	Ward 4, Hoa Binh Tower, 106 Hoang Quoc Viet, Cau Giay, Hanoi
	GMO Joint Stock Company – Z.com RUNSYSTEM	T.6, Ocean Park Building, No. 1 Dao Duy Anh, Dong Da, Hanoi
	Automation - Control Software Joint Stock Company (CADPRO)	No. 11 Chau Long, Ba Dinh, Hanoi
	Aprotrain Application Training Joint Stock Company	4th Floor, Building 285 Doi Can, Ba Dinh, Hanoi
	iNET Communications Joint Stock Company	No. 247 Cau Giay, Dich Vong Ward, Cau Giay District, Ha City Noi, Vietnam
	UDIC Technology Solutions Joint Stock Company	Floor 24, Tower A, Song Da Building - Pham Hung, Nam Tu Liem, Hanoi
	Viet International Software Joint Stock Company (VSII)	3rd Floor CenXSpac, Tower 3-4 Dolphin Plaza, 28 Tran Binh, My Dinh 2, Nam Tu Liem, Hanoi, Vietnam
	VMG Media Joint Stock Company	6th floor, Peakview building, 36 Hoang Cau, O Cho Dua ward, Dong Da district, Hanoi city
	Silver Sea Software Investment and Development Joint Stock Company	T.2, An Phu Building, No. 24 Hoang Quoc Viet, Cau Giay, Hanoi
	BIP SYSTEMS Vietnam Company Limited	Room 403, Ward 4, DMC Building, No. 535 Kim Ma, Ba Dinh, Hanoi
	FPT Telecommunications Joint Stock Company	9th floor, building A, FPT Tower, 10 Pham Van Bach, Dich Vong, Cau Giay, Hanoi
	Viet Nhat General Joint Stock Company	14th floor, ICON4 Tower building, 243A La Thanh, Lang Thuong, Dong Da, Hanoi
	VNEXT HOLDINGS Joint Stock Company	18th Floor, Tower C, Centralpoint Building, No. 219 Trung Kinh, Cau Giay, Ha Noi
	Vietnam Payment Technology Joint Stock Company (VINA Pay)	T.11, TTC Building, Duy Tan, Dich Vong Hau, Cau Giay, Hanoi
	August Application & Technology Joint Stock Company	Room 701, Kim Anh Building, Lane 78 Duy Tan, Cau Giay, Hanoi
	Thai Son Technology Development Company Limited	B1-Tuoi Tre, Hoang Quoc Viet, Cau Giay, Hanoi
	Southeast Asia Solutions Joint Stock Company	No. 26, Lane 61/21, Pham Tuan Tai Street, Co Nhue 1 Ward, Bac Tu District Liem, Hanoi
	Tan A Chau Automation Equipment and Technology Company Limited	Room 501, CT8D, Duong Noi Apartment, Ha Dong, Hanoi.
	Institute of Business Informatics - Vietnam Chamber of Commerce and Industry	Ward 4, No. 9 Dao Duy Anh, Dong Da, Hanoi
	VCCorp Joint Stock Company	No. 1 Nguyen Huy Tuong Street, Thanh Xuan Trung Ward, Thanh District Xuan, Hanoi, Vietnam
	A.N.Lab Joint Stock Company	Ward 8, Building 18-4, No. 8, Pham Hung, Cau Giay, Hanoi
	USOL Vietnam Company Limited	T.20, Hoa Binh Tower, 106 Hoang Quoc Viet, Cau Giay, Hanoi
	Hiker Games Joint Stock Company	35 Ward Le Van Thiem, Thanh Xuan Trung, Thanh Xuan, Hanoi
	Quality Consulting and Technology Development Company Limited	Ward 6 Office Area, Building 34 JSC, No. 164 Khuat Duy Tien, Hanoi
	Minh Phuc Company Limited	10th Floor, Sudico Building, Me Tri Urban Area, My Dinh, Tu Liem, Hanoi
	Advanced Technology Joint Stock Company	B20, Lot 19 Dinh Cong New Urban Area, Dinh Cong Ward, Hoang Mai District, Ha Noi.
	M-PAY Technology and Trade Services Joint Stock Company	T.18, VTC Online Building, No. 18 Tam Trinh, Minh Khai, HBT, Hanoi
	NTT DATA VDS Company Limited	T.12, Thang Long Building, No. 98A Nguy Nhu Kon Tum, Hanoi
	Hoa Binh Software Solutions Joint Stock Company (PeaceSoft)	T.12A VTC Online Building, No. 18 Tam Trinh, Hai Ba Trung, Hanoi
	Nam Viet Software Solutions and Services Joint Stock Company (NaviSoft)	2nd Floor, Building 262 Nguyen Huy Tuong, Thanh Xuan Trung, Thanh Xuan, Hanoi
	FPT IS Company Limited	No. 10 Pham Van Bach Street, Dich Vong Ward, Cau Giay District, River Noi, Vietnam
	Centech Communications Joint Stock Company	504A Ford Thang Long building, 105 Lang Ha, Dong Da, Hanoi
	Savvycom Joint Stock Company	7th floor, Tower B Skypark, No. 3 Ton That Thuyet, Dich Vong Ward Hau, Cau Giay district, Hanoi city
	Viettel Telecommunications Software Center	Glight Building, Ward 3, CT2 Trung Van, Le Van Luong extension, My Dinh
	Information Services and Technology Transfer Business Company Limited	T.8-9, Building No. 7, Lane 1160 Lang Street, Dong Da, Hanoi
	SPI Vietnam Company Limited	Room 303, Ward 3, DETECH Building, No. 15 Pham Hung, My Dinh, Tu Liem, Hanoi
	Vietnam Education Joint Stock Company	No. 451 Hoang Quoc Viet, Cau Giay, Hanoi
	BuCA Joint Stock Company	7th Floor, MD Complex Building, 68 Nguyen Co Thach, My Dinh 1, Hanoi
	QSOFT Vietnam Joint Stock Company	47 Street 23, Giao Luu City Urban Area, Co Nhue 2 Ward, Bac Tu Liem District, Hanoi City
	METRIXA Technology Company Limited	4th Floor, Technosoft Building, Duy Tan, Dich Vong Hau, Cau Giay, Hanoi
	HOSCO Joint Stock Company	Room 816, CT5 Building, My Dinh-Song Da Urban Area, Pham Hung, Hanoi
	Thien Hoang Solution Joint Stock Company	T.2 Licogi 13 Building, 164 Khuat Duy Tien, Thanh Xuan, Hanoi
	EFY Vietnam Information Technology Joint Stock Company	9th floor, Sannam building, 78 Duy Tan, Dich Vong Hau ward, Hanoi
	Cisco Systems Vietnam Co., Ltd	Room 2301-2305, Building 72 Keang Nam Hanoi, Pham Hung, Cau
	Thang Long University	Nghiem Xuan Yem Street, Dai Kim, Hoang Mai, Hanoi
	SSI Software Company Limited	No. 37, Group 13, Cau Dien, Tu Liem, Hanoi
	VKX Company Limited	No. 138 Ngoc Hoi, Hoang Liet, Hoang Mai, Hanoi
	NTQ Solution Joint Stock Company	10th Floor, Song Da Building (HH4 Tower), 18 Pham Hung, My Dinh, Ha Noi.
	Viet Ba IT Joint Stock Company	89 Luong Dinh Cua, Dong Da, Hanoi
	Fujitsu Vietnam Co., Ltd	Unit 01-03, Floor 17, Keangnam Ha Noi Landmark Tower, E6, Pham Hung, Hanoi
	Newwave Solution Joint Stock Company	4th Floor - MITEC Building, Lot E2 Cau Giay New Urban Area, Yen Hoa, Cau Giay, Hanoi

== See also ==
- Vietnam Association for Anti-Counterfeiting and Trademark Protection
