= FPT Software =

Vietnamese software company

FPT Software Company Limited
- Trade name: FPT Software
- Company type: Subsidiary
- Industry: Software
- Founded: 1999
- Number of locations: 80
- Area served: Global
- Key people: Pham Minh Tuan, Chief Executive Officer
- Number of employees: 30,000 (2024)
- Parent: FPT Corporation
- Website: Official website

FPT Software Company Limited (Vietnamese: Công ty Trách nhiệm Hữu hạn Phần mềm FPT) is a subsidiary of FPT Corporation headquartered in Hanoi, Vietnam. It focuses on outsourced software development.

The company was founded in 1998. The company focused on basic programming work and software testing. A majority of its work in Japan was for Hitachi. In 2002, it got its first big project implementing the Solomon Enterprise Management System in a $2 million project. FPT Software grew from 350 employees in 2003 to 1,000 by 2005 and 2,700 by 2009. From 2008 to 2012, it expanded operations in Europe with its first offices in France and Germany. The company also expanded operations in the United States with its first office in Richardson, Texas. By this time, it had more than $42 million in annual revenues and 2,700 employees.

The Japan subsidiary started with three employees in 2005. It grew to 1,500 employees and 12 offices by 2021. It opened a new office in Ho Chi Minh City in Southern Vietnam in 2011, and continued to expand to more offices over time. Around 2020, it opened locations in India and Costa Rica. By 2023, FPT Software had 28,000 employees working in 30 countries and had $800 million in annual revenues.

FPT Software is the largest employer of software programmers in Vietnam. In 2006, it created a school for programming called FPT University that grew to 16,000 students by 2017. It has 21 divisions located in three cities in Vietnam: Hanoi, Da Nang, and Ho Chi Minh City. The business provides outsourced software development with its largest market being in Japan. It works on things like enterprise resource planning software, IT migrations, and designing circuits.
