= Vietnamese comics =

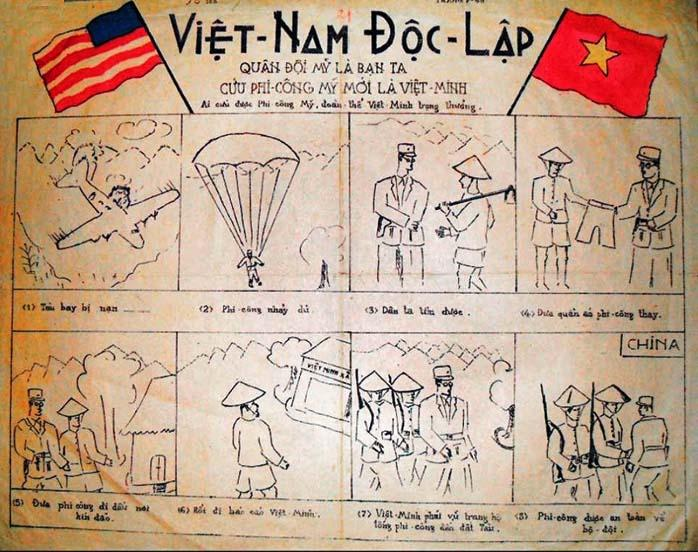
A propaganda poster of Việt Minh during World War II, showed the Vietnamese what they should do when they meet an American.

Viet comics (Vietnamese: Truyện tranh Việt, [t̠͡ʂwiən˧˨ʔˈ t̠͡ʂaɲ˧˧ viət˺˧˨]), also known as mạn họa or manhoa (Vietnamese pronunciation: [man˧˧ hwaː˧˨ʔ˩], Sino-Vietnamese for manhua, Chinese: 漫畫), are comics or graphic novels originating from Vietnam. The term Viet comics was firstly introduced by Floral Age Bimonthly (Bán nguyệt san Tuổi Hoa) magazine in 1960 in Saigon.

Before the 1990s, mạn họa were not used for entertaining purposes. Instead, due to long-standing influence of Chinese Confucianism, Vietnamese comics at the time often had educational contents with lessons about morality. This, however, had prevented them from reaching a broad readership due to storylines remaining unchanged.

In 1992, Kim Đồng Publishing House printed the first Japanese manga in Vietnam: Doraemon. It became a phenomenon and was quickly followed by other Japanese manga, such as Sailor Moon and Dragon Ball. And with that, the Vietnamese comics were defeated right at their doorstep. It was not until 2002, when Thần đồng Đất Việt was published, that a truyện tranh managed to gain popularity.

== Etymology ==
The term "truyện tranh" 傳幀 is a compound word between truyện 傳 (meaning "story") and tranh 幀 (meaning “drawing"). Older generation usually perceive that the "stories with pictures" are for children. Because of this, the idea of comics for adults is alien in the country, and many authors had faced backlash when their comics were deemed unsuitable for children.

== History ==
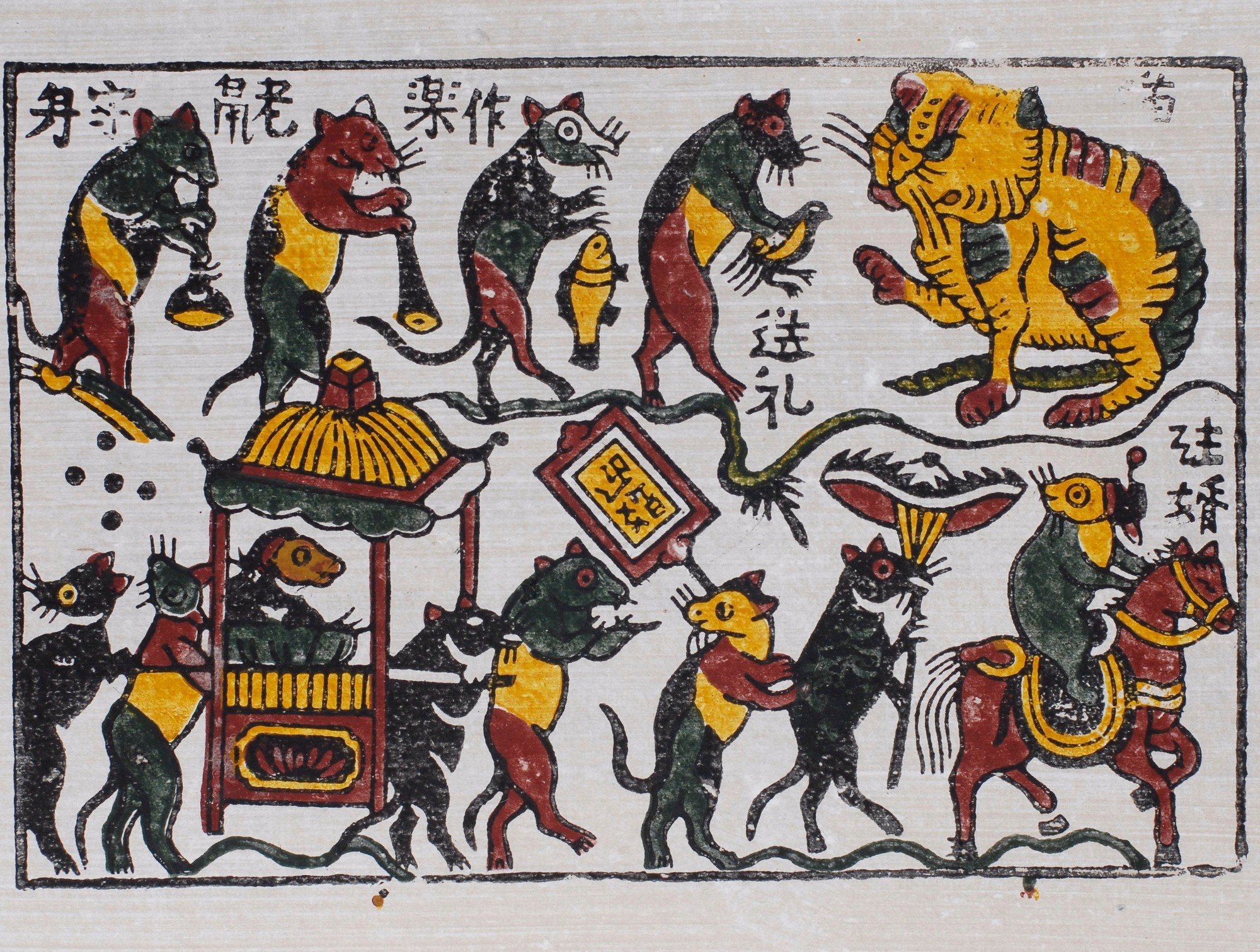
“The Rat’s Wedding” tells a story about a rat family who was forced to pay tribute to a cat in order to be allowed to organize the wedding.

Comics started to appear in Vietnam in the 1930s. However, the idea of using pictures to tell stories dated back far more than that with the Đông Hồ painting, influenced by China and sometimes India. This type of painting illustrated philosophy or stories and were printed using woodcuts.

During the colonial era, paper printing technology developed enough that books and newspapers became more common. Vietnamese comics at the time were mainly published in the form of albums in newspapers. They had various themes and were used to entertain, educate, or propagate the people.

In the 1930s, Vietnamese comics became an independent art with numerous artists and readers. Many weekly newspapers also published sequential drawings that often satirized Annamese writers and the Indochinese government, especially the Governors-General.

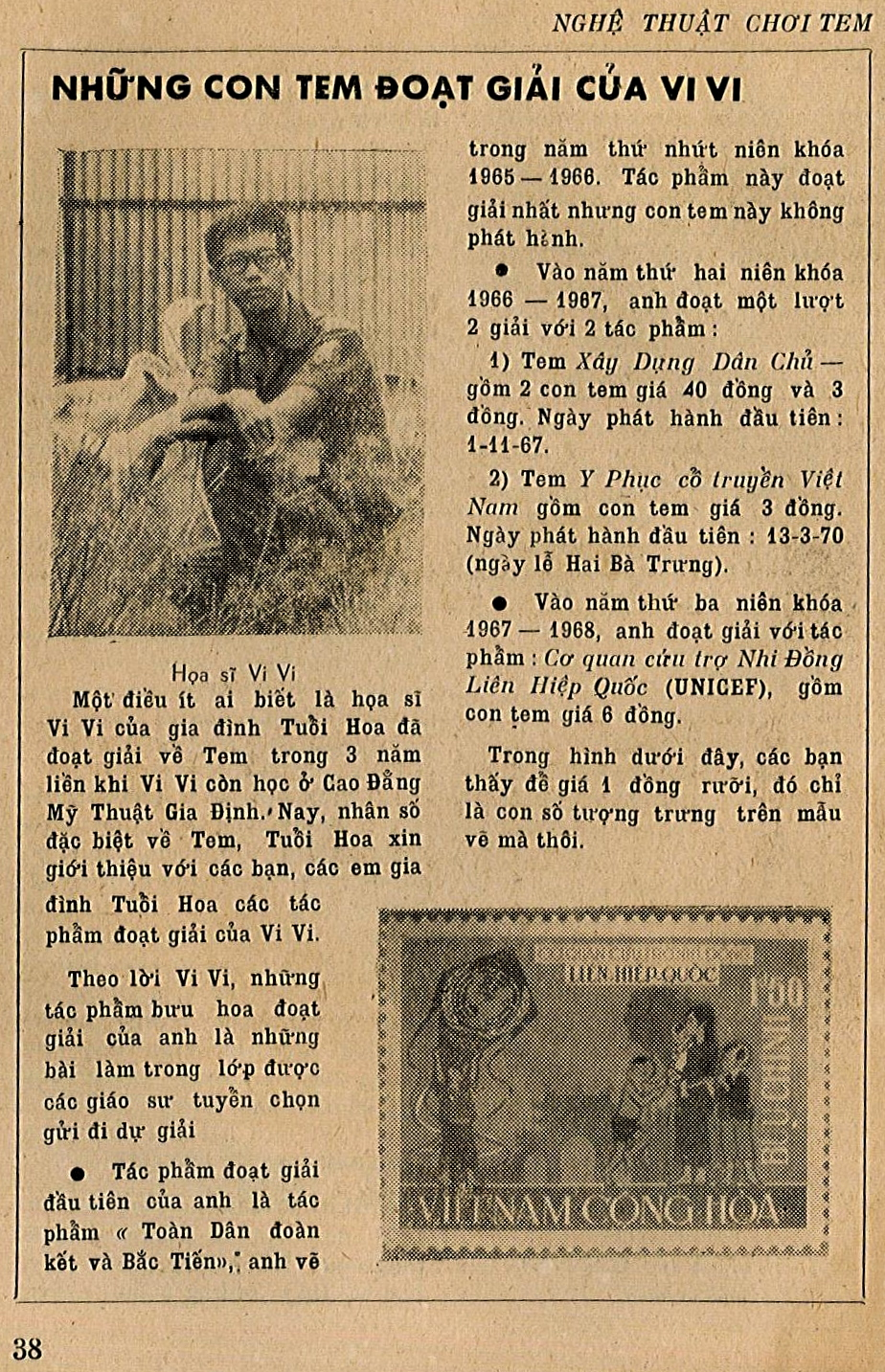
Article about ViVi and his career in Floral Age Bimonthly

From the late 1960s until 1975 in Saigon, Viet comics were popular with the most famous illustrator and comic artist at the time being Võ Hùng Kiệt (pen name: ViVi). During the 1970s, besides Viet comics, there were the Chinese Lianhuanhua, the Franco-Belgian Bande Dessinée, and the American comic book, though they were usually poorly printed pirated copies.

Example of a modern Viet comic's artstyle: "Hanoi, my city"

Since 1987, Viet comics developed and became similar to American comics with an increasing number of artists and genres. The government even attached special importance in encouraging the creation of comics. The most famous artist was Nguyễn Hùng Lân, whose most popular truyện tranh was the Hero Hesman. The content of these publications was broadly educational and offered lessons in moral philosophy for the reader.

From 1992, Japanese manga, such as Doraemon, Sailor Moon, and Dragon Ball, dominated Vietnam’s comic market. It was not until 2002, when Thần đồng Đất Việt was published, that a truyện tranh managed to gain popularity. However, according to Ðặng Cao Cường, head of Comic Editorial Department of Kim Đồng Publishing House, Viet comics only account for 10% of all published comics. Most of the comics distributed are foreign, with 70% (in total) being Japanese mangas.

Besides that, modern truyện tranh are also heavily influenced by the style of Japanese manga, American comics, Chinese manhua, and Korean manhwa. This even led to a huge debate in the 2000s among Vietnamese comic enjoyers with two main sides: those who supported the usage of Japanese manga's style (Phái Manga), and those who preferred the Western comic (Note: American and European comics)'s style (Phái Comic). In the end, due to a series of failure for Western-style Viet comics, and the fact that even world-famous Comics from the West had quite dismal sales in Vietnam, the debates gradually subsided and manga style has been since the main expression used. In additionally, Vietnamese comic authors are also trying to develop their own style and shape an identity that differentiates Vietnamese truyện tranh from foreign comics.

However, Viet comics still have many challenges to face, from the opposition of the older generation who often criticize the contents as harmful to children, to the cost and lack of support for comic creators, and finally the government of Vietnam who would occasionally ban comics due to them not being "cultural appropriation". In 2015, the Bureau of Publication, Printing and Distribution (Ministry of Information and Communications) issued the Official Dispatch 2116 (Công văn 2116/CXBIPH-QLXB (Note: abbreviation for: Cục Xuất bản, In và Phát hành - Quản lý Xuất bản (translated: Department of Publishing, Printing and Distribution - Publishing Management))) that banned the publication of comics with LGBT sexual contents. As readers of this genre switched to digital version, the authority called for the help from parents to discipline their children.

Recently, Danmei comics (comics about boys' love) are starting to reappear en masse. What more is that these works blatantly promote and show off the most taboo stories in Vietnamese culture and morality. [...] A type of "virus" that spreads quickly.

— Bảo Phương, Vietnam People's Public Security

== Digital Viet comics ==
Thanks to the Internet era, Viet comics have been able to reach larger audiences than ever thanks to comic reading platforms. Two most entrusted Vietnamese platforms are Comicola and POPS Comic:

Company name	Comic platform
Comicola	comi.mobi
POPS Worldwide	pops.vn

Khánh Dương, founder of Comicola and the creator of comi.mobi, the first Vietnamese comic reading app in Vietnam, stated that:

"They [the South Korean government] see manhwa as part of its strategy to enhance Korea's cultural power in the world. I think, if given proper attention and support, Vietnamese truyện tranh can absolutely have a larger voice in the region"

=== Pirating issue ===
Copyright violation is a large issue in Vietnam when works of many authors, both Vietnamese and foreigners, were stolen and either being printed illegally or being uploaded to pirated websites. It was estimated that Vietnam ranked third in Southeast Asia in terms of copyright infringement rate. TV shows, movies, music and books were the most to be violated, though it was recently discovered that many pirated websites had turned to pirating comics, causing a strong response from the creators.

== Famous Vietnamese comics ==
=== Non-fictional pictorial books ===
Academic publishings with visual illustrations. The topics are history and philosophy.

==== Mechanics and Crafts of the People of Annam ====
Mechanics and Crafts of the People of Annam, written by Henri Joseph Oger and illustrated by Vietnamese artists, was manuscript shows and illustrates the culture and living conditions of the Vietnamese people in Tonkin.

==== Luân Lý - Giáo Khoa Thư ====
Luân Lý - Giáo Khoa Thư, written by Trần Trọng Kim, presented issues of moral and ethical education for young people. Although many of the books' content was no longer suitable with current educational perspectives, a lot of its lessons was "still very rich in humanistic values, preserving and inheriting the traditional ethics of the nation."

=== Satirical illustrations ===
Comic strips and political cartoons in newspapers with the same characters being used multiple times.

==== Xã Xệ and Lý Toét ====
Xã Xệ and Lý Toét were fictional satirical duo which became popular in sketches through the columns of the Vietnamese newspapers in Tonkin from the 1930s to the 1940s, written by Nhất Linh and Nguyễn Gia Trí and published by Tự-Lực văn-đoàn. They represented the conflict between tradition and modernity.

==== Linda Kiều ====
Linda Kiều was a caricature character that appeared in comic strip of Tuổi Trẻ Cười (Note: Examples of Linda Kiều comic in Tuổi Trẻ Cười newspaper:123) (a supplement of Tuổi Trẻ daily newspaper), written by Nguyễn Hữu Tài and Lê Văn Nghĩa. The character was depicted with flirtatious, demanding, and flamboyant gestures.

=== Children's comics ===
Comic books for children with educational contents and moral lessons. They are suitable for all ages.

==== Dế Mèn phiêu lưu ký ====
Dế Mèn phiêu lưu ký, known in English as the Diary of a cricket, was a popular novel written by Tô Hoài. It was the most reprinted work in the history of Kim Dong Publishing House, with the text-only edition had already been reprinted for the 87th time while the illustrated comic versions by Trương Qua and Tạ Huy Long was in its 18th and 17th edition.

==== Bi, Bo và Kim Quy ====
Bi, Bo và Kim Quy (literally means "Bi, Bo, and Kim Quy") was a comic written by Quang Toàn. The story revolved around the adventures of two sisters named Bi and Bo, along with Kim Quy, a golden turtle possessing many magical powers.

==== Mai Mơ và Chi Li ====
Mai Mơ và Chi Li was a comic written by Phan Thị Giao Chi and illustrated by Hướng Dương. The story revolved around the lives of twin sisters Mai Mơ and Chi Li, along with their close friends, at the Úm Ba La magic school.

==== Tý Quậy ====
Tý Quậy (literally means "Naughty Tý") was a comic series written by Đào Hải and published by Kim Dong, considered one of the most famous domestic comic series in Vietnam. The comic was about Tý and Tèo who are troublemakers but full of compassion.

==== Trạng Quỷnh ====
Trạng Quỳnh – Trạng Quỷnh was a comic about a zhuangyuan (trạng) named Quỳnh (based on Trạng Quỳnh, a historical figure) and his son Quỷnh (a fictional character). Written by Kim Khánh, the comic was first named "Trạng Quỳnh" before changing into "Trạng Quỷnh" as the main character died and was changed. The comic was described as witty and surprising, known for offering educational contents while criticizing negative phenomena of society.

==== Dũng sĩ Hesman ====
Dũng sĩ Hesman, known in English as Hero Hesman, was a Voltron-inspired comic written by Nguyễn Hùng Lân in the 1990s (though Hùng Lân only credited himself as an "adaptation artist"). The comic was set in the year 2250, when humans had managed to build an interstellar empire. It was the best-selling Vietnamese series for ten consecutive years until the record was broken by Thần đồng Đất Việt.

The comic was run for four years, with 159 volumes, when Hùng Lân was forced to switch to another project. Up until 2019, with the support from young Vietnamese comic creators, he wrote the 160th volume (also the last volume) as a gift to his former readers.

==== Thần đồng Đất Việt ====
Thần đồng Đất Việt, known in English as Vietnamese child prodigies, was written by Lê Linh (though Linh later withdrew from the project, new volumes were still published, causing a 12-year longed lawsuit). With plot set in the Later Lê dynasty, Thần đồng Đất Việt introduced Vietnamese history and culture while stayed entertaining. It was the first Vietnamese comic that gained widespread popularity among children since the introduction of Japanese manga, and was the longest-running comic series in Vietnam.

In 2013, an adapted series was published, naming "Thần đồng đất Việt: Hoàng Sa – Trường Sa" (Vietnamese Child Prodigies: Paracels – Spratly), which served as "a new communication strategy to convey messages of patriotism and knowledge about the country’s sea and island sovereignty to the young generations.” The book received support from local readers and the Navy High Command (Bộ Tư lệnh Hải quân), but was opposed by Chinese press.

=== Teenagers and adults’ comics ===
Comics that mostly target teenagers and adults consists of styles that are influenced by Japanese manga, Korean manhwa, and Chinese manhua. Many Vietnamese people often find it strange for comics to have age ratings since comics are traditionally viewed as for children.

"Dragon Land" (Đất Rồng), the first Viet comic to win an award at Japan’s International Manga Award

==== Đất Rồng ====
“Đất Rồng”, known in English as the “Dragon Land”, was a Vietnamese manga-influenced comic and a joint project of various authors from the Dimensional Art (3D Hanoi) Group. Its plot, inspired by the Vietnamese legend of Sơn Tinh – Thủy Tinh, was about the adventurous story of three young people on their journey to awaken the energy of Goodness. The comic earned a Bronze Award at Japan’s Sixth International Manga Award.

==== Long Thần Tướng ====
“Long Thần Tướng”, known in English as the “Holy Dragon Imperator”, was written by Nguyễn Thành Phong and Nguyễn Khánh Dương. The plot was about a modern-day girl who suddenly lost consciousness and recalled the memory of a village-head’s daughter during the Trần dynasty. The comic earned a Silver Award at Japan’s Ninth International Manga Award, becoming one of Vietnam’s most successful crowd-funding projects. Khánh Dương is also the founder of Comicola and its comic website.

==== Địa Ngục Môn ====
“Địa Ngục Môn”, known in English as the “Gateway to Underworld”, was written by Can Tiểu Hy (Phan Cao Hà My). It told a story of a girl who fell into hell and her journey of getting back to the human realm. The comic earned a Silver Award at Japan’s Tenth International Manga Awards.

==== Bẩm thầy Tường, có thầy Vũ đến tìm! ====
“Bẩm thầy Tường, có thầy Vũ đến tìm!”, known in English as “Rain In A Moon Night”, was written by Hoàng Tường Vy. The story revolved around the love story of the herbalist Tường and the teacher Vũ, and their lives in feudal Vietnam. The comic earned a Bronze Award at Japan’s Sixteenth International Manga Awards.

==== Điệu nhảy của vũ trụ ====
“Điệu nhảy của vũ trụ”, known in English as “The Dancing Universe”, was written by Nachi Nguyen. Its plot surrounded the daily life of celestial bodies, such as the Sun, the Earth, the Moon, Venus, Saturn, and Jupiter, and their coordinated efforts to protect life on Earth. The comic earned a Silver Award at Japan’s Seventeenth International Manga Awards.

==== Danh tác Việt Nam ====
Cover of "Tắt Đèn" comic by B.R.O. group, adapted from Ngô Tất Tố's novel

“Danh tác Việt Nam” (literally means “Vietnamese masterpieces”) was a series of comics that took its plot from famous Vietnamese literary works, but were illustrated in manga style by the B.R.O group. The series was published by Phan Thị Company.

[...] our country has many good literary works, it would be a waste if they were to be lost over time! Hopefully this will be a bridge between young people and literature.

— Phan Thị Mỹ Hạnh, Director of Phan Thị Company

- Giông Tố (The Storm, 6 volumes) was adapted from Vũ Trọng Phụng's novel of the same name.
- Tắt Đèn (Lights Out, 2 volumes) was adapted from Ngô Tất Tố's novel of the same name.
- Chí Phèo (1 volume) was adapted from Nam Cao's short story of the same name.
- Chiếc lược ngà (The ivory comb, 1 volume) was adapted from Nguyễn Quang Sáng's short story of the same name.

==== Mùa Hè Bất Tận ====
“Mùa Hè Bất Tận”, known in English as the “Eternal Summer”, was written by Lâm Hoàng Trúc. Influence by manga style, the comic revolved around two students and their thoughts of the world. This coming-of-age comic quickly drew popularity in 2021 as twenty-six hundred copies were preordered before public release.

==== Lớp Học Mật Ngữ ====
“Lớp Học Mật Ngữ” (literally means “Class of the Secret Language”) was a joint project of various authors from the B.R.O group. Originally published on the students’ newspapers “Thiên Thần Nhỏ,” the comic became the bestseller in 2018 and 2019. The B.R.O was also the author of “Học sinh chân kinh” (means “The true students”), a comic that became famous in 2015.

== Other Viet comics ==
=== Comics from school textbooks ===
Textbooks in Vietnam (Vietnamese: Sách giáo khoa) often have comics to convey lessons to students.

"Chuyện bốn mùa" on page 4 and 6 in Vietnamese-learning Textbook for Second Grade, volume 2 (Nguyễn Minh Thuyết's 2003 version)

- Chuyện bốn mùa (The Story of Four Seasons) told the story of fours fairies who represents the seasons. It suddenly gained mass attention in early 2024 due to the disappointment with the reformed textbook’s illustration, which was considered to be inferior to the 2003 version. Many artists would then draw their own versions of the four fairies, which created a trend on the internet.

=== Serialized titles on POPS Comics ===
POPS Comics is a Vietnamese user-generated content webcomic platform launched by POPS Worldwide Entertainment in 2020, hosting both Chinese, Korean, and Vietnamese full comics and one-shots. Below is a list of POPS' Viet comics:

- 28
- 50 Shades of Colors
- 52Hz
- Anti Main Lead Club
- Bad Luck
- Bình An Nghỉ Academy
- Blue Magic
- Cánh Hoa Trôi Giữa Thời @
- Dearly Moments in My Junior High School
- Diary of My Foods
- Diary of a Boy-sitter Sister
- Đọa Ký
- Eternal Fixation
- Hydrangea
- Isekai Coup d'état Plot of Diphylleia in the Land of Emboriel
- Kế Hoạch Sống Còn Của Team Thầy Ba
- Lạc trôi
- Lemon First Love
- Mangaka, I Wanna Leave!
- My Boss is a Bastard!
- My Brother is a T-rex
- Mys City
- Notre nuit étoilée
- Perfect Enemy
- Phản diện tới đây
- Pieces of Wonder
- Record of Demonic Union
- Roommate
- Slice of Life: Office worker
- Tender Break
- The Scholar Queen
- The Weirdos
- The Daily Life of the S Family
- Thiều Quang Vừa Lúc
- TWINS: Red
- Want to Put You in the Cart!
- Web Browser Stories
- Wingsfaito Anthology Comics
- Yêu Thêm Lần Nữa

== Promotion events ==
On the 6th of September, 2015, Vietnamese comic artists from all three regions of Vietnam organized a Comics Day in Hanoi. The event was sponsored by Comicola comic company so that people could approach to new Viet comics. It also served as a tool to fight back an old perception that comics are just for kids and have to be dogmatic.

The second Vietnam Comics Day was held on the 11th of September, 2016, and was meant to introduce the achievements of Viet comics to readers. On February 24, 2019, the third Comics Day was launched in Ho Chi Minh City with a special visit from Nguyễn Hùng Lân, author of the once-famous Hero Hesman. It was here that Hùng Lân talked about his plan for the 160th volume.

For two days in 2020, from November 28 to 29, Comicola and Acecook Việt Nam organized the “Vietnam - Japan Comic Fes” (VJCF) in Ho Chi Minh City. The festival had a cosplay contest, a Japanese food fair, and a plethora of Vietnamese and Japanese manga. It was the biggest comics and pop culture event in Vietnam at the time. The second VJCF was held in 2022 from August 27 to 28.

The Vietnam - Japan Comic Fes 2023 was scheduled for three days from the 23rd to the 25th of June, marking the 50th anniversary of the establishment of diplomatic relations between Japan and Vietnam. And as one of the activities to celebrate the anniversary, a new manga was distributed free of charge during the event. Written by Higashimura Akiko, the manga, "Princess Anio" (Công nữ Anio), told a historical-based story of the love between Japanese merchant Araki Sotaro and Princess Ngoc Hoa.

In 2021 and 2022, POPS Worldwide digital entertainment company held the "POPS Comic Awards" as part of its Bonus Program. Launched in 2020, the program's purpose were to promote Vietnamese comic artists and help them build their brands and audience. The new POPS Comic Awards were meant to encourage artists to submit their work in exchange for potential cash prize.

At the end of July 2023, a comic event was launched with the name "Manga Comic Con Vietnam", organized in Ho Chi Minh City by VIETFEST, DTS GROUP, and FM STUD‌IO. There were cosplayers and displays of crafted products and "terrible" models. The event also had the presence of Noboru Kaneko, a famous Japanese actor who played the role of Gao Red in Hyakujuu Sentai Gaoranger.

Since 2018, an anime convention named Color Fiesta has been organized annually in Ho Chi Minh City with cosplays, artist booths, and Vtuber meetups. Not only serves as an exchange channel to connect artists and the community of comic lovers, this event is also the opportunity for young comic creators to prove to their families that drawing, especially drawing manga and anime, can still generate income. Color Fiesta was claimed to be "Vietnam’s largest Artist Convention."

== See also ==
- Literature of Vietnam
- Vietnamese animation
- Manga
- Manhua
- Manhwa
- Visual novel
