= Kim Đồng Publishing House =

Vietnamese publishing company

Kim Đồng Publishing House 家出版金童
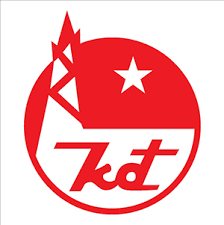
- Status: Active
- Founded: June 17, 1957; 69 years ago
- Country of origin: Vietnam
- Headquarters location: Hanoi, Vietnam
- Owner: Ho Chi Minh Communist Youth Union
- Official website: nxbkimdong.com.vn

Kim Đồng Publishing House (Vietnamese: Nhà xuất bản Kim Đồng) is the largest printing and publishing company in Vietnam mainly focused on education and comic-related books and magazines for children, teenager boys and adolescent girls. With more than a thousand titles of books published yearly, its books are offered to children of all ages, providing a wide range of collections and genres from literature, science, art, history to comics, pop-up and board books. The publishing company was named after a Kim Đồng, a young Viet Minh fighter who died in 1943.

== Overview ==
Besides working with local authors and artists, Kim Dong publishing house has been expanding their co-operation with more than 70 foreign publishers to find new topics and book types. Amongst those publishers, they have been working closely with Dorling Kindersley, HarperCollins UK, Simon and Schuster UK, Dami International, Shogakukan Inc., Seoul Publishing House, etc.

Together with publishing and producing, Nhà xuất bản Kim Đồng is also the holder of many movements of books, comics, songs, poems, creation for the children. The publisher also takes part in many social events, such as the Doraemon Scholarship Fund, supporting maintain of Bà mẹ Việt Nam anh hùng (literally meaning Heroic Vietnamese Mother), building book collections for the poor Vietnamese communes, building schools for the people in mountainous regions, etc.

Currently, the Publisher's head office was located at the address: number 55, Quang Trung street, Hanoi. Its two branches are located at number 169, Trần Phú street, Đà Nẵng and at number 268, Nguyễn Đình Chiểu street, Ho Chi Minh City.

The publishing house was founded on 17 June 1957. Its General Director is Mr Pham Quang Vinh. There are around a hundred staff, a thousand titles per annum, and 12,000,000 copies of books every month. Genres include literature, art, science, comics, etc.

== Creation of Kim Đồng Publishing House ==
Right after its establishment, the government of North Vietnam paid attention to the education of children, and considered arts and literature as the most important parts in the new generation's education.

In the years 1945–1946, children's books were published at Hanoi by Hội Văn hóa Cứu quốc (National Salvating Culture Association) and Nhà xuất bản Cứu quốc (National Salvation Publishing house). After the outbreak of the First Indochina War, in 1948 the books were published at Việt Bắc war zone by the partnership of Tủ sách Kim Đồng (Kim Đồng Bookshelf) and "Hoa kháng chiến" Publisher. The war ended in 1954, and Tủ sách Kim Đồng continued to publish books as a part of Nhà xuất bản Thanh niên (Youth Publishing House).

Then, at the Second Letters and Arts Congress (February 1957), creating books for children was stated as a very important mission for Vietnam, hence in this congress people started to prepare for an establishment of a new publisher particularly serve the Vietnamese children and junior citizens.

Not very long after that, on March 16, 1957, a meeting about establishing a publisher for children was held at the head office of Hội Văn nghệ Việt Nam (Vietnam's Letters and Arts Association), with the participation of 12 people who then became the founders of the new publisher.

The new publisher was officially founded on June 17, 1957, with the name Nhà xuất bản Kim Đồng (Kim Đồng Publishing House). The name "Kim Đồng" was proposed by the writer Tô Hoài, as Kim Đồng is also the name of a famous teenage revolutionary martyr. The new publisher was considered as the successor of the former Kim Đồng Bookshelf. The first General Director was the well-known writer and drama-writer Nguyễn Huy Tưởng. The foundation of the publisher was announced in the daily newspapers on the next day.

The first head office of the publisher was at the number 55, Quang Trung street, Hai Bà Trưng District, Hanoi.

== Some notable works published by Kim Đồng Publishing House ==
=== Modern Vietnamese literature ===
- Dế mèn phiêu lưu ký (The Adventures of a Cricket), a well-known fiction of Tô Hoài.
- Đất rừng phương Nam (The Southern forest land).
- Lá cờ thêu sáu chữ vàng (The flag embroidered with the six golden words), a novel by Nguyễn Huy Tưởng.
- Góc sân và khoảng trời (The yard corner and the sky interval), a poem-collection created by the well-known Vietnamese poet Trần Đăng Khoa
- Kính Vạn Hoa (The Kaleidoscope), a well-known fiction of Nguyễn Nhật Ánh.

=== Foreign comics ===
Kim Đồng Publishing House is one of the largest manga publishers in Vietnam

Vietnamese Name	Original name	Demographic	Author	Original Publisher	Country	Published Year	Status	Note
Đô-rê-mon	Doraemon	Young children	Fujiko F. Fujio	Shogakukan	Japan		Finished	It was illegally published in 1993–1994 from a Thai translation. However, the next edition was published legally with the permission of Shogakukan. Of course, the Kim Đồng Publishing House had to pay the copyright money for the first illegal publishing and then both the publishers used that money to create the Doraemon Scholarship Fund.
Perman - Cậu bé siêu nhân	Perman	Young children	Fujiko F. Fujio	Shogakukan	Japan	2017	Finished	
Chie Cô bé hạt tiêu	Jarinko Chie	Seinen	Etsumi Haruki	Futabasha	Japan	2014	Finished	
Ninja Rantaro	Rakudai Ninja Rantarō	Seinen	Amako Sōbē	Asahi Gakusei Shimbun	Japan	2008	Finished	
Itto - cơn lốc sân cỏ	Kattobi Itto	Shōnen	Motoki Monma	Shūeisha	Japan	2009	Finished	
Bảy viên ngọc rồng	Dragon Ball	Shōnen	Toriyama Akira	Shūeisha	Japan	2008	Finished	
Dr. Slump	Dr. Slump	Shōnen	Toriyama Akira	Shūeisha	Japan	2012	Finished	
Thám tử lừng danh Conan	Detective Conan	Shōnen	Aoyama Gosho	Shogakukan	Japan	2008	Ongoing	
Hunter x Hunter	Hunter x Hunter	Shōnen	Yoshihiro Togashi	Shūeisha	Japan	2017	Ongoing	
Hành trình U Linh Giới	Yu Yu Hakusho	Shōnen	Yoshihiro Togashi	Shūeisha	Japan	2016	Finished	
One Piece	One Piece	Shōnen	Eiichiro Oda	Shūeisha	Japan	2008	Ongoing	
One-Punch Man	One Punch Man	Shōnen	Yusuke Murata	Shūeisha	Japan	2017	Ongoing	
Gia sư Hitman Reborn	Katekyo Hitman Reborn	Shōnen	Amano Akira	Shūeisha	Japan	2007	Finished	
Eyeshield 21	Eyeshield 21	Shōnen	Riichiro Inagaki	Shūeisha	Japan	2010	Finished	
Học viện siêu anh hùng	My Hero Academia	Shōnen	Kōhei Horikoshi	Shūeisha	Japan	2018	Ongoing	
Yu-Gi-Oh! - Vua Trò chơi	Yu-Gi-Oh!	Shōnen	Kazuki Takahashi	Shūeisha	Japan	2016	Finished	
Vua Pháp Sư	Shaman King	Shōnen	Hiroyuki Takei	Shūeisha	Japan	2016	Finished	
Gintama	Gintama	Shōnen	Sorachi Hideaki	Shūeisha	Japan	2014	Ongoing	
Hikaru - Kì thủ cờ vây	Hikaru no Go	Shōnen	Obata Takeshi, Yumi Hotta	Shūeisha	Japan	2015	Finished	
Bakuman	Bakuman	Shōnen	Obata Takeshi, Ōba Tsugumi	Shūeisha	Japan	2009	Finished	
Basara	Basara	Shōjo	Tamura Yumi	Shogakukan	Japan	2014	Finished	
7 mầm sống	7 Seeds	Josei	Tamura Yumi	Shogakukan	Japan	2007	Finished	
Toraji Phiêu Lưu Kí	Neko Mix Genkitan Toraji	Shōjo	Tamura Yumi	Shogakukan	Japan	2016	Finished	
Thủy thủ Mặt Trăng	Sailor Moon	Shōjo	Takeuchi Naoko	Kodansha	Japan	2017	Finished	
Honey và Clover	Honey and Clover	Seinen	Umino Chika	Shūeisha	Japan	2015	Finished	
Sư tử tháng 3	Sangatsu no Lion	Seinen	Umino Chika	Hakusensha	Japan	2017	Ongoing	
Tiệm thú kiểng	Pet Shop of Horrors	Shōjo	Akino Matsuri	Ohzora	Japan	2015	Ongoing	
XXXHolic	XxxHolic	Seinen	CLAMP	Kodansha	Japan	2015	Finished	
Tsubasa -RESERVoir CHRoNiCLE-	Tsubasa -RESERVoir CHRoNiCLE-	Shōnen	CLAMP	Kodansha	Japan	2015	Finished	
Thủ lĩnh thẻ bài Sakura	Cardcaptor Sakura	Shōjo	CLAMP	Kodansha	Japan	2015	Finished	
Haikyu!! - Chàng khổng lồ tí hon	Haikyu!!	Shōnen	Furudate Haruichi	Shūeisha	Japan	2016	Finished	
Shin-cậu bé bút chì	Crayon Shin-chan	Young children	Yoshito Usui	Futabasha	Japan		Finished	
Asari - Cô bé tinh nghịch	Asari-chan	Young children	Mayumi Muroyama	Shogakukan	Japan	2014	Finished	
Sket Dance	Sket Dance	Shōnen	Kenta Shinohara	Shūeisha	Japan	2016	Finished	
Magi - Mê cung thần thoại	Magi: The Labyrinth of Magic	Shōnen	Shinobu Ohtaka	Shogakukan	Japan	2016	Finished	
Pandora Hearts	Pandora Hearts	Shōnen	Jun Mochizuki	Square Enix	Japan	2014	Finished	
Hồi kí Vanitas	The Case Study of Vanitas	Shōnen	Jun Mochizuki	Square Enix	Japan	2017	Ongoing	
Hậu duệ của Nurarihyon	Nurahiyon's Grandson	Shōnen	Shībashi Hiroshi	Shūeisha	Japan	2013	Finished	
Thiên Thần Diệt Thế	Owari no Seraph	Shōnen	Takaya Kagami	Shūeisha	Japan	2018	Ongoing	
Cuộc sống hoang dã	Wild Life	Shōnen	Fujisaki Masato	Shogakukan	Japan	2008	Finished	
Orange Chocolate	Orange Chocolate	Shōjo	Nanpei Yamada	Hakusensha	Japan	2016	Finished	
Bách quỷ dạ hành ký	Hyakki Yakoushou	Seinen	Ichiko Ima	Sonorama	Japan	2017	Ongoing	
Tiếng gọi từ vì sao xa	Hoshi no Koe	Seinen	Sahara Mizu	Kodansha	Japan	2018	Finished	
Con gái của ba	My Girl	Seinen	Sahara Mizu	Shinchosha	Japan	2018	Finished	
Bác sĩ ma giới	Youkai no Oisha-san	Shōnen	Yuki Sato	Kodansha	Japan	2018	Ongoing	
Câu chuyện tình tôi	Ore Monogatari!!	Shōjo	Kawahara Kazune	Shūeisha	Japan	2018	Ongoing	
Trò chơi cút bắt	Omoi, Omoware, Furi, Furare	Shōjo	Io Sakisaka	Shūeisha	Japan	2018	Ongoing	
Tôi là Sakamoto	Sakamoto desu ga	Shōjo	Sano Nami	Enterbrain	Japan	2018	Finished	
Đầu gấu và bốn mắt	Yanki-kun to Megane-chan	Shōjo	Miki Yoshikawa	Kodansha	Japan	2018	Ongoing	
Quái vật bàn bên	Tonari no Kaibutsu-kun	Shōjo	Robico	Kodansha	Japan	2017	Finished	
Chú Thoòng	Old Master Q	Manhua	Alfonso Wong	WangZ Inc.	Hong Kong	2017	Finished	
Ô Long Viện	Wuloom Family	Manhua	Yan Youxiang	China Times	Taiwan	2010	Finished	
Thư sinh bóng đêm	The Scholar Who Walks the Night	Manhwa	Jo Joo-hee, Han Seung-hee	Seoul Cultural Publishers	Korea	2016	Ongoing	
Trường Ca Hành	Song of the long march	Manhua	Xia Da	China Times Publishing Co. Shūeisha	China	2016	Ongoing	
Kimi Ni Todoke - Nguyện ước yêu thương	Kimi ni Todoke	Shōjo	Shiina Karuho	Shūeisha	Japan	2015	Finished	
Hội chứng tuổi thanh xuân	Rascal Does Not Dream	Seinen	Kamoshida Hajime	ASCII Media Works	Japan	2019	Finished	
Komi - Nữ thần sợ giao tiếp	Komi Can't Communicate	Shōnen	Oda Tomohito	Shogakukan	Japan	2021	Ongoing	
Chú thuật hồi chiến	Jujutsu Kaisen	Shōnen	Gege Akutami	Shūeisha	Japan	2021	Ongoing	
Alya bàn bên thỉnh thoảng lại trêu ghẹo tôi bằng tiếng Nga	Alya Sometimes Hides Her Feelings in Russian	Shōnen	Sunsunsun & Momoco	Kadokawa Shoten	Japan	2022	Ongoing	
Bocchi the Rock!	Bocchi the Rock!	Seinen	Hamaji Aki	Houbunsha	Japan	2023	Ongoing	
Frieren – Pháp sư tiễn táng	Frieren	Shōnen	Yamada Kanehito & Abe Tsukasa	Shogakukan	Japan	2024	Ongoing	
Chung một mái nhà	Gimai Seikatsu	Shōnen	Ghost Mikawa & Hiten	Kadokawa Shoten	Japan	2024	Ongoing	
Khi "trai" đẹp hẹn hò	How I Attended an All-Guy's Mixer	Shōjo	Nana Aokawa	Square Enix	Japan	2024	Ongoing	
Cô nàng Shimotsuki trót phải lòng nhân vật nền	Shimotsuki-san Likes the Mob	Shōnen	Kagami Yagami & Roha	Micro Magazine-sha	Japan	2024	Ongoing	

=== Other ===
- TKKG, was published in 1994–1996 with the name "Tứ quái TKKG" (The four strange people, TKKG)
- Little House on the Prairie, published in 2019.
