= Kim Dong =

Kim Dong may refer to:

- Kim Đồng (1929–1943), Nùng boy who fought for Vietnamese independence against the French
- Kim Đồng Publishing House, Vietnamese publisher named after the boy
- Kim Động, rural district of Hưng Yên province, Vietnam

== See also ==
- Dong Kim, neurosurgeon at The University of Texas Health Science Center, Houston
- Jintong (mythology), servant of the Jade Emperor, known as Kim Đồng in Vietnam
