= Adventures of a Cricket =

1941 children novel by Tô Hoài

Dế Mèn phiêu lưu ký
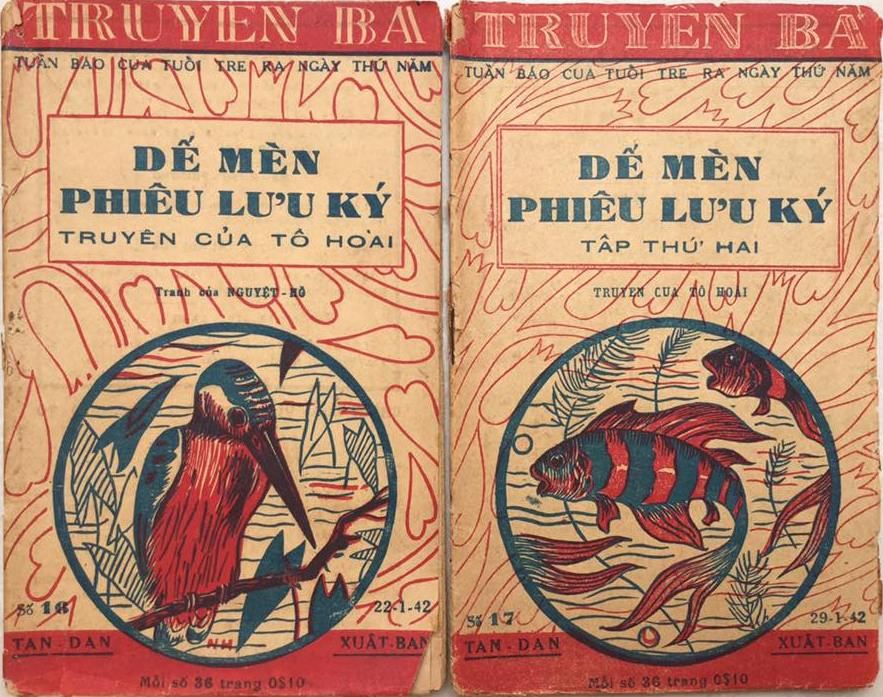
- Author: Tô Hoài
- Language: Vietnamese
- Genre: Children's novel
- Publisher: Original edition: Tân Dân Publishing House; Modern edition: Kim Dong Publishing House
- Publication date: 1941
- Publication place: Vietnam

Adventures of a Cricket (Vietnamese: Dế Mèn phiêu lưu ký) is a Vietnamese children novel written by Tô Hoài. The novel is about a cricket named Mèn (Note: "Dế mèn" is a generic word that literally means 'true' cricket in Vietnamese, but the novel refers to the protagonist as only "Mèn" because "dế" can refer to crickets in general) and his adventure in a human village and the animal kingdom. The cricket protagonist was originally featured in a 1941 short story by Hoài's Con Dế Mèn ("The Cricket") to the Tân Dân Publishing House, which corresponds to the first three chapters of the modern edition. Around that year, he then wrote second story eponymously titled Dế Mèn phiêu lưu ký (Adventures of a Cricket), which corresponds to the last seven chapters, and later editions of the novel merged it with Con Dế Mèn.

== Plot ==
Dế Mèn, a cricket, born alongside two siblings, is separated from them after only two days according to the cricket family's tradition, and he relishes the independence it brings. Mèn, mischievous and playful, inadvertently causes the tragic death of Dế Choắt (Mèn's neighbor, another cricket) by teasing Cốc (cormorant).

As Dế Mèn remorsefully contemplates his actions, he is unexpectedly caught by two human children and lost independence. He is forced to fight against other insects for the children's amusement and was malnourished. A harsh lesson from Xiến Tóc (longhorn beetle) involving cutting of Dế Mèn's antennae, led to Mèn's transformative awakening and growth in maturity. One day, while Mèn was trapped in a matchbox and the children's are playing soccer, Mèn seizes an opportunity to break free. Freed from captivity, on the way Mèn goes back home, he rescued Nhà Trò (moth) from a group of spiders that bullied her due to her family's debt.

Mèn meets his mother and relatives again after the first adventure. While on the way visiting his older siblings, Mèn seeks a companion for a new adventure and encounters Dế Trũi (mole cricket), whom he had previously saved from peril.

They become sworn brothers and "set sail" on a leaf, only to encounter treacherous waters and almost died from hunger and exhaustion before reaching the "coastline". On land, Mèn and Trũi are welcomed by the inhabitants of Xóm Lầy Lội (swampy animal village), however, soon they leave due to the boastful and distasteful Cóc (toad) and Ếch Cốm (frog). They then travel to Cỏ May (grassy area), a region known for its martial spirit, where they win the fight against Bọ Ngựa và Bọ Muỗm (leader of the mantis and bush cricket clans respectively). Mèn and Trũi become leaders of the respective clans. Due to a territorial dispute with the more dominant grasshopper clan in the winter, Trũi is jailed by the clan leader Châu Chấu Voi ('elephant' grasshopper).

Mèn then leaves and embarks on an independent journey. Many seasons later, though, Mèn still do not find Trũi. He meets Xiến Tóc again, who has cut his antenna, now bored with life and plays with butterfly and cicada prostitutes. Xiến Tóc tells Mèn that Châu Chấu Voi is a person of good nature and Trũi is still in good health. Shortly after Mèn leaves, he is caught by Chim Trả (kingfisher) and forced to become a servant. Trũi and the Châu Chấu Voi clan then rescued Mèn. Mèn realized that the purpose of an insect's life is to collaborate on shared goals and coexist peacefully with the animal kingdom. He sent a message about that realization to the ants, which then spread the message to the entire animal kingdom.

After the second adventure, he returns to his home. Mèn's mother and older anaemic brother are now deceased. Mèn's other brother, who was very stern and denied Mèn's invitation to join his adventures, now became much more manly. In the last chapter, Mèn reflects on his life and is in preparation for his third adventure.

== Reception ==
As told by Hoài, the novel is influenced from his involvement with Vietnam's communist movement during his teenage years, and as such the cricket protagonist features a strong adventurous and driven personality.

The novel is very popular in Vietnam and is considered a classic of Vietnamese children books. In 2020, Kim Dong Publishing House's text-only edition of Adventures of a Cricket has been reprinted 87 times, the most out of all books by the publishing house. The novel has been translated to many languages. Theater adaptations of the novel have been performed in Ho Chi Minh City in 2018 and 2023.
