= Nguyễn Gia Trí =

Vietnamese painter

Nguyễn Gia Trí (Chương Mỹ, Hà Tây 1908 - 1993) was a Vietnamese painter best known for his lacquer paintings. He also drew cartoons on political and social issues, many of them criticising French colonial rule.

Tri studied at the Hanoi College of Fine Arts (École des Beaux-Arts de l’Indochine) from 1932. He worked for the magazines Phong Hóa and Ngày Nay starting from 1932 together with Nhất Linh and other famous writers and painters. He created the cartoon characters Xã Xệ and Bang Bạnh for the magazines and made changes to the character Lý Toét developed by Nhất Linh.

== Works ==
Many of his works are in the Vietnam National Museum of Fine Arts, Hanoi.

Playing in spring, sketch on paper

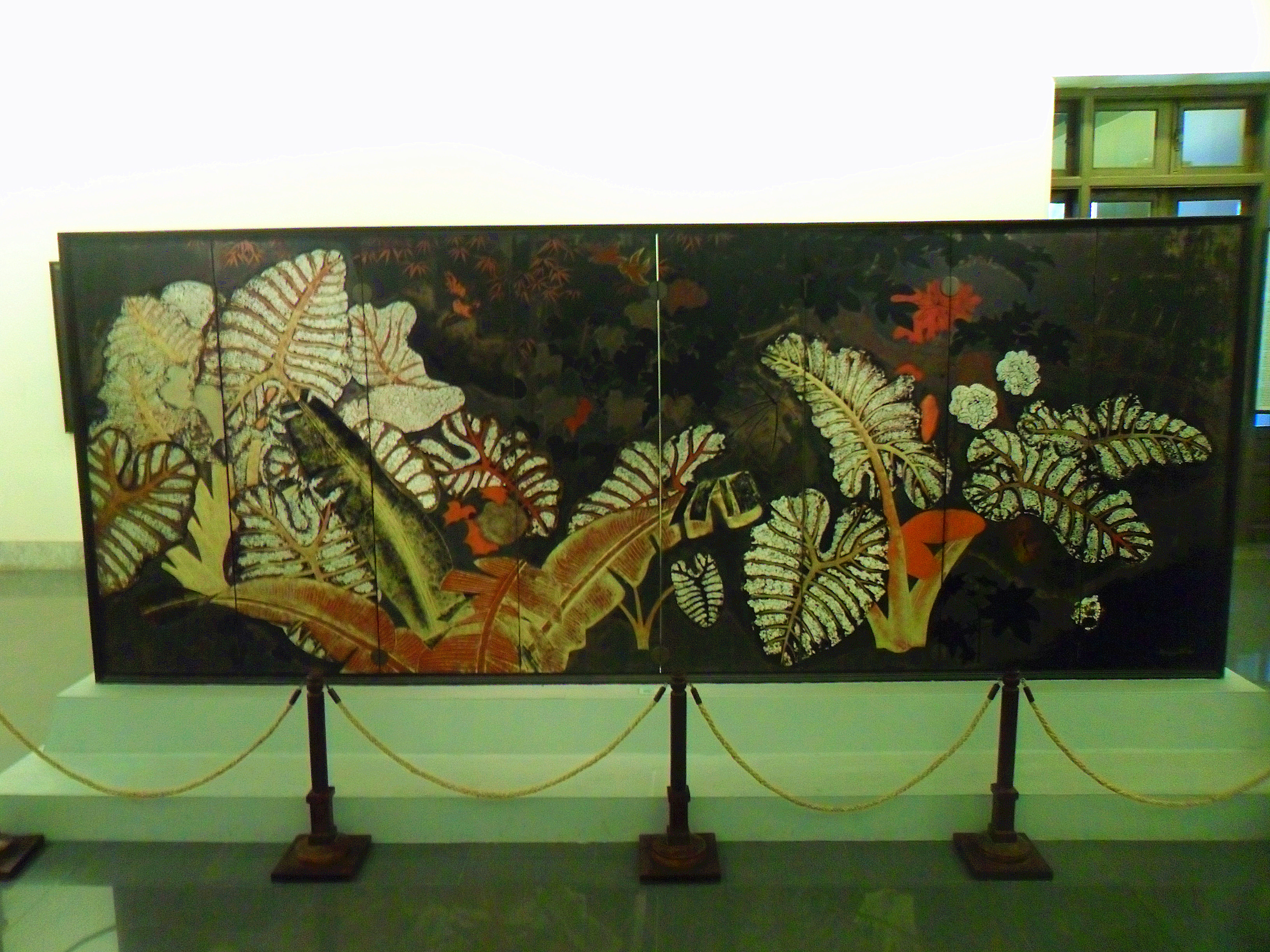
Wild taro

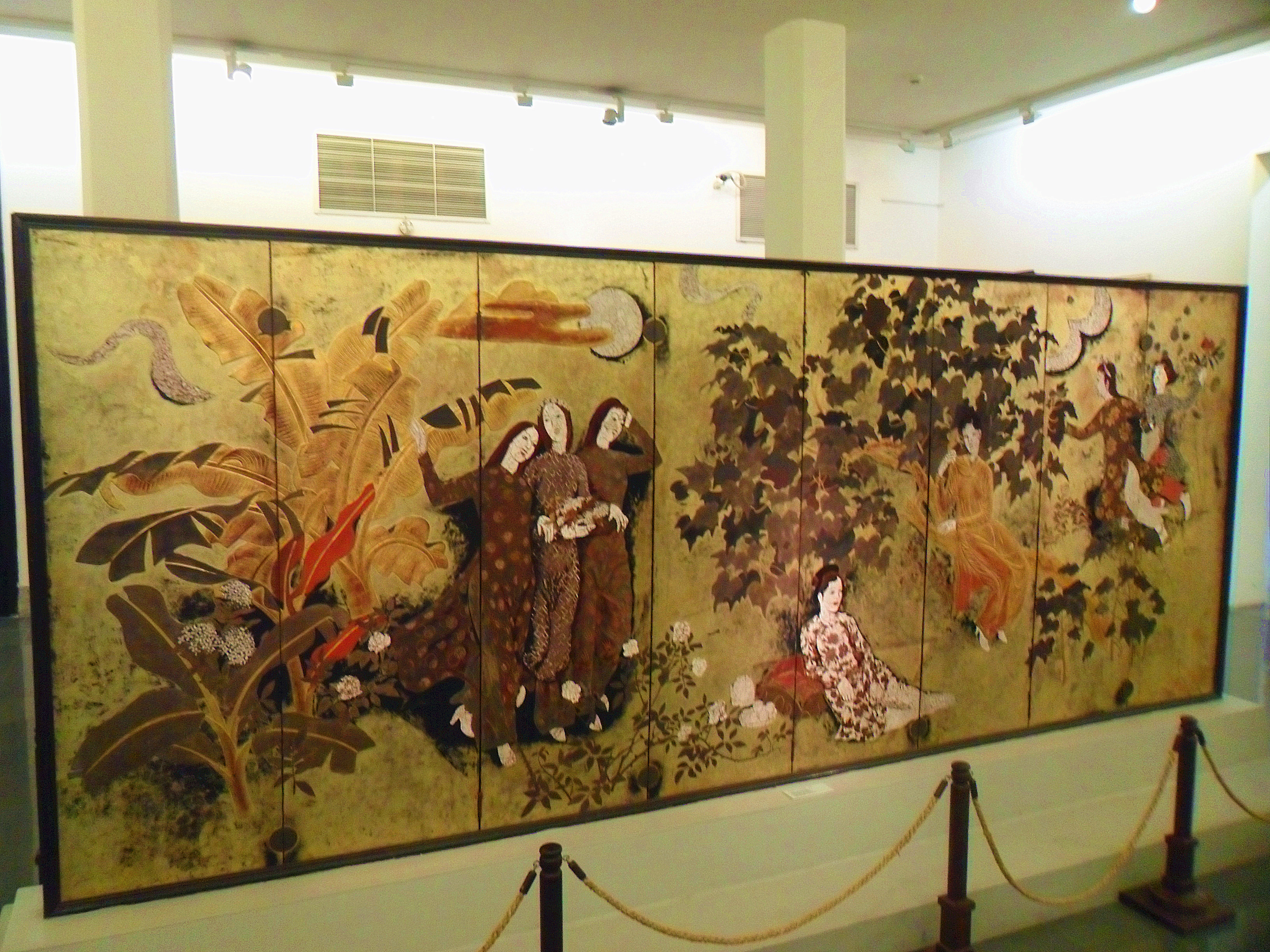
Maidens in the garden (back side of Wild taro)

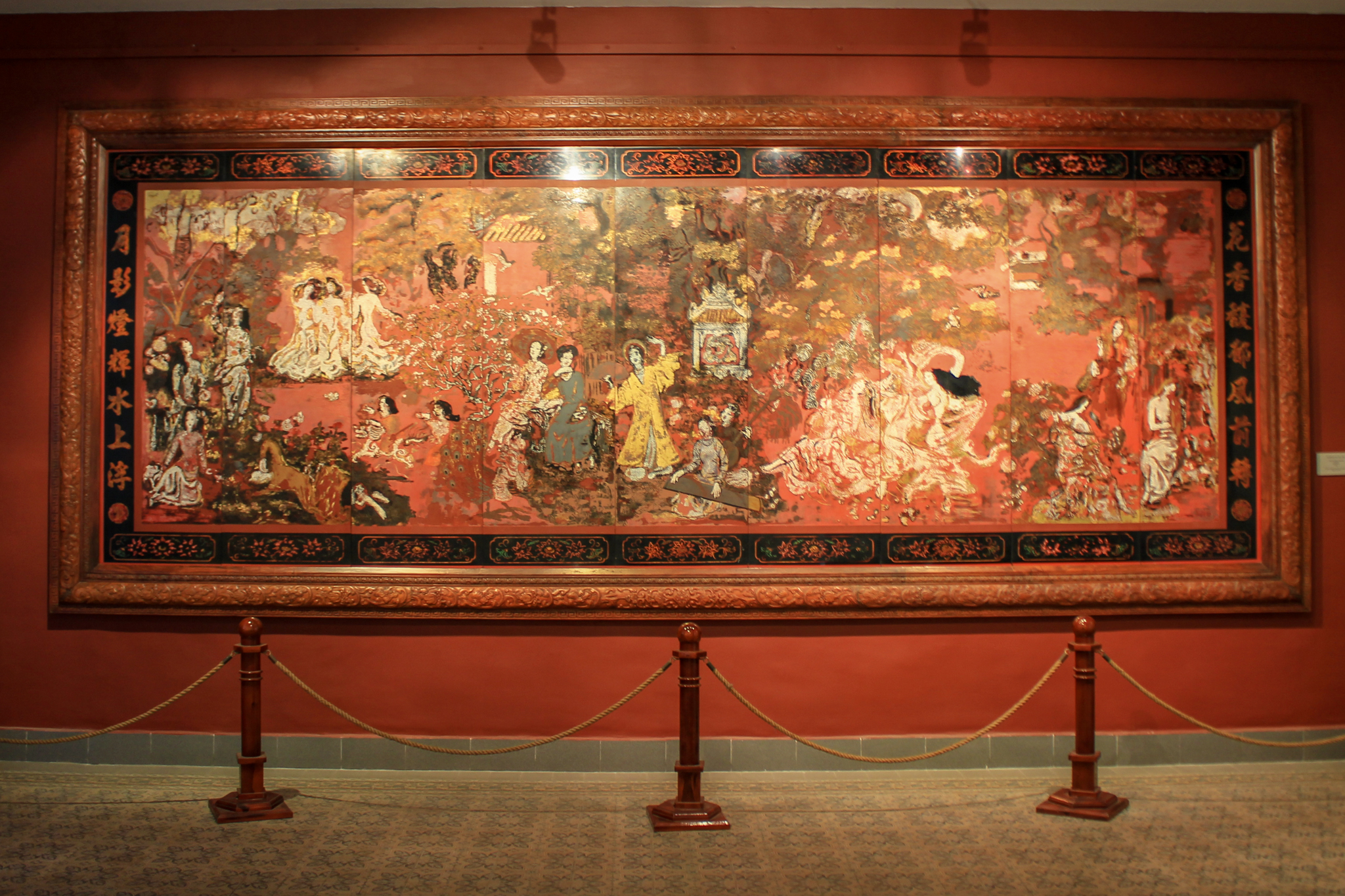
North, Central and South spring garden, lacquer, Ho Chi Minh City Museum of Fine Arts

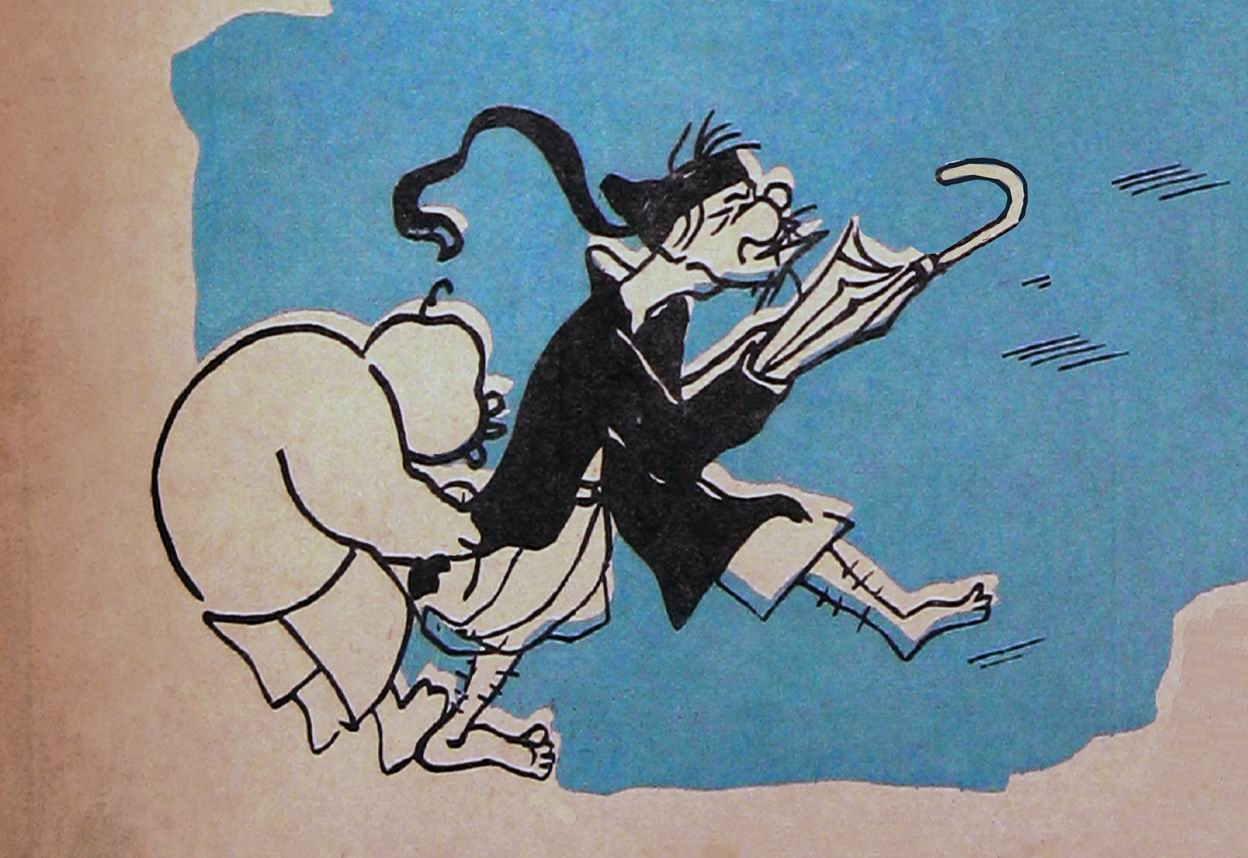
Xã Xệ and Lý Toét
