= Trạng Quỳnh =

Trạng Quỳnh (lit. 'trạng nguyên Quỳnh') was an official under the Vietnamese historical period of Revival Lê dynasty. His character may have inspired the 1930s Vietnamese cartoon satire of Xã Xệ and Lý Toét.

== Content ==
Quynh is also popularized as a cunning and trickster character from traditional Vietnamese folk tales.
