= Nguyễn Huy Tưởng =

Vietnamese revolutionary, writer and playwright

Nguyễn Huy Tưởng (Dục Tú village, Từ Sơn, Bắc Ninh, 6 May 1912 – 25 July 1960) was a Vietnamese revolutionary, writer and playwright. He joined the independence movement at a young age and held positions in the cultural apparatus of the North Vietnam state. In 1996 he was posthumously awarded the Hồ Chí Minh Prize for Literature and Art.

== Works ==
=== Novels ===
- Đêm hội Long Trì (1942)
- An Tư công chúa (1944)
- Truyện Anh Lục (1955)
- Bốn năm sau (1959)
- Lá cờ thêu sáu chữ vàng (1960)
- Sống mãi với Thủ Đô (1960)

=== Plays ===
- Vũ Như Tô(1943)
- Cột đồng Mã Viện (1944)
- Bắc Sơn (1946)
- Những người ở lại (1948)
- Anh Sơ đầu quân (tập kịch, 1949)
- Lũy hoa (1960)
