= Hero Hesman =

Vietnamese science-fiction comic series

Dũng sĩ Hesman
- Author: Nguyễn Hùng Lân
- Publisher: Hanoi Fine Arts Publishing House
- Magazine: Truyện Tranh Trẻ
- Original run: 1993–2019
- Collected volumes: 160

Hero Hesman (Vietnamese: Dũng sĩ Hesman) is a Vietnamese science-fiction comic series created by artist Ignatius Nguyễn Hùng Lân and was published by Hanoi Fine Arts Publishing House. After running for four years, with 159 volumes, Hùng Lân was forced to switch to another project. Up until 2019, with support from the young Vietnamese comic creators, he wrote the 160th volume as a gift to his readers.

== History ==
Hesman originally is an adaptation of Voltron, a Japanese-American cartoon television series with first 4 volumes based on that cartoon. Hesman name is derived from "He's man" (He is a man, not a robot). The next 155 volumes of the series are Hùng Lân's own composition with many events and tens of characters were created.

Most of the characters and events in the story are based on the author's childhood experiences while living in Saigon. The story is like the resonance of the Western-style sci-fi world and some details in the East Asian martial arts books.

Along the storyline, Hùng Lân added many elements of the real robot genre such as energy sources for Hesman to function or upgrades that alter Hesman's appearance substantially and his status as a cognitive robot.

If Voltron is merely a machine, Hesman grew out of this archetype and has been given a personality, which can be described as serious but occasionally displays cunning and a sense of humor. On the other hand, fantastical elements such as magic, wizards and ghosts were also recurrent.

Hesman details an adventure of an intelligent and partially autonomous robot and its human companions. Throughout the series, Hesman and the team travel the Galaxy, fight against various antagonists to defend the universe's peace.

Until the 2020s, this was still recognized as the most widely consumed comic book in Vietnam.

== Plot ==
In the early 21st century, a nuclear war destroyed the Earth. Only a very few people survived and were able to migrate to the three nearest planets : Arus, Hasley and Garrison. Due to the different environmental characteristics of each planet, humans have evolved into different races.

The main setting is the end of the 23rd century, a group of young people on Arus have the ambition to return to Earth to rebuild human civilization. However, the return journey is very uncertain because forces from other planets are attempting to dominate the universe through brutal and environmentally harmful measures.

Faced with an urgent situation, the king of Arus must cooperate with scientist Kazad to create a lion robot capable of moving around planets to protect peace-loving persons.

=== List of characters ===
Hesman Squad

- Hesman : A giant humanoid robot is made up of five lion-shaped robots. "He" is capable of carrying up to five men, flies like a speedship, and inside its right arm hides a very powerful laser light sword. Hesman's hometown and headquarters is Arus the planet.
- Keith : The captain of the group whom specialize in controlling Hesman. He comes from Garrison the planet. Beautiful appearance, good at fighting, talented in command and judging the situation.
- Gadko : Actually has no name, comes from Gadko the planet. The inhabitants of this planet are intellectually underdeveloped, have somewhat ape-like faces, but are exceptionally healthy. After being infected with dead electricity, Gadko's hair turned red, and he also became exceptionally strong. The image of Gadko was originally suggested by Hercules. This is also the character that wins the most sympathy from readers.
- Hawk : A plump, healthy, good-natured, good-natured young man.
- Huy Hùng : A young man of Vietnamese origin, but grew up on a small planet near Arus. He was given a marvellous lens with the ability to emit very harmful radiation. The prototype of this character is the author of the comics.

Force of Thirteen Grand Guardians

- Lord of the planet Doom.
- Biden the Wizzard.

Force of Twenty-Eight Mansions

=== List of volumes ===
- Vol. 01: Cuộc vượt ngục (The Prison Break)
- Vol. 02: Hesman xuất hiện (The Appearance of Hesman)
- Vol. 03: Mãng xà giả dạng (The Fake Python)
- Vol. 04: Lọ nước thần (The Genie Bottle)
- Vol. 05: Dũng sĩ cụt tay (The Armless Warrior)
- Vol. 06: Mưu kế phù thủy (The Scheme of the Wizzard)
- Vol. 07: Hành tinh chết (The Dead Planet)
- Vol. 08: Thu phục Người Thú (The Subjugation of Beastmen)
- Vol. 09: Kẻ hủy diệt (The Destroyer)
- Vol. 10: Nguồn điện chết (The Dead Electric)
- Vol. 11: Giống người kinh dị (The Horror Race)
- Vol. 12: Những kẻ giả dạng (The Fake Persons)
- Vol. 13: Người hùng không gian (The Superhero of the Space)
- Vol. 14: Nữ quái Yanda (Yanda the Monstergirl)
- Vol. 15: Chúa tể vũ trụ (The Lord of the Universe)
- Vol. 16: Chiến công của Gadko (The Victory of Gadko)
- Vol. 17: Tội phạm vũ trụ (The Cosmic Criminal)
- Vol. 18: Bí mật hành tinh chết (The Secret of the Dead Planet)
- Vol. 19: Gián điệp hành tinh chết (The Cyberspy)
- Vol. 20: BÍ ẨN NGOÀI VŨ TRỤ (The Mysteries Out of the Universe)
- Vol. 21: NGƯỜI MÁY PHẢN LOẠN (The Rebellious Robots)
- Vol. 22: BÁU VẬT CỦA ARUS (The Treasure of Arus)
- Vol. 23: TRUY TÌM TỘI PHẠM (The Search for Criminals)
- Vol. 24: THANH GƯƠM THẦN (The Genie Sword)
- Vol. 25: ĐÒN TRỪNG PHẠT (The Punishment)
- Vol. 26: PHÙ THỦY ARMIT (Armit the Wizzard)
- Vol. 27: VŨ KHÍ BÍ MẬT (The Secret Weapon)
- Vol. 28: CUỘC DU HÀNH NGƯỢC THỜI GIAN (The Journey Back in Time)
- Vol. 29: THẦN CHẾT (The Angel of the Death)
- Vol. 30: NGƯỜI HÙNG LÂM NẠN (A Hero in Distress)
- Vol. 31: BÃO TÁP VŨ TRỤ (The Cosmic Storm)
- Vol. 32: NGƯỜI ĐÁ (The Stoneman)
- Vol. 33: TRÁI TIM ROBOT (The Robot Heart)
- Vol. 34: GIỜ HÀNH QUYẾT (An Execution Time)
- Vol. 35: LẠC NGOÀI KHÔNG GIAN (Lost in Space)
- Vol. 36: NỮ HOÀNG BÃO TỐ (The Stormy Queen)
- Vol. 37: KẺ PHẢN BỘI (The Traitor)
- Vol. 38: TIA CHỚP XANH (The Green Lightning)
- Vol. 39: CUỘC CHIẾN KINH HOÀNG
- Vol. 40: SA LƯỚI TỬ THẦN
- Vol. 41: THIÊN THỂ KỲ LẠ
- Vol. 42: NGƯỜI ĐỘT BIẾN
- Vol. 43: BÓNG MA TRÊN HÀNH TINH (The Spectre on the Planet)
- Vol. 44: DIỆT THẦN SẤM
- Vol. 45: VẠCH MẶT KẺ THÙ
- Vol. 46: CUỘC CHẠM TRÁN BẤT NGỜ
- Vol. 47: HÀNH TINH NHÂN TẠO
- Vol. 48: NGƯỜI NỮ ANH HÙNG
- Vol. 49: NHỮNG KẺ SĂN NGƯỜI
- Vol. 50: NHỆN TINH TRẢ THÙ
- Vol. 51: KẺ CHIẾN BẠI
- Vol. 52: THUNG LŨNG TỬ THẦN (A Valley of the Death)
- Vol. 53: BÁC HỌC ĐIÊN (A Mad Scientist)
- Vol. 54: CẢNH SÁT KHÔNG GIAN (The Space Polices)
- Vol. 55: ỐC ĐẢO VŨ TRỤ
- Vol. 56: THẤU KÍNH KỲ DIỆU
- Vol. 57: TỬ THẦN MUÔN MẶT
- Vol. 58: MẶT TRỜI ĐEN (The Black Sun)
- Vol. 59: ROBOT TÁI SINH
- Vol. 60: CHIẾC ÁO GIÁP CỨU NẠN
- Vol. 61: TIA SÁNG CHẾT NGƯỜI
- Vol. 62: VÙNG ĐẤT BÍ HIỂM
- Vol. 63: BÓNG ĐÊM KINH HOÀNG
- Vol. 64: ÂM MƯU NHAM HIỂM
- Vol. 65: THIÊN SỨ CHẾT (The Dead Angel)
- Vol. 66: CHUYẾN BAY BÃO TÁP
- Vol. 67: SỨC MẠNH VÔ HÌNH
- Vol. 68: LƯỠI KIẾM THẦN BÍ
- Vol. 69: ĐỌ SỨC VỚI TỬ THẦN
- Vol. 70: LÃNH CHÚA OMANS (Omans the Landlord)
- Vol. 71: BÀN TAY THÉP (The Steel Hand)
- Vol. 72: QUYỀN LỰC BÓNG TỐI
- Vol. 73: BÃO LỬA TRÊN THIÊN HÀ (Fire Storm in the Galaxy)
- Vol. 74: KẺ THÙ GIẤU MẶT (The Faceless Enemy)
- Vol. 75: HIỆP SĨ VŨ TRỤ (The Chevalier of the Cosmos)
- Vol. 76: SA MẠC TỬ THẦN
- Vol. 77: BẠO CHÚA VŨ TRỤ (The Cosmic Tyrant)
- Vol. 78: NỮ THẦN KIM TINH
- Vol. 79: CHIẾN BINH VŨ TRỤ (The Cosmic Warrior)
- Vol. 80: CÚ ĐẤM SẤM SÉT
- Vol. 81: THANH GƯƠM CÔNG LÝ (The Sword of the Justice)
- Vol. 82: THIÊN THẦN GÃY CÁNH (An Angel with Broken Wings)
- Vol. 83: BÀN TAY MA THUẬT (The Magic Hand)
- Vol. 84: LẠC VÀO TƯƠNG LAI
- Vol. 85: ROBOT BIẾN HÌNH
- Vol. 86: VIÊN KIM CƯƠNG THẦN BÍ
- Vol. 87: CẠM BẪY CHẾT NGƯỜI
- Vol. 88: KHO TÀNG BÍ MẬT
- Vol. 89: SIÊU NHÂN ARUS (Superhero of Arus)
- Vol. 90: MỘC TINH HUYỀN BÍ (the Mystery in Jupiter)
- Vol. 91: ĐÙA VỚI TỬ THẦN
- Vol. 92: CHIẾN CÔNG PHI THƯỜNG
- Vol. 93: LÂU ĐÀI MA QUÁI (The Spooky Castle)
- Vol. 94: ĐỐI MẶT VỚI THẦN CHẾT
- Vol. 95: CÁNH TAY TIN CẬY
- Vol. 96: KING KONG THỨC DẬY
- Vol. 97: VƯỢT QUA GIÔNG TỐ
- Vol. 98: ĐỘI BIỆT ĐỘNG KHÔNG GIAN
- Vol. 99: SIÊU NHÂN MẮC NẠN (Superhero in Distress)
- Vol. 100: THAY HÌNH ĐỔI DẠNG
- Vol. 101: ĐỘI BAY CẢM TỬ
- Vol. 102: LƯỠI GƯƠM ĐỊNH MỆNH
- Vol. 103: ANH HÙNG HỘI NGỘ
- Vol. 104: SÓNG THẦN VŨ TRỤ
- Vol. 105: TRUY TÌM KHO BÁU
- Vol. 106: NHỮNG KẺ CỨU NẠN
- Vol. 107: MỘT CUỘC THÁCH ĐẤU
- Vol. 108: BẠO LOẠN GIỮA THIÊN HÀ
- Vol. 109: KẺ THÙ VÔ HÌNH
- Vol. 110: BỘ ÓC SIÊU PHÀM
- Vol. 111: TẤM GƯƠNG DŨNG CẢM
- Vol. 112: THOÁT HIỂM (The Escape)
- Vol. 113: TRẬN ĐẤU QUYẾT TỬ (A Death Match)
- Vol. 114: NGƯỜI KHÁCH BÍ HIỂM (The Mysterious Guest)
- Vol. 115: NỖI KINH HOÀNG Ở HASLEY (The Horror in Hasley)
- Vol. 116: SỨC MẠNH VẠN NĂNG
- Vol. 117: CUỘC SĂN ĐUỔI QUYẾT LIỆT
- Vol. 118: BAY VỀ QUÁ KHỨ
- Vol. 119: VƯƠNG QUỐC QUÁI DỊ
- Vol. 120: CÚ ĐẤM QUYẾT ĐỊNH
- Vol. 121: CHẠY TRỐN TỬ THẦN
- Vol. 122: ANH HÙNG VÔ DANH
- Vol. 123: THIÊN HÀ BÍ ẨN
- Vol. 124: NÚI ĐÁ TIÊN TRI
- Vol. 125: ÁNH SÁNG QUYỀN LỰC
- Vol. 126: ANH HÙNG BẤT ĐẮC DĨ
- Vol. 127: BÃO CÁT SA MẠC (The Simoom)
- Vol. 128: LUỒNG SÉT VÔ HÌNH
- Vol. 129: ĐÔI MẮT KỲ DIỆU
- Vol. 130: BIỂN CHẾT (The Sea of the Death)
- Vol. 131: THÁM TỬ KHÔNG GIAN
- Vol. 132: ĐÒN SẤM SÉT
- Vol. 133: CHIẾN BINH THÉP (The Steel Warrior)
- Vol. 134: BÁC HỌC QUÁI DỊ
- Vol. 135: BÃO LỬA KINH HOÀNG
- Vol. 136: MẶT NẠ MUÔN HÌNH
- Vol. 137: MŨI TÊN THẦN
- Vol. 138: NGƯỜI HAI MẶT
- Vol. 139: SỨC LỰC THẦN BÍ
- Vol. 140: MÁY TÍNH KỲ DIỆU
- Vol. 141: KHO TÀNG DƯỚI ĐÁY BIỂN
- Vol. 142: VỤ MẤT TÍCH BÍ ẨN
- Vol. 143: CƠN BÃO CHẾT NGƯỜI
- Vol. 144: SỰ HI SINH CAO CẢ
- Vol. 145: DÒNG MÁU THÉP (The Steel Blood)
- Vol. 146: ĐÁM MÂY BÍ HIỂM (The Mysterious Clouds)
- Vol. 147: TÊN SÁT NHÂN GIẤU MẶT
- Vol. 148: BIỆT ĐỘI KHỦNG BỐ
- Vol. 149: QUÁI NHÂN BẤT TRỊ
- Vol. 150: VỤ MƯU SÁT KHÔNG THÀNH
- Vol. 151: NGƯỜI NGUYÊN TỬ
- Vol. 152: CHIẾC ÁO ĐIỆN QUANG
- Vol. 153: PHIÊU LƯU TRONG LÒNG ĐẤT
- Vol. 154: Xông vào giông bão (Rush into the Storm)
- Vol. 155: Cơn giận của thần núi (The Anger of the Mountain God)
- Vol. 156: Sa lầy ở Beta (The Quagmire in Beta)
- Vol. 157: Hiệp sĩ Bạch Kim (Platinum the Chevalier)
- Vol. 158: Vòng vây tội ác (Circle of Crime)
- Vol. 159: Gã khổng lồ vui tính (The Funny Giant)
- Vol. 160: Người về từ cõi chết (A Man Come Back from the Dead)

== Legacy ==
In 2019, following the suggestions of fans, author Hùng Lân decided to make the 160th volume to complete all of the series.

== See also ==
- Vietnamese superman
- He-Man and She-Ra
