= List of non-Japanese Doraemon versions =

Doraemon is a popular Japanese manga and anime series created by Fujiko F. Fujio and published by Shogakukan and TV Asahi. The series has been released in many parts of the world.

== America ==
=== English-language Americas ===
Country	Manga First Published	Anime First Broadcast
United States and Canada	November 2013 on Amazon Kindle	Turner Broadcasting System acquired the US rights to Doraemon in 1985 in a co-production with the scandal-plagued Canadian children's animation company Cinar (now known as WildBrain), entitled The Adventures of Albert and Sidney. Both companies planned to air the first 50 episodes that year on what was then called SuperStation WTBS, but due to unknown circumstances, the series did not air on the network as planned. It did, however, end up airing on CBC TV 8 in Barbados during the late 1980s and early 1990s. TV Japan aired Doraemon in its original Japanese version without subtitles in the US and Canada from May 2012 until March 2014. The U.S. dub of Doraemon started airing on 7 July 2014 on Disney XD in the US, Disney XD aired a few episodes of the show in Canada in the summer of 2015 for two weeks before pulling it. On 14 November 2008, Doraemon: Nobita's Dinosaur 2006 was screened in its original Japanese version with English subtitles in the Washington, D.C. area, marking the first time Doraemon ever made an appearance in the United States. Bang Zoom! Entertainment premiered an English-dubbed version of Stand by Me Doraemon at the Tokyo International Film Festival on 24 October 2014. Foreign streaming service Netflix released an English dub of Stand by Me Doraemon 2 in Japan on 6 November 2021 featuring the return of the voice cast of the English dub of the 2005 anime. Netflix also released the dub around the world on 24 December 2021. In North America, Viz Media is the master licensor for the series, but like all other Fujiko Fujio properties, it never had an English release. Back when the company was known as Viz Communications, they had plans to publish the manga in English in the early 1990s. But, due to the large amount of crude humor, and perverted moments that would have to be censored (one example being the numerous bath scenes featuring the female character, Shizuka), the license was eventually removed. The Doraemon Exhibition originally presented at the Fujiko F. Fujio Museum was heading overseas for the first time. The "Meet! Doraemon" exhibit was shown in at Bishop Museum in Honolulu, Hawaii. The exhibit opened on 15 February-20 April 2014. Telemundo aired the Latin American Spanish dub of the 1979 anime in Puerto Rico making this the first time the 1979 series could be seen on American airwaves from 2001 to 2004.

=== Brazil ===
The 1979 series had a first distribution attempt by Everest Video in the late 1980s, but the acquisition did not materialize due to the high cost of license at that time. In October 1992, distributed by WTC Comunicações, Doraemon was broadcast under the Doraemon, O Super-Gato Portuguese title on Rede Manchete children program Clube da Criança. However, the number of dubbed episodes was less and the series was not successful. In 2001, Creative Licensing tried to redistribute the series on television, but was unsuccessful.

In 2014, Sato Company in association with Rose Entertainment from Mexico, distributed the 2005 series under the Doraemon, O Gato do Futuro Portuguese title.

=== Spanish-language Latin America ===
The 1979 series first was dubbed in Latin America since early 1980's, known as "Las aventuras del Gato Cósmico", this first dub was present until 1995, later, it was licensed by Rose Entertainment in 1999 for the entire Latin American region. A Latin American Spanish dub produced in Mexico under the Doraemon, el gato cósmico Spain's title has been distributed in most countries. In 2014, Rose Entertainment licensed the 2005 series under the same title.

Country	Manga first published	Anime First Broadcast
Colombia	Has never been released.	1979 Series: 11 October 2003, on Caracol TV
Ecuador	Has never been released.	1979 Series: 1 April 2002, on Ecuavisa; 2005 Series: 2 March 2015, on Ecuavisa
Pan-regional	Has never been released.	1979 Series: 2 September 2019, on Movistar Play; 2005 Series: 10 December 2014, on Netflix

== Asia ==
=== East Asia ===
Region	Manga first published	Television series first broadcast / release status	Language	Local name(s)
China	1989 as 叮当	First broadcast on GDTV from 1989 to 1991 as 叮当, Doraemon's dubbing is Zhang Lin (only 26 episodes were shown); Second broadcast on CCTV-2 in 1991 as 机器猫, Doraemon's dubbing is Dong Hao, Zhang Lu and Liu Chunyan (only 113 episodes were shown); Third broadcast on CCTV-14 in 2007 as 哆啦A梦, Doraemon's dubbing is Zhang Limin; Third broadcast on many cartoon channels from 2004 to 2015 as 哆啦A梦, Doraemon's dubbing is Li Ye (only 300 episodes were shown) (All of these are 1979 anime only)	Mandarin Chinese; Uyghur	哆啦A梦
Taiwan	1996 as 哆啦A夢 was officially licensed publication.	First introduced to broadcast in 1996 on Taiwan Television, Chinese Television System afterwards.	Mandarin Chinese	哆啦A夢
Hong Kong	First introduced in 1973 through a children magazine "Children Paradise" (兒童樂園), followed by "Seal Comics" (海豹叢書) throughout the 1980s (administered by Charles Lam Productions Ltd). Current official publication licensed in 1992. Publisher: Culturecom (文化傳信).	First broadcast in August 1981 on TVB Jade The first overseas broadcast in Doraemon history.	Cantonese	叮噹, 多啦A夢 (Cantonese Yale: Dōlāēimūng)
South Korea	2001	First broadcast between 2001–2002 by MBC then Anione and Champ TV from 2006–present.	Korean	도라에몽 (Revised Romanization: Doraemong)

=== South Asia ===
Region	Manga first published	Television series first broadcast / release status	Language	Local name(s)
India	The manga hasn't been released.	It started airing on Hungama TV from May 2005, which was the introduction of the Doraemon franchise in India. Since 19 November 2010, Hungama TV's sister channel, Disney Channel India has been rerunning the old dubbed episodes which have already been broadcast by Hungama TV. Hindi-dubbed episodes started with the 1979 Doraemon series. Later episodes of the 2005 Doraemon series started airing on Hungama TV and Disney Channel India in October and November 2013. New seasons of Doraemon are available on JioHotstar in Hindi, Tamil and Telugu. As of 2023, 35 films (including special films) have been dubbed into Hindi, Tamil and Telugu and aired on Hungama TV and Disney Channel also two of them have been released in theatres. Starting from June 2025, the films started being aired on Nickelodeon Sonic, with Kannada language dubs being produced and aired alongside the already existing Hindi, Tamil, and Telugu dubs. Disney India was banned in Pakistan and Bangladesh due to the non-availability of English and local dubs of content including Doraemon. The channel was similarly removed from air in Sri Lanka and Bhutan.	Hindi; Tamil; Telugu; Kannada (films only)	डोरेमोन (Hindi) டோரேமான் (Tamil) డోరేమాన్ (Telugu)
Bangladesh	The manga hasn't been released.	Bangladesh got Disney Channel India, which used to air Doraemon. In February 2013, Bangladesh banned the airing of unapproved foreign satellite television channels, particularly Disney Channel India, due to concerns that children would learn Hindi instead of Bengali. The government also banned other channels such as Disney XD India and Pogo TV. The Hindi dub was not completely banned as Hungama TV was still available. However Hungama TV stopped airing Doraemon in January 2018. Later on, a Bengali dub was brought by Ddhoni Chitra Ltd. for episodes of the 1979 anime, which started airing on the cable channel Asian TV on 1 April 2014, although the dub has stopped airing on the channel since.	Bengali	ডোরেমন

=== Southeast Asia ===
Region	Manga first published	Television series first broadcast / release status	Language	Local name(s)
Indonesia	1991 by Elex Media Komputindo	Doraemon was first aired by RCTI, as its first program during trial broadcast on 13 November 1988. For two years, until 2 December 1990, RCTI stopped airing Doraemon, and later started again on 7 December 1990 on Sunday at 9:00 AM (WIB). Later the airtime was moved to 8:30 AM on 12 May 1991 and finally to 8:00 AM on 2 June 1991. RCTI later maintained this airtime until early 2021 and still aired the cartoon until 28 December 2025 (from 2011 onward they aired the 2005 version), making it the longest running animated television program in the country, continuously airing for 35 years. It was also aired by former affiliate SCTV from 27 August 1990 until 22 August 1993. RCTI also aired this series every day in mid-2000s and on Saturday in early 2000s, but these airtimes were short-lived. In 2018, the airtime was extended to one hour (from 8:00 AM to 9:00 AM on Sunday), but later in early 2021 was reduced to original (30 minutes) and the timeslot moved to 8:30 AM, on 14 April 2024 to 8:00 AM, and finally on 18 May 2025 to 8:30 AM. On 4 January 2026, RCTI pulled the series from the Sunday 8:30 AM slot. There are some important things about Doraemon's airing in Indonesia. During its early broadcast (mainly from 1990–1991), RCTI sometimes stopped Doraemon's broadcasting, however this was not continued after 1991. Doraemon was also the first Japanese cartoon to be aired in Indonesia (during this time, RCTI mostly aired US cartoons). Doraemon's airing in Indonesia also had differences with original Japanese version: the title card, especially from 1979 version were edited and replaced, and because of advertisements, sometimes RCTI cut the length of episodes (for example, from 10 minutes to 5-8 minutes). From 2011–2014, despite having officially aired the 2005 version, sometimes RCTI still aired the 1979 version albeit with changes of title card and voiceover. The cessation of broadcast on RCTI since 2026 was caused by changes in audience behavior, licensing and broadcasting rights issues, and a shift in program strategy. In addition to original series, RCTI sometimes aired Doraemon movies in morning, on weekdays. This series has high ratings: on one occasion (November 2017), Doraemon's rating was higher than soap operas, a staple for many television stations in Indonesia.	Bahasa Indonesia	Doraemon
Malaysia	1992-April 2017 (Tora Aman); December 2018-present (Gempak Starz)	First broadcast from 6 January 1990 until 29 December 2002 by TV1. Later moved to NTV7 from 5 January 2003 until now. Also broadcast by 8TV.	Bahasa Malaysia; Mandarin Chinese; Tamil	Doraemon 多啦A夢 (Chinese) டோரேமான் (Tamil)
Philippines	Doraemon was first published by JLINE COMICS CENTER and translated to Filipino on 1 December 2009.	First broadcast on 1 December 1999 on GMA (1979 TV series) and on 27 May 2019 Yey! (2005 TV series)	Filipino, Cebuano or a few other Philippine languages in selected local GMA TV channels.	The character Gian is known as Damulag (literally "big person" or "big kid" in Filipino). Doraemon is pronounced as "do-REI-mon".
Singapore	1990	An English dub of the 1979 anime produced by Singaporean company Voiceovers Unlimited (licensed by Odex Ltd.) for Channel i aired from 2002 to 2003. Channel 8 aired the 1979 anime between 1992 and 2001 in Cantonese dubbing, and between 2005 and 2016 in Mandarin dubbed, and has remained airing at the same time slot. The 2005 anime began airing from 14 February 2016, and repeat telecasts aired from 27 July 2016.	Malay (English dubbed with Singapore Mandarin subtitles)	多啦A夢 (Chinese), Doraemon (English). The previous Chinese name 小叮噹 is also used.
Thailand	1970s (licensed), 1982 (unlicensed)	1982 on Channel 9, 1994 on Modernine TV	Thai	โดราเอมอน, โดเรม่อน
Cambodia		2014 on TV3 Asia	Khmer	ដូរ៉ាអិម៉ុន
Vietnam	11 December 1992 (Đôrêmon version, uncopyright); 1996 (licensed); 29 May 2010 (Doraemon version, licensed)	In the 2000s, VTV1 and VTC1 aired some episodes of the 1979 anime. Later HTV3 aired 52 episodes of the 1979 anime from 9 January to 4 July 2010, then the remaining of the anime from 20 November 2014 to 2 December 2015. Later, HTV3 aired the 2005 anime since 3 December 2015. HTV3 also aired 17 movies from 7 December 2012 to 27 December 2013. From 2013, Doraemon movies were licensed in cinema theaters. The Stand By Me Doraemon film aired on 1 June 2015 on K+ NS.	Vietnamese	Đôrêmon (1992–2010), Doraemon (2010)

=== Middle East ===
Country	Manga first published	Television series first broadcast / release status	Language	Local name(s)
Israel	The manga hasn't been released.	First broadcast in 2004 on Fox Kids/Jetix with the 1979 series and in 2014 on Disney Channel Israel with the 2005 series	Hebrew	דורימון

The show was first broadcast in Arab countries in 1995. Since 7 March 2016 a dub of the Doraemon 2005 series airs on Spacetoon.

The first series of Doraemon had a localized Arabic name, being "Abqoor" عبقور, roughly meaning "Mini Genius". In addition from Doraemon's name, all other characters names are localized, and there are no episode cards, apart from a black screen with the episode number (using the Hindu-Arabic numeral system). It also features an original theme song.

In Iran, it was broadcast on IRIB TV1 under the name, دورایمون.

== Europe ==
Country	Manga First Published	Anime First Broadcast
France	2007	2003 by M6 and Fox Kids; 2014 by Boing (France). Since October 2025, an official French language YouTube channel has been uploading a new dub of the 2005 series, which will consist of 26 segments.
Italy	2003	1982 by Rai 2; from 2003 by Italia 1 and Boing (Italy). 102 early episodes (each one including 3 segments) from the 1979 series were dubbed in Italian and aired first on Rai 2 and then on local broadcasters, featuring the theme songs Il gatto Doraemon sung by Oliver Onions and La canzone di Doraemon (a cover of the Japanese theme "Boku Doraemon") sung by Il Coro I Nostri Figli di Nora Orlandi. From 2003 Italia 1 started airing most of the 1979 series with a new dub and the theme song titled Doraemon, sung by Cristina D'Avena, enjoying massive success. Since the 2010s the 1979 series was moved to Boing (Italy); the 2005 series started airing in 2014 alongside the previous one.
Poland		2014 by Disney XD (Poland) and 2015 by Disney Channel Poland.
Portugal	The manga hasn't been released.	2000 by Canal Panda in Spanish with subtitles (before 2010) with ratings success in the core demographic of the channel in the early 2000s and dubbed in Portuguese (since 2011), 2001 by RTP1 and RTP2 dubbed in Portuguese, 2009 by Panda Biggs with the 2005 episodes and the 1979 episodes in Spanish with subtitles in Portuguese, 2015 by Cartoon Network Portugal with the 2005 episodes and some of the 1979 episodes dubbed in Portuguese, 2019 by Boomerang Portugal and 2025 by Panda Kids with the 2005 episodes dubbed in Portuguese
Russia	1990	1993 with Japan Foundation and aired on Channel One Russia.
Spain	1994	1993 by TVE-2 and 1994 by Televisió de Catalunya, Canal Nou, Euskal Telebista, Canal Sur, TVG and other autonomical televisions (FORTA). Apart from running now on FORTA autonomical televisions network, the Spanish version also runs on Boing, a channel that airs around the whole country, giving it even a more mainstream appeal. In fact Doraemon acts as the unofficial mascot of that channel, its logo sharing the same blue color and the series airing during most of its daytime programming. The Doraemon airings on Boing offer a choice between Spanish and Japanese audio, and also offer Spanish teletext closed captioning. Doraemon is translated into four languages including Basque, Catalan (including a Valencian version since the early 1990s and a Balearic one since the mid-2000s) and Galician in addition to Spanish. The first Doraemon film was televised in 2000.
Turkey		2014 by Disney Channel Turkey.
Ukraine	1990	1993 with Japan Foundation and aired on UA:Pershyi.
United Kingdom		17 August 2015 by Boomerang.

== Oceania ==
Country	Manga First Published	Anime First Broadcast
Australia	The manga hasn't been published.	26 January 2015 on Network Ten
