= Xã Xệ and Lý Toét =

Vietnamese satirical characters

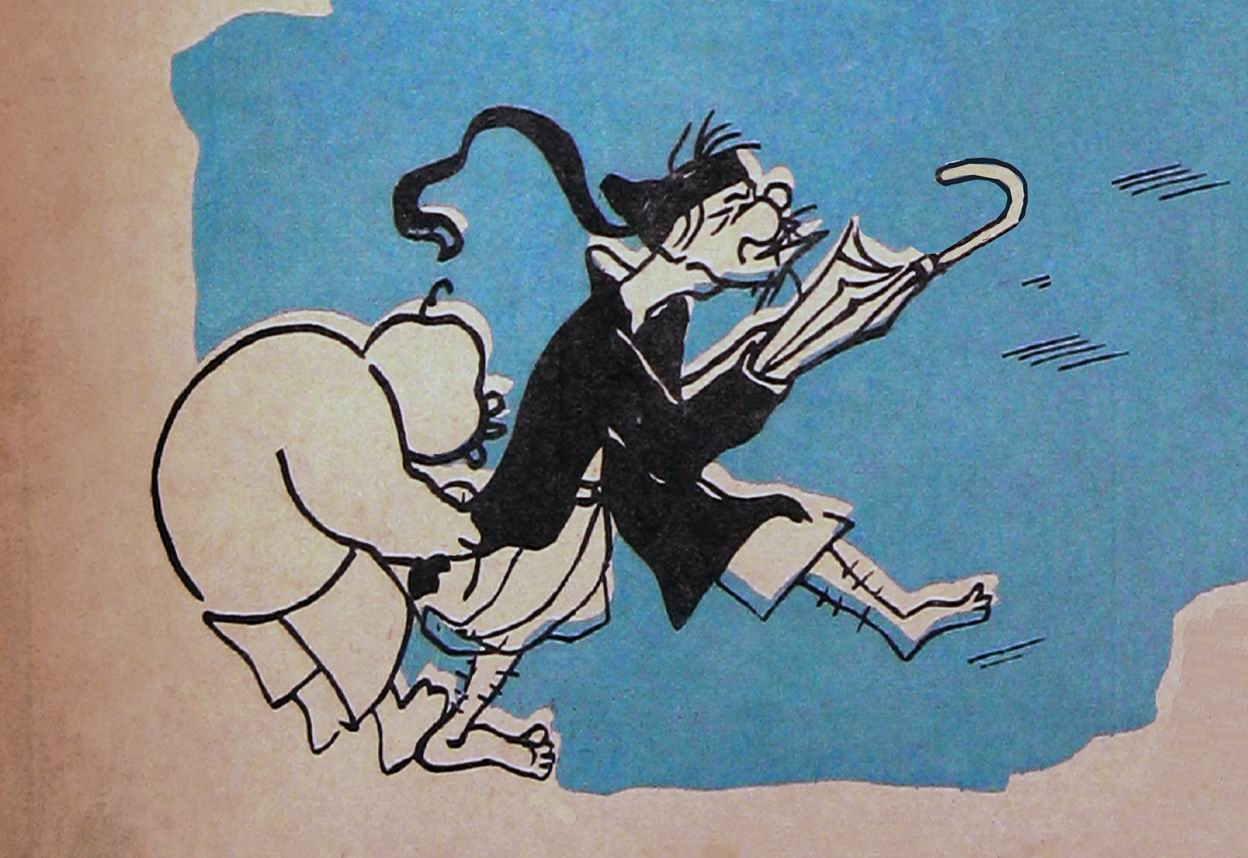

Group publication information
- Publisher: Tự Lực Văn Đoàn (Self-Reliant Literary Group)
- First appearance: 1932
- Created by: Nhất Linh; Nguyễn Gia Trí

Xã Xệ and Lý Toét

Creative team
- Artist(s): Nguyễn Tường Tam (Đông Sơn) Lê Minh Đức (Bút Sơn); Tô Ngọc Vân (Tô Tử, Ái Mĩ); Nguyễn Thứ Lễ (Lê Ta) Nguyễn Tường Long (Tứ Ly)
- Creator(s): Nhất Linh; Nguyễn Gia Trí

Xã Xệ and Lý Toét are a satirical duo which became popular fiction characters in sketches published as caricatures through the columns of the modernist Vietnamese newspapers in Tonkin from the 1930s to the 1940s. Their influence went beyond the simple cartoon as they became archetypes of the transformations that Vietnam was going through, so much so that Lý Toét could be considered an "important figure in the urban world of 1930s Vietnam."

== History ==
=== A cultural hybrid: from Vietnamese satire to Western cartoons of the 1920s ===
Xã Xệ and Lý Toét may have been inspired from Vietnamese tradition through the figures of Trạng Quỳnh (Master Quynh), the archetype of the shrewd lower-level literatus, and Trạng Lợn (Master Pig) who represented the court official as a fool. Represented often in Vietnamese folk theatre, these two traditional figures may have served as a background for these two characters.

Foreign influences may have influenced the caricatures as well. Their publisher, Nhất Linh, has spent time studying in France in the late 1920s and early 1930s. The sketching style of Xã Xệ and Lý Toét echoes the drawing style of Le Canard Enchainé, a French satirical journal launched in 1915. The archetype comic duo of a fat and a thin character is also reminiscent of the most famous comic duo of all, Laurel and Hardy, started in 1927, and it was known in Vietnam as "Mập – Ốm" (The Fat and the Skinny).

=== A Vietnamese printing success from South to North ===
The first satirical cartoon including the figure of Lý Toét was first published by Nhất Linh in his newspaper Phong Hóa ("Customs", or "Mores") after he took over the Hanoi weekly in 1932. It was the first satirical journal in Indochina. In 1936, a new paper called Ngày Nay ("These Days") was created to integrate this humour in a more serious and social-focused publication. Because of their catchy humor, Lý Toét also allowed Phong Hoa to be "the first northern [Vietnam] journal to attract the attention of readers in the south [Vietnam]". After the victory of the Popular Front in France, freedom of the press also allowed for a more direct political engagement even in cartoons.

=== Spreading humor across French Indochina ===
The duo was featured in more than 180 cartoons between 1934 and 1940.

The journal's humoristic tone was a counterpoint to the serious and almost dramatic tone adopted by other Vietnamese intellectuals and chroncists such as Phạm Quỳnh. The characters also indulged in insiders' jokes, as when they indirectly compared Khái Hưng's weekly column in their own newspaper to "a rash caused by undercooked beans".

The archetypal characters were so popular so copycat characters were created in competing newspapers such as the Central and Northern News (Trung Bắc Tân Văn) or Youth (Thanh Niên). Others found them downgrading for the Vietnamese peasantry.

In the decades after, the duo of Xa Xe and Ly Toet was copied in other newspapers as in the national high school newspaper Học sinh where Ly Toet was imitated in 1939. Their characters also lived on in various theatrical forms such as Chèo, Tuồng, Cai luong, dialogue, and even poetry.

In the former French protectorate of Cambodia, Neay Koy and Neay Krom is a comic duo which is a Khmer equivalent. "Neay" refers to a small village chief and the Koy and Krem similarly refers to their clumsiness. Their comic relationship which originated in Lakhon Bassac has become a popular television show.

== Characters ==
Although many of the drawings came from various contributors, the characters were always depicted with distinguishing features which to be depicted in similar and readily recognizable forms.

While the main protagonists where the duo of Xã Xệ and Lý Toét, others secondary characters also appeared such as Bang Bạnh.

Lý Toét was created by Nhất Linh, but Xã Xệ and Bang Bạnh were created by painter Nguyễn Gia Trí under the pseudonym Rigt. Other famous illustrators of that period contributed to the sketches such as:

- Nguyễn Tường Tam (Đông Sơn)
- Lê Minh Đức (Bút Sơn)
- Tô Ngọc Vân (Tô Tử, Ái Mĩ)
- Nguyễn Thứ Lễ (Lê Ta)
- Nguyễn Tường Long (Tứ Ly...)

=== Lý Toét ===
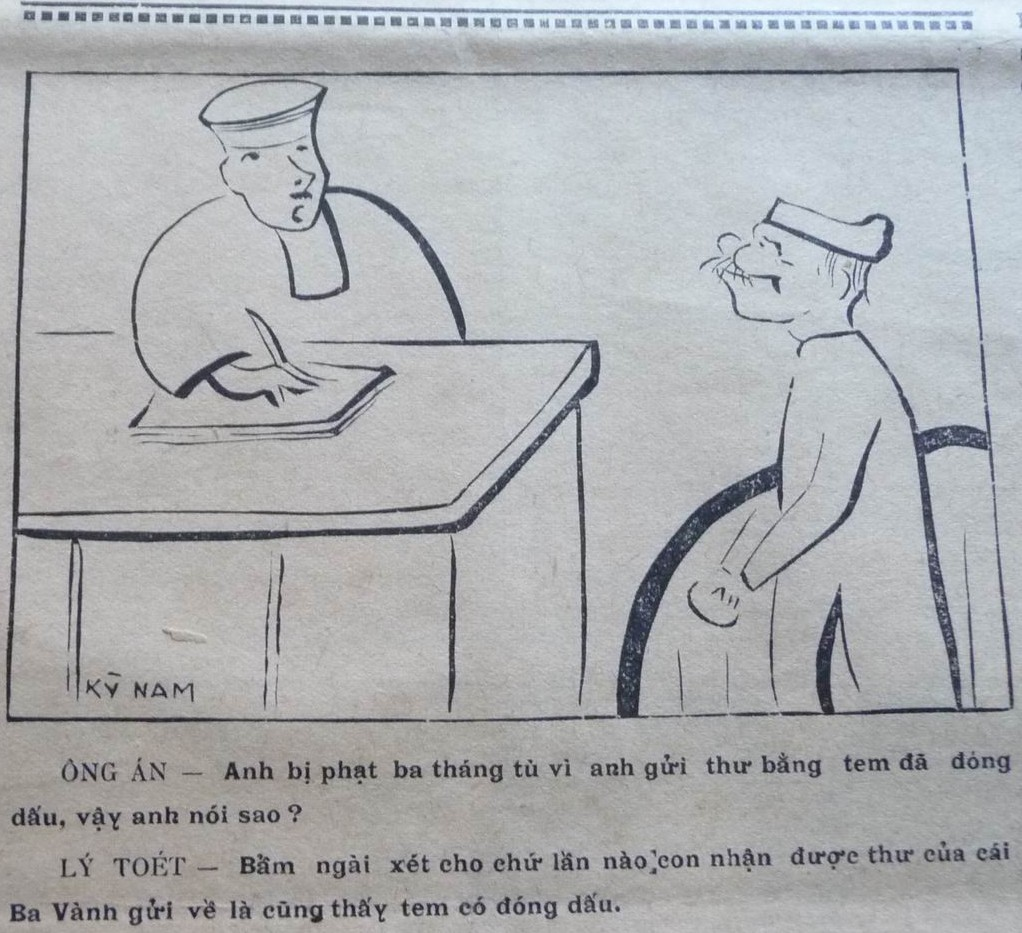
Lý Toét in front the judge: injustice is a frequent theme in this classic Vietnamese cartoon.

Ly Toet was "the first sustained fictitious character in any Vietnamese newspaper". His omnipresent character can be described as a "country bumpkin". "Lý" refers to lý trưởng, a village mayor, while "toét" means "hypocrite". He is an elderly, skinny, poorly dressed, ugly character. His traditional topknot Vietnamese, his moustache, his unshaved whiskers identify him as well as his umbrella. He has a daughter, Cô Ba Vành (Miss Three Rings), and a son named Toe who are both minor characters. While he likes to curse at "Western" [French] men and their "Western habits", he often makes a fool of himself by his own ignorance and superstition.The character was inspired from seen by Nhất Linh in a cartoon published in a June 1931 issue of Women's Chronicle (Phụ nữ thời đàm). He first appeared in Phong Hóa on 26 May 1933.

=== Xã Xệ ===
Xã Xệ or Bác Xã is the "rotund sidekick" of Lý Toét. His alliterative moniker means "the Saggy commune Chief." He also wears a traditional Áo ngũ thân flowing tunic distinctive of Vietnamese literati of the time without the turban however. His single hair sticks out from the back of his bald head in a way reminiscent of the pig's tail. He first appeared in a cartoon submitted by one of the paper's reader on 16 March 1934.

=== Bang Bạnh ===
Bang Bạnh is one of the secondary characters who serves as a middle player between Xã Xệ and Lý Toét. His appearances are far less recurrent than the two others.

== Themes: from social satire to political awareness ==
The main theme of the Xã Xệ and Lý Toét cartoons is the conflict between tradition and modernity especially because of the "disparity between traditional Sino-Vietnamese superstitions and modern science".

As dissatisfaction grew among the Indochinese populations against the French colonization, these characters were "a useful mouthpiece for Vietnamese to voice criticism of France and its imperial project". The cartoon was meant to criticize colonialism and social inequalities in a way that broke away with the communist rhetoric.

While the humor is often at the expense of the elder generation, it is also a warning against the dangers of modernity and an expression of the fear and insecurity of certain Vietnamese in face of a changing future, as could also be seen from the Dumb Luck of Vũ Trọng Phụng.

== Bibliography ==
- Dutton, George (1 February 2007). "Lýý Toéét in the City: Coming to Terms with the Modern in 1930s Vietnam". Journal of Vietnamese Studies. 2 (1): 80–108. doi:10.1525/vs.2007.2.1.80. ISSN 1559-372X.
- Dương, Đoàn Ánh; Kiên, Phùng; Tiến, Nguyễn Mạnh; Tuấn, Mai Anh; Nguyễn, Martina Thucnhi (4 July 2020). Phong Hóa thời hiện đại: Tự Lực văn đoàn trong tình thế thuộc địa ở Việt Nam đầu thế kỷ 20 (in Vietnamese). Sách Tao Đàn. ISBN 978-604-3-06142-0.
- Nguyen, Martina Thucnhi (2021). On Our Own Strength: The Self-Reliant Literary Group and Cosmopolitan Nationalism in Late Colonial Vietnam. University of Hawai'i Press. doi:10.2307/j.ctv105b9bn.7. ISBN 978-0-8248-8333-1. JSTOR j.ctv105b9bn. S2CID 243064874.

== Links ==
- Một góc văn chương bị bỏ quên
- Bang Bạnh – Xã Xệ – Lý Toét: Những "siêu sao" biếm họa Việt Nam
