= Thần đồng Đất Việt =

Vietnamese comic series

- Cover of Thần đồng Đất Việt's first issue.
- Author: Lê Linh
- Illustrator: Lê Linh
- Publisher: Tre Publishing House
- Publication date: 16 February 2002 - 20 February 2005

Thần đồng Đất Việt (transl. Vietnamese child prodigy, Northern Vietnamese: [tʰə̆n˨˩ ɗə̆wŋ͡m˨˩ ɗə̆t̚˧˥ viət̚˧ˀ˩]) is a Vietnamese comic series created by Lê Linh and published by the Phan Thị Publishing Company, in cooperation with the Tre Publishing House. The comic series chronicles the life of the Vietnamese people (along with their culture) during the Vietnamese imperial period. A game show based on and has the same name as the comic series was broadcast on VTC1 in 2006.

== Plot ==
The comic series is set in the Later Lê dynasty, but the events that happened in the comics are largely fictional. However, most main events are indeed inspired by real historical tales of Vietnam. The story follows the life of the Vietnamese child prodigy Lê Tí (also humorously called Tí Sún meaning Toothless Tí) together with his friends named Sửu Ẹo, Dần Béo, and Cả Mẹo. In Tí's previous life, he was Văn Tinh Quân—an immortal living in heaven who possessed immense knowledge. The Jade Emperor then commanded Văn Tinh Quân to reincarnate onto Earth to help the country of Đại Việt (now Vietnam), which explained the cause of Tí's two missing teeth—the Jade Emperor had to hit him physically in order to force Tí to leave heaven.

His life was already unusual ever since the day he was born. Tí's mother, Hai Hậu, gave birth to him while resting on a rock after working on the farm. From a young age, Tí presented himself as a respectful, studious, and intelligent son. His teacher, Đồ Kiết, was amazed by Tí's knowledge. In his home village of Phan Thị, he was able to use his divine intelligence to help his mother, friends, and fellow villagers in solving problems around the village. After passing the Vietnamese Confucian examinations, he became Đại Việt's youngest principal graduate (Trạng Nguyên). After this, he also managed to get recognised by the Chinese Ming dynasty—also known in the comic series as "Bắc quốc" (lit. 'Northern Country')—as a bi-national principal graduate.

With friends by his side, Tí made tremendous efforts in helping the Đại Việt king prevent the Chinese from invading his country, while also dealing with the sneaky ambassadors that China sent. In the king's palace, Tí presented himself as an honest advisor. As a result, he quickly attracted the love and attention from princess Phương Thìn. However, Phương Thìn's affections for Tí resulted in the jealousy Tào Hống, the nation's grand chancellor. Hống (along with his family) made multiple attempts to embarrass Tí publicly, though most of the attempts ended up failing.

Thanks to his extraordinary intellect, Tí was entrusted by the King to be the ambassador for Vietnam. While holding this position, Tí faced multiple assassination attempts and smear campaigns, nearly ending his life. Yet despite everything, Tí still continued to support and help the people of his village back home.

== Characters ==
There are 12 main characters in the series, with names that correspond to the Chinese zodiacs: Tí (Mouse), Sửu (Ox), Dần (Tiger), Mẹo (from Mão for Rabbit or Cat), Thìn (Dragon), Tỵ (Snake), Ngọ (Horse), Mùi (Goat), Thân (Monkey), Dậu (Rooster), Tuất (Dog) and Hợi (Pig). Of the 12 main characters of the series, guard Dương Bá Tuất is the only adult.
