= Tô Hoài =

Vietnamese writer (1920–2014)

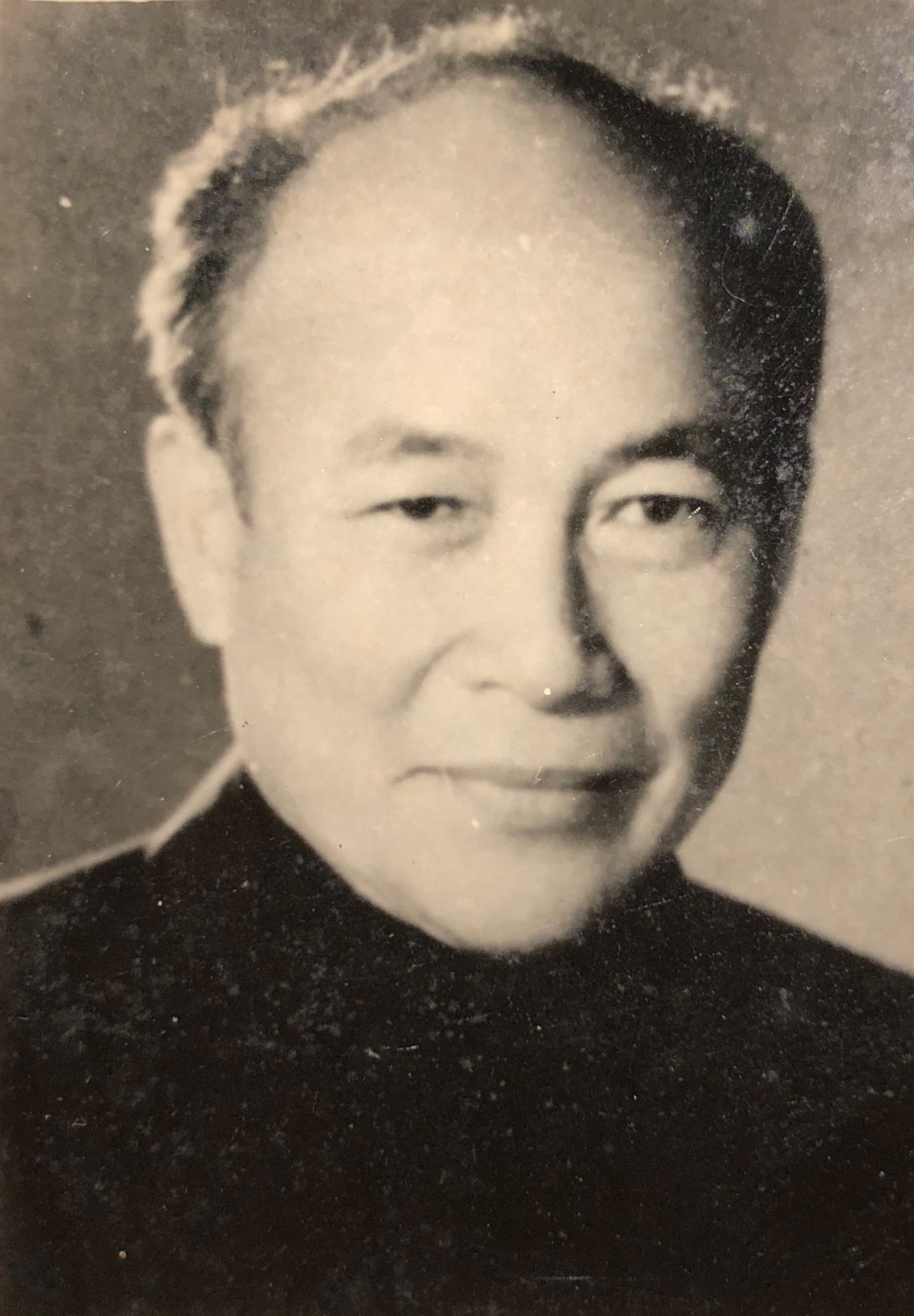
- Tô Hoài
- Born: Nguyễn Sen; September 27, 1920; Phủ Hoài Đức, Hà Đông, Nhà Nguyễn
- Died: July 6, 2014 (aged 93); Hà Nội, Việt Nam
- Occupation: Writer

Signature
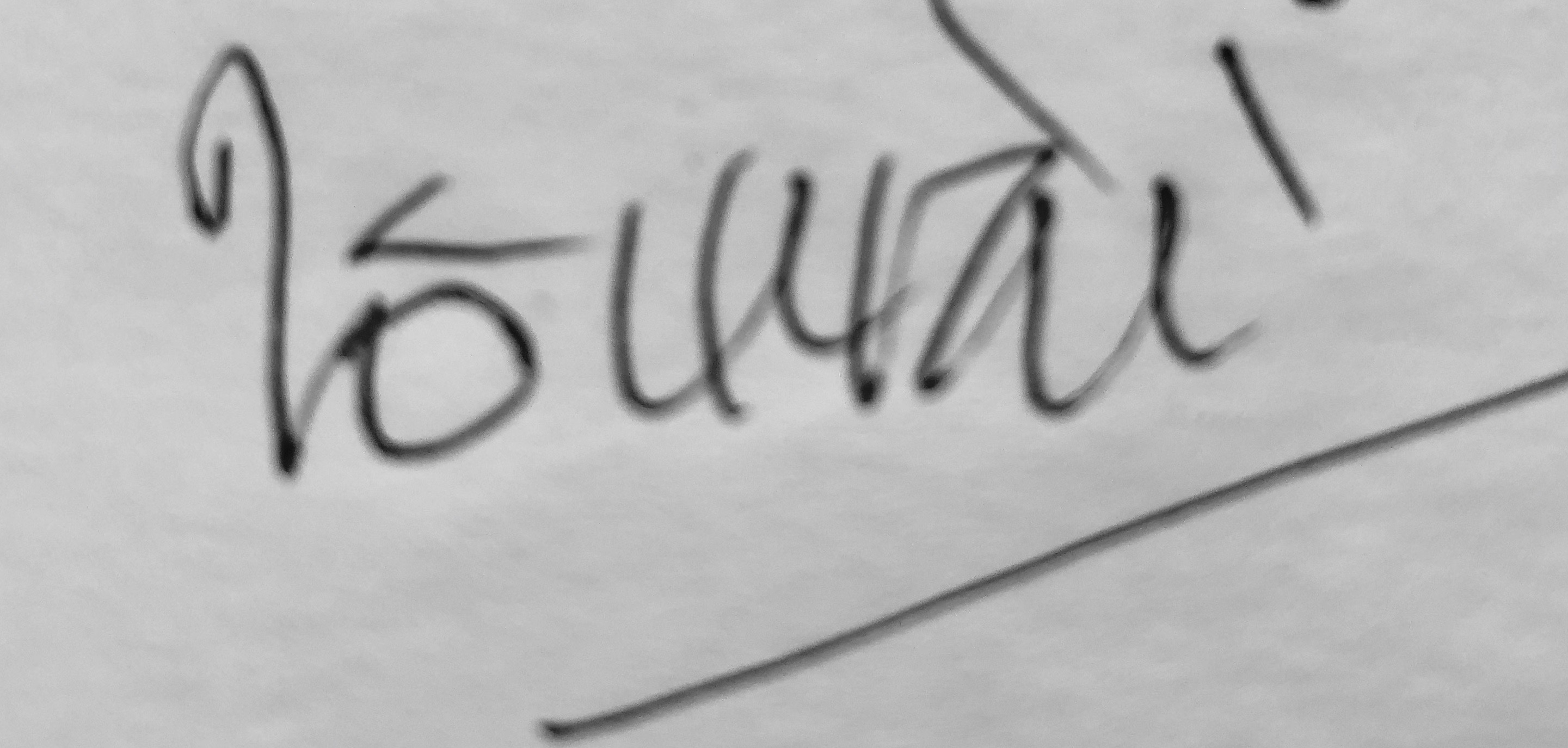

Tô Hoài (Birth name: Nguyễn Sen; September 27, 1920 – July 6, 2014) was a Vietnamese writer, playwright, screenwriter, journalist and correspondent.

The pen name Tô Hoài is derived from the names of Tô Lịch River and Hoài Đức district, which are landmarks of his hometown. Among his works are the best - seller books Dế mèn phiêu lưu ký (Diary of a cricket) (1941), Truyện Tây Bắc (Stories of North West region) (1958), Quê nhà (Home town) (1970), Ba người khác (Three Others) (1991). Some of his works have been translated into foreign languages. He won the Ho Chi Minh Prize for Literature in 1996.

== Biography ==
Tô Hoài was born in Nghĩa Đô ward, Cầu Giấy district, Hanoi, Vietnam. He was the only son of a craftsmen family who made their living by weaving. He was sent to primary school but no longer continued higher education because of his family poor financial conditions.

After leaving school, he worked various jobs including as a craftsman, a tutor, a salesman, and an accountant. Despite working in different fields, he continued to self-study until eventually becoming a well-respected writer in Vietnam.

His first literary work was issued in the Hà Nội Tân văn (Hanoi Newspaper) and Tiểu thuyết thứ bảy (Saturday Novel Newspaper) in the end of 1940. Since then he had written for many kind of genres: guides, journal, memoirs, short stories, poetry, anthologies, novels, autobiographies, film scripts, plays and many types of newspaper articles like feature articles, editorials, columns. He had written more than 150 works of which about half are for children. In among the most well - known book for children is also his best selling, Dế mèn phiêu lưu ký (Diary of a cricket) (1941) that has been translated in 37 languages and filmed. The book has been created for comics, cartoons and kept republished many times. For many years and until today one chapter of the book is continued to publish in textbook for elementary school students and to be taught nationwide.

Tô Hoài's works and books are mainly for five themes: 1. Children, 2. History and present of Hanoi's suburbs, 3. Mountainous areas in North West and Viet Bac revolutionary base, 4. Resistance and the formation of socialism, 5. Autobiographies, memoirs and guides on creative writing.

Besides Dế mèn phiêu lưu ký (Diary of a cricket) translated in different languages, Tô Hoài has other books and stories translated in English, Russian, Chinese, French, Japanese ... Some of them are Chuyện Trê Cóc (The story of the catfish and the toad), Tình buồn (A sad love story)

Later life and before death, he stopped writing books but continued to produce many articles published by many local newspapers in Vietnam. Tô Hoài died of old age at 93 years old on July 6, 2014, in Hanoi. The funeral service was held on July 17, 2014, by the states and attended by hundreds people including family members, high-rank leaders from the states, governments, Hanoi People Committee, associations, bodies ... and his beloved readers. His death was marked as the passing away of the last writer of the writers generation who became famous before the Revolution in 1945 in Vietnam.

== Period of resistance ==
During the Democracy Front period in 1938, Tô Hoài joined the Fraternity Weaver Movement as Acting Secretary for their Ha Dong province association as well as the Movement for Youth Against Imperialism. In 1943, he became a member of the first team of Culture for Nation Salvation in Hanoi. After the August Revolutionary in 1945, Tô Hoài participated in the Southward March Movement, leaving for Việt Bắc province to be a journalist for Cứu quốc newspaper (National Salvation). There, he worked as a head of Cứu quốc Việt Bắc newspaper (Viet Bac National Salvation and as an editor-in-chief for Cứu quốc magazine. He also joined the Vietnamese Arts & Literature Association in 1951.

After the restoration of peace in Vietnam, he was elected for General Secretary of the Association in the first congress in 1957. From 1958 to 1980, he was member of the executive committee and afterwards held the position of Vice General Secretary of the Vietnamese Writers Association.

From 1966 to 1996, he was also the first chairman of the Hanoi Arts Association, later known as Hanoi Arts & Literature Association. He is also the first president of the Children's Literature Council under Vietnam Writers Association.

Tô Hoài has been awarded many honorary positions. He was elected to be a Vietnamese National Assembly member for the seventh session, nominated to be Vice Chairman for the Fatherland Front of Hanoi City, Vice Chairman of the Asian-African-Latin American Solidarity Committee and Vice Chairman of the Vietnamese-Indian Friendship Association.

== Prizes and awards ==
- Truyện Tây Bắc (Stories of North West region): First Prize for Novel awarded by the Vietnam Arts and Literature Association, 1956
- Miền Tây (The West): First Prize awarded by the Asian-African Writers’ Association, 1970
- Quê nhà (Hometown): An award granted by Hanoi Arts Association, 1970
- Chuyện cũ Hà Nội (Old Stories about Hanoi): Thang Long Prize awarded by the Hanoi People's Committee
- Dế mèn phiêu lưu ký (Diary of a cricket), Xóm Giếng (Gieng village), Nhà nghèo (Poor family), O chuột (Hunting Mice), Núi Cứu quốc (National Salvation), Truyện Tây Bắc (Stories of North West region), Mười năm (10 years), Xuống làng (Go to downtown), Vỡ tỉnh (Province was down), Tào luồng (Tao luong), Họ Giàng ở Phìn Sa (Giang family in Phin Sa), Miền Tây (The West), Vợ chồng A Phủ (A Phu couple), Tuổi trẻ Hoàng Văn Thụ (Youth of Hoang Van Thu): Ho Chi Minh Prize for Literature (first time), 1996
- Bui Xuan Phai Prize – A love for Hanoi, 2010
