= Kim Đồng =

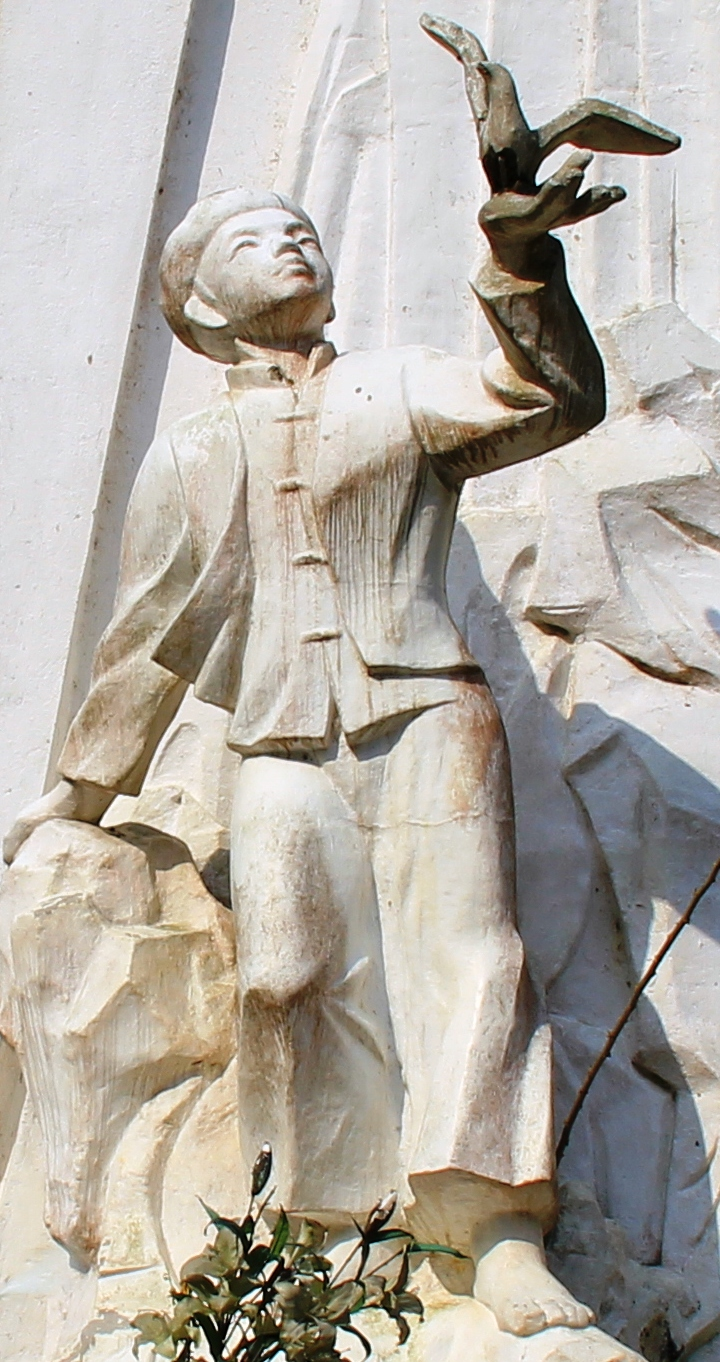
Kim Đồng statue

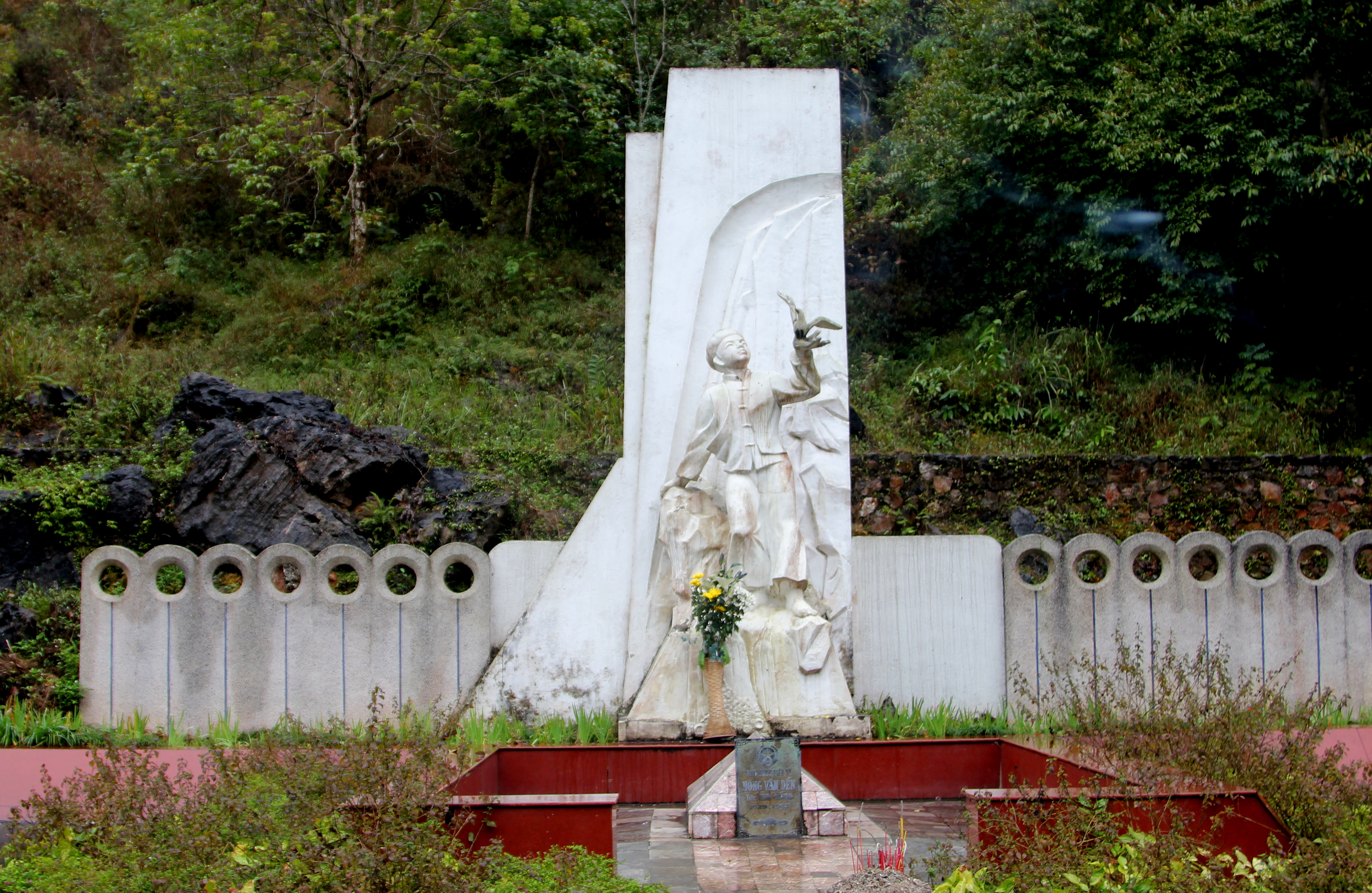
Kim Đồng tomb and monument

Kim Đồng is the alias of Nông Văn Dèn (1929–February 15, 1943). He was a Nung boy who fought with the Vietnamese resistance against the French.

== Biography ==
=== Family ===
Kim Đồng was born Nông Văn Dền in 1929 in Nà Mạ village. In Nùng language, "Dền" means money. When Dền was born, his parents must have expected him to have a good, fulfilling life and have a lot of money in the future. It is a wish when naming, but its main meaning is: This child is a beloved child, a precious child (like money).

Kim Đồng's father, from Na Ma village, was Nông Văn Ý. During a visit to his wife's hometown in Kép Ké village (Nà Sác), he died of unknown reason and his body was never found. Kim Đồng's mother's was Lân Thị Hò (1890–1972), a native of Kép Ké village. She was a hardworking woman, devoted to her husband and children, good at weaving and paper making, and was a member of the Women's National Salvation Association (Vietnamese: Hội Phụ Nữ Cứu Quốc). Her health was very weak, so since childhood, Kim Đồng had to do many things only mature individuals could do, which soon formed in Kim Đồng mature personalities such as: decisive, dynamic, not afraid of difficulties and brave.

Kim Đồng has two older sisters, an older brother and a youngest sister. The eldest sister's name is Nông Thị Nhằm. She married a man in the same village named Lý Văn Kinh, who was called Kinh Xình, Kinh Xình's house was the place to meet and protect revolutionary cadres. In this house, on February 14, 1943, the key leader of the Châu Party Committee Hà Quảng had a meeting. Thanks to Kim Đồng's brave actions, he helped them escape from the foreign troops to the mountain behind the house. His second older sister, Nông Thị Lằng, also married to a man in the same village. His older brother, Nông Văn Tằng (alias Phục Quốc) was a member of the liberation army, he joined the revolution early fought and died in Chợ Đồn (Bắc Kạn). In order for Phục Quốc to have conditions for revolutionary activities, at the age of 12, Kim Đồng replaced him as a woodcutter, cutting trees and planting grass at Sóc Giang fort. His youngest sister is Nông Thị Slấn (in Nùng language, Slấn means belief), a beautiful and hardworking girl. Once crossing a stream, she slipped and fell, drowning to her death.

=== Joining Ho Chi Minh Young Pioneer Organisation ===
In 1939, 10-year-old Nông Văn Dèn was already aiding the resistance by delivering secret letters to the local guerrillas, and helping revolutionary soldiers join hidden troops in remote parts of the mountainous province.

He was the first leader of the National Salvation Teenagers and Children's Team of in Nà Mạ village (Vietnamese: Đội Thiếu niên nhi đồng cứu quốc làng Nà Mạ), established on May 15, 1941. This is also the first children's team in the country. When establishing the National Salvation Teenagers and Children's Team, Đức Thanh, the youth secretary who was in charge of the team, gave each person revolutionary names (or alias). Nông Văn Dền, the leader was named Kim Đồng, Đồng refers to children (under 15 years old). Kim is gold, is new, is beautiful. In terms of semantics, Kim Đồng is a young, beautiful, bright teenager. The name Kim Đồng is taken from the tradition in Taoism (Laos). Kim Đồng (male) - Ngọc Nữ (female) are beautiful, intelligent, bright young men and women who follow the servants, serving the fairies (there may be a metaphor: Kim Đồng was met, served Tiên Ông (male fairy)- Uncle Hồ on Nục Én cave. Kim Đồng and other members were still young, but they all were very brave and courageous, always taking the lead in participating in revolutionary activities such as making contacts, transferring secret documents, and escorting revolutionary cadres, watching French spies and guarding secret meetings.

On one occasion, when Kim Đồng was carrying important documents, he was captured by troops acting on the side of the French, who demanded to know what he was carrying and who he had met on the road. He insisted that the only person he had seen was a local herb doctor who was travelling to a nearby village to give medicine to a woman having problems giving birth. The doctor was immediately sought for arrest. Kim Đồng followed the troops to the man with plans of staging an escape. As the troops led their captive through a market, Kim Đồng started agitating two buffaloes which began to tussle. Two of the guards were so engrossed in the fight that the youngster was able to lead their prisoner away to a secret cave, where they met a female resistance liaison.

== Death ==
Kim Đồng and his teammates did the task of communicating, escorting the Việt Minh and delivering secret letters. On February 15, 1943, French troops planned to round up to the guerrillas. Kim Đồng saw the French soldiers coming to the cadre's house, he diverted their attention to him so that his friends could help the officers withdraw safely. Kim Đồng ran across the stream, the French could not keep up so they opened fire on him. Kim Đồng got shot on the bank of Lenin stream (Cao Bằng) at 5am. He has just turned 14 years old. In the evening, Kim Đồng's friends and villagers took his body to be buried at Tèo Lài mountain.

On September 23, 1997, Nông Văn Dền (i.e. Kim Đồng) was posthumously awarded the title Hero of the People's Armed Forces.

== Kim Đồng's image in real life ==
Talking about Kim Đồng, he is the image of a Nùng teenager wearing indigo clothes, wearing an indigo beret on his head, carrying a fishing rod on his shoulder, holding a bird cage in one hand, and a small starling in it (or the little starling perched on his hand). Those are real items of Kim Đồng, but they are not just objects, but figuratively speaking, they are "props" for Kim Đồng to delivering secret letters.

Nà Mạ village has Lenin stream flowing through, there are many fish such as Liềng fish, Pất fish, Dầm xanh fish. Kim Đồng used to go fishing there and brought the fish home, but many times Kim Đồng has faked fishing. When he was on guard duty, Kim Đồng had already hooked a fish on the hook, then he released the hook. Sitting on the bank, Kim Đồng looked around, if he saw suspicious people and phenomena, Kim Đồng snatched the fish and shouted with joy to alert his comrades. Receiving his "signal", that information is quickly transmitted through the "line" of the National Salvation Children's Team members (the first name of Ho Chi Minh Young Pioneer Organization). The people in the meeting quickly destroyed documents, found a way to cope, or escaped to the forest. Kim Đồng's bamboo rod was "crafted" very well, at the base and top of the fishing rod were removable hollow bamboo sticks, to stuff secret letters, the birdcage also has places where letters can be hidden. These "props" were to make the suspects think that Kim Đồng is trapping birds, not thinking that he is on a mission delivering secret letters and documents. The birdcage and the small starling were also "props" for Kim Đồng to escape in unexpected dangerous situations: He opened the cage door for the starling to fly away and scolded the French soldiers so that his comrades could avoid. Kim Đồng's beret had two inner linings where letters and documents were sealed with high security.
