= List of newspapers in Vietnam =

This is a list of newspapers in Vietnam.

- Báo Ảnh Việt Nam
- Báo Biên phòng
- Báo điện tử Đảng Cộng sản Việt Nam
- Báo Tin tức
- Bất động sản Việt Nam
- Cảnh sát nhân dân
- Công lý
- Công nghiệp Quốc phòng và Kinh tế
- Công an nhân dân
- Công thương
- Đầu tư
- Người đưa tin Pháp luật
- Hải quân Việt Nam
- Hànộimới
- Lao Động
- Le Courrier du Vietnam
- Chính trị và Phát triển
- Đại biểu Nhân dân
- Người lao động
- Nhân Dân
- Pháp luật Việt Nam
- Phòng không – Không quân
- Quân đội nhân dân
- Quốc phòng Thủ đô
- Quốc phòng toàn dân
- Sài Gòn Giải Phóng
- Tạp chí Cộng sản
- Tạp chí Văn hiến Việt Nam
- Thanh Niên
- Thời báo Tài chính Việt Nam
- Thời đại
- Tiền Phong
- Tiếng nói Việt Nam
- Tuổi Trẻ
- Văn nghệ Quân đội
- Y học Quân sự

Below is a list of websites published in Vietnam in alphabetical order.

- 24h.com.vn
- Báo Mới
- Báo Điện tử Chính phủ nước Cộng hòa Xã hội chủ nghĩa Việt Nam
- DanTri
- Việt Báo
- VietNamNet
- Việt Nam News
- VnExpress
- Zing

== Online newspapers in English ==
=== State newspapers ===
Name	Publisher	Website
DTiNews (Dân Trí International)	Ministry of Home Affairs	https://dtinews.dantri.com.vn/
Government News	Government	https://en.baochinhphu.vn/
Public Security News	Ministry of Public Security	https://en.cand.com.vn/
The People's Deputies	National Assembly Office	https://en.daibieunhandan.vn/
The World and Vietnam Report	Ministry of Foreign Affairs	https://en.baoquocte.vn/
Việt Nam News	Vietnam News Agency	https://vietnamnews.vn/
Vietnam Agriculture and Nature	Ministry of Agriculture and Environment	https://van.nongnghiepmoitruong.vn/
Vietnam Economic News	Ministry of Industry and Trade	https://ven.congthuong.vn/
Vietnam Investment Review	Ministry of Finance	https://vir.com.vn/
Vietnam Law & Legal Forum	Vietnam News Agency	https://vietnamlawmagazine.vn/
Vietnam News Agency	Vietnam News Agency	https://news.vnanet.vn/en/
VietNamNet Global	Ministry of Ethnic and Religious Affairs	https://vietnamnet.vn/en
VietnamPlus	Vietnam News Agency	https://en.vietnamplus.vn/
VOV (Voice of Vietnam)	VOV (Voice of Vietnam)	https://english.vov.vn/en/
VTV Online	VTV (Vietnam Television)	https://english.vtv.vn/

=== Communist Party newspapers ===
Name	Publisher	Website
Communist Review	Central Committee of the Communist Party	https://en.tapchicongsan.org.vn/
Nhân Dân (lit. 'The People')	Central Committee of the Communist Party	https://en.nhandan.vn/

=== Military newspapers ===
Name	Publisher	Website
People's Army Newspaper	General Political Department of the People's Army	https://en.qdnd.vn/

=== Civil Society newspapers ===
Name	Publisher	Website
Enternews	Chamber of Commerce and Industry	https://en.diendandoanhnghiep.vn/
Lao Động (lit. 'Labour')	General Confederation of Labour	https://news.laodong.vn/
Tuổi Trẻ (lit. 'Youth')	Hồ Chí Minh Communist Youth Union of Ho Chi Minh City	https://news.tuoitre.vn/
Vietnam Times	Union of Friendship Organisations	https://vietnamtimes.thoidai.com.vn/

=== Provincial newspapers ===
Name	Publisher	Website
Hanoi Times	Hanoi Municipal People's Committee	https://hanoitimes.vn/
Sài Gòn Giải Phóng (lit. 'Liberated Saigon')	Ho Chi Minh City Municipal Party Committee of the Communist Party	https://en.sggp.org.vn/
Báo Hải Phòng	Hải Phòng Municipal Party Committee of the Communist Party	https://news.baohaiphong.vn/
Hải Phòng News	Hải Phòng Department of Foreign Affairs	https://haiphongnews.gov.vn/
Cần Thơ News	Cần Thơ Municipal Party Committee of the Communist Party	https://baocantho.com.vn/news/
Danang News	Dà Nẵng Municipal Party Committee of the Communist Party	https://en.baodanang.vn/
Huế Ngày Nay (lit. 'Huế Today')	Huế Municipal Party Committee of the Communist Party	https://news.huengaynay.vn/
Đồng Nai Online	Đồng Nai Provincial Party Committee of the Communist Party	https://baodongnai.com.vn/english/
Báo Ninh Bình	Ninh Bình Provincial Party Committee of the Communist Party	https://en.baoninhbinh.org.vn/
Báo Đồng Tháp	Đồng Tháp Provincial Party Committee of the Communist Party	https://baodongthap.vn/en
Báo Phú Thọ	Phú Thọ Provincial Party Committee of the Communist Party	https://en.baophutho.vn/
Báo Lâm Đồng	Lâm Đồng Provincial Party Committee of the Communist Party	https://en.baolamdong.vn/
Nghệ An Online Newspaper	Nghệ An Provincial Party Committee of the Communist Party	https://baonghean.vn/en/
Báo Bắc Ninh	Bắc Ninh Provincial Party Committee of the Communist Party	https://en.baobacninhtv.vn/
Gia Lai News	Gia Lai Provincial Party Committee of the Communist Party	https://en.baogialai.com.vn/
Báo Hưng Yên	Hưng Yên Provincial Party Committee of the Communist Party	https://news.baohungyen.vn/
Báo Khánh Hòa	Khánh Hòa Provincial Party Committee of the Communist Party	https://news.baokhanhhoa.vn/
Tuyên Quang Online	Tuyên Quang Provincial Party Committee of the Communist Party	https://en.baotuyenquang.com.vn/
Báo Thái Nguyên	Thái Nguyên Provincial Party Committee of the Communist Party	https://en.baothainguyen.vn/
Báo Lào Cai	Lào Cai Provincial Party Committee of the Communist Party	https://baolaocai.vn/lao-cai-news/
Quảng Ninh Online	Quảng Ninh Provincial Party Committee of the Communist Party	https://english.baoquangninh.vn/
Sơn La News	Sơn La Provincial Party Committee of the Communist Party	https://en.baosonla.org.vn/
Lạng Sơn News	Lạng Sơn Provincial Party Committee of the Communist Party	https://baolangson.vn/en
Điện Biên Phủ Online	Điện Biên Provincial Party Committee of the Communist Party	https://en.baodienbienphu.com.vn/

== See also ==
- Media of Vietnam
- List of newspapers
- List of non-English-language newspapers in New South Wales#Vietnamese
