= Mass media in Vietnam =

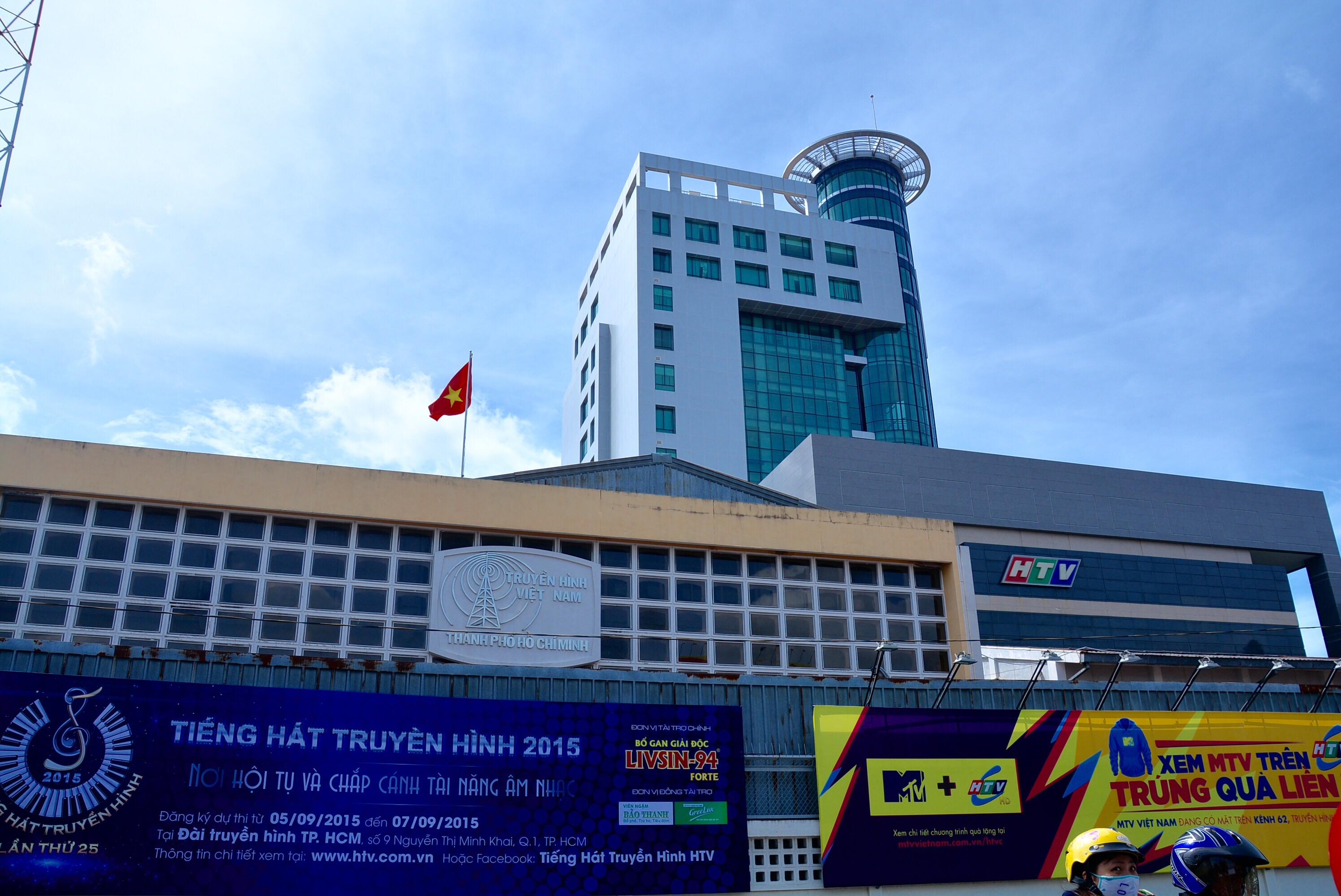
Ho Chi Minh City Radio and Television's building in 2015

Mass media in Vietnam began to appear in the mid-1960s in Saigon, then under control of South Vietnam, with the establishment of Saigon Television Station. In 1970, North Vietnam, the Voice of Vietnam broadcast the first experimental television program. Beginning from the late 1970s, color television was introduced and broadcast experimentally. Today, television in Vietnam is available in many broadcasting formats, with many national and local channels, broadcast or pay-per-view with more than 200 channels available to viewers. The country began switching off all analog signals in major cities beginning August 2016, in 21 provinces on 30 June 2020, and extended it nationwide on 28 December, shutting down all remaining analog broadcasts.

Mass media in Vietnam is considered a type of journalism, managed under the Press Law of the Ministry of Information and Communications of Vietnam, according to which the law does not allow private businesses to own television stations, but "is allowed to associate in journalistic activities with other press agencies, legal entities, and individuals with business registrations that are appropriate to the field of association", allowing private units to cooperate with broadcasters operated by the Government of Vietnam, creating the policy of television socialization.

Television is currently one of the largest mass media channels in Vietnam, as surveys show that 8 out of 10 people watch television daily. However, television is being challenged by new forms of media, witnessing a decline in revenues as well as a shift in audiences to services such as video on demand or social networks on the Internet.

== History ==
=== 1965–1975: The beginning of mass media in Vietnam ===
==== In the South ====
Television was first introduced in October 1959 in the Republic of Vietnam during an exhibition in Saigon. In this pilot program, the artists sat in the military microphone studio, and the audience watched through two screens located in the exhibition center from 19:30 to 20:30 every day. The weekly newspaper Cinema published in November 1959 said: "Once a television station is established, we believe that there will be a lot of people buying televisions so that they can keep up with the television broadcast programs."

In 1965, Saigon Television Station, the first television station of Vietnam, was officially established. On 22 January 1966, the first television program was broadcast, and then officially aired in the South on 7 February. The station broadcast black-and-white television with the FCC television technical standards alongside a 4.5 MHz voice modulation.

In the early days, due to the lack of television towers, broadcasting was done with stratovision. All programs, including news, would be recorded on magnetic tapes, and then transferred onto the four-engine Super Constellation aircraft. Every evening, this aircraft carrying equipment would leave the Tan Son Nhat Airport to a stable altitude of 3,150 metres at a location about 32 km southeast of Saigon, and from there flew on an unchanged, nightly repeating route at a steady speed of 271 km/h. Television signals from helicopters could then be received in places as far away from Saigon as Da Nang, Ca Mau or Phnom Penh, but only Saigon and the neighbouring provinces would have the clearest picture and sound quality.

Alongside the creation of Vietnam Television, the United States Army also established its own radio‑television system in South Vietnam, where U.S. forces were stationed at the time. This station was originally called AFRTS. In 1967, it changed the name to AFVN. Broadcasting in English on the 11th frequency band, it was meant to serve American soldiers working in the South at that time. After that, AFVN built a television tower at 9 Hong Thap Tu Street, which was also the station's headquarters. On 25 October 1966, Vietnam's first television tower was completed and put into use, replacing the previous broadcast by helicopter. The tower is 128 metres tall and is where the 25 kW Channel 9 broadcast antenna of THVN, Channel 11 and FM 99.9 MHz of AFVN are located.

In addition to the main station in Saigon, the Republic of Vietnam also had four local television stations in Huế, Quy Nhơn, Nha Trang and Cần Thơ.

In 1972, Dac Lo Television was established. This was a private television company belonging to Catholic Church of the Republic of Vietnam and operated by Jesuits. It did not have its own separate broadcast channel, but only produces educational programs to broadcast on THVN9, focusing on educational content and disseminating knowledge for the people, especially the poor. After the Fall of Saigon, all South Vietnamese radio and TV stations were replaced with broadcasts from North Vietnam.

==== In the North ====
While television broadcasting of the United States and the Saigon Government in the South was expanding rapidly, it had not yet appeared in the North. According to journalist Hoàng Tùng—former Editor-in-Chief of The People newspaper and Head of the Central Propaganda Department—President Ho Chi Minh frequently reminded officials to prepare the necessary conditions for developing a television industry. In the 1960s, whenever Hoàng Tùng traveled abroad for work, he made a point of watching television in other countries. Acting on President Ho Chi Minh's vision, the Vietnam Television Film Studio was established in January 1968 under the General Department of Information. Its mission was to produce 16‑millimetre television films for foreign broadcasters, mainly about the Vietnam War, while simultaneously laying the groundwork for a future national television industry.

That year, during an international reception, Ho Chi Minh asked cinematographer Phan The Hung: "When will you let our people watch television?" He emphasized that producing films to send abroad was not enough; what mattered was creating television broadcasts that the Vietnamese people themselves could see. The government even planned to allocate a plot of land near Chùa Bộc in Hanoi for the General Department of Information to build a television station, but the plan could not be realized at that time.

To prepare for the experimental television broadcast, a television preparation team was established with the requirements of building a minimum television technical infrastructure, including a studio with electronic cameras, television transmitters, antennas television receiver, etc. The Voice of Vietnam had sent a number of officials to Cuba and other Socialist countries to study about television broadcasting. Meanwhile, VOV initiated several television experiments with improved radio equipment, converting two radio transmitters into one video and one voice transmitter, and self-assembled two usabled super orthicon cameras from Moscow Television and named them as Heaven Horse. This name is derived from the name of the homemade gun, used by the Liberation Army of South Vietnam in combat. The two cameras, model numbers NT1 and NT2 respectively, could produce images despite some incomplete features.

On the evening of 7 September 1970, the first signals of VOV's television service were transmitted from VOV Studio headquarters: M at 58 Quán Sứ Street, Hanoi. In 1971, VOV established its television department Television Editorial Board, the predecessor of Vietnam Television. In the night of Lunar New Year's Day 1971, VOV broadcast its first experimental television program, serving the capital city of Hanoi. Since there is no storage device, all programs are broadcast live. By 1972, the broadcasting was interrupted due to multiple attacks from South Vietnam and the US, including Operation Linebacker II. VOV was forced to evacuate, and all television signals had been suspended until 1973, after the Paris Peace Accords was signed.

=== 1975–1990: Post-war period and the beginning of color television ===
In the South, after the Paris Peace Accords came into force, all AFVN stations officially ceased to operate and all machinery and equipment were handed over to THVN9. The THVN9 network expanded to cover the whole Republic of Vietnam. The station ceased its operations on the night of 29 April 1975, the day before the Fall of Saigon. After Saigon was captured, Voice of Vietnam and the Liberation Station A, together with Liberation Station B in the Southeast region took over the entire radio and television system left by the old regime. Saigon Television Station was renamed Liberation Television Station and began airing again on the evening of 1 May 1975. At the same time, Dac Lo Television became the second campus of the Liberation Television Station and resumed operation on 3 October 1975. Until 2 July 1976, Saigon was officially renamed as Ho Chi Minh City, Liberation Television Station was renamed to Ho Chi Minh City Radio and Television.

In the North, in 1976, the Television Center was built in Giang Vo, Hanoi, and from here, television began to be broadcast daily along with the construction of a television tower at Pole 1200 in Tam Dao. In 1977, the Television Editorial Board separated from the Voice of Vietnam, becoming the new Central Television Station and moved its headquarters to the new Center.

In 1976, HTV experimented with color broadcasting. Two years later, in September 1978, THTW also began a limited-time trial of SECAM-system color television for testing purposes, serving a limited number of its existing color television sets. audience at that time. To improve the team's level, THTW also sent a delegation of 8 engineers to practice color television at the Television of the German Democratic Republic for 1 1/2 years. In addition, the station also built the Tam Đảo Transmission Station to cover the whole North Vietnam region and support the construction of local television stations.

Although Vietnam used the French SECAM standard as its broadcasting standard, which was used in most socialist states, the broadcasting system in the North and the South was completely different: the North was using the SECAM/CCIR D system. At the same time, the South assumed control of the American system FCC/CCIR M. Therefore, to manage and unify the national broadcasting system, on 12 May 1977, the State established the Radio - Television Committee, an upgrade from Voice of Vietnam. In the organizational structure of the committee, there is the Institute for Research and Development of Radio - Television Broadcasting to study and solve the shortcomings in the unified mass media system, mainly in television. The institute is headquartered in the South to facilitate coordination with HTV, to solve the system transfer to unify the radio and television system nationwide.

As a regional station in the South of Vietnam under the Vietnam Radio - Television Commission, HTV has helped television stations in the southern provinces to restore facilities or build more.

With the help of THTW and HTV, a system of local television stations was gradually formed. In 1976, the Vinh Television Station was established, followed by the Đà Nẵng Television Station, established on the basis of Hai Van broadcasting station. In 1978, Thanh Hoá Television was officially broadcast, along with that, the Vinh Television was transferred to the local People's Committee, becoming Nghệ Tĩnh Television. In early 1979, the television program Hanoi Television began its broadcasts on the national television, initially as a program to serve the capital's citizens, broadcast monthly, then gradually moved to daily broadcasting. This is the forerunner of today's Hanoi Radio Television. In 1983, Haiphong Television and Quảng Ninh Television were officially established. In 1985, Dong Thap Television became the second television station in the Southwest region after Can Tho Radio - Television Station; however, it had to stop broadcasting in 1991 because of financial problems, and has only rebroadcast back since 1997; Lâm Đồng Radio - Television Station has become the first station in the Central Highlands to broadcast, and the second station in the South to have a color television broadcasting system.

During this period, the media was not fully developed. Every day, THTW and HTV would exchange video tapes via airway. In addition, THTW transmitted video tapes to Haiphong Television Station and neighboring provinces via road, and HTV transmitted video tapes to television stations in the South. This resulted in delays of several days in the broadcast of national television programs. Although the majority of programs at the time were produced by THTW or HTV, local stations also made efforts to insert a few locally oriented programs, primarily the local news, to complement the national broadcasts.

In the first half of the 1980s, color broadcasting by television stations began to take place. THTW officially switched to full-time color broadcasting in early August 1986, instead of just special programs. Meanwhile, HTV started broadcasting the HTV7 channel to facilitate the change of broadcasting systems. THTW was renamed to Vietnam Television on 30 April. On the night of 23 August, due to the lack of money to renovate the outdated electrical system, a destructive major fire broke out, burning down the entire television center of HTV. Yet, just one night later, HTV made the switch to color broadcasting, bringing an end to black-and-white television and setting a new milestone in Vietnam's broadcasting history.

Supported by the Soviet Government, in July 1980, the Lotus 1 Terrestrial Satellite Station along with a microwave line with a relay station in Phú Xuyên rural district has been completed to transmit signals to Hanoi Post Office in Hoàn Kiếm District and VTV located in Giang Vo. For the first time ever, the Giang Vo Television Center has directly recorded the color image of the programs in Moscow. The project was put into use on the occasion of the 25th anniversary of the signing of the Agreement on Economic, Scientific and Technical Cooperation and Trade between Vietnam and the Soviet Union and the opening ceremony of the 1980 Summer Olympics. Since then, international news from the Soviet Central Television has reached daily into Vietnam, and telecommunications and some images of Vietnam have finally reached the world.

Five years later, in 1985, the Soviet Union continued gifting Vietnam the Lotus 2 Satellite Station, located in Mac Dinh Chi Street, District 1, Ho Chi Minh City. With this, the satellite communication between Hanoi and Ho Chi Minh City was established, and television stations were fully capable of exchanging daily programs almost instantly, which created conditions for local television stations to be able to broadcast national television programs during the day. A few years later, major organizational changes were made: the Radio - Television Committee was dissolved; both VOV and VTV were transferred to the Ministry of Culture, Information and Tourism, now the Ministry of Culture, Sports and Tourism (Vietnam) for management; all broadcasting and transmission facilities of radio and television were transferred to the General Department of Posts and Telecommunications, under the management of the newly established Radio and Television Technical Department.

During this period, Vietnam was a member of OIRT (International Radio and Television Organization) - the broadcasting organization of socialist countries, led by the Soviet Union. Vietnamese television was required to use the SECAM color standard, the main system used in OIRT member countries, while most of the recorders and signal processing equipment at centers were using the PAL or multi-system, with the exception of some specialized Soviet cameras that used the SECAM system. At the time, the world's color television technology had 3 standards: NTSC, PAL, SECAM, of which the most prominent is the PAL system. Vietnamese television wanted to convert to the PAL system, but was not permitted to solve. After the dissolution of the Soviet Union, the OIRT also ceased to exist, television stations officially decided to switch to PAL color television broadcasting.

=== 1990–2007: Modernization, television expansion and the experimental transmit of digital television ===
On 30 January 1991, the Government of Vietnam issued Decision No. 26/CP assigning the General Department of Post and Telecommunications to lease Intesputnik satellite to transmit radio and television signals. Beginning Lunar New Year 1991, the official transmission began by the satellite coverage of the national television program for local stations to record and broadcast. Thanks to that, provincial and municipal local television stations have had a growth in quantity. In 1994, Vietnamese television first explored the UHF band when Sông Bé Radio - Television Station started its broadcast on channel 25 UHF on 2 September 1994, followed by the response and application of a series of other television stations. This success has opened a new path for the television industry in the country.

VTV2 and VTV3 were established and broadcast in the absence of frequency bands, the three VTV channels had to share a single channel frequency for a long time. VTV3 has been broadcasting on a separate satellite channel frequency starting from 31 March 1998, followed by VTV2 on 30 April 2001. Many local stations during this period mainly focused on relaying VTV2, because its coverage at that time was the weakest among the three main channels of VTV.

During this period, many old provinces began to separate to form new provinces and cities; because of that, new television stations has been appeared, such as Da Nang Television Station, Quang Nam, Ha Giang, Nam Dinh, Ninh Binh, Tra Vinh, Binh Duong.... In Central Vietnam, Phú Yên Television Station was established to address the television-signal dead for the people; Ninh Thuan Radio -Television Station was also separated from Thuan Hai Radio - Television Station.

Regarding television equipment, at the time, local TV stations often used Panasonic M video cameras using regular VHS tapes, and M9000 and Sony video cameras to film and broadcast programs. Regarding storage tapes, VTV and HTV used Ampex 2 Inch tapes to store broadcasts, and the remaining stations used Betacam/VHS tapes to broadcast. In 1999, HTV was the first station to perform automatic transfer of broadcast tapes. Regarding graphics editing equipment for rendering graphics through nonlinear junction detectors (NLJD), some major stations and local stations at that time already had NLJDs, such as VTV and HTV,... while smaller stations either made simpler graphics, or asked other stations or units to do it. Regarding transmitters, in the early 1990s, some local stations only broadcast with a capacity of less than 1 kW, later upgraded with foreign capital or support from major stations.

The final years of the 1990s saw three digital television broadcasting standards in the world: ATSC from the United States, DVB-T from Europe and DiBEG from Japan. Vietnamese television faced the challenge of choosing between these three standards. After a series of trials, the Science Council of Vietnam Television unanimously agreed to recommend the leadership of the station to adopt a terrestrial digital television standard for Vietnam. At noon on 26 March 2001, Mr. Hồ Anh Dũng, then General Director of Vietnam Television, officially signed the decision to adopt the digital terrestrial television standard DVB-T.

From early January 2002, Bình Dương Radio - Television Station began broadcasting its terrestrial digital television system on two channels, 50 and 53 UHF with 16 television channels. Soon after, VTC launched its service with 16 channels, followed by HTV's service that was only experimental.

In 2003, VTV began broadcasting its two channels VTV1 and VTV3 under the DVB-T standard. During the same period, BTV officially launched 24/7 broadcasting of its channel BTV3 on digital at channel 50 UHF, creating the premise for television stations to adopt 24/7 broadcasting in the future.

In 2004, VCTV inaugurated its direct-to-home (DTH) satellite digital television service and subsequently provided broadband Internet services through its DTH and Cable TV network the following year. That same year, VTC Digital Television was established and began to deploy digital television nationwide under the DVB-T standard.

In the same year, Teletext - a solution for transmitting text-based information via television channels - was introduced into Vietnam through Đồng Nai Radio - Television Station and Vietnamese Technology Joint Stock Company. This technology enabled viewers to access various essential information, such as news updates and market prices, continuously displayed on the screen without relying on the station's broadcast schedule. Subsequently, in 2009, Thái Nguyên Radio and Television Station also conducted trials of this technology in partnership with Hanel Company. However, to date, Teletext has seen no further development or expansion in Vietnam.

=== 2008–present: The rise of digital television and digital television transition ===
In 2008, High-definition television (HDTV) was first used in Vietnam, marking a significant advancement in broadcasting technology. HTVC became a pioneer in this transition by introducing HD broadcasts for channels such as HTV7, HTV9, and FBNC on its cable television system. Afterwards, SCTV and VTC also adopted HD television alongside launching satellite broadcasting.

In June 2009, Vietnam Satellite Digital Television Company Limited was officially established as a joint venture between the Cable Television Technical Center of VTV and Canal+ Overseas. On 12 January 2010, the company launched its satellite television service, K+.

On 11 November 2011, An Viên Television officially launched nationwide digital terrestrial television broadcasts using the DVB-T2 standard. On 27 December, Prime Minister Nguyễn Tấn Dũng issued Decision No. 2451/QĐ-TTg, approving the project of digital television transition by 2020. This initiative aimed to transition analog terrestrial broadcasting to digital DVB-T2, with the objective of ensuring that by 2020, all households in Vietnam would have access to digital television.

In 2013, VTV began trial broadcasts of digital television in several major cities using the DVB-T2 standard, before officially launching digital transmissions in 2014.

The government's Television Digitalization Project was implemented in 2015, starting with the complete shutdown of analog television broadcasts in Da Nang and the northern part of Quang Nam. Other regions gradually phased out analog broadcasts in subsequent years. By midnight on 28 December 2020, the final 15 provinces in the digitalization roadmap had ceased analog transmissions, marking the full completion of Vietnam's transition to digital terrestrial television.

Since September 2016, SCTV has conducted a test of ultra-high definition television 4K on the existing cable television system, for the first time in Vietnam. A year later, VTC also started broadcasting programs in 4K for free on the DVB-T2 system in some provinces and cities. Since 2016, a number of regional TV channels have simultaneously announced HDTV broadcasting.

== Mass media in Vietnam ==
=== Radio ===

The first Vietnamese-language radio transmission took place on 2 September 1945, when President Hồ Chí Minh delivered the declaration of independence of the Democratic Republic of Vietnam.

Prior to 1945, Vietnamese citizens were prohibited from owning radio receivers. Broadcasting activities were controlled by the French colonial administration, which had established Vietnam's first radio station, Radio Saigon, in the late 1920s.

Vietnam's national radio service, now known as the Voice of Vietnam, began broadcasting from Hanoi just one week after the declaration of independence. During the Vietnam War, Radio Hanoi served as a key propaganda channel for the Democratic Republic of Vietnam.

South Vietnam set up its own network in Saigon in 1955.

In 1955, South Vietnam established its own radio network based in Saigon. Following the country's reunification in 1975, all regional radio services were consolidated under the Voice of Vietnam, which officially became the national radio broadcaster in 1978.

Today, VOV offers a wide range of content across various platforms, encompassing news, culture, music, and educational programming. Its broadcasts are transmitted nationwide and internationally via AM and FM broadcasting. VOV operates several specialized channels, including:

- VOV1 – News and current affairs
- VOV2 – Cultural and social programs
- VOV3 – Music and entertainment
- VOV4 – Specialized for ethnic minorities
- VOV5 – International service, broadcasting in 11 foreign languages
- VOV6 – Artistic and literary content (Note: Currently a programming block on VOV2.)
- VOV Transportation – Traffic updates during rush hours, with general talk shows and music at other times
- VOV English 24/7 – English-language programming
- VOV Health – Health and safety content, with music programming outside key hours
- VOV News – An online news portal covering current events and social developments
- VOVTV – A national television channel focusing on cultural and tourism-related programming (Note: Defunction alongside VTC channels since 15 January 2025.)
- The Voice of Vietnam – A print edition offering in-depth coverage and analysis, complementing the VOV News website

As of 2004, it was estimated that VOV's broadcasts reached over 90% of households across Vietnam.

In addition to national programming, most provinces and major cities operate their own local radio stations.

=== Newspapers and periodicals ===
Colonial period

In the early 20th century, a combination of French colonial policies and technological advancements contributed to the rapid development of modern print culture in Vietnam's urban centers. This period witnessed a surge in the publication of new periodicals, journals, and newspapers. Between 1922 and 1940, Vietnamese publishers produced 13,381 different books and tracts, while from 1918 to 1939, at least 163 Vietnamese-language periodicals were in circulation in Saigon.

Notable publications of the era included Southern Wind, Phong Hoá, and Ngày Nay, which played a pivotal role in cultivating a vibrant public sphere. These outlets significantly influenced political discourse and intellectual life in urban Vietnam, where major debates centered on themes such as tradition versus modernity, anti-colonial resistance, and the emergence of nationalist consciousness.

The first Vietnamese-language newspaper, Gia Định Báo, was established in Saigon in 1869 under French sponsorship. In the following decades, newspapers became powerful instruments of propaganda for both colonial authorities and nationalist movements. During the final years of French colonial rule, numerous journalists were arrested, and several newspaper offices were shut down by the colonial administration in an attempt to suppress dissents.

Indochina War

On the revolutionary side led by Hồ Chí Minh, Vietnamese journalists actively reported on the First Indochina War. Following the war, printing presses were established in Hanoi, laying the foundation for the modern Vietnamese newspaper industry. In 1951, Nhân Dân, the official newspaper of the Communist Party, was launched and has since served as its central media organ.

Since 1975

As Vietnam transitioned toward a market-oriented economy through a series of economic reforms, the government increasingly relied on the print media to disseminate information and promote its policies to the public. This strategy contributed to a significant expansion of the media landscape, with the number of newspapers and magazines nearly doubling since 1996.

Major Vietnamese-language newspapers today include Tuổi Trẻ, published in Ho Chi Minh City and often characterized as reformist in tone; Thanh Niên, Lao Động, Tiền Phong, Sài Gòn Giải Phóng, and Hà Nội Mới. In the French-language press, Saigon Éco was once prominent, though today Le Courrier du Vietnam remains the only French-language newspaper currently in publication. Additionally, smaller provincial newspapers, such as the Bà Rịa–Vũng Tàu Daily News, contribute to local journalism.

In the digital media space, Vietnam's leading online newspapers include Zing.vn, VnExpress, VietNamNet, Tuổi Trẻ, Thanh Niên, Dân Trí, VTC News, and VietnamPlus. The country's largest online news aggregator is Báo Mới.

== Television broadcast transmission methods ==
=== Analog television ===
Analog television has appeared in Vietnam since the 1960s. In Vietnam, analog television broadcasts on the VHF band, and on the UHF band. Only a few places use frequencies below 6 VHF. Around the early 1990s, a number of television stations in the South began broadcasting on the UHF band, typically Radio - Television Station Song Be pioneered the use of the first UHF band with frequencies E25 and E44 UHF. Most analog terrestrial televisions in Vietnam use the D/K system.

Terrestrial analog television is no longer broadcast in Vietnam since 28 December 2020.

=== Digital television ===
==== DVB-T ====
In Vietnam, Vietnam Television Technology Development and Investment Company started broadcasting DVB-T terrestrial digital television in 2001. This is the first unit of Vietnam to broadcast television. Digital terrestrial television, creating a premise for the Government's Project on Digitalization of terrestrial television transmission and broadcasting until 2020.

In February 2002, Binh Duong Radio - Television Station began broadcasting DVB-T digital television in the South, on channels 50 and 53 UHF.

In early September 2003, HTV tested DVB-T on channel 30 UHF, broadcasting HTV7, HTV9 and some other channels. Not long after that, on 1 October 2003, this channel officially aired and channels HTV1, HTV2, HTV3, HTV4 were born at the same time. In December 2003, on the eve of the opening of the 2003 Southeast Asian Games, the Ho Chi Minh City Television Station began broadcasting DVB-T terrestrial digital television on the channel. 39, then channel 25, and stopped broadcasting on 31 December 2011.

In 2005, VTC was licensed by the State to broadcast DVB-T digital television nationwide.

In 2008, BTV's channel 50 UHF went down, and the station continued to broadcast channel 53 UHF.

On 31 December 2012, after 10 years of broadcasting, Binh Duong Radio - Television Station stopped broadcasting DVB-T digital television.

According to the Government's TV Digitization project, by the end of 2020, Vietnam would have completed television digitization and switch to terrestrial digital television broadcasting according to DVB-T2 standard. Currently, all digital terrestrial television transmission units have switched to broadcasting according to the DVB-T2 standard.

==== DVB-T2 ====
In Vietnam, An Vien Television started providing terrestrial digital television services with DVB-T2 broadcasting standard in 2011. This is the first transmission unit of the country broadcasting. terrestrial digital television according to the DVB-T2 standard.

In 2013, Vietnam Television experimented with broadcasting digital terrestrial television DVB-T2 in Hanoi, and officially broadcast in 2014. The current DVB-T2 television technology is being used to broadcast television on the UHF band nationwide, with the participation of transmission units: VTV, SDTV, VTC, AVG and DTV, on frequencies from 21 to 48 UHF.

Frequency table of channels on DVB-T2 system in Vietnam
Frequency channel	Broadcasting unit
23	VTV
24	VTV
25	VTV
26	VTV
27	VTV
29	VTC
30	VTC
31	VTC
33	SDTV
34	SDTV DTV
35	SDTV
36	SDTV
42	AVG
43	AVG
44	AVG
45	AVG
46	DTV
47	DTV
48	DTV

===== DVB-T2 frequency in local =====
From 2017, to make it easier for people to receive DVB-T2 waves, transmission units often change the channel frequency of stations to the correct channel frequency as prescribed by the Frequency Department and of the main station, called the network. single frequency. There is also a multi-frequency network. In addition, VTV has applied Dolby Digital Plus technology to channels broadcast on DVB-T2 since 2016.

==== T-DMB ====
In 2009, VTV tested Mobile TV in Hanoi, completing the procedure for licensing T-DMB mobile digital television broadcast nationwide. By 2018, Southern Digital Television Company also started testing mobile digital television in the South.

=== Satellite TV ===
The concept of satellite television first appeared in Vietnam during the early 1990s, when some agencies and units of Ho Chi Minh City started using satellite television. Very new types of television antennas appeared for the first time on city rooftops, called TVRO.

In the early 2000s, people in areas with low waves, unable to watch analog television, used satellite television to monitor Vietnamese TV channels. However, the State cannot control the content of satellite channels, and this leads to people watching programs with 'inappropriate' content. To solve this problem, on 15 October 2004, Vietnam Cable Television Technical Center started providing Digital Satellite Television service, covering the entire territory of Vietnam. However, due to the high cost of renting Malaysia's Measat 2 satellite, while lacking a satellite transponder, the number of channels on DTH is not much.

After the satellite Vinasat-1 was successfully launched in 2008, HTV was the first unit to sign a contract to lease channels and broadcast broadcasts of Vietnam's channels. and many other local TV channels. Viewers can easily receive and watch many TV channels for free at the same time with higher quality instead of using analog terrestrial television with a limited number of channels and poor quality. At the end of 2008, VTC Multimedia Corporation launched the satellite high-definition digital television service, broadcast on Vinasat satellite. 1, using the DVB-S2 standard, with many high-definition programs.

From May 2009, VCTV made the conversion from Measat 2 satellite to Vinasat 1 satellite, and completed the conversion on 1 July 2009.

On 12 June 2009, Vietnam Cable Television Technical Center, together with Canal+ Group announced the establishment of a joint venture corporation Vietnam Satellite Digital Television Company Limited. On 12 January 2010, VSTV announced a new brand name for its satellite digital television service, K+.

In 2011, Global Audiovisual Joint Stock Company provided An Vien Television service to all provinces and cities nationwide, through the satellite digital television service DVB-S2, broadcast waves on the NSS6 satellite. By 2015, AVG switched broadcasting to Vinasat 2 satellite.

On 5 December 2014, Vietnam Cable Television Corporation officially withdrew from VSTV joint venture, transferring the investor rights to Vietnam Television. The capital ratio in the VSTV joint venture remains unchanged, of which VTV continues to hold 51% and Canal+ is 49%.

=== Cable television ===
Cable television began to appear in Vietnam in 1992, when Saigontourist Cable Television Company Limited was born. This is the first cable television company in Vietnam, a joint venture between Vietnam Television and Saigon Tourism Corporation under the People's Committee of Ho Chi Minh City.

On 20 September 1995, Vietnam Television established the MMDS Cable Technical Service Center. The center was established on the basis of being separated from the Program Production Technical Center, with the main function and task of developing the multi-channel microwave television system MMDS, becoming a multi-channel pay TV system. second in Vietnam. In 2000, the center was renamed to Vietnam Cable Television Company. On 17 February 2003, Vietnam Cable Television Technical Service Center was established, the company served as the basis of VCTV. On 21 November 2003, it changed its name to Vietnam Cable Television Technical Center, opened more internet access services along with other value-added services. On 7 May 2013, Vietnam Cable Television changed its brand name to Vietnam Cable Television Corporation.

=== Internet protocol television ===
On 11 December 2007, FPT Telecom Joint Stock Company (FPT Telecom) of FPT Corporation launched the service IPTV first in Vietnam with the name "iTV".

In the present, in Vietnam, there are 3 largest IPTV service units in Vietnam. These are MyTV, Viettel TV and FPT Play.

==== OTT ====
In 2013, in the face of the changing trend of technology, especially in the field of OTT television, stations had a big experiment with OTT television service. VCTV is the first unit to officially provide OTT television services under the VTV Plus brand since January 2013, through the cooperation between VCTV and Joint Stock Company. Network Communications and Services. This application allows viewing multi-channel live TV, separate with playback feature and especially a completely new experience with interactive TV.

Along with that, Internet companies also jumped into this field, pioneering FPT Telecom with an online TV viewing application for handheld devices called FPT Play. The birth of FPT Play marked the opening of the OTT television service - Internet television in Vietnam.

On 1 November 2014, the Prime Minister signed Decision No. 1984 approving the project to create conditions for overseas Vietnamese to listen to and watch radio and television channels through various methods: on TVs, computers, phones, tablets and other mobile devices, thereby creating an opportunity for OTT television to take a bigger step in the next phase.

2016 has witnessed a strong explosion of OTT television service in Vietnam. While pay TV services in general are showing signs of decline, OTT television has a rapid growth rate. According to the data of the Ministry of Information & Communications, at the end of 2017 OTT television had only 720,000 subscribers, but by the end of 2019 it had jumped to the number of subscribers. number of 2.5 million subscribers.

OTT television in Vietnam currently has 4 participating groups:

1. Television content production units switching to OTT, taking the Internet as a transmission platform,
2. Units that take content from broadcasters or produce their own content for television,
3. Pure content production units have strengths in entertainment programs and want to build their own applications.
4. Platform service providers.

=== TV channels ===
==== Essential television channels ====
The following table is a list of television program channels that serve Vietnam's essential political and propaganda tasks, designated by the Ministry of Information and Communications. These TV channels are operated directly/indirectly by the government in order to deliver news, information, and propaganda supporting the state's interests.

Channel	Owner	Content	First broadcast	Year selected	Defunct
VTV1	Vietnam Television	News - Politics - Generalist	1970	2012	
VTC1	VTC Digital Television	News - Politics - Generalist	2004	2012	2025
ANTV	Ministry of Public Security	Security - Order	2011	2012	
VNews	Vietnam News Agency	News - Politics - Generalist	2010	2012	2025
National Assembly Television	National Assembly (Vietnam)	News - Politics - Generalist	2015	2016	2025
People TV	People's Newspaper	News - Politics - Generalist	2015	2016	2025
QPVN	Ministry of National Defence, Viettel Media	Military - Defense	2013	2016	

=== High-definition television ===
Currently in Vietnam, all TV stations broadcast in HD in 16:9 image format. Some TV channels have broadcast HD for at least one floor or more.

== Most viewed channels ==
Position	Channel	Share of total viewing (%)
1	VTV3	35.1
2	VTV1	15.5
3	HTV7	20
4	HanoiTV	12.1
5	THVL	6.0
6	VTC1	5.4
7	SCTV	2.6
8	ANTV	2.0
9	VNews	1.8

== See also ==
- Censorship in Vietnam
- Communications in Vietnam
- Culture of Vietnam
- Television in Vietnam
- Vietnam Television
