= Việt Báo (Vietnam) =

Online newspaper in Hanoi, Vietnam

Việt Báo is an online newspaper published in Hanoi by the Vietnam Ministry of Information and Communications Center for Press and International Communication Cooperation.

== History ==
Việt Báo was founded by the Bình Hoàng Trading and Service Joint Stock Company (Vietnamese: Công ty cổ phần Thương mại Dịch vụ Bình Hoàng) in Ho Chi Minh City before moving to Hanoi. In 2008, Sài Gòn Giải Phóng accused Việt Báo of republishing tens of thousands of articles from Sài Gòn Giải Phóng, Lao Động, Thanh Niên, Tuổi Trẻ, and Tiền phong without permission. In June 2008, the Ministry of Information and Communications Bureau of Press ruled that the site had violated the Press Law for posting information without authorization. The following month, the bureau forced the site to cease operations, fined its owner 25 million VND, and proposed that the Vietnam Internet Network Information Center revoke its vietbao.vn domain name. However, Việt Báo resumed operations shortly after under a different owner, continuing to republish other sites' content. In March 2013, Petrotimes accused Việt Báo of republishing not only its articles but also its advertisements.
