= Việt Nam News and Law =

Vietnamese English-language newspaper

- Type: Daily newspaper
- Owner: Asia News Network
- Publisher: Vietnam News Agency
- Editor-in-chief: Nguyen Minh
- Deputy editor: Do Le Ngoc Bich; Nguyen Khanh Chi
- Founded: 17 June 1991
- Language: English
- Headquarters: Hanoi; Ho Chi Minh
- Country: Vietnam
- Website: https://vietnamnews.vn/

Việt Nam News and Law (VNS) (formerly Việt Nam News) is a Vietnamese English-language daily print newspaper with offices in Hanoi and Ho Chi Minh and is published by the Vietnam News Agency, the news service of the Government of Vietnam. The newspaper was first published on 17 June 1991. It is one of the main English-language newspapers in Vietnam, and its current editor-in-chief is Nguyen Minh.

The paper is a member of the Asia News Network.

== See also ==
- Media of Vietnam
- Saigon Times
