= Việt Báo =

Việt Báo may refer to:

- Việt Báo (Canada), a weekly newspaper in Montreal
- Việt Báo Daily News, a daily newspaper in Garden Grove, California
- Việt Báo (Vietnam), an online newspaper in Vietnam
- Hoa Thịnh Đốn Việt Báo, a weekly newspaper in Annandale, Virginia
