= Unerasable! =

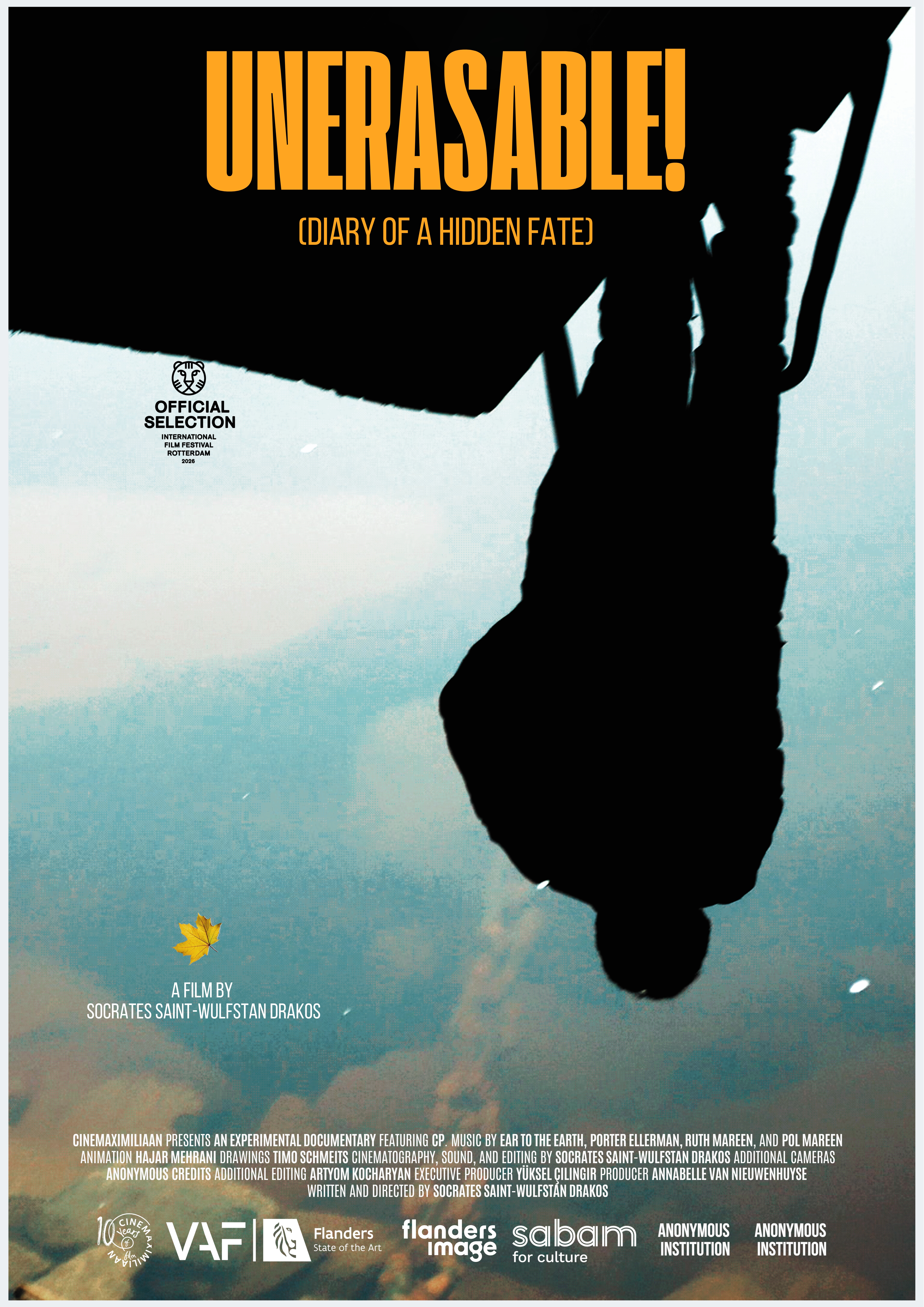
- Poster of the film
- Directed by: Socrates S.W. Drakos
- Written by: Socrates S.W. Drakos
- Produced by: Yüksel Çilingir; Annabelle Van Nieuwenhuyse
- Starring: C.P.
- Cinematography: Socrates S.W. Drakos
- Edited by: Socrates S.W. Drakos; Artyom Kocharyan
- Music by: Ear To The Earth; Porter Ellerman; Ruth Mareen; Pol Mareen
- Animation by: Hajar Mehrani
- Production company: Cinemaximiliaan
- Distributed by: Socrates S.W. Drakos
- Release date: 4 February 2026 (IFFR)
- Running time: 97 minutes
- Countries: Belgium; Thailand; Sweden
- Language: Vietnamese

Unerasable! (Diary of a Hidden Fate) is a 2026 Belgian experimental documentary film, directed by Socrates Saint-Wulstan Drakos and produced by Cinemaximiliaan. Running 97 minutes, the film talks about censorship, repression and state violence in Vietnam and exile in Europe. At the same time, the movie also talks about the legacy of French colonialism in Vietnam. It had its world premiere inside Tiger Competition section at the 55th International Film Festival Rotterdam.

== Plot ==
A Vietnamese independent filmmaker was forced to flee his homeland after being tortured for his participation in the 2018 Vietnam protests. He fled to Thailand and lived there for 5 years, undocumented, before moving again to Europe, where he continued to face displacement and precarity. The story follows his memory since he started filmmaking until his involvement into pro-democracy movement, gets tortured before he escaped the country. The film portrays two storylines in parallel: the life in displacement of the protagonist in Thailand and then in Europe vs. the past recounted memories of the protagonist in Vietnam.

The film is made in collage-style diary. Interwoven with fragments from colonial archives, European avant-garde films, Soviet propaganda, Cold War cinema, and Vietnamese state-produced films, the work uncovers the enduring patterns of structural violence that cut across authoritarian and contested histories, showing how political oppression inscribes itself on a single human life. By employing recycled cinema, this film tries to reimagine the medium itself as a metaphorical site of exile — a fragile space for survival, memory, and resistance.

== Production ==
Socrates Saint-Wulfstan Drakos is not the creator's real name. It is a pseudonym that the director chooses to be able to make this "politically outspoken work, one that confronts both the limits of civil liberties in an authoritarian Southeast Asian regime and the inner colonialism of a very neoliberal European country". The filmmaker knew about the situation of the protagonist since long time before the principal photography. The movie is produced by Cinemaximiliaan, a Brussels-based collective working with newcomers, refugees, and migrants through cinema and artistic collaboration. The producers are Yüksel Çilingir and Annabelle Van Nieuwenhuyse.

The film was shot in Thailand, Sweden and Vietnam, the home country of the main protagonist, through many times of going back and forth for the shooting fieldtrips. Besides observational footage of the life in displacement and in exile of the main protagonist, the movie also incorporates recycled footage from history of cinema. It interweaves with fragments from colonial archives, European avant-garde films, Soviet propaganda, Cold War cinema, and Vietnamese state-produced films. All of those fragments are related to the theme of the film – structural violence and the representation of violence in cinema through different epochs. The movie is narrated as a diary, basing on the testimony of the main protagonist.

The film received funding from Flanders Audio-visual Funds, VAF (Belgium). Part of the music fund is from SABAM, the Belgian Association of Authors, Composers and Publishers. Meanwhile, two anonymous research institutions of Belgium are cited to be among the main funders and supporters during the production of the project.

The music was made by Ruth Mareen and Porter Ellerman, two members of Belgian music ensemble - Ear To The Earth - and by Pol Mareen. Meanwhile, the animation part is made by Iranian artist/filmmaker Hajar Mehrani. Illustration drawings are made by Timo Schmeits.

== Release ==
Unerasable! had its world premiere at the 55th International Film Festival Rotterdam, inside the prestigious section of Tiger Competition on February 4, 2026.

The film was shown inside Belgian Competition section at Millenium Documentary Film Festival, in Brussels on April 2, 2026.

== Receptions ==
Unerasable! is considered as one of the very first films that talk about repression and censorship in Vietnam. The film is generally well-received by critics. Davide Abbatescianni from Cineuropa praises the film as a work of essay filmmaking that wears its urgency on its sleeve, while steadily drawing the viewer into a deeply personal odyssey. He also writes that the film is politically incisive, formally daring, unexpectedly laced with a few dry, fleeting moments of humour, and deeply humane. Regarding the form, he writes "the essayistic structure allows for digressions, hesitations and returns, mirroring the instability of a life lived under constant threat. Rather than offering a linear account of persecution and escape, the film builds an emotional and political landscape in which fear, anger, hope and exhaustion coexist".

Filmkrant, a Dutch magazine praises the film has strongest content inside Tiger Competition section for feature length movie. Ilmanifesto, an Italian newspaper, praised the film as a work to decolonize the imagination. Vertentesdocinema compares this work as "the tear in the seam". It also portrays the film as a kind of cinema that accumulates noises, internally and externally. RephraseMag writes the film is a video essay about memory and repression.

After the world premiere of the film inside IFFR Rotterdam 2026, on stage during the Q&A, the main actor told the audience that he cried three times while watching the film, and also cried on stage when he said those words.
