= Cho Taeil =

South Korean poet (1941–1999)

Cho Taeil (1941–1999) was a Korean poet. He was one of the poets who actively engaged in social matters during the Yushin era, and led the Minjung group of poets in the 1970s along with Shin Kyeongrim and Kim Jiha. He launched a poetry magazine, Siin (시인 Poet) and played a leading role in establishing the Council of Writers for Freedom and Practice.

== Life ==
He was born in 1941 in Gokseong, Jeollanam-do Province. In 1959 when he was admitted to Gwangju High School, he learned about poetry from Kim Hyeonseung, a poet, and studied literature with Lee Seongbu and Mun Suntae. In 1962, “Dasi podoeseo (다시 포도에서 From Grapes Again)” was chosen by Jeonnam Ilbo. In 1963, he was admitted to Kyunghee University with Lee Seongbu, majoring in Korean literature. When he was a sophomore in 1964, he received attention due to his poem “Achim seonbak (아침 선박 Morning Vessel)” being chosen by Kyunghyang Shinmun. He participated in a literary coterie, “Sinchunsi” with Lee Seongbu and Shin Sehun. He established the monthly poetry magazine, Siin, in 1969 to produce talented poets such as Kim Jiha and Kim Juntae.

=== 1970-1980 ===
He became renowned for his participation in social issues after he published a poetry collection, Sikkalron (식칼론 Theory of Kitchen Knife) in 1970. He established the Council of Writers for Freedom and Practice in 1974 together with Lee Seongbu, Ko Un, Baek Nakcheong, Shin Kyeongrim and Hwang Seokyeong. He was prolific even while he was behind bars many times. He published a poetry collection, Gukto (국토 National Territory) in 1975, but it was banned right away. In 1977, he led the publication of Yang Seongu's poetry collection, Gyeoulgonghwaguk (겨울 공화국 Winter Republic) where Park Chung Hee's dictatorship was compared with a winter republic, for which he and Ko Un were arrested. In 1978, the banned poetry collection, National Territory, was translated into Japanese and published by Likasyobo as part of the series of Korean modern poetry, which made him famous for a resistance poet. In 1979 when he had a drinking bout on a rooftop and loudly criticized Park Chunghee and the Yushin dictatorship, he was arrested and put in jail. He was released after 29 days and this has been referred to as Cho Taeil's rooftop event. In 1980, he tried to issue a statement to request the lifting of martial law but he was sentenced 2 years in prison for violation of martial law.

=== Since 1980 ===
In 1988, he played a leading role to reorganize the Council of Writers for Freedom and Practice into the Association of Writers for National Literature and he served as the first executive director. After he became a professor of creative writing in Gwangju University since 1989, he worked on writing poetry as well as poetic theories. He died of liver cancer in 1999. That year, he received a posthumous award. In 2001, the memorial stone for the poem, “Pulssi (Grass Seed)” was set up in Gwangju, and in 2003, Cho Taeil Poetry Literature Hall was built. In 2004, an anthology, Naneun noraega doieotta (나는 노래가 되었다 I Became a Song), edited by Shin Kyeongrim was published. To commemorate the 20th anniversary of his death, the Cho Taeil Literary Award was founded in 2019.

== Writing ==
Lack of Political Freedom and the Public's Resistance

His first poetry collection, Morning Vessel (1965) tends to have modernistic aspects that are somewhat abstruse but he has converted to realism after he was published Theory of Kitchen Knife (1970). Representing his earlier poetry, Theory of Kitchen Knife was considered as a remarkable accomplishment of the 1970s’ poetry that reflected the society. The kitchen knife is a tool to fight against the lack of political freedom as well as a tool to raise self-awareness. At the same time, it does not belong to one person but it is a weapon that can be shared. He considered the public to be an agent of historical development and focused on the public awareness. In that regards, the series of “Theory of Kitchen Knife” particularly shed light on the rage of the public. The rage of the public is ethical conduct that can be justified as lawful resistance of the oppressed.

Through the poetry collection, National Territory (1975), he bluntly criticized the filthy reality compared with the national territory that is filled with freedom and love. In “Gukto seosi (국토 서시 National Territory Prologue),” the grass and stones refer to the public and he depicts the endless vitality of the public.

== Indirect Criticism and Nature-Oriented Tendency ==
His straightforward criticism during the Yushin era turned into a metaphorical form in Gageodo (가거도 Gageodo Island) (1983). He said “The spring has not come yet” in “Bomsomun (봄소문 A Rumor of Spring)” as the Yushin dictatorship was replaced with another military dictatorship. In 1980, witnessing the brutal massacre in Gwangju, he described his rage and frustration that was “burning from deep inside” in a low tone (“Sorideul bunnohanda (소리들 분노한다 Voices Enraged)”).

His poetry of the late 1980s remarkably changed to highlight communion with nature in an effort to sublimate anguish. In “Grass Seed” in Pulkkocheun kkeokkiji anneunda (풀꽃은 꺾이지 않는다 Wild Flowers Are Not Broken) (1995), he described his longing to be a grass seed to return home.

== Works ==
=== Complete Works, Poetry Anthology ===
- 《조태일 전집 (전4권)》, 창비, 2009 / Chotaeil jeonjip (Complete Works of Cho Taeil) (Four Volumes), Changbi, 2009.
- 《다시 산하에게》, 미래사, 1991 / Dasi sanhaege (To the Nature Again), Miraesa, 1991.
- 《나는 노래가 되었다》, 창비, 2004 / Naneun noraega doieotta (I Became a Song), Changbi, 2004.
- 《푸른 하늘과 붉은 황토》, 시인생각, 2013 / Pureun haneulgwa bulgeun hwangto (Blue Sky and Red Clay), Siinsaenggak, 2013.
- 《그래도 봄은 오는가》, 시월, 2016 / Geuraedo bomeun oneunga (Is Still the Spring Coming), Siwol, 2016.

=== Poetry collections ===
- 《아침 선박》, 선명문화사, 1965 / Achimseonbak (Morning Vessel), Seonmyeongmunhwasa, 1965.
- 《식칼론》, 시인사, 1970 / Sikkalron (Theory of Kitchen Knife), Siinsa, 1970.
- 《국토》, 창작과비평사, 1975 / Gukto (National Territory), Changbi, 1975.
- 《가거도》, 창작과비평사, 1983 / Gageodo (Gageodo Island), Changbi, 1983.
- 《연가》, 나남, 1985 / Yeonga (Love Song), Nanam, 1985.
- 《자유가 시인더러》, 창작과비평사, 1987 / Jayuga siindeoreo (Message From Freedom to a Poet), Changbi, 1987.
- 《산속에서 꽃속에서》, 창작과비평사, 1991 / Sansokeseo kkotsokeseo (In Mountains In Flowers), Changbi, 1991.
- 《풀꽃은 꺾이지 않는다》, 창작과비평사, 1995 / Pulkkocheun kkeokkiji anneunda (Wild Flowers Are Not Broken), Changbi, 1995.
- 《혼자 타오르고 있었네 》, 창작과비평사, 1999 / Honja taoreugo itteottne (It Was Burning by Itself), Changbi, 1999.

=== Collection of Poetics, Reviews ===
- 《고여 있는 시와 움직이는 시》, 전예원, 1980 / Goyeoittneun siwa umjikineunsi (Poetry Standing Still and Poetry Moving), Jeonyewon, 1980.
- 《시 창작을 위한 시론》, 나남, 1994 / Si changjakeul wihan siron (Theory for Writing Poetry), Nanam, 1994.
- 《김현승 시정신 연구》, 태학사, 1998 / Kimhyeonseung sijeongsin yeongu (Research on Kim Hyeonseung's Poetry Spirit), Taehaksa, 1998.
- 《알기 쉬운 시창작 강의》, 나남, 1999 / Algiswiun sichangjak gangui (Lecture on Writing Poetry), Nanam, 1999.

=== Co-Author ===
- 《문학의 이해》, 한울, 1992 / Munhakui ihae (Understanding of Literature), Hanul, 1992.

=== Essay Collections ===
- 《시인은 밤에도 눈을 감지 못한다》, 나남, 1996 / Siineun bamedo nuneul gamji motanda (A Poet Cannot Close His Eyes Even At Night), Nanam, 1996.

=== Compilation ===
《아아 내나라-항일민족시집》, 시인사, 1982 / Aa naenara – hangilminjoksijip (Ah, My Nation – Anti-Japanese National Poetry), Siinsa, 1982.

== Works in Translation ==
- 《국토》, 창작과비평사, 1975 / 国土, 梨花書房, 1989
- 《오늘의 한국 문학》/ “Like Dew” and Other Poems, Korean Literature Today, The Korean Center International P.E.N, 1999
- 《아름다운 한국의 현대시들》/ NHỮNG BÀI THƠ HAY CỦA VĂN HỌC HIỆN ĐẠI HÀN QUỐC, Nhà xuất bản Thanh niên, 2015

== Awards ==
- 1991, First Pyeonun Literary Award (In Mountains In Flowers)
- 1992, 35th Jeollanamdo Literary Award
- 1993, Seongok Cultural Award, Grand Prize in Art (성옥문화상 예술부분 대상)
- 1996, 10th Manhae Prize for Literature (Wild Flowers Are Not Broken)
- 1999, Republic of Korea's Bogwan Order of Cultural Merit
