= Báo Mới =

Vietnamese news website

- Website type: Tổng hợp tin tức
- Available in: Tiếng Việt
- Founded: Sept. 15, 2005
- Owners: Nguyễn Thành Long; Nguyễn Anh Tuấn; Trần Quang Đạo; Nguyễn Thanh Tùng
- Website: http://baomoi.com/

Báo Mới ("new newspaper") is a Vietnamese news website. The site is not government owned and just copies news from other site (aggregation). The news site competes with other news websites such as Dân trí.

Báo Mới is a Vietnamese information aggregation website that is fully operated by an automated computer system. According to the site’s owner, approximately 6,500 news articles from nearly 200 official sources from Vietnamese electronic newspapers and news sites are automatically aggregated, categorized, duplicate-detected, grouped by related topics, and displayed according to each reader’s news-reading preferences. The news sources aggregated by Báo Mới include major publications such as Thanh Niên, Tuổi Trẻ, Người Lao Động, VOV, VTC, and many others.

On December 21, 2019, Google removed Báo Mới from all search results. Three days later, the search results were restored.

== History ==
Báo Mới was launched on September 15, 2005, at the domains baomoi.com and baomoi.vn, and was officially licensed by the Ministry of Culture and Information (later Ministry of Culture, Sports and Tourism in 2007) on December 15, 2006.

Báo Mới introduced a new version on Baomoi.com on September 15, 2007, with an interface similar to Digg, allowing users to rate news and create their own categories. The unified version of baomoi.com and baomoi.vn was launched on March 3, 2009.

In 2012, Báo Mới was acquired by the VNG Corporation.

As of December 2019, Báo Mới ranked 21st among the top websites in Vietnam according to Alexa.

== Main functions ==
According to the website’s administrators, Báo Mới offers the following features:

- Content Categorization: The system automatically analyzes news content and categorizes it into appropriate sections.
- Duplicate Detection: The system automatically detects duplicated (copied) articles and groups them under the original content.
- Related Articles Grouping: The system automatically identifies related articles (not copies) on the same topic and groups them together.
- Keyword Extraction: The system automatically extracts keywords from articles, making it easier for readers to search for related information from multiple perspectives.
- Smart Recommendations: Based on readers’ browsing habits, the system can automatically suggest articles of interest to each reader.
