= .vn =

Top-level Internet domain for Vietnam

- Introduced: 14 April 1994
- TLD type: Country Code Top-Level Domain
- Status: Active
- Registry: Vietnam Internet Network Information Center (VNNIC)
- Sponsor: Vietnam Ministry of Information and Communication
- Intended use: Entities connected with Vietnam
- Actual use: Fairly popular in Vietnam
- Registered domains: 618,000 (Q3 2025)
- Structure: Names are registered at second level and third level beneath various second-level categories
- Registry website: VNNIC (Vietnamese); VNNIC (English) tenmien.vn

Old logo used for the domain from 2017 to 2022

.vn is the country code top-level domain (ccTLD) for Vietnam.

The domain name registry for .vn is the Vietnam Internet Network Information Center (VNNIC).

Currently, the national domain name server system of Vietnam consists of seven server clusters. Among these, five clusters are located domestically, and two clusters are located in other countries, with more than 70 points in major cities around the world where there is a high density of .vn domain queries and a significant Vietnamese community.

.vn domain names with 1 or 2 characters are registered through an auction.

There are 43 1-character .vn domain names, including: 36 domain names with a plain ASCII character (a, b, c, .. .x, y, z, 0, 1, 2, 3, .. 7, 8, 9.vn) and 7 domain names with a Vietnam-specific character (â, ă, đ, ê, ô, ơ, ư.vn). There are 1296 2-character domain names with a combination of ASCII characters (a0, a1, a2, ..., z7, z8, z9.vn).

== History ==
In 1994, Rob Hurle was one of the first to think of and be authorized to register the .vn domain for Vietnam, replacing the .au (Australia) domain. VNPT managed the DNS server and the .vn domain.

In 2000, VNPT transferred the DNS server and the .vn domain to the Vietnam Internet Network Information Center (VNNIC) when this center was established by the Vietnamese government.

In 2003, Dot VN, Inc. signed an agreement with VNNIC allowing the company to market the .vn domain overseas.

== Second-level domains ==
The .vn domain name may be registered as a ccTLD or country code second-level domain (ccSLD). Below is a list of ccSLDs under the .vn domain name.

ccSLD	Uses
com.vn	commercial
biz.vn	business; equivalent to com.vn
edu.vn	education and training
gov.vn	state and government (central and local; primarily the executive branch)
net.vn	establishment and provision of online services
org.vn	organizations involved in political, cultural, and social activities
int.vn	Vietnam-based international organizations
ac.vn	organizations and individuals involved in research activities
pro.vn	organizations and individuals involved in highly specialized domains
info.vn	organizations and individuals involved in the creation, distribution, and supply of information
health.vn	organizations and individuals involved in pharmaceutical and medical activities
name.vn	proper names, abbreviations, or aliases of individuals and organizations involved in Internet-related activities
id.vn	Vietnamese citizens for managing personal images, products, and brands in the network environment
io.vn	for organizations and individuals to use for technological applications, platforms, and services in the network environment
ai.vn	for organizations and individuals to use for activities and services related to the field of artificial intelligence
