= Censorship in Vietnam =

Censorship in Vietnam is pervasive and is implemented by the Communist Party of Vietnam (CPV) in relation to all kinds of media – the press, literature, works of art, music, television and the Internet. The government censors content for mainly political reasons, such as curtailing political opposition, and censoring events unfavorable to the party. In its 2021 Press Freedom Index, the Reporters Without Borders (RSF) ranked Vietnam as "very serious" at 174 out of 180 countries, one of the lowest in the world and the worst ranking on their five-point scale. Similarly, Freedom House's 2021 Freedom on the Net report classifies Vietnam as "not free" in relation to the Internet, with significant obstacles to access, limits on content and significant violations of user rights.

The Communist Party of Vietnam classifies the Constitution of Vietnam as the "fundamental and supreme law" of the country. A number of civil and political rights are enshrined within it de jure, such as Article 25, which provides that: "The citizen shall enjoy the right to freedom of opinion and speech, freedom of the press, of access to information, to assemble, form associations and hold demonstrations. The practice of these rights shall be covered by the law." However, despite apparent legal recognition of such freedoms in its Constitution, the exercise of these freedoms in Vietnam is de facto significantly constrained by censorship in many areas and are mostly disregarded, with frequent imprisonments of individuals for being "critical of the state".

Certain topics, especially in relation to political dissidents, the legitimacy of the Vietnamese government, the way the party conducts bilateral relations with other countries, corruption by top party leaders, as well as discussing human rights issues are considered forbidden topics and are censored in a variety of ways by the Vietnamese government, including the use of physical intimidation, imprisonment without trial, destruction of materials and censorship of websites. The Vietnamese government has also made use of online operatives and nationalist netizens to combat any perceived dissent against its position as well as engaging in historical revisionism.

== Historical background ==
=== French protectorate (1858–1945) ===
French authorities in French Indochina were sensitive to anti-colonial sentiment by the Vietnamese. Only French citizens could own newspapers, and they were less likely to be censored by the colonial authorities. As world powers gathered in Versailles to negotiate the Treaty of Versailles ending World War I, nationalist leader Ho Chi Minh joined Vietnamese republicans in presenting a list of demands to the French authorities, notably including a demand for the granting of freedom of the press and freedom of opinion. In response, the Governor General of French Indochina at the time, Albert Sarraut, hinted at the possibility of reform during a 1919 speech in Hanoi. Such reforms were, however, more apparent than real, implemented with the intention of co-opting Vietnamese republicanism. While there was some genuine liberalization of the press, censorship still remained pervasive, including a requirement that all printing presses had to be licensed by the French authorities. Criticism of French rule was not tolerated. Vietnamese writer Nguyen An Ninh's criticisms of French colonial rule in his French-language newspaper, La Cloche fêlée, led to Ninh being imprisoned multiple times and the French authorities shutting down his newspaper eventually.

==== The emergence of public sphere in Saigon in 1920s ====
Even though under the censorship of French colonial state, in the early 1920s, Saigon saw a florescence of newspaper publishing, which enabled and enacted the rise of an urban Vietnamese public political culture of opposition to colonial rule. This phenomenon, Philippe Peycam argued, is similar with the development of a public sphere in 18th century Europe put forward by Jürgen Habermas. In the 1920s, both French and Vietnamese language (Quốc Ngữ) papers sprang up, took forthright positions, debated their peers eagerly, and tested the tolerance of colonial rulers. The French language press was largely free of censorship in Cochinchina, but circulation per day amounted to only several thousand copies total. Vietnamese papers were censored and sometimes shut down, yet they are influential and their daily circulation was large: 10,000 – 15,000 copies of Saigon-based quốc ngữ newspapers were printed daily in 1923 and 22,000 in 1924, though the size of the readership is difficult to be precise.

Along with the rise of journalism in Saigon in the 1920s, a new social urban consciousness as Benedict Anderson's concept of an "imagined community" shaped. The Vietnamese expression Làng Báo Chí, literally, "newspaper village", can be a powerful proof of the emergence of such consciousness. Composed of editors, investors, writers, printers, vendors and youth, who were either from or closely connected to the economic landowning Vietnamese bourgeoisie primarily trained in Franco-Vietnamese schools. The Vietnamese bourgeoisie's devotion to collective political claims was in many ways a product of their new-found sense of individualism, forged in the context of their prosperous positions in colonial Saigon. "Newspaper village" became a social expression of new modes of interaction between individuals as a vector of transformation of Vietnamese sociability. Besides periodicals, the 1920s also saw a parallel explosion of books and booklets, often published by the same groups. The monograph format gave authors more room to develop their arguments, even when only 16 or 32 pages in length.

Journalism played an important role in mobilizing the Vietnamese public against the colonial regime, especially in the events that happened in Spring 1926 (March–July 1926). In March, crowds gathered at Saigon port when the leader of the moderate Constitutionalist Party, Bùi Quang Chiêu returned from a long exile in France and listened to his speeches following news of the arrest of three young journalist-activists, Nguyễn An Ninh, Eugène Dejean de la Bâtie and Lâm Hiệp Châu. In April, the mourning of the nationalist figure Phan Chu Trinh spawned big demonstrations throughout the country, with 50,000 to 70,000 men and women participating. These events constituted a decisive episode in the peaceful public Vietnamese resistance to French colonial rule, a resistance that had begun a few years earlier and had been waged almost entirely through newspapers, which were crucial in rallying the Vietnamese public onto the streets of Saigon. In the 1920s, Saigon was the center of open anticolonial contestation in Vietnam. Following the events of Spring 1926, Saigon's public sphere reframed and saw a parallel evolution toward the constitution of ideologically marked "opinion newspapers" (journaux d'opinion). Contrasted with Journaux d'information, "opinion newspapers" was arguably the distinctive sort of Vietnamese political journalism that appealed to a diverse readership with their collective forums, contributions by specialists, broad political orientation, and clear commercial strategy. After the events of Spring 1926, "opinion newspapers" located themselves within an ideologically diversified spectrum of opposition, and Marxist and socialist theories had growing influence on many journalists, a response to the colonial authorities' resistance to political dialogue and the colonial newspapers' anticommunist hysteria.

From 1928 to 1929, the colonial authorities tightened censorship in Saigon to such a degree that "opinion newspapers" disappeared. Many participants went underground, found themselves in jail, or were forced to flee overseas. Journaux d'information persisted, however, and became more professional, with increased international news coverage, advertising, serialized fiction, and photographs.

==== The development of journalism in Hanoi in 1930s ====
Although in the 1920s, Saigon's effervescent print media failed to trigger similar activity in northern and central Vietnam, Tonkin and Annam, and many young men facing harsher colonial restrictions in Hanoi, Nam Định, and Huế headed south to exciting Saigon, 1930s saw the similar development of journalism and emergence of public space in Hanoi, which spread to other parts of Vietnam. Tự Lực Văn Đoàn (Self-strength Literary Group), arguably the most influential and celebrated intellectuals of the interwar period, published newspapers and books that pushed the limits of French colonial censorship and that carved out a pluralistic public space for dissent and reform. The group launched Vietnam's first satirical newspaper, Phong Hóa ('Mores') in Hanoi in 1932, and later its successor Ngày Nay ('Today'). Besides its prolific journalistic output covering a disparate range of issues and criticizing the backward elements of Vietnamese society, the group was perhaps better known for its modern literature, which was serialized in Phong Hóa and Ngày Nay and carried a reformist bent in both form and content. Overall, in both its literary and journalistic writings, the group sought to reform outdated traditions with new foundations for a modern Vietnamese society.

Although the two newspapers of the group had the intention of protecting national culture and literature, and were moderately critical of colonial policies, they have deficiencies that they were fundamentally reformist and compromising in nature, and they could not avoid instances and issues in which they must compromise with the French colonial state.

==== French Popular Front period (1936–39) ====
During the French Popular Front period (1936–39), there was a more open though short-lived political atmosphere in Indochina, which saw the amnesty of prominent political prisoners and the relaxing of press censorship. In Saigon, the "opinion newspapers" reemerged with a vengeance, and Hanoi became as important a publishing venue as Saigon.

=== Democratic Republic of Vietnam (1945–1976) ===
Following the defeat of the French at Dien Bien Phu in 1954, the Nhân Văn-Giai Phẩm movement began soon after in the north, which was under Communist Party control. Journalists, artists and intellectuals began advocating for a more liberal approach towards writings and other works, inspired by incidents in fellow communist countries. Soviet leader Nikita Khrushchev's denunciation of Joseph Stalin and Mao Zedong's Hundred Flowers Campaign in neighbouring China, in particular, were seen by proponents of the Nhân Văn-Giai Phẩm movement as encouraging developments indicating a less authoritarian and stifling stance towards free expression. The movement did not last long, however, as by late 1956 the Communist Party began to re-assert control over writings. The Communist Party declared in 1958 that the press was to be "the collective agitator, propagandist and organiser, an instrument of the party to lead the masses, a sharp weapon in the class struggle against the enemy".

=== Republic of Vietnam (1955–1975) ===
The newspaper industry was prosperous in the South. According to a study conducted by the Opinion Research Corporation in 1967, almost 60 percent of the Saigon–controlled population read newspapers or had newspapers read to them, and almost a third of that number consulted the press on a daily basis. About one third of the twenty-seven Vietnamese-language newspapers published in Saigon in 1967, averaging almost 700,000 copies printed daily, were sold in the Saigon metropolitan area. When the entire articles or parts of articles were censored, there would be blank spaces in newspapers, which, however, appeared only intermittently. Newspaper readers tended to be urban, educated, male, and residents of southern rather than central Vietnam.

The issue of Vietnamese identity under the background of high American presence was also widely covered by newspapers in the South. Among many newspapers, Chính luận (Political Discussion) was one of the most respected and influential. Founded in the spring of 1964, it was the longest running Saigon daily when the capital fell to communist forces in April 1975. In 1974, it boasted the country's highest daily circulation rate, almost 13 percent (20,000 copies) of the total circulation of Vietnamese-language dailies. Chính luận was seen as neither an opposition paper nor a government paper, and the paper saw itself as a forum for all voices. Besides articles written by journalists, it frequently published letters from readers, without always identifying them as such.

Chính luận also played an important role in covering the discourse of Vietnamese identity. In 1966, Chính luận published a translation of the letter from James R. Kipp, a US Navy serviceman stationed in Vietnam, who criticised Vietnamese for their bad habits based on his observations of daily life in Vietnam and refuted the claim of Vietnam's "four thousand years of civilization". Kipp's letter made many Vietnamese readers angry and produced an avalanche of responses from them, which provided counterexamples to refute Kipp's negative stereotypes, highlighted historical events to justify their claim to "four thousand years of civilization," and defended the reputation of Vietnamese women. The Kipp affair represents, in miniature, some of the ways that the American intervention in the Republic of Vietnam shaped South Vietnamese ideas about their cultural identity and political community.

Overall, from 1965 to 1969, many articles published in the inner pages of Chính luận show that Vietnamese responded to the impact of the American presence on Vietnamese society by categorizing Vietnamese and Americans as separate groups, by expressing an emotional sense of group membership, and by attempting to discursively rectify Vietnameseness through definitions of collective identity. Readers and regular writers, through the newspaper, tried to define Vietnamese identity by highlighting Vietnam's historical and literary heritage, by constructing ideal images of Vietnamese womanhood, by requiring certain attributes for community inclusion, and by drawing boundaries to delineate group membership. However, there was also a simultaneous expression of gratitude for Americans who defended Vietnamese freedom. It reflects the tension of desiring Vietnamese autonomy and accepting American assistance in the Republic of Vietnam.

=== Socialist Republic of Vietnam (1976–present) ===
Upon the Communist conquest of the South in 1975 and the subsequent reunification, the Communist Party began a "cultural purification" policy of Thanh Lọc in the south, requiring all media to be reviewed by the Party's propaganda branch. General Tran Bach Dang, the head of propaganda, declared the culture of the former South Vietnam to be "a slave culture promoted by American imperialists in order to destroy the Revolution" as such, all cultural remnants of the former South Vietnam had to be destroyed. Entire libraries were purged of books, while a number of writers and artists were sent to re-education camps. Prior to Đổi Mới, only socialist-style art sanctioned by the state was allowed, and all artists seeking to have their works showcased needed to have their works approved by the state-managed Vietnam Fine Arts Association. For many years there was only a single television channel available – the state-run Vietnam Television, until it increased to two stations in 1990.

== Subject matter and agenda ==
=== Press censorship ===
==== Local press ====
All press in Vietnam is state-owned, either wholly or partially. Under the 1990 Press Law (which was updated in 2016), reporters were granted a legal right to information-gathering, and hindering reporters from doing their work was criminalised. At the same time, the Press Law declared that the media had to be a "forum for the people" while being the Communist Party's mouthpiece. Vietnam's Law on the Media requires journalists to "propagate the doctrine and policies of the Party, the laws of the State, and the national and world cultural, scientific and technical achievements [of Vietnam]". Various laws were later passed in 1992, which made criticism of the Communist Party an offence. Topics which remain off-limits to the press include sensitive topics such as unflattering coverage of the Communist Party, criticism of government policy, Sino-Vietnamese relations and democracy. Article 88C of Vietnam's Penal Code forbids "making, storing, or circulating cultural products with contents against the Socialist Republic of Vietnam".

To ensure nothing objectionable is published in the press, the Central Propaganda Department of the Communist Party in Hanoi meets every Tuesday. Party officials from the Ministry of Information and Communications, Ministry of Public Security, newspaper editors and publishers are also in attendance. Each newspaper's performance in the preceding week is assessed – newspapers which have followed Party guidelines are commended, while those which have deviated from Party guidelines by publishing unwanted news about more sensitive topics are reprimanded or even punished. Sometimes, the editors are given instructions as to how their reports should be written. The Communist Party continues to expect the press to be "the voice of party organizations, State bodies, and social organizations".

Despite close state control, however, censorship of the press has been comparatively loosened since the Đổi Mới reforms of the 1980s. Prior to Đổi Mới, there was mainly only one state newspaper available, the Nhân Dân. There has been a media boom, such that today there are over 800 newspapers and magazines available in Vietnam covering a wide variety of topics from interior decoration to golf. The Communist Party, wishing to deal with widespread grievances over low-level corruption, ordered the press to report on these instances of corruption. This has put the press in a contradictory position – on one hand, the press was state owned (at least partially), while on the other hand, the press was expected to report on corruption within the state itself. Cain characterises the Vietnamese press as falling in the middle of the spectrum between that of a "watchdog press" and the press of an authoritarian state. Hayton notes that the Communist Party is split between those in favour of greater press freedom and more conservative members suspicious of press freedom – thus, policy has to be acceptable to both groups.

Although the Communist Party remains sensitive to any questioning of its legitimacy or more serious allegations, the Party has tolerated the press exposing low-level corruption and misdeeds. Đổi Mới gave rise to financial incentives for newspapers to keep their readership levels high – thus, newspapers wishing to stay popular "aggressively pursue scandals, investigate 'social evils' and champion the downtrodden". So long as it stays out of sensitive political matters, the Vietnamese press has carved out areas where it is free to report more autonomously – chiefly in relation to social, economic, cultural and legal matters. More autonomous reporting by the press has had beneficial effects to the Communist Party, such as when investigative reporters incriminated Ho Chi Minh City mafia boss Năm Cam and the corrupt government officials collaborating with him, leading to their arrests.

At the same time, there remain limits to investigative reporting by the press, especially when the reporting paints the more important members of the Communist Party hierarchy in a negative light. In the PMU 18 scandal in 2006, various state-owned newspapers reported that the head of the most well-funded Vietnamese development agency, PMU 18, had been betting large sums of money on European football matches. The next few months saw a flurry of journalistic activity, with many high-ranking officials such as the Transport Minister and his deputy, the head of the Prime Minister's Office and a Major-General from the Ministry of Public Security being exposed in one way or another by the press, leading to several resignations. The exposés came to an end, however, after the Thanh Niên newspaper suggested without naming names that dozens of "important people" had also taken bribes. This was unacceptable to the Communist Party as it implied corruption had reached the highest echelons of the Party, resulting in some of the journalists and the police informants who were involved in the reports being charged in court with various offences. In 2014, a freelance journalist was severely beaten by security forces in Ho Chi Minh City. In 2021, five journalists were sentenced to prison for spreading anti-state content.

==== Foreign press ====
The Communist Party monitors foreign language press published in Vietnam. Foreign newspapers and magazines have been made to recall published issues, or have been reprimanded by Party officials, over disrespectful or sensitive publications. For example, the Vietnam Investment Review was forced to recall issues of their magazines when they placed a picture of the then-Prime Minister Võ Văn Kiệt underneath a photograph of a cyclist riding a bicycle. Some foreign publications also have resident censors from the Ministry of Culture, Sports and Tourism and the Ministry of Information and Communications, who ensure nothing objectionable is published.

Under Vietnam's Press Law, foreign journalists are required to seek permission from the Press Department of the Ministry of Foreign Affairs five days before commencing any journalistic activities. This applies to every single trip, phone call or interview the journalist wishes to conduct. Many foreign journalists, however, do not adhere to this legal requirement. Hayton suggests that the law is not actively enforced, so long as journalists steer clear of sensitive matters. Journalists who have, however, covered sensitive topics against the wishes of the Communist Party have been refused visas to enter Vietnam, and some reporters have also been turned away at the airports even though they possessed valid visas.

=== Literary censorship ===
Bass describes Vietnamese censors as having "nearly succeeded in wiping out an entire generation of Vietnamese writers, driving them into silence or exile". Literary works, including works of fiction and poetry, are tightly controlled, going through a process with several checks and approvals before a final piece of literary work is allowed to be published. Only state publishing houses are allowed to produce printed books – thus, a private, non-state entity wishing to produce printed books must find a state publishing house willing to collaborate with it to publish a "joint publication" under the auspices of the state publishing house. Books with politically sensitive subject-matter tend to be rejected by state publishing houses, preventing such works from even being published in the first place. Even when a state publishing house agrees to publish a book, in-house editors within the publishers go through the text and remove any sensitive material. After this, the book is sent to state censors, who exercise another round of checks.

To save state censors the hassle, many editors thus strive to censor as much as possible before sending the final book to the state censors – and sometimes, may even decide to let an entire book go unpublished. Writers themselves often engage in the practice of self-censorship, with self-censorship being described as "the Gordian Knot of the Vietnamese publishing industry". Even after publishing, censorship can still take place, especially when certain books only become controversial after publication. In such cases, books which have already been published and are being sold in bookstores may be confiscated by the state and pulled out of circulation. In 2002, authorities in Ho Chi Minh City conducted a book burning, destroying 7.6 tonnes of books the authorities deemed "culturally poisonous".

As a result of such censorship practices, several prominent Vietnamese authors have decided to remain silent and not publish anymore, or go into exile and publish their works overseas. Bảo Ninh, author of the prize-winning book The Sorrow of War, largely stopped publishing new works since then, and considered the censorship regime to have resulted in the absence of a "generation of young writers" in Vietnam today. Dương Thu Hương, a former Communist Party member, was expelled from the Party in 1990 and arrested in 1991 over some of her controversial writings. She left Vietnam to live in exile in Paris, although most of her works remain illegal in Vietnam. Exiled writer Phạm Thị Hoài, living in exile in Berlin, took to publishing her works on the Internet, where they are popular with tens of thousands of Vietnamese readers both within and outside Vietnam. In response to the popularity of her website, government hackers attempted for years to close her website through cyber-attacks.

=== Artistic censorship ===
Visual arts which do not portray the Communist Party or its leaders favourably are censored, together with works containing nudity and sexuality. All art exhibitions also require official exhibition permits from the Ministry of Culture, Sports and Tourism before they are allowed to take place. Despite this, however, unlike the press and literary works, the visual arts arguably has more autonomy and is not as subject to the same degree of censorship. It has been suggested that "the artist has possibly the freest voice in Vietnam".

The phenomenon of Vietnamese artists enjoying relative freedom results from a number of factors: Widespread corruption, lack of education and understanding of art among government officials and police make censorship difficult to implement. It is often possible for artists to bribe officials from the Ministry of Culture, Sports and Tourism so that their art can be displayed. Additionally, Vietnamese people have apathetic attitudes towards art since the attention of the purchasing class is focused on luxury goods, while visual art is not considered as one of them. The apathy to contemporary art becomes advantageous in terms of censorship since art is deemed less influential than media, press and Internet. Another important factor is the abstract nature of contemporary art, which makes it difficult to pinpoint the messages of artists. At the same time, many artists have their own ways of resisting censorship – using "sneaking" skills in their work, namely creating artwork which can be interpreted in multiple ways, such that an acceptable, state-friendly explanation can be given to censors, while simultaneously, a more provocative and subversive interpretation lies in the background.

=== Music censorship ===
In contemporary Vietnam, music censorship is most commonly achieved through prior restraint and restriction: officially, music must be approved in advance by state censors connected to the Ministry of Culture before it is publicly performed, broadcast, or released as a recording. The suppression of music and musicians is less routine and is typically a last resort when the censorship system of prior restraint and restriction has proved ineffective. Việt Khang, a Vietnamese singer, wrote two songs in response to Vietnamese government's crackdown on the anti-Chinese demonstrations caused by the Spratly Islands dispute. He was sentenced to four years in prison followed by two years of house arrest in 2012 for "conducting propaganda against the state" under Article 88 of the Penal Code.

Music censorship in Vietnam mainly comes from actions of state censorship agencies instead of market-based decisions within the music industry. Although the "Đổi Mới" market economic reforms were introduced in Vietnam in 1986, the state has retained a tight hold over all official media. Vietnam does not have a large market-driven music industry comparable, so the importance of private media companies in relation to censorship is limited.

However, in Vietnam, the control of musical expression by the state censors is not total or absolute, the prohibition of music is rarely done in an open, transparent way, and there is often confusion about what is or is not permitted and why. The confusion also encourages self-censorship by musicians. Typically, musicians have to second-guess what might be censored, and this encourages them to err on the side of caution. Censors in the Ministry of Culture and the directors of the state-run radio and television companies, record labels, and publishing houses are often not clear about what they should and should not permit. Such ambiguity can lead to arbitrary decisions, which are usually not fully explained or justified, and this fosters a climate of caution and restraint.

=== Television censorship ===
Television is widely popular in Vietnam with television ownership estimated at 98% of the population. Prior to 2000 there were only two state-owned television channels available in Vietnam. Since then, there are multiple television channels available, including international channels such as BBC World News or CNN International. However, international channels are broadcast with a 10-minute delay to allow censors to stop any broadcasts which are politically sensitive. Television content about the Vietnam War, the Cold War or events in China have been blocked using this method, preventing them from being broadcast. Satellite television is officially restricted, although some people in Vietnam do continue to use their own home satellite equipment to receive satellite television.

=== Internet censorship ===
The arrival of the Internet in Vietnam can be traced to 1997, after years of testing and deliberations by the Party's Central Committee on how to address the Internet's "bad influences". All internet service providers in Vietnam can only connect to Internet exchange points controlled by the state, allowing for ease of filtering. There are three major Internet Service Providers in Vietnam – VNPT, FPT and Viettel, two of which are government-owned . Collectively, these three ISPs control more than 90% of the market. Politically, morally or religiously sensitive websites are blocked by the state. In order to operate a local website in Vietnam, a Vietnamese domain has to be registered, which requires the website to be hosted on Vietnamese computers within Vietnam – allowing for greater state control over what gets published on the website. All companies and organizations which operate websites containing material relating to "politics, economics, culture and society" or social networks are required by law to register with the government. These companies and organizations are also required to maintain a server within Vietnam to facilitate government requests for information.

The Communist Party has undertaken more restrictive measures as a result of the increasing challenges blogs and social media have presented to the Party. In 2008, the Ministry of Information and Communications introduced new rules banning Internet content which "opposes the state ... undermines national security, social order and safety, causes conflict or discloses national security, military or economic secrets" – a very broad definition allowing for many types of Internet content to be banned.

Blogs, in particular, have increased in political importance since 2006, such that the Vietnamese blogosphere today is an "active online public sphere" and blogs are seen by many Vietnamese as a source of alternative viewpoints from official government media. Activist bloggers have written about controversial subjects in Vietnam such as human rights, freedom and democracy, and some have even questioned the legitimacy of the Communist Party's right to rule and criticised important political figures. Some of these blogs are extremely popular, with readerships exceeding those of state-run websites. To censor such material, the Communist Party employs methods such as sending malware to bloggers, abusing the bloggers verbally or physically, and imprisoning the bloggers.

Although the Communist Party does suppress blogs which it deems problematic, it has also harnessed the outreach of blogs for its own purposes. Factionalism between rival groups in the Communist Party has led to blogs being used "as tools to expose political scandals and infighting among political elites". Political blogs are thus not always censored in a blanket fashion, but are sometimes used by rival Party factions to promote or discredit certain individuals. The Communist Party itself employs pro-Party bloggers to praise the Party and its policies. The state Propaganda and Education Department employs 900 employees, managing about 400 online accounts and 20 blogs so as to "monitor and direct online discussions on everything from foreign policy to land rights".

Unlike China, where censorship policies have managed to successfully block many foreign websites and created Chinese substitutes for major sites like Google and Facebook, Vietnam has been far less successful in Internet censorship in this regard, with Vietnamese substitutes such as Vinaseek and go.vn being poorly received. Bass considers that "Western technology arrived too suddenly and was embraced too enthusiastically to be blocked". Vietnam has about 55 million regular Facebook users, while YouTube and Google Search are extremely popular. Former Prime Minister Nguyễn Tấn Dũng considered it impractical to ban Facebook, noting that many government officials used it themselves.

A consequence of this is that unlike China, Vietnam can only block online content after it has been put up – thus, many bloggers are beaten up after posting anti-government material as a form of physical intimidation, and people can be imprisoned for their online posts. An estimated 200 activists and bloggers are imprisoned for criticising the government on the Internet. In 2016, the government detained Nguyen Ngoc Nhu Quynh, a blogger who criticized the government's reaction to a chemical dump by a Formosa Steel plant. This is one of several cases of the Vietnamese government using vague national security laws to punish bloggers. In August 2018, a Việt Tân member was arrested and sentenced to 20 years in prison for Facebook posts which the government considered to be an attempt to overthrow the state. In July 2020, a court sentenced a 29-year-old Facebook user, Nguyen Quoc Duc Vuong, to eight years in prison for making anti-government posts, including several criticising communist leader Ho Chi Minh.

In addition, the government is also known to hack the online accounts of Vietnamese bloggers and other Internet activists, report the Facebook pages of anti-government users as spam so the pages get taken down, or blackmail Internet activists with stolen personal information. To better monitor articles which are posted online by local websites, the government-linked Vietnam Journalists Association launched dedicated software in 2017. The Ministry of Information and Communications also commenced a software project to manage "misleading" information on the Internet.

Websites and social network operators based within Vietnam are required to allow the government to check local servers upon request, as well as possess a method to remove content within three hours of notification by the government. This does not apply to websites and social network operators based outside the country – however, under a 2018 cybersecurity law approved by the National Assembly, this lacuna in censorship looks set to be closed from 2019. Global technology firms such as Facebook and Google would be required under the law to store personal data on Vietnamese users in Vietnam itself, potentially allowing for the Vietnamese state to force the companies to provide them with this personal data and to censor unwanted online posts. In 2020, both of these firms were accused of being 'complicit' in the censorship by aiding the Vietnamese government in censoring criticism and repressing dissent.

=== Film censorship ===
Date	Title	Notes
1995	Xich lo (Cyclo)	Banned for being too "westernised" in its portrayal of urban poverty in the country.
2001	Green Dragon	Banned as of 2002.
2002	We Were Soldiers	Banned as of 2002.
2010	Sex and the City 2	Banned because of a conflict of "cultural values".
2012	The Hunger Games	Banned because of extreme violence and killing.
2012	The Girl With The Dragon Tattoo	Banned because its international distributor, Sony Pictures, did not accept the requirement by the Vietnamese National Film Board of cutting out some sensitive scenes.
2019	Abominable	Taken out of cinemas over a scene showing the nine-dash line that is used by the People's Republic of China to lay claim to parts of the South China Sea.
2021	Taste	Banned because of a conflict of "culture values".
2022	Uncharted	Banned because of a scene showing the nine-dash line that is used by the People's Republic of China to lay claim to parts of the South China Sea.
2022	The Roundup	Banned because of "violent scenes" and negative portrayal of Ho Chi Minh City.
2023	John Wick: Chapter 4	Unofficially banned because of the appearance of Donnie Yen, who supports the nine-dash line that is used by the People's Republic of China to lay claim to parts of the South China Sea.
2023	Barbie	Banned from cinemas because one of its scenes shows maps allegedly featuring the nine-dash line that is used by the People's Republic of China to lay claim to parts of the South China Sea; the Tien Phong newspaper reported that the map appears multiple times throughout the film. The claims were defended by Warner Bros., the film's distributor, who issued a statement saying that the map was a 'child-like crayon drawing' and that it was 'not intended to make any statement'.

== See also ==
- Internet censorship in Vietnam
- Human rights in Vietnam
