= Vietnam Internet Network Information Center =

Logo of VNNIC

The Vietnam Internet Network Information Center (VNNIC; Vietnamese: Trung tâm Internet Việt Nam, lit. 'Internet Center of Vietnam') is the National Internet Registry that was found on 28 April 2000 in Vietnam. It manages several aspects of Internet operations, including the allocation of IP addresses and AS numbers. VNNIC is the administrative agency responsible for Internet affairs under the Ministry of Information and Communications (Vietnam).

Historically, VNPT managed the .vn top-level domain; in 2001 the management of the .vn domain was transferred to the VNNIC.
