= Saigon Times =

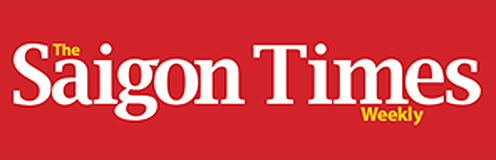
logos

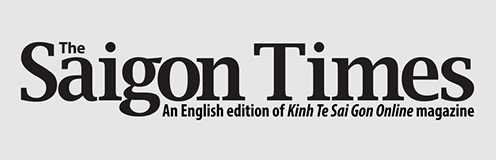
logos

The Saigon Times is a Vietnamese media organization with two Vietnamese- and two English-language publications. Its flagship publication is Thoi Bao Kinh Te Saigon, the most widely-read weekly economics and business news magazine in Vietnamese. It also publishes Saigon Times Daily, one of the two major daily newspapers in English (the other being the daily Vietnam News, published by the Vietnam News Agency).
