= VietNamNet =

Vietnamese online newspaper

- Logo of the global (English) edition of VietNamNet
- Type: Online newspaper
- Owner: Ministry of Information and Communications
- Editor-in-chief: Nguyễn Văn Bá
- Staff writers: More than 300
- Founded: December 19, 1997; 28 years ago
- Political alignment: Yes
- Language: Vietnamese, English
- Headquarters: C’Land Building - 156 Xã Đàn 2, Nam Đồng, Đống Đa, Hanoi
- Sister newspapers: tintuconline.com.vn 2sao.vn vef.vn Infonet.vn ictnews.vn
- Website: vietnamnet.vn (vi-VN) vietnamnet.vn/en (en-US)

VietNamNet (abbreviated as VNN) is an online newspaper in Vietnam affiliated to the Ministry of Information and Communications. Its content is published daily in both Vietnamese and English, and cover categories including international news, information technology, sports, music, fashion, online interviews, etc. It is located in Đống Đa, Hanoi.

== History ==
VietNamNet was granted the latest operating license on January 23, 2003.

On May 15, 2008, it was proposed that VietNamNet's ownership be transferred from VNPT to Vietnam's Ministry of Information and Communications.

In 2019, VietNamNet and Vietnam Post online newspapers were merged.

== Hacker attacks ==
On January 4, 2011, VietNamNet's server was attacked by hackers - who then gained control of hundreds of thousands of computers. At that time, this was the largest denial-of-service attack to have ever happened in Vietnam – some compared it to the case of hackers attacking the US Department of Defense's website in 2009.

Google and McAfee later revealed there was evidence that the hacker groups were affiliated with the Vietnamese government. However, editor-in-chief Nguyễn Anh Tuấn insisted that he did not believe the government was behind this attack.
