= Le Courrier du Vietnam =

Vietnamese state-owned French-language newspaper

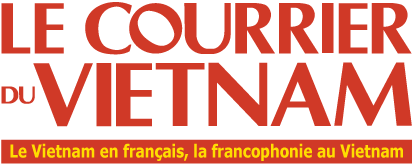
- Owner: Ministry of Information and Communication
- Publisher: Vietnam News Agency
- Founded: 1964; 62 years ago
- Language: French
- Headquarters: Hanoi, Vietnam
- Country: Vietnam
- Website: Official Website

Le Courrier du Vietnam (French: [lə kuʁje dy vjɛtnam]) is the only French-language newspaper published in Vietnam. It was first established in 1964 in Hanoi and has since been the most circulated French language news medium in Vietnam and Southeast Asia.

Le Courrier du Vietnam also broadcasts French language and cultural programs (the latter usually in Vietnamese) weekly on VTV1, the primary news channel in Vietnam. The newspaper used to be daily but is currently weekly.
