= Tuổi Trẻ =

Daily newspaper in Vietnam

- Tuổi Trẻ front page on 1 August 2021
- Type: Daily newspaper
- Format: Compact
- Owner(s): Ho Chi Minh City Newspaper, Radio and Television
- Editor-in-chief: Lê Thế Chữ
- Associate editor: Lê Xuân Trung; Đinh Minh Trung
- Founded: September 2, 1975
- Language: Vietnamese
- Headquarters: Tuổi Trẻ Tower; 60A Hoang Van Thu Street, Ward 9, Phú Nhuận District, Ho Chi Minh City
- Country: Vietnam
- Circulation: 500,000 daily
- Website: tuoitre.vn (vi-VN) news.tuoitre.vn (en-US)

Tuổi Trẻ ([tuəj˧˩˧ ʈɛ˧˩˧] or [tuəj˧˩ t͡ɕɛ˧˩]; transl. Youth) is a major daily newspaper in Vietnam under the Ho Chi Minh City Newspaper and Radio and Television, published in Vietnamese by the Ho Chi Minh City branch of the Hồ Chí Minh Communist Youth Union, the youth wing of the Communist Party of Vietnam. While it is still the official mouthpiece of that organization, it has grown to become the largest newspaper in the country. As of 2009, the publication had been distributed nationwide with an average of 450,000 copies printed, at times reaching more than half a million copies a day.

The printed newspaper includes: Tuổi Trẻ daily, weekly Tuổi Trẻ Cuối Tuần, semimonthly Tuổi Trẻ Cười. Online versions includes: a Vietnamese version Tuổi trẻ Online and an English version Tuoi Tre News.

== History ==
Four months after the withdrawal of U.S. troops from Vietnam, following a suggestion from General Secretary Lê Duẩn during a working session with the City Youth Union, Tuổi Trẻ was officially established on September 2, 1975. The predecessor of the newspaper had existed as a bulletin of the Saigon – Gia Định Union of Youth, Students, and Pupils (under the Propaganda Department of the Ho Chi Minh Revolutionary People's Youth Union). Initially, the publication had a modest circulation of only 5,000 copies per week, but this figure doubled between 1975 and 1980. By 1981, the paper was issued twice a week with a circulation of 30,000 copies per issue, eventually rising to 450,000 to half a million copies per day by the end of the first decade of the 21st century.

"Why is it that before 1975, anyone who owned a newspaper in Saigon would be rich, but now Tuổi Trẻ is always holding out its hand for money and paper every year, spending every penny it receives? Is there any way to become self-reliant, Tuổi Trẻ must strive to increase circulation, increase publishing frequency, and proactively overcome difficulties rather than rely on support from above..."

— Feedback from the late Prime Minister Võ Văn Kiệt during a working session with Tuổi Trẻ in 1980.

Earlier, in April 1980, during Vietnam’s subsidy period, Võ Văn Kiệt, who was then Secretary of the Ho Chi Minh City Party Committee, decided to gradually cut budget subsidies, so as to restore financial autonomy to the Tuổi Trẻ newspaper. This marked the beginning of Tuổi Trẻ's transformation. To sustain itself, the newspaper established a chemical workshop that produced goods for paper factories, in exchange for raw materials used in printing. Then, it also began launching supplementary publications, the most notable of which was Tuổi Trẻ Cười—Vietnam’s first satirical media publication since the fall of Saigon—with its first issue published in 1984. On April 30 of the same year, the newspaper founded its own printing factory to fully take control of production in order to meet the growing market demand. The factory was named after martyr Lê Quang Lộc – a Youth Union officer who died on April 14, 1975 in Hóc Môn while advancing toward Saigon during the Ho Chi Minh campaign.

In 2003, the official online version of the newspaper was launched on the Internet at the address tuoitre.com.vn. According to statistics from Alexa, a company under Amazon, at the time of its launch, Tuổi Trẻ Online ranked 39,238 among a total of 3 billion websites globally, with foreign traffic accounting for 58.72% of total visits. By 2021, it had risen to 19th place on the list of the top 50 websites in Vietnam. Additionally, in 2010, Tuổi Trẻ ranked 6th among the top 100 most popular newspapers in Asia and 34th among 200 periodic media publications worldwide, according to the international media directory and search site 4 International Media & Newspapers. In 2018, after a three-month suspension of operations, the website’s visual interface was updated to optimize the user experience.

In its early days, the newspaper had its headquarters at 55 Duy Tân Street, Phạm Ngọc Thạch, District 1, Ho Chi Minh City, before relocating its editorial department to 60A Hoang Van Thu Street, Ward 9, Phú Nhuận District. On June 18, 2010, the English-language online newspaper Tuoi Tre News was established, and a year later, the Tuổi Trẻ mobile platform was launched on mobile devices. In 2020, the publication came under the management of the Ho Chi Minh City Party Committee, and two years later, the newsroom began piloting a Podcast section to diversify distribution channels and better reach audiences in the digital space. By 2023, Tuổi Trẻ continued its merger with the newspaper Báo Khăn Quàng Đỏ in line with the government's directive on the roadmap for restructuring, developing, and managing media agencies in Vietnam.

== Stance ==
Described as "pro-reformist" by the BBC, the newspaper has had issues with the communist authorities on several occasions.

In May 1991, its editor-in-chief was sacked when the paper ran an article trepidly acknowledging Ho Chi Minh's early marriage to Zeng Xueming. Ms. Vu Kim Hanh, former Tuoi Tre Newspaper's editorial direction, was dismissed.

In 2000, it commissioned a survey among youths in Ho Chi Minh City which found that Bill Gates was more admired than Ho Chi Minh. This resulted in the published copies being destroyed by state censors and three editors sanctioned.

In 2005, the newspaper published a series of investigative articles about the monopolization of the pharmaceutical market by Zuellig Pharma. The reporter, Lan Anh, was subsequently dismissed.

In July 2018, the government suspended the newspaper from publishing online for 3 months and fined it 220 million VND. The disciplinary action came after the newspaper published an article on June 19, 2018 quoting President Trần Đại Quang agreeing with the need for a new law regarding protests. It left in place a reader's comment, in another article previously published on May 26, 2017, that was deemed by the Press Authority to be "splitting national unity". The Press Authority determined that the content of the article quoting the President was "untrue" and "caused severe impact".

== See also ==
- List of newspapers in Vietnam
- Media of Vietnam
