= Vietnam News Agency =

Government agency

- Type: News agency
- Founded: 15 September 1945; 81 years ago
- Headquarters: 5 Ly Thuong Kiet, Hoan Kiem District, Hanoi, Vietnam
- Key people: Vu Viet Trang, General Director
- Owner: Government Organization
- Subsidiaries: Sports & Culture; Le Courrier du Vietnam; Việt Nam News; VietnamPlus; Vietnam Law & Legal Forum
- Website: vnanet.vn/en/

Vietnam News Agency (VNA, Vietnamese: Thông tấn xã Việt Nam) is the official state-run news agency of the Socialist Republic of Vietnam. It operates more than 30 foreign bureaux worldwide and maintains 63 bureaux in Vietnam — one for each city and province, including 6 in ASEAN.

It exists alongside the Vietnam Television (VTV) and the Voice of Vietnam (VOV) being the official information agencies under direct administration of the State owned.

== History ==
- The Vietnam News Agency was founded on 23 August 1945 shortly after the August Revolution. On 15 September 1945, Ho Chi Minh's Declaration of Independence of Vietnam and the Provisional Revolutionary Government of Democratic Republic of Vietnam member list were broadcast through the VNA in Vietnamese, English and French.
- Not long after the launch, in 1946, VNA opened its first foreign news bureau in Bangkok
- At 20:00, 19 December 1946, Vietnam News Agency transmit the Appeal for National Resistance, compiled by President Ho Chi Minh. The Agency concomitantly evacuated all of its infrastructural properties into the resistance area.
- In 1947, VNA transmitted the Chinese-language news called Vietnam News. This bulletin was later halted on the following year.
- In 1948, VNA opened the second foreign bureaux in Yangon.
- Vietnam News Agency begun to receive the news from big information agencies such as ITAR-TASS, Xinhua since 1949. Two years later, the bureau of the Agency in Moscow, Beijing and Paris has been opened.
- In 1954, the First Indochina War ended. VNA relocated the headquarters back to Hanoi.
- In 1960, the Liberation News Agency was founded to broadcast news in South Vietnam.
- On 24 May 1976, the Vietnam News Agency and the Liberation News Agency were merged into the new Vietnam News Agency.
- On 12 May 1977, the National Assembly Standing Committee of the Socialist Republic of Vietnam issued a resolution approving the change of the Vietnamese name of the agency from "Liberation News Agency " into "Vietnam News Agency".
- On 13 June 1982, VNA issued España '82 Flash News, a special publication to provide the coverage of World Cup 1982. Two months later, the weekly newspaper International Culture & Sports was established on the basis of the España '82 Flash News. The original publish days of the newspaper were every Fridays.
- The second weekly newspaper of the VNA, Weekly News, was launched on 14 May 1983, circulating every Saturdays. This publication was renamed simply to The News from 1 January 1999 following the merger of Weekly News and Afternoon News, another publication of the VNA.
- In 1991, VNA begins the publication of Viet Nam News, a national English-language daily.
- From 1994 the VNA began to operate and own Le Courrier du Vietnam, the French-language daily newspaper from the Ministry of Culture and Information
- In 2008, the VietnamPlus website was launched, which published news in Vietnamese, English, French and Spanish.
- On 21 June 2010, the Vietnam News Agency Television Channel went on experimental broadcast. The channel was officially launched on 25 August, with launching ceremony was attended by then-Prime Minister Nguyen Tan Dung.
- From 31 December 2016, The News newspaper ceased the daily edition and relaunch the weekend edition back to its original name Weekly News after an eighteen-year hiatus.

== Products ==
Vietnam News Agency oversees the following publications and programmes:

- Print publications:
  - The News, with weekly edition on Thursdays and News on Ethnic Minority and Mountainous Regions on Tuesdays
  - Sports & Culture, with weekday print version, monthly magazine Sports & Culture - Men
  - Ethnic Minority and Mountainous Region Pictorial, a monthly periodical published in 11 minority languages of Vietnam
  - Vietnam Pictorial, a magazine published in 10 foreign languages
    - Beauty, a monthly magazine
    - Vietnam-Korea Times, a weekly Korean-language periodical
  - Vietnam and World Economics, a periodical
  - Viet Nam News and Viet Nam News Sunday
  - The Courier of Vietnam a weekly French-language magazine
  - Vietnam Law & Legal Forum, a monthly English-language magazine
    - Official Gazette, an English translation of legal bulletin Justice Newspaper, published thrice-weekly
- Online publications:
  - vnanet.vn, an online news portal
    - vietnam.vnanet.vn, the electronic edition of Vietnam Pictorial
    - vietnamlaw.vnanet.vn, the electronic edition of Vietnam Law & Legal Forum
  - Bnews.vn, a business news website
  - baotintuc.vn, the electronic edition of The News
  - VietnamPlus at vietnamplus.vn
  - thethaovanhoa.vn, the electronic edition of Sports & Culture
  - dantocmiennui.vn, the electronic edition of Ethnic Minority and Mountainous Region Pictorial
  - vietnamnews.vn, Ovietnam.vn, and Bizhub.vn, publications of Viet Nam News
  - VietnamPlus, an online newspaper
- Digital platforms:
  - Vietnam News Agency Digital Media Centre (VNA Media)
  - VNA Media programmes Economic Focus, Message from History, Moments and Events, Vietnam and International Friends, and Studying Uncle Ho’s moral example every day
    - Affiliated with Sports & Culture: Culture Panorama, Planet of Sports, and Culture Radar
    - Affiliated with Le Courrier du Vietnam: Francophone Space
