= Sài Gòn Giải Phóng =

Newspaper published from Ho Chi Minh City, Vietnam

- Format: Print, online
- Owner(s): Ho Chi Minh City Newspaper, Radio and Television
- Political alignment: Ho Chi Minh Thought; Socialist-oriented market economy
- Language: Vietnamese, English and Chinese
- Headquarters: Ho Chi Minh City
- ISSN: 0866-8825
- Website: sggp.org.vn (vi-VN) en.sggp.org.vn (en-US)

Sài Gòn Giải Phóng (English: Liberated Saigon) also known as SGGP and Saigon Giai Phong, is a Vietnamese Communist Party newspaper published from Ho Chi Minh City in Vietnam under the Ho Chi Minh City Newspaper and Radio, Television. It is published in Vietnamese, English and Chinese. Its Chinese print version uses Traditional characters, while its online version's characters can be toggled between Traditional and Simplified ones, publishing its first print edition just five days after the April 30, 1975 event according to the decision of the Sài Gòn - Gia Định Regional Party Committee. As the pioneering unit in the whole city to own an electronic news site at the beginning of the 21st century, eight years later, Sài Gòn Giải Phóng continued to be the first press agency in the country to publish an online print newspaper.
