= Thanh Niên =

Vietnamese newspaper

- Founded: January 3, 1986; 40 years ago
- Language: Vietnamese
- Headquarters: Ho Chi Minh City
- Sister newspapers: Vietweek (defunct), Thanh Niên News (defunct)
- Website: thanhnien.vn

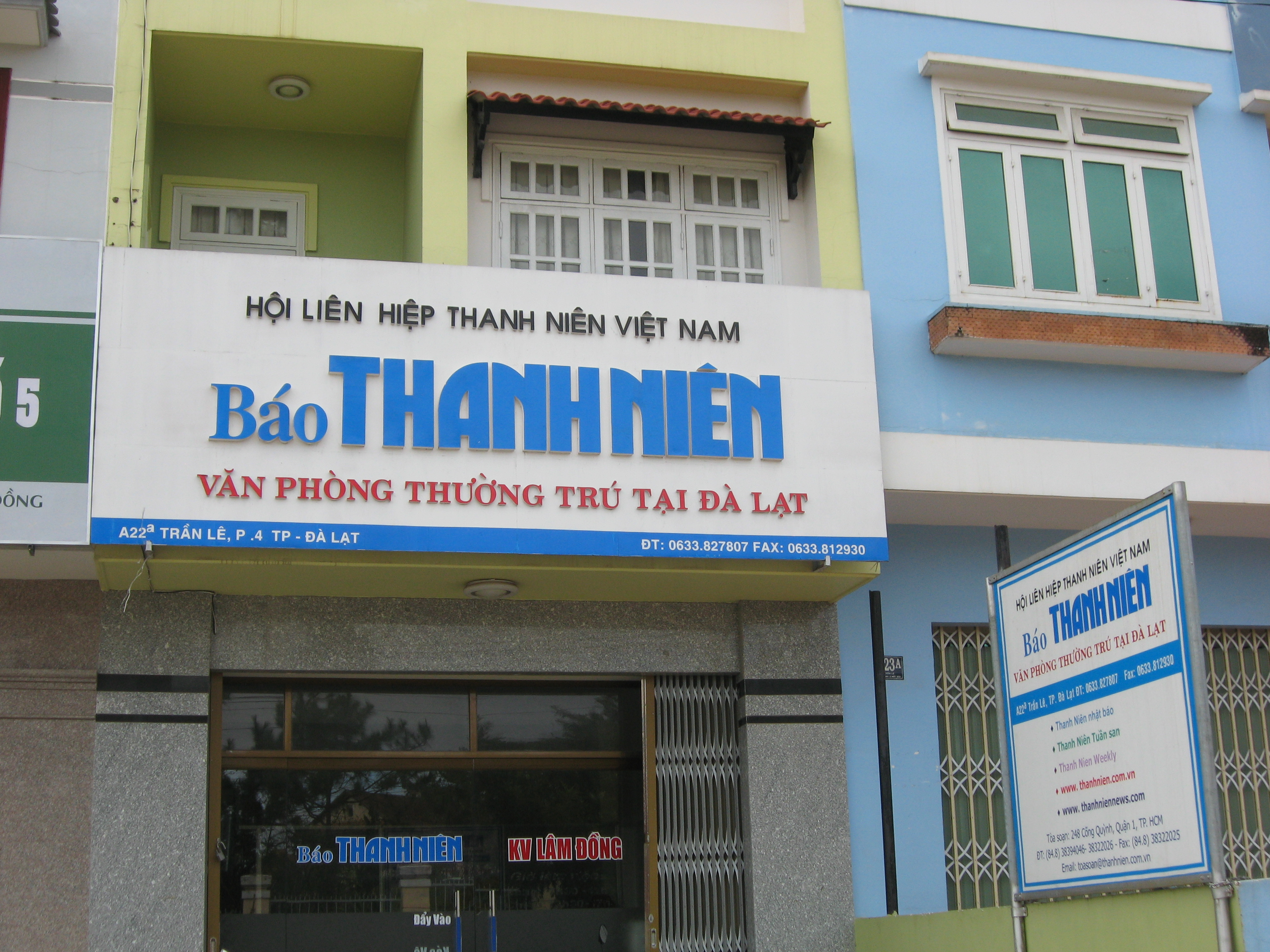
An office of Thanh Niên in Đà Lạt, Lâm Đồng Province.

Thanh Niên (transl. Young People) is a Ho Chi Minh City-based Vietnamese-language newspaper in Vietnam. It was the second most circulated newspaper in Vietnam in 2009, with an average circulation of 300,000. Thanh Niên News is released daily in Vietnamese language. Thanh Niên is an official organ of the Vietnam United Youth League (Vietnamese: Hội Liên hiệp Thanh niên Việt Nam) and mainly focuses on social affairs, especially those that involve the youth. The newspaper announced the closure of its English language website, which was known as Thanh Niên News, on September 16, 2016, due to company reorganization.

Before its closure, the English edition went through several rebranding. It began as Thanh Niên Weekly and became Vietweek on January 6, 2012. When Vietweek ceased print publication, the name of the website, Thanh Niên News, took over.
