= Ministry of Information and Communications (Vietnam) =

Government ministry of Vietnam

Socialist Republic of Vietnam Ministry of Information and Communications
- Vietnamese: Bộ Thông tin và Truyền thông

Ministry overview
- Formed: 28 August 1945
- Preceding Ministry: Ministry of Information and Propaganda (1945–1946); Ministry of Propaganda (1946); General Bureau of Information and Propaganda, Ministry of Home Affairs (1946); Bureau of Information (1946–1952); Bureau of Propaganda and Culture (1952–1954); Ministry of Propaganda (1954–1955); Ministry of Culture (1955–1977); Ministry of Culture and Information (1977–1981); Ministry of Culture (1981–1990); Ministry of Culture, Information, Sports and Tourism (1990–1991); Ministry of Culture, Information and Sports (1991–1992); Ministry of Culture and Information (1992–2007); Ministry of Post and Telecommunication (2002–2007); Ministry of Information and Communications (2007–2025)
- Dissolved: 18 February 2025
- Superseding agencies: Ministry of Science and Technology; Ministry of Culture, Sports and Tourism
- Type: Government Ministry
- Jurisdiction: Vietnam
- Headquarters: 18 Nguyen Du Street, Hanoi
- Annual budget: 893.790 millions VND (2018)
- Minister responsible: Nguyễn Mạnh Hùng
- Deputy Minister responsible: Nguyễn Huy Dũng Phan Tâm Nguyễn Thanh Lâm Phạm Đức Long

Ministry of Information and Communications (Vietnamese: Bộ Thông tin và Truyền thông) was a government ministry in Vietnam. It was responsible for administration and regulation of newspapers, publishing, the postal service, telecommunications, internet, broadcasting, radio and radio frequency, information technology, electronics, television and national media infrastructure.

On 18 February 2025, the Ministry of Information and Communications ceased operations and merged with the Ministry of Science and Technology.

== Ministerial units ==
- Department of Posts
- Department of Science and Technology
- Department of Planning and Finance
- Department of International Cooperation
- Department of Legal Affairs
- Department of Personnel and Organisation
- Ministry Inspectorate
- Ministry Office
- Bureau of Radio Frequency Management
- Bureau of Telecommunications
- Bureau of National Digital Transformation
- Bureau of Press
- Bureau of Publication, Printing and Distribution
- Authority of Broadcasting and Electronic Information [vi]
- Bureau of Foreign Information Service
- Bureau of Basic Information Service
- Bureau of Information and Communications Technology Industry
- Representative Office of the Ministry in Ho Chi Minh City
- Representative Office of the Ministry in Da Nang City

== Administrative units ==
- National Institute of Information and Communications Strategy
- Vietnam Internet Network Information Centre (VNNIC)
- Information Centre
- Information and Communications Journal
- Centre for Press and International Communications Cooperation
- Information and Communications Public Management School
- Vietnam Institute of Software and Digital Content Industry (NISCI)
- Information and Communications Publishing House
- Vietnam Cybersecurity Emergency Response Teams/Coordination Center (VNCERT/CC)
- Vietnam Public Utility Telecommunications Service Fund
- Vietnam-Korean Friendship Information Technology College
- Printing Technology College
- VietnamNet Newspaper
- Office of National Steering Committee on Information and Communication Technology
- Vietnam ICT Project Management Unit
- Posts and Telecommunications Institute of Technology (PTIT)
