= List of programmes broadcast by VTC =

Programs by Voice of Vietnam

This is a list of programs that have been and are being broadcast by VTC Digital Television, belonging to the Voice of Vietnam.

== VTC1 ==
- Khoảnh khắc Vàng (tiền thân của Thời sự Tổng hợp)
- Sao Online
- Gia đình Online
- Khúc hát quê hương
- Tôi 20
- Di sản văn minh thế giới
- Khúc vọng xưa
- Tạp chí tổng hợp khai thác
- Đêm thời trang
- Thời trang Việt Nam
- Cửa sổ công nghệ
- Các nhà văn Việt Nam
- Khai thác đặc sắc
- Hộp thư VTC
- Phim điện ảnh thể thao
- Gương mặt trang bìa
- Chương trình ca nhạc
- Thế giới ẩm thực
- Chuyện doanh nhân
- Lời muốn nói
- Thần đồng đất Việt
- Miss Audition
- Bí mật thế kỷ
- Bản tin thời tiết
- Thị trường Việt
- Doanh nghiệp 24G (phát sóng song song với BTV3)
- Con người & tự nhiên
- Gia đình Online
- Bản tin 113
- Di sản kiến trúc
- Không gian Việt
- Sóng nhạc K-Pop
- Tạp chí điện ảnh trẻ
- Tạp chí bất động sản
- Doanh nhân cuối tuần
- Doanh nhân & cộng đồng
- Xứng danh bộ đội cụ Hồ
- Xã hội thông tin
- Góc cười
- Điện ảnh trẻ
- Nhịp điệu trẻ
- Doanh nghiệp số
- Thế giới trẻ
- Đẹp +
- Chặng đường xanh
- Góc nhìn không gian
- Bản tin Giờ vàng
- An toàn giao thông
- Lần theo dấu vết
- Thế giới điện ảnh
- Thế giới giải trí
- Bất động sản 24h
- Đêm của bóng đá
- Alo bác sĩ
- Trên sàn Catwalk
- Miền đất lạ
- Đời sống giải trí
- Chứng khoán 7 ngày qua
- 8 lạng nửa cân
- Mẹ tuyệt vời nhất
- Thể thao 24h
- Chị và em
- Giai điệu điện ảnh
- Nhịp sống thể thao
- Trạng cờ Quý Tỵ
- Thời sự tổng hợp (phát sóng song song với VTC2 (2009 – 2011); VTC5 (2008) & VTC14 (2009 – 2013)
  - Thông tin thị trường
  - Nóng trên mặt báo
- Giờ tin sáng
- Góc nhìn cuộc sống
- Đa chiều
- Khúc tình ca
- Bản tin sáng
- Bản tin chiều
- Bản tin đêm
- Bản tin cuối ngày
- Góc nhìn thẳng
- Bản tin kinh tế
- Địa ốc 24h
- Sức khỏe cộng đồng
- Sản phẩm và tiêu dùng
- Kinh tế và tiêu dùng
- Nông thôn chuyển động
- Cà phê tối
- Giai điệu ngày mới
- Billboard
- Điểm báo
- Bài hát của tôi
- Điểm đến
- Khám phá thế giới
- Con người và tự nhiên
- Hồ sơ vụ án
- Tạp chí bóng đá thế giới
- Tạp chí Golf
- Gõ cửa phim trường
- Người bán hàng chuyên nghiệp
- Nhịp cầu nhân ái
- Music Faces
- Đất & người Miền Trung
- Tạp chí kinh tế cuối tuần
- Tiêu điểm thể thao
- Lần theo dấu vết
- Phiêu lưu cùng ẩm thực
- Đảng đổi mới & phát triển
- Truyền hình xanh
- Khám phá thương hiệu
- Bác sĩ gia đình
- Chân dung cuộc sống
- Vẻ đẹp Việt
- VTC Không khoảng cách
- Ô tô xe máy
- Tuổi thần tiên
- Con ong chăm chỉ
- Cẩm nang gia đình
- Diễn đàn lập pháp
- Nhất nghệ tinh
- Truyền hình thời đại số
- Một vòng Online
- Đi và trải nghiệm
- Tôi khác mỗi ngày
- Hành trình tri thức Việt
- Tư vấn sức khỏe
- Thông điệp từ quá khứ
- Thị trường chứng khoán
- Nốt nhạc trẻ
- Thương hiệu Việt
- Thương hiệu và thị trường
- Mỗi ngày 1 phong cách
- Sống phong cách
- Người nổi tiếng
- Thế giới ẩm thực
- Thế giới Adam
- Tạp chí điện ảnh
- Ống kính du lịch
- Tạp chí cuối tuần
- Tạp chí Nhịp Mode
- Nhân tài đất Việt
- Cuộc sống tươi đẹp
- Nhịp sống Châu Âu
- Tóc và trang điểm
- Một nửa thế giới
- Khám phá thế giới
- Trò chuyện cuối tuần
- Giao diện số
- Còn mãi với thời gian
- Đảng trong đổi mới và phát triển doanh nghiệp
- Đàn ông muốn nói
- Phong cách
- Tư liệu thể thao
- Chân trời du học
- Khu vườn tuổi thơ
- Giai điệu điện ảnh
- Văn hóa cuối tuần
- Văn hóa Mobile
- Nhịp sống Online
- 25 phong cách ấn tượng
- 10 phút cập nhật
- Hành trình rẻo cao
- Phim tài liệu khoa học
- Top Ten
- Không gian âm nhạc
- Chúng ta ăn gì
- Nhật ký chống dịch COVID-19
- Tạp chí du lịch
- Billboard Thể thao
- iMusic Top Hits
- Đến với nghệ thuật thứ 7
- Sành điệu
- Bản tin văn hóa
- Alo bác sĩ 24
- Rap Kids
- Bản tin trưa
  - Bản tin thể thao
- Bản tin tối
  - Chuyện trong ngày
  - Tin quốc tế
  - Bản tin thể thao
- Tin đầu giờ (9h, 11h, 15h, 16h)
- Phim truyện
- Bình luận bóng đá
- Tin nóng
- Tin nhanh
- Cuộc sống 24h (phát sóng song song với VTC14)
- Chào buổi tối (phát sóng song song với VTC14)
- Thế giới nghiêng
- Góc nhìn khán giả
- Đường dây nóng
- Phim tài liệu
- Tạp chí Biên giới – Biển đảo
- Việt Nam Online (phát sóng song song với VTC2 (2009 – 2011); VTC5 (2008); & VTC14 (2009 – 2013)
- 10 phút cập nhật
- Xe+
- Sống kết nối
- Học nghề ở đâu?
- Giờ hướng nghiệp
- 22h + II
- Góc nhìn
- Sống khỏe thế kỷ 21
- Phiêu lưu cùng Gulliver
- Sự kiện tuần tới
- Nhịp sống mới
- Góc cuộc sống
- Cool & Break
- Giờ thứ 9
- 360 độ Showbiz
- Bài hát Mộc
- Tạp chí kinh tế & tiêu dùng
- Giải mã
- Nóng dư luận
- Giờ sức khỏe
- Quang Huy bình luận
- Trao cơ hội – Nối ước mơ
- Nhịp đập thị trường
- Bếp hồng
- Tiêu điểm thị trường
- Từ nông thôn nhìn ra thế giới
- Tự soi tự sửa
- Tạp chí thương hiệu và thị trường
- Phố bất động sản

== VTC2 ==
=== Movies channel + VTC Olympic, VLife (2004-2008) ===
- Phim truyện
- Phim truyện cuối tuần
- Thế giới điện ảnh
- Hành tinh số
- Hi Fashion
- Nhịp sống thể thao
- Thể thao

=== Technology channel + #Kenh2 & Redius TV (2008-now) ===
- Con đường sức khỏe
- 100 câu hỏi vì sao của bé
- Go Music
- Emovies (Tiền thân của Phim +)
- Let's Go
- Tuần này ai lên sóng
- Cuộc sống đích thực
- Thế giới Mobile
- Học nghề ở đâu?
- Giờ hướng nghiệp
- Đổi mới sáng tạo Việt Nam
- Đẹp hơn mỗi ngày
- Tuần công nghệ
- Góc khám phá
- Ai là ai
- Lets Go
- Phong cách số
- Thiên tài nhí
- Cafe @
- Chat với 8x
- eMovies
- Sao băng
- Thời sự STI (Thời sự ICT)
- Đỉnh cao công nghệ
- F5 Refresh
- Bạn có thể?
- Những công dân @
- Thế giới xe
- Xã hội thông tin
- Thế giới Mobile
- Kho vàng tri thức
- My Playlist
- Bóng đá FIFA Online
- Thời sự ICT (Tiền thân của Thời sự STI)
- Thế giới là 8
- Inbox
- Người bán hàng chuyên nghiệp
- Bác sĩ máy tính
- Thế giới xe
- Hành tinh số
- Báo chí Online
- Tạp chí Fifa Online
- Tạp chí thể thao điện tử
- World Cup Fifa Online
- Phổ cập tin học cộng đồng
- Thời sự tổng hợp (phát sóng song song với VTC1 & VTC14)
- Truyền hình thời đại số
- 10 phút cập nhật
- Ngộ nghĩnh
- Nhân vật sự kiện thông tin truyền thông
- Báo cuối tuần
- Chuyện lạ
- Địa chỉ ngân hà
- Người tìm đường
- Lần theo dấu vết
- Vietnam Top Ringtons
- Thử thách cực đại
- Những kỷ lục thế giới
- Việt Nam Online (phát sóng song song với VTC1 & VTC14)
- Xổ số Kiến thiết Miền Bắc (trực tiếp lúc 18h; 2011 – 2012)
- Bản tin Techspot
- Re – Why?
- The Start Up Bulbs
- Start-Up 101 Series
- Techdoor – Cánh cửa công nghệ
- Việt Nam 4.0
- Kết nối chuyển giao công nghệ
- Nhịp sống mới
- Alô bác sĩ 24
- Sống kết nối
- Phim +
- 22h + II
- Giai điệu thao trường
- Xe+
- Sống khỏe thế kỷ 21
- Giờ sức khỏe
- Kinh tế số
- Góc nhìn người tiêu dùng
- No Comment
- Tôi khác mỗi ngày
- Giải mã
- Thế giới động vật
- Ấn tượng Việt Nam
- Nhịp sống mới
- Khám phá Việt Nam
- Top Vietnam
- Di sản văn hóa
- Thế giới xe xanh
- Tình huống nguy hiểm – Thử thách khắc nghiệt
- Chinh phục máy tính
- Khởi nghiệp
- Bản tin COVID-19
- Xu hướng 24h
- Một vòng online
- Vòng tay yêu thương
- Đấu trường cờ Việt
- Trạng cờ Quý Tỵ
- Điểm nóng đời sống công nghệ
- Đầu tư cùng Start up
- Ấn tượng Việt
- Góc nhìn chiến tranh

== VTC3 ==
- Tư vấn sức khỏe
- Tường thuật bóng đá
- Phim truyện
- Thể thao 365
- Ngôi sao ngày ấy
- Bóng đá thế giới tuần qua
- Tạp chí thể thao tổng hợp
- Toàn cảnh bóng đá thế giới
- Tạp chí Boxing
- Tạp chí đua xe
- Tạp chí cúp C1
- Tạp chí Golf
- Tạp chí phụ nữ và thể thao
- Tạp chí bóng đá thế giới
- Tạp chí bóng đá châu Á
- Tạp chí bóng đá 5 châu
- Tạp chí bóng chày
- Tạp chí thể dục dụng cụ
- Huyền thoại thể thao
- Thể thao mạo hiểm
- Tạp chí quần vợt
- Thế giới Ngoại hạng Anh
- Lịch sử thể thao thế giới
- Ấn tượng bóng đá Việt Nam
- Ấn tượng thể thao
- Thế giới những người khổng lồ
- Bình luận thể thao
- Những ngôi sao Olympic Bắc Kinh 2008
- Bình luận chuyên đề
- Cảm xúc thể thao
- Tạp chí thể thao
- Bình luận chuyên đề
- Sống khỏe mỗi ngày
- Hỏi đáp bác sĩ
- Alô bác sĩ 24
- Phiêu lưu cùng ẩm thực
- Đi và trải nghiệm
- No Comment
- Tôi khác mỗi ngày
- Con ong chăm chỉ
- Điểm đến
- Thế giới động vật
- Giải mã
- Góc nhìn
- Sống khỏe thế kỷ 21
- Xe+
- Bí ẩn chưa lời giải
- Doanh nghiệp và thương hiệu
- Con đường thể thao
- Thể thao Zoom
- Thể thao 24h
- Cool & Break
- Vòng quay bóng đá Việt Nam
- Tường thuật thể thao
- Tường thuật bóng đá
- Tường thuật Futsal
- 3S+ (Sports, Showbiz, Social Media+)
- Giờ giải trí
- Xu hướng 24h
- Xổ số Vietlott
- Điểm đến
- Sống khỏe mỗi ngày
- Thanh

=== ON Sports + ===
- On Sport News
- Thế giới thể thao
- Thể thao Việt Nam
- Tường thuật bóng đá
- Tường thuật V.League
- V.League Replay
- Sắc màu Văn hóa – Giải trí
- Camera On
- Cảnh báo tội phạm
- Cảnh báo từ cuộc sống

== VTC4 ==
- Phát lại các chương trình của VTC
- Khúc tình ca
- Giai điệu quê hương
- Sân khấu cải lương
- Gia đình Online
- Bứt phá môn tiếng Anh thi THPT với VNU-IS
- Đẹp +
- Càu vồng trái tim
- Chúc ngủ ngon
- Lễ hội tình yêu
- Điểm hẹn Đồng Nai
- Doanh nghiệp và thương hiệu
- Quả táo đỏ
- Thời trang phương tiện
- Tóc mây môi hồng

=== Yeah1TV + Yeah1 Family ===
- For You
- 1+1=1
- 51 Job
- Bring It
- A2Z
- Alo Alo
- Style Star
- If You Can - Nếu bạn có thể
- Trước ống kính
- Chinh phục
- Style+
- Đùa một chút
- Phim truyện
- Bé làm người lớn
- Câu chuyện âm nhạc
- Hát hay, hay hát
- Photographer show
- Làn sóng Hàn Quốc
- Tín đồ Shopping
- Sổ tay phong cách
- Thư viện hits
- Cửa sổ V-Pop
- Kiến thức Fashion
- V Music
- Giới trẻ vào bếp
- Valy âm nhạc
- Playlist – Nhạc theo chủ đề
- Căn phòng số 8
- Phong cách thảm đỏ
- Khoảnh khắc thay đổi số phận
- Leo Show
- Cơn bão 8
- Teen Sports
- Style Star
- Chinh phục lọ lem
- 4 ngày yêu
- Bật mí bí mật sao
- Thật và thách
- Hát tự nhiên
- Này bạn, bạn nghĩ sao
- K Music
- Tôi làm DJ
- Jukeon
- Cửa sổ âm nhạc
- Nấu ăn cùng sao
- Làn sóng Hàn Quốc
- Gương mặt ảnh bìa
- Yeah1 Music
- Thời trang người nổi tiếng
- Sống để yêu nhau
- Đẹp mỗi ngày

== VTC5 ==
- Bạn có thể?
- Cafe @
- Thông điệp từ quá khứ
- Xe 360°
- Bí ẩn không xa lạ
- Doanh nghiệp 24G
- Thế giới Mobile
- Xã hội thông tin
- Thế giới GAME
- Chat với 8x
- Hành tinh số
- Chiếc hộp âm nhạc
- Văn hóa Game
- Hội tụ số
- Nhạc cổ điển
- Di sản kiến trúc
- Khoa học kỳ thú
- Chuyện lạ
- Ngộ nghĩnh
- Thế giới quanh ta
- Nhật ký bác sĩ
- Địa chỉ thiên hà
- Thời sự tổng hợp (phát sóng song song với VTC1)
- Khoảnh khắc vàng (phát sóng song song với VTC1)
- Bản tin Giờ vàng
- Việt Nam online (phát sóng song song với VTC1)
- Doanh nghiệp 24h (phát lại từ VTC1)
- Thông điệp cuộc sống
- Đêm của game
- Phim truyện
- Go Music (phát lại từ VTC2)
- Hành tinh mãi xanh
- Khoa học kỳ thú
- Khi bé hỏi tại sao
- Khám phá
- Lần theo dấu vết
- Hành tinh Eureka
- Thử thách cực đại - Takeshi's Castle/Most Extreme Elimination Challenge

=== VBC ===
- Phim truyện
- Album Online
- Hành trình bốn phương
- Chuyện bốn phương
- Cán cân công lý
- Cẩm nang cuộc sống
- 10 sự kiện đáng chú ý tuần qua
- Giải mã tội ác
- Group X – Khỏe & năng động
- Nhảy cùng Fimbles
- Bác sĩ tình yêu
- Mở cửa trái tim
- Chuyện to chuyện nhỏ
- Chuyện của sao
- Chuyện bốn phương
- Điểm hẹn cuối tuần
- Yoga cho thai phụ
- Đại hội võ lâm
- Sắc màu tình bạn
- Siêu đầu bếp
- Top V Clip
- Phụ nữ thời đại
- Phù thủy tóc
- Lương y có như từ mẫu
- Pháp luật và cuộc sống
- VBC Cười
- Ô cửa ABC
- Hoa khéo tay
- Hoàng tử bóng đá – Soccer Prince
- 10 sự kiện dở nhất tuần qua
- Những giá trị của thời gian
- Khỏe đẹp mỗi ngày
- Giai điệu trẻ
- Tin tức đó đây
- Úm ba la...măm măm
- Anh hùng tứ phương
- Hẹn hò bí mật
- Tin tức giải trí
- Cửa sổ thứ 7
- 1357
- Bà kể cháu nghe
- Hoa khéo tay
- 113 online
- Top Hit Music
- VBC Music
- Nhịp sống hôm nay
- Vì sự nghiệp trồng người
- Bước chân thần tốc
- Music Stories
- Music Theme
- Sức khỏe vàng
- Yoga của tôi
- Sức sống những bài ca
- Blog âm nhạc
- Sắc màu không gian
- Timeless Melody
- Sao 360
- Hát cùng VBC
- Giả mạo nhân tài
- Tiếng nói người dân
- Tiếng nói doanh nghiệp
- 1000 kiểu chết
- Giai điệu thần tiên
- Doctor Who
- Nghệ sĩ và ẩm thực
- Vườn tuổi thơ
- Phong cách thời trang
- PNJ Sliver Stars

=== SofaTV ===
- Phim truyện
- Nụ cười vàng
- SĐẹp
- Nhanh vào bếp
- Tận hưởng cuộc sống
- Điểm hẹn du lịch

=== TVBlue ===
- Vô địch hài
- V Playlist
- Bạn có bình thường? (phát lại)
- Trẻ em luôn đúng
- Nhịp đập K-pop
- Đánh thức cơ thể
- Khám phá ASEAN
- Vị khách bí ẩn
- Món ăn của ngôi sao
- Ẩm thực bốn phương
- Taxi Show
- Đại chiến Rapper
- Nhóm nhạc Stray Kids
- Ca sĩ ẩn danh
- Thử tài Yang Nam
- Học viện thần tượng
- Mộc
- Giọng hát bí ẩn
- Đấu trường âm nhạc – 101 – Produce 101
- Bếp nhà làm
- Tân tây du ký
- Đẹp cùng sao Hàn
- Đánh thức cơ thể
- Phim truyền hình

=== SCTV ===
- Cười đa cảm xúc
- Tour de Vietnam
- Sống ở Việt Nam
- Chuyến xe mê ly
- Làng nghệ Việt (phát lại từ VOVTV)
- Sách và cuộc sống (phát lại từ VOVTV)
- Về chốn linh thiêng (phát lại từ VOVTV)

== VTC6 ==
- Tư vấn sức khỏe
- Chuyên gia của bạn
- Khỏe đẹp cùng chuyên gia
- Điện ảnh trẻ
- Sống khỏe mỗi ngày
- Đưa nghị quyết vào cuộc sống
- Văn hóa tâm linh Việt
- TVShopping Queen
- Dòng chảy sông Hồng
- Chuyên gia của bạn
- Alô bác sĩ 24
- Xu hướng 24h
- Music Home
- Bản tin xanh
- Mỗi ngày một làn điệu
- Phim truyện
- Xổ số Vietlott
- Qua miền Tây Bắc
- Tiêu dùng 24/7
- Tiến tới Đại hội XIII của Đảng
- Văn hóa tâm linh Việt
- Con là để yêu
- Doanh nghiệp và cuộc sống
- Vươn cao Việt Nam
- Tôi khác mỗi ngày
- Dạy hát chèo trên truyền hình
- Hành trình hạnh phúc
- Tiêu dùng thông minh
- Sức khỏe vàng
- Nhịp sống mới
- Hát cùng đam mê
- Chân dung nghệ sĩ
- Nhà mát
- Chào buổi tối
- Giải mã
- Đấu trường cờ Việt

=== Saigon Channel ===
- Phim truyện Việt Nam
- Phim truyện nước ngoài
- Ống kính du học
- Blog Music
- Thế giới đa sắc màu
- Sắc màu Sài Gòn
- Doanh nghiệp và sự kiện
- Thế giới số
- Góc lạ quen
- Không gian đa chiều
- Địa ốc & đô thị
- Phim hoạt hình
- Phim kinh điển
- Phim Châu Á
- Phim Quốc tế
- Điện ảnh thế giới
- 15 phút điểm tin quốc tế
- Clip của tôi
- Khóa Sol
- Bé yêu
- Người giữ lửa
- Phim tài liệu
- CEO Talk
- Business to Finance
- Tạp chí kinh tế cuối tuần
- Góc nhìn thể thao
- Clip của tôi
- Những ngôi sao nhỏ
- B2F

== VTC7 ==
- Sân khấu
- Phim truyện
- Bình luận bóng đá

=== TodayTV ===
- Today Life
- Tôi yêu chợ Việt
- Tôi là hoa hậu hoàn vũ Việt Nam
- Kinh tế cuối tuần
- Ẩm thực đại chiến
- Tạp chí địa ốc
- Nói vui mua nhiều
- Những khúc vọng xưa
- Sao Online (chuyển sóng từ VTC)
- Tổ ấm yêu thương
- Chiếc cân may mắn - Perfect Balance
- Một phút tỏa sáng
- Xổ số Vietlott
- Cứ nói đi
- Hãy đồng ý
- Hương vị ẩm thực
- Nhà đẹp quanh ta
- Trạng cờ Quý Tỵ (chuyển sóng từ VTC)
- Ống kính thời trang
- Trạng cờ đất việt
- Khỏe và đẹp
- Xổ số các tỉnh miền Nam
- Dự báo thời tiết
- Hi 5 - Cùng hát cùng chơi
- Đuổi hình bắt chữ
- San sẻ yêu thương
- Tám là chính
- Vòng tay yêu thương
- Tri kỷ
- Làm mẹ
- Chuyện nhà mình
- Sống để yêu thương
- Dr. You – Sức khỏe cho mọi nhà
- Khát vọng đông quê
- Vươn tới ước mơ
- 360 độ làm đẹp
- Bữa tối của Bòn Bon
- Today Playlist
- Today Sport
- Today House
- Today-M
- Quà tặng giờ vàng
- Phút thư giãn
- Ẩm thực độc đáo
- Bước nhảy xì tin
- Nhịp điệu cuộc sống
- Tài năng Việt
- Thế giới nhà bếp
- Today Music
- Cẩm nang sống
- Tôi đồng ý
- Đẹp mỗi ngày
- Dự báo thời tiết
- Hạnh phúc bất ngờ
- Lữ khách 24h
- Gia đình tài tử
- Thử tài thiết kế nội thất
- Tivi Shopping
- Đẹp không giới hạn
- Cảnh báo an toàn sống
- Phim truyện
- Today 18h
- Ngẫu hứng âm nhạc
- Người vẽ ước mơ
- Cười lên nào – Just For Laughs Gags
- Thế giới điện ảnh
- Tư vấn sức khỏe
- Let Me In – Tự tin tỏa sáng
- Mẹ yêu bé
- Tư vấn sức khỏe & tiêu dùng
- Nhỏ to cùng mẹ
- Thế giới âm nhạc
- Trải nghiệm và tin dùng
- Tiếp sức hồi sinh
- Mảnh ghép cuộc đời
- Vũ điệu cuộc sống
- Hành trình lột xác
- Hóng chuyện
- Xuân này tết xưa
- Đặc sản miền Tây
- Tết nay làm gì
- Ấm tình lòng xuân
- Mỹ vị 24
- Nhất gia bách truyện
- Cơm ngon con khỏe
- Tư vấn sức khỏe và tiêu dùng
- Cùng hát cùng chơi
- Trò chuyện cùng chuyên gia (talkshow)
- MTV Chat Attack
- Thế giới rộng lớn
- Thông điệp cuộc sống
- Gia vị yêu thương

=== VTC ===
- Phát lại các chương trình từ các kênh VTC

== VTC8 ==
=== VITV ===
- Hàn thử biểu
- Đối thoại
- Hộp tin Việt Nam
- Tâm chấn
- Tạp chí Xây dựng và Bất động sản
- Giờ thứ 9
- Tiêu điểm
- Tin mới
- Bản tin Xuất nhập khẩu
- Bữa sáng doanh nhân
- Năng động châu Á
- Bàn tròn doanh nghiệp
- Chuyển động châu Âu
- Vòng xoáy châu Mỹ
- Điểm sóng – Hot Stock
- Luật sư của doanh nghiệp
- Tiêu điểm vàng
- Kinh tế toàn cầu
- Câu chuyện thời trang
- Diễn đàn CEO
- Tiêu điểm kinh tế
- Thế giới sự kiện
- Tạp chí ngân hàng
- Khám phá thương hiệu
- Việt Nam & tiềm năng
- Môi trường kinh doanh
- V Tài chính
- Trên từng kinh tuyến
- Chứng khoán ngành
- Into Vietnam
- 100° Fashion
- Thư viện doanh nhân
- ART World
- Hành trình tri thức
- Thế giới kỳ quan
- Tạp chí Golf
- Sắc màu muôn phương
- VITV Gặp gỡ

=== ViewTV ===
- Sắc màu muôn phương
- Báo chí Kinh tế tuần qua
- Kinh tế tuần qua
- Luật sư doanh nghiệp
- Vietnam – EU Biz
- Chứng khoán cuối tuần
- Chuyên đề Tài chính thuế
- Thể thao tuần qua
- Hành trình âm nhạc
- Đế chế thời trang
- Một vòng Showbiz
- Lời hồi đáp
- Chạm
- Tối nay 8 giờ
- Bản tin View 24
- Đổi mới để phát triển
- Phát triển kinh tế xã hội miền núi biên giới và hải đảo
- Vì chủ quyền biên giới biển đảo quốc gia
- Đất Phương Nam
- Kỹ năng sống
- Nhật ký hành trình
- Hộp bí mật
- Nhật Bản ẩm thực du hí
- Tám là chín
- Lăng kính nhỏ
- 10 phút thử thách
- Hội hâm mộ showbiz
- Đẹp ư ? đơn giản
- W.O.W Nicole
- Tips 10 – Sổ tay gia đình trẻ
- Để đó chồng lo
- Chuyển động Nhật Bản
- Nấu ăn cùng Ochikeron
- Quán quen món ruột
- Ứng dụng tương lai
- Chất như người Nhật
- Nghe cầu vồng nói
- Showbiz 101
- Một vòng Xi nê
- Irasshaimase Sài Gòn
- Nhật ngữ trong nháy mắt
- Top Ten
- Ongaku – Vui với âm nhạc

=== VTC ===
- Lớp học không khoảng cách
- Thành Lương Live
- Quang Huy bình luận
- Phát lại các chương trình từ các kênh VTC

== VTC9 ==
=== VTC Olympic 2008 + VTC9 ===
- Bình luận Olympic
- Phát lại các chương trình ca nhạc cổ của VTC

=== Let's Viet ===
- Let's Cà phê
  - Góc nhân ái
  - Cà phê sáng
  - Tiêu điểm
  - Một chuyến đi
  - Mới và nóng
- Câu chuyện thế giới
- Siêu thị cuộc sống
- Đêm Sài Gòn
- Bệ phóng tài năng
- Let's Music – Âm nhạc tương tác
- TV Champion
- Võ đài chiến thắng
- MAX Muay Thái
- Đấu trường bò - The Battle (The Cow Fight)
- Tần số âm nhạc
- Thai FIGHT
- Trò chơi truyền hình xuyên Quốc gia – The Biggest Game Show in the World
- Người Việt Nam chinh phục đỉnh Everest
- Xổ số Kiến thiết Miền Nam
- Xổ số Kiến thiết Miền Bắc
- Sự cố bất ngờ - Kadeedad (คดีเด็ด)
- Hãy nghe họ nói
- Thế giới trong mắt trẻ thơ
- Đêm của sao
- Nhiệt kế giải trí
- Thế giới trẻ
- Cùng là tỷ phú
- Phóng sự thực tế
- Sắc màu giải trí
- Việt Nam Online (phát lại từ VTC1)
- Ngược dòng thời gian
- Đếm ngược AEC
- Chuyện lý chuyện tình
- Nước sạch cho em
- Khi trái bóng lăn
- Nhịp cầu ước mơ
- Thế giới phụ nữ
- Chuyện phái đẹp
- Let's phim Việt
- Luật đời vay trả
- Gia đình yêu thương
- Mai Vàng kết nối
- Những mảnh ghép cuộc đời
- Xe và thể thao
- Người tập sự châu Á – The Apprentice
- U-League
- Lục lạc vàng
- Sống xanh
- Đồng đội 4 chân
- Vọng cổ du ca
- Khúc quân hành mùa hè xanh
- Nhiếp ảnh tranh tài – Photo Face Off
- Những điều bí ẩn
- Người nổi tiếng
- Đẹp cùng Perfect Call
- Let's Viet News
- Let's Viet Talk
- Hành trình đỏ
- Chinh phục sa mạc
- Mái ấm PNJ
- Mẹo vặt cuối tuần

=== VTC ===
- Cà phê ngày mới
- Tọa đàm
- Phim truyện
- Nói về cuộc sống
- Phóng sự
- Xổ số kiến thiết miền Bắc (phát trực tiếp tại Hà Nội)
- Chuyện thế giới
- Giờ thứ 9
- Khai phá vẻ đẹp của bạn
- 22+ II
- 360 độ Showbiz
- Alo bác sĩ đây
- V Music Show
- Sách và cuộc sống
- Về chốn linh thiêng

== VTC10 ==
=== IMusic ===
- IMusic Việt Nam
- Imusic Quốc tế
- Imusic Top Hits
- Imusic Shows
- IStock

=== VSky ===
- Chương trình tổng hợp
- Phim truyện

=== Netviet + VTC ===
- Open Vietnam
  - Open Vietnam: Sharing Vietnam
  - Open Vietnam: Việt Nam hội nhập và phát triển bền vững
- Việt Nam ngày nay
- Việt Nam biển bạc
- Vietnam Journal
- Sóng nhạc trẻ
- Người xa quê
- Làng nghề
- Bầu trời bé thơ
- Nhịp cầu Việt Mỹ
- Người Việt trẻ
- Tour de Vietnam
- Next Việt Model
- Focus in Vietnam
- Nhịp cầu NetViet
- Nhịp cầu quê hương
- NetViet Stories
- Những miền quê Việt
- Tour de Vietnam
- Sống ở Việt Nam
- Vẻ đẹp tự nhiên
- Mỗi tuần một người đẹp
- Phong cách của các sao
- Cầu vồng âm nhạc
- Talk chủ nhật
- Đánh thức vị giác
- Thời trang bốn mùa
- Văn hóa Việt
- Hành trình tri thức Việt
- Kết nối thương hiệu Việt
- Việt Nam và thế giới
- Phim truyện
- Di sản văn hóa
- Văn hóa ẩm thực Việt
- Top Vietnam
- Ngon và lành
- Bản tin tối
- Nhịp cầu giao thương
- Người Việt năm châu
- Việt Nam hội nhập
- Việt Nam góc nhìn của bạn
- Một ngày làm người Việt
- Tiềm năng Việt Nam
- Dạy Tiếng Việt cơ bản
- Người Việt bốn phương
- Văn hoá ẩm thực
- Đường đến thành công
- Ấn tượng Việt Nam
- Góc cuộc sống
- Nhịp sống mới
- Phim tài liệu
- Khám phá Việt Nam
- Bản tin tiếng Anh
- Nhịp sống trẻ
- Góc nhìn nhà đầu tư
- Đường tới thành Rome
- Lịch sử Việt Nam
- Tiếng Việt
- Gameshow
  - Trúc xanh
  - Mã số bí mật
- Gia đình Việt
- Nhịp sống mới
- Ẩm thực cuối tuần
- Tiêu điểm thị trường
- Những điều kỳ thú tại Hàn Quốc
- Việt Nam đất nước con người
- Best in Korea
- Mỗi ngày một làn điệu
- Cafe tối
- Bệ phóng âm nhạc

== VTC11 ==
- Phim hoạt hình
- Ai thông minh hơn
- Nhìn hình đoán chữ
- Music 4 kids
- Đấu giá 1000
- Tôi yêu nhà tôi
- Game tương tác
- Nào mình cùng đi
- Dạy Tiếng Việt cơ bản
- Thi tài cùng họa sĩ Đốm
- Bầu trời bé thơ
- Bé yêu kể chuyện cổ tích
- Ella chào Việt Nam
- Một ngày của PoPoDoo
- Đoàn tàu kỳ diệu
- Em yêu biển đảo quê hương
- Những que diêm thông minh
- Hát cùng họa mi
- Kids&Family news
- Bàn tay có phép lạ
- Bé yêu học hát
- Đoán giá đúng
- Quà tặng âm nhạc
- KidsTV tương tác
- Chiếc xe âm nhạc
- Happy Birthday
- Chúng em làm chiến sĩ
- Gặp gỡ cuối năm
- Nào mình cùng đi
- Thì ra là thế
- Nhí tài năng
- Ngại gì không nói
- Thứ sáu cùng AU
- Sách hay của bé
- Fun with English
- Theo bước con yêu
- Ống kính biết tuốt
- Đôi tay xinh
- Ảo thuật cùng J
- Khu vườn trí tuệ
- Bàn tròn nhí
- Thế giới diệu kỳ – C’est pas sorcier
- Vòng quay lịch sử
- Vừng ơi mở ra
- Những câu chuyện cô tiên xanh
- Vui học Toán
- Kể chuyện danh nhân thế giới
- Ống kính biết tuốt
- Đuổi hình bắt chữ
- Nhìn hình bắt chữ
- Thử thách rừng xanh
- Hoạt hình Jetix
- Những nốt nhạc ngộ nghĩnh
- Bước khởi đầu cho nhà vô địch
- Chúng em làm chiến sĩ
- Sữa học đường
- Tớ làm truyền hình
- Họa sĩ tí hon
- Hát cùng hoạ mi
- Bàn tròn nhí
- Mặt trời bé con
- Công viên vui vẻ
- Câu đố dân gian
- Thi tài tiếng Anh
- Cùng bé yêu tỏa sáng
- Bí ẩn những ô số
- Hộp quà bí ẩn

=== VTC ===
- Phim hoạt hình
- Lớp học không khoảng cách

== VTC12 ==
- Phát lại chương trình của VTC

=== Alo Homeshopping ===
- Chương trình mua sắm

=== SETV ===
- Ca nhạc

=== VTCK, K2V ===
- BTOB – Những chàng trai hoàn hảo
- Ăn kiêng cùng người nổi tiếng
- Đại nhạc hội Busan
- Kpop Ranking
- Đẹp như sao Hàn
- Nhà có khách
- Thử đi rồi biết
- Đột nhập trường học
- Ẩm thực cho Hội độc thân
- Thách thức siêu đầu bếp

== VTC13 ==
=== iTV ===
- Admin's Playlist
- Beat Up
- Ca nhạc quốc tế
- Ca nhạc Việt Nam
- Bản tin Ốc sên
- Chocolate iMusic
- Ekip 3i (iMusic – iDea – iDol -)
- Ekip 3i+
- Lovely Alphabet
- iChat
- iCover
- iGame
- i$
- iFlim
- ILove Ballads
- iMusic 1 in 3
- iMusic Top Hits (Việt Nam/Quốc tế)
- iMusic Update (Việt Nam/Quốc tế, tiền thân của iTV Now)
- iRing Top Hits
- iTV Now (Việt Nam/Quốc tế)
- iTV Rapnews
- iTV Remix
- iTV Fanmade
- iMusic Việt Nam
- iMusic Quốc tế
- Music Face
- Sao trên iTV
- V-pop Album

=== VTC13 4K (VOV) ===
- Top Ring Tunes
- iMusic Radio cuối tuần
- Giờ cao điểm
- Thông tin, thống kê về diễn biến đại dịch COVID-19
- Chứng khoán
- Thời sự sáng VOV1
- Khám phá tự nhiên – xã hội
- Âm nhạc và cuộc sống

== VTC14 ==
- Hồ sơ X
- Tôi và sự kiện
- Khoảnh khắc hiểm nguy
- Phim cuối tuần
- Môi trường & sức khỏe
- Nhật ký cuộc sống
- Bản tin Thời tiết
- Thời tiết Đô thị
- Thời tiết cuối ngày
- Thời tiết biển
- Thời tiết Nông vụ
- Thời tiết Du lịch
- Cuộc sống 24H
- Giao thông an toàn
- Góc nhìn khán giả
- Góc nhìn cuộc sống
- Chào Buổi tối
- Thế giới 7 ngày
- Chuyện đông chuyện tây
- Môi trường và sức khỏe
- Ngon và lành
- Nhà mát
- Cuộc chiến ung thư
- Sống chung với lũ
- Biển bạc
- Biển đảo Việt Nam
- Nhịp sống đỏ
- 114
- 115
- 4 Tại chỗ
- Việt Nam xanh
- Nhiệt kế thị trường
- Tri thức người xưa
- Thiên nhiên nổi giận
- Thiên nhiên Việt Nam
- Hành tinh xanh
- Hiểm họa quanh ta
- Trái đất trong tay em
- Thế giới xe xanh
- Tình huống nguy hiểm - Thử thách khắc nghiệt
- Cận cảnh
- Thử thách khắc nghiệt
- Chùa Việt Nam
- Dòng chảy cuộc sống
- Biển đảo Việt Nam
- Cùng toàn dân phòng cháy chữa cháy
- Năng lượng hiệu quả
- Phong thủy và cuộc sống

== VTC16 ==
- Hiệu suất vàng
- Hỏi biết trên đồng
- Tổng đài nông nghiệp
- Sửc khỏe sinh sản
- Hành trình rẻo cao
- Khuyến nông
- Đối thoại chính sách tam nông
- Tam nông
- Dự án thăm vườn
- Cuộc sống nhà nông
- Nhất nghệ tinh
- Khuyến nông Hà Nội
- Người làng ra phố
- Văn hóa nông thôn
- Nông dân anh là ai
- Tre xanh
- Chuyện của làng
- Đất Phương Nam
- Chuyện rẻo cao
- Luật về làng
- Dự án thăm vườn
- Sức khỏe vàng
- Hỏi bác sĩ chuyên khoa
- Tư vấn sức khỏe
- Nhà nông làm giàu
- Khoa học nông nghiệp
- Sức khỏe nhà nông
- Thời tiết Biển & Ngư trường
- Con đường làm giàu
- Thị trường Nông sản trong tuần
- Nông thôn xanh
- Hướng nghiệp nhà nông
- Thư khán giả
- Chuyện của làng
- Đọc báo giúp nhà nông
- Thời sự nông thôn
- Nông thôn chuyển động
- Nông nghiệp 24h
- Khởi nghiệp
- Hãy hỏi để biết
- Từ nông thôn nhìn ra thế giới
- Sao thần nông
- Mách nhỏ nhà nông
- Nông thôn mới
- Nhà nông tin dùng
- Thị trường nông sản
- Cùng nông dân hội nhập
- Tư vấn nông nghiệp trực tuyến
- Cùng nông dân ra đồng
- Bản tin 3 sạch
- Mách nhỏ nhà nông
- Thuốc nam cho người Việt
- Chuyện bàn trà
- Chuyện của làng
- Chúng ta đang ăn gì
- Hỏi đáp trong ngày
- Thị trường nông sản cuối tuần
- Nông sản cuối tuần
- Bà con ơi!
- Sắc màu cuộc sống
- Lá lành đùm lá rách
- Sách cho nông dân
- Văn bản chính sách pháp luật mới về Nông nghiệp - Nông thôn
- Bản tin chính sách, việc làm cho nông thôn
- Nông thôn mới
- Chuyện trong xóm ngoài làng
- Trang chăn nuôi
- Chuyện của làng
- Điểm báo
- Bản tin thị trường nông sản
- Cười
- Hướng nghiệp nhà nông
- Bản tin thời sự nông thôn
- Nông nghiệp và công nghiệp hóa
- Trang thủy sản
- Trả lời thư khán giả
- Giữ gìn các làn điệu dân ca
- Trang cây trồng
- Tổng hợp tin tức trong ngày
- Bạn của đất
- Thương hiệu nhà nông
- Phim tài liệu nông thôn
- Đưa thông tin về cơ sở
- Dự báo ngư trường
- Dự báo duyên hải
- Nông thôn và biến đổi khí hậu
- Mách nghề nông nghiệp
- Thời tiết nông vụ
- Hài
- Nông lịch và thời tiết
- Nông vụ và thời tiết
- Nông vụ và thời tiết - Duyên hải
- Nông vụ và thời tiết - Thời tiết nông vụ
- Dân ca và nhạc cổ truyền
- Nông vụ và thời tiết - ngư trường
- Họ đã sản xuất như thế nào?
- Tìm về với dân ca
- Bếp hồng
- Hợp tác xã
- Nông nghiệp 24h

== Defunct Channels ==
=== VTC HD1 & HDVIP1 ===
- Chân dung âm nhạc
- Hồ sơ văn hóa Việt
- Music Faces
- Nét Hà thành
- Chân dung số 6
- Phong & Thủy
- Phim tài liệu
- Thế giới động vật
- Vip Talk
- Chuyện ngôi sao
- TV 24h
- Cô ấy đẹp
- Phong cách đàn ông
- Sao và xe
- 5 sao

=== VTC HD2 & HDVIP 2 ===
- Phim truyện
- Tường thuật bóng đá

=== VTC HD3 & HDVIP 3 ===
- Sành điệu
- Xa lộ âm nhạc
- Không gian sống
- Tạp chí tuổi teen
- Đẹp cùng bạn
- Gửi lời yêu thương
- Gương mặt trang bìa

=== VTC HD Thể thao ===
- Tạp chí thể thao
- Tường thuật thể thao
- Chân dung danh thủ
- Tạp chí các môn thể thao dưới nước
- Tạp chí điền kinh quốc tế
- Tạp chí thế giới thể dục dụng cụ

=== VTC HD M&D ===
- Chương trình tổng hợp

=== VTC HD1 4K ===
- Khám phá thế giới
- Hòa nhạc thính phòng

== Other ==
=== New Year programs ===
- Hội xuân văn nghệ sĩ
- Xuân phát tài
- Táo quân
- Trang thơ xuân
- Cầu truyền hình đặc biệt chào xuân
- Âm nhạc và thời trang
- 10 sự kiện nổi bật
- Những sự kiện văn hóa nổi bật
- Bản tin đặc biệt
- Dự đoán phong thủy năm mới
- Diễn xướng hầu đồng
- Khoảnh khắc giao thừa
- Việt Nam 24h

=== Sports event ===
- Nhật ký Seagames/Asiad/Olympic/Copa America/Euro/World Cup/King's Cup
- Bình luận bóng đá
- Toàn cảnh Seagames/Euro/World Cup/Olympic...

== See also ==
- List of programme broadcast by Vietnam Television paytv
- List of programmes broadcast by Hanoi Radio Television
- List of programmes broadcast by THVL
