= Vietnam Multimedia Corporation =

Vietnamese multimedia corporation

- Native name: Tổng công ty Truyền thông đa phương tiện VTC
- Type: State-owned company Limited liability company
- Industry: Telecommunications Multimedia
- Founded: February 12, 1988; 38 years ago
- Owner: Ministry of Information and Communications

Vietnam Multimedia Corporation VTC (Vietnamese: Tổng công ty Truyền thông đa phương tiện VTC) is a state-owned enterprise in Vietnam focused on multimedia services. Its offerings include cloud storage, finance, telecommunications, and online games. One of its ventures was the VTC Digital Television which they ran from 2004 until 2013 when it was taken over by the Voice of Vietnam and repurposed as VOV's television network, until January 15, 2025 when the network was shut down.

== Subsidiary companies ==
Subsidiary companies include:

- VTC Mobile
- VTC Digicom
- VTC Digital Television
- VTC Technology and Digital Content Company - VTC Intecom
- Communications Corporation VTC.
- Corporate Solutions Limited, a member of VTC communications technology
- Company Limited, a member of Communications VTC Multimedia Central
- Company Limited, a member of Communications South VTC Multimedia
- Company Television Media Development (CTC)
- Trading Corporation VTC (communications equipment)
- Joint Stock Company VTC (electronic media)
- Electronics Corporation and Vietnam Cable Television
- Service Corporation (international cooperation)
- Communications Corporation Friendship
- VTC School of Communication
- VTC Studio (established February 2010)
- VTC Academy

== Online games ==
- Africa Team: Masang Soft (6 May 2006).
- Audition Online: T3 Entertainment and Yedang Online (8 May 2006). In September 2009, VTC and VinaGame disputed the right to issue the game. This triggered the development of Game Gate.
- Cross-fire and MMOFPS Special Force of the FPT (SF); Sudden Attack (SA); the VinaGame; Cross Fire (CF), the VTC game. CF is rated the best of the three games with the highest number of players.
- FIFA Online 2 (FIFA 1 was commissioned online in Indonesia).
- Atlantica Online, Free MMORPG world's best, 2008.
- Kart Rider (removed from sale July 2010).

== VTC Studio online games ==
- Squad: a 3-D first-person shooting game (MMOFPS), built on the game engine, Gamebryo Lightspeed, from Emergent. This is a casual game, presented on a 3D platform and themed with dark navy.
- Generation 3: built on the Microsoft Silverlight platform, tells the story of a make-believe European Middle Ages continent, Okiast, which has three countries, Kalmar, Dargard and Norwales. The players act as military leaders who rise up against corruption in order to untie the lands.
- Colours of Ocean: a free online social growth game for young people.
- Showbiz: a free social game for music lovers.
- Tour 247: a free social game for lovers of tour management.

== Other productions ==
VTC produces News as newspapers, news programs, TV Journal and online TV; Mobile service loadable images and ringtones; EBank, an online payment portal; Mobile TV and Interactive television.
