= VTC Digital Television =

Vietnamese television network

- Type: Television network
- Branding: VTC
- Country: Vietnam
- Availability: Worldwide
- Founded: 19 August 2004; 22 years ago in Hanoi, Vietnam by Vietnam Multimedia Corporation
- Headquarters: Hanoi, Vietnam
- Owner: Vietnam Multimedia Corporation (2004–2013); Ministry of Information and Communications (2014–2015); Voice of Vietnam (2015–2025)
- Key people: Trần Đức Thành (Managing Director); Nguyễn Văn Bình (Deputy Director); Lương Minh Đức (Deputy Director)
- Dissolved: 15 January 2025; 19 months ago (after 20 years, 149 days)
- Picture format: 1080p 16:9 aspect ratio (HDTV) (downscaled to letterboxed 720p for SDTVs); 2160p 16:9 aspect ratio (UHDTV)
- Official website: https://vtc.gov.vn/
- Language: Vietnamese

VTC Digital Television Network (Vietnamese: Đài Truyền hình Kỹ thuật số VTC), or Vietnam Digital Television Network (Vietnamese: Đài Truyền hình Kỹ thuật số Việt Nam) was a Vietnamese television network owned by the Voice of Vietnam. Launched on 19 August 2004, it is recognised as the second national television network in Vietnam and the first to utilise a digital terrestrial network for broadcasts.

VTC Digital Television was operated-and-owned by the Vietnam Multimedia Corporation from its founding day until January 1, 2014, when its management was shifted to the Ministry of Information and Communications. On 2 June 2015, it became part of VOV's multimedia services.

VTC ran 13 channels, with most channels in 1080p HDTV.

On 14 January 2025, the Voice of Vietnam confirmed it would cease airing all VTC channels the next day, following a government decision to end VTC Digital Television's operations and hand over its duties to Vietnam Television.

== History ==
On 1 July 2001, the Vietnam Television Technology Investment and Development Company conducted a trial broadcast of 8 domestic and international television programs on UHF channel 26, based on the DVB-T digital terrestrial television platform. This was a significant milestone for the government to use as a basis for formulating the strategy to develop Vietnam's television industry with advanced digital technology according to the "Digitalization of Terrestrial Broadcasting by 2020" project. The person who laid the foundation for VTC's digital television development was Dr. Thái Minh Tần, former Chairman of the Board of Directors and former General Director of the VTC Multimedia Corporation.

On 19 August 2004, in order to manage and control the content of international programs, the Digital Television Editorial Board was established with an editorial team of nearly 50 people.

On 4 January 2006, according to Decision No. 01/2006/QĐ-BBCVT of the Ministry of Post and Telecommunications (now the Ministry of Information and Communications), the Vietnam Television Technology Investment and Development Company was reorganized into the VTC Multimedia Corporation (still referred to as VTC), expanding its business activities. At the same time, the Digital Television Editorial Board was reorganized into VTC Digital Television based on the merger of the Digital Television Editorial Board, the Digital Terrestrial Television Center, and several other units under the company. From this point forward, the station became a member unit under VTC Corporation.

On 7 July 2008, the online newspaper VTC News was officially established.

By the end of 2008, VTC Digital Television launched high-definition (HD) digital television services, including broadcasting three purely Vietnamese channels and five international channels in high-definition television format (HDTV).

From 1 January 2014, VTC officially separated from VTC Corporation and became an administrative unit under the Ministry of Information and Communications, according to Decree 132/2013/NĐ-CP dated 16 October 2013, of the Government.

At the end of 2014, in the context of being assigned by the National Assembly Office to launch a specialized television channel for the National Assembly, the Voice of Vietnam (VOV) proposed merging VTC Digital Television into VOV to mobilize resources for launching the Vietnam Parliament TV. On 2 June 2015, VTC Digital Television officially merged into VOV, becoming a part of the national media organization.

From 9 June 2017, VTC Digital Television began testing 4K ultra-high-definition television broadcasts on the DVB-T2 network in the capital city of Hanoi. From June 21 of the same year, VTC launched free broadcasts of several 4K standard programs on the DVB-T2 terrestrial digital television system in other provinces and cities.

Beginning on 1 January 2018, VTC introduced a new brand identity across all activities and broadcasting channels of the network.

On 24 April 2018, VTC officially launched the VTC Now multimedia content distribution system.

On 00:00, 15 January 2025 (Indochina Time), all VTC channels, from VTC1 to VTC16, were shut down, ending its 20-year lifespan. The mass shutdown was due to a cost-cutting plan without a prior roadmap that ended up retrenching hundreds of staff members. The goal is to make VTV the only national network, excluding the regional television stations.

== Channels ==
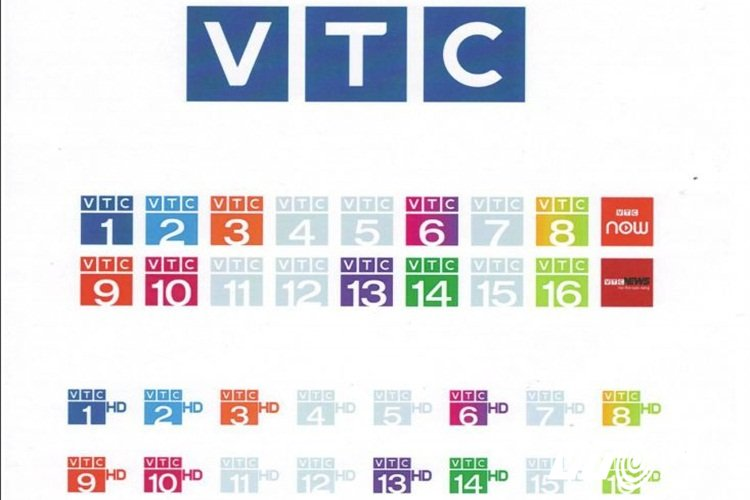
Logo designs of the VTC channels

- VTC1

The primary channel of VTC Television, launched on 19 August 2004. First derived as general entertainment, cultural and social-oriented channel, it was later chosen by the Vietnamese government to be one of twelve must-carry informative channels by all TV providers in Vietnam. From that time forward, VTC1 began spending most of its airtime devoted to news and socio-political programmes. It also broadcast entertainment, documentaries, films and several sport programmes.

- VTC2

Home to scientific, technology and digital media programmes, since 2008. Launched on 19 August 2005, it was first derived to sports and entertainment programmes. April 2016, the slogan of VTC2 "Let's call VTC2 #kenh2" co-operated with VTC Digital Television and Ministry of Transport. In a period between 1 November 2019 to 16 August 2020, VTC2 co-operated with Reidius Media to broadcast its own programmes.

- VTC3

Sports and entertainment-oriented programmes. Launched on 2 November 2006, it is the second domestic-based, sports-oriented channel in the Vietnamese subscription television scene. From 2017, VTC3 began to broadcast entertainment contents. The channel has been co-operated twice, first from 17 June – 27 October 2019 with AVG Television, then from 15 June 2020 to 31 May 2021 with Vietnam Television's subscription provider VTVCab and NEXT Media JSC. The channel is currently airing repeats from other channels, along with a sport bulletin from VTC Now social platform.

- VTC4

The first and only fashion-oriented channel in Vietnam, launched on 31 March 2007. From 1 January 2010, VTC4 was relaunched as a family-oriented channel, co-operated with Yeah1 Network, owned by YEG Media Company. The channel was axed on 1 April 2020, and VTC4 is currently airing reruns of its previous contents.

- VTC5

General entertainment channel, first launched on 17 July 2007 as technology and media channel. This content had been switched to VTC2 from 2008, and from this forward VTC5 had been an socialization synthesis channel between 2008 - 2018. From 2018, VTC5 is currently owned by Saigontourist Cable Television, one of Vietnam Television's pay television provider joint ventures, and airing rerun programmes from this network.

- VTC6

Home to specialist programming for Northern Region, including news, economy, documentaries, dramas and interest programme. Launched on 3 January 2007, its original content was feature films.

- VTC7

Home to more entertainment programming, including comedy, documentaries, dramas, children's programming, as well as imported programmes from other countries, particularly Asian countries such as India or the Philippines. Co-operated with IMC Group since 2008.

- VTC8

Specialist programming for Southern Region audience; also home to national futsal league and educational programs since mid-2021. Launched on 15 March 2009, it was originally the second feed for VITV, a financial channel operated by VIT Corporation.

- VTC9

First launched on 25 July 2008 for the Olympic Games, it was later relaunched as an infotainment channel on 27 September of the same year with Lasta Multimedia Company as joint venture agency. On 1 January 2018, the channel was return to VTC as a family-oriented channel with legacy contents from previous incarnation.

- VTC10

An international channel officially launched in 1 August 2008, offering a best-of package of programming to Vietnamese worldwide with alternative branding NETVIET. In 2012, the channel was one of the must-be-carried informative channels by all TV providers in Vietnam, but dropped soon after.

- VTC11

Children's programming, with archive television repeats in majority.

- VTC12

Niche programming from South Korea, with South Korean mainstream entertainment, comedy, drama, documentaries, and more. First launched on 1 January 2010 as a teleshopping channel, it had gone dark from 1 August 2018 to 1 June 2019. The channel finally went off-air since mid-2024.

- VTC13

On-air experimentally in 28 October 2007, it was officially launched on 1 August 2008 as an interactive music channel. In 2017, the contents of VTC13 became independent with its original owner, Vietnam Multimedia Corporation. Until the end of 2020, as the interactive music content is no longer on air, VTC Television finally dedicated VTC13 as a generalist channel with 4K resolution. Between the year of 2021 and 2023, VTC13 spends all of its broadcast times to simulcast with VOV1 during early morning, VOV Transportation during daytime and drivetime, along with UHDTV-standard contents, music videos and COVID-19 pandemic information at midnight. Along with VTC12, the channel has gone off the air since the year of 2024.

- VTC14

One of VTC Television's primary informative channel besides VTC1, VTC10 and VTC16, broadcasting programme about weather and natural disasters. The channel also broadcast people's livelihood related programmes, including news magazines, documentary, science, health, etc. The channel was one of twelve channels to be must-carry on Vietnamese TV provider in 2012, but later dropped.

- VTC16

Niche programming for rural audience, including specialist newscasts, magazines, documentaries, foreign language films, etc. Considered as one of VTC Television's primary informative channel, VTC16 was also added by the government into the must-carry TV channel list in 2012, but it was dropped soon after.

- VTC HD1: Generalist channel, one of the first 3 Vietnamese-language television channels of VTC broadcast in high definition standards. Since 2014, the channel was renamed VTC1 HD, which is the HD version of VTC1.
- VTC HD2: Movie channel, also one of the first 3 Vietnamese-language television channels of VTC broadcast in high definition standards. The channel was shut down at the beginning of 2016, and on the VTC satellite provider it switched to relaying the Vietnamese feed of the GEM channel until 2018.
- VTC HD3: Music and fashion channel, the third in the first 3 Vietnamese-language television channels of VTC broadcast in high definition standards. The channel went off-air at the beginning of 2016.
- VTC HD Sports: On air since 2008 under the name VTC HD4, the channel was an upscaled version of the Asian ESPN channel. From 2011, it was relaunched under the name VTC HD Sports. Since 2012, VTC HD Sports become the HD version of VTC3 channel. There has been a second feed of ESPN HD on VTC HD service, named VTC HD VIP2.
- VTC HD5: relay feed of National Geographic HD channel, broadcast exclusively on VTC HD satellite digital television system in the years 2009–2012.
- VTC HD6: relay feed of Fashion One HD channel, broadcast exclusively on the VTC HD digital satellite television system between 2009 and 2012.
- VTC HD7: relay feed of CCTV-HD, broadcast exclusively on VTC HD satellite digital television system in the years 2009–2012. Previously, this was the service information channel of the VTC HD service.
- VTC HD9: Synthesis channel, dedicated to live the English Premier League together with VTC3 and VTC HD1. The channel was shut down after VTC HD stopped broadcasting on Asiasat 5 satellite.
- VTC HD VIP1: Launched on 2010, its content shares similarities to the VTC HD1 channel. The channel broadcast exclusively on the HD VIP channel package of VTC HD satellite digital television system until 2011.
- VTC HD VIP3: Launched on 2010, this channel relayed the HBO HD channel and broadcast exclusively on HD VIP channel package of VTC HD satellite digital television system until 2011.
- VTC HD VIP4: Broadcast exclusively on HD VIP channel package of VTC HD satellite digital television system from 2010 to 2011, it relayed stream of Star Movies HD channel

== Other services ==
=== VTC News ===
Launched on 7 July 2008, it was one of the most-viewed news sites in Vietnam. Since 2015, when its main operator - VTC TV Network - was transferred to the VOV, it became one of two main online news sites of VOV media network.

=== VTC Now ===
Multimedia application, developed by VTC since 2018. It also operated a YouTube multi-channel network of its own.

== See also ==
- Cinema of Vietnam
- Culture of Vietnam
- Digital television in Vietnam
- List of programmes broadcast by VTC
- Media of Vietnam
- Telecommunications in Vietnam
- Television and mass media in Vietnam
