= List of programmes broadcast by Vietnam Television paytv =

List of TV programs broadcast by paytv

== VTVCab ==
=== ON Vie Giải Trí ===
==== VCTV1 ====
- Bản tin nối mạng (thay cho Tiêu điểm 5-3-2-1)
- Buôn chuyện
- Ca nhạc quốc tế
- Cẩm nang đẹp
- Chọn sách cùng bạn
- Chuyến đi cuối tuần
- Chuyện đời thường
- Chuyện riêng chuyện chung
- Cuộc sống bốn phương
- Du học và việc làm
- Đất Việt quê tôi
- Đời thường
- Hành trang du học
- Hành trình khám phá
- Hoạt hình
- Hương vị cuộc sống
- Màn ảnh sân khấu
- Mỗi tuần một chuyến đi
- Món ngon nhớ lâu
- Người của công chúng
- Người Việt trẻ (thay thế Người của công chúng, phát sóng từ 2010)
- Nhịp điệu giải trí (thay cho Tiêu điểm 5-3-2-1)
- Nhịp điệu thời trang
- Phong cách
- Quán âm nhạc
- Tạp chí 7/1 (thay cho Tiêu điểm 5-3-2-1)
- Thế giới nghệ thuật
- Thời sự 19h (tiếp sóng VTV1)
- Tiêu điểm 5-3-2-1
- Võ lâm tranh bá

==== Fansipan TV ====
- 360 độ âm nhạc
- Cafe với người nổi tiếng
- Chuyện đàn ông
- Đẹp Fashion show
- Không thể không đẹp
- Làm đẹp
- Những sắc màu nhà Việt
- Nói ra đừng sợ
- Phong cách nữ hoàng
- Tư vấn nội thất

==== VIE Giải Trí (Giải Trí TV) ====
- 2 ngày 1 đêm
- Ai là số 1
- Bí mật căn phòng
- Cả nhà cùng cười
- Các chương trình gameshow của Đông Tây Promotion
- Châu Úc xinh đẹp
- Chị ơi đi Hàn Quốc
- Cuộc sống vui khỏe
- Cười đủ kiểu
- Đẹp Fashion Show
- Đêm của sao
- Đưa em về nhà
- Giây phút thảm họa
- Hậu trường Showbiz
- Khỏe đẹp cùng Yoga
- Muốn ăn phải lăn vào bếp
- Người ấy là ai?
- Nhà có Xine Việt
- Nhanh như chớp nhí
- Rap Việt - The Rapper
- Sao thế giới
- Sao và sự kiện
- Siêu thử thách - Impossible Challenge
- Siêu trí tuệ Việt Nam - The Brain Vietnam (phát sóng 2 mùa)
- Tám thời chín sự
- Thông tin tiêu dùng
- Tiếng Hàn thật vui
- Tin nóng 24 giờ

=== ON Phim Việt ===
- Chuyện của sao
- Góc thư giãn
- Không gian đẹp
- Nhà của sao
- Nhịp cầu sức khỏe
- Phim truyện
- Sắc màu cuộc sống
- Siêu sao Phim Việt

=== ON Movies ===
==== VCTV4 - Kênh văn nghệ ====
- Ca nhạc theo yêu cầu
- Dẫn chuyện thiếu nhi
- Dân ca nhạc cổ (phát lại từ VTV)
- Gạch nối tình yêu
- Giao lưu âm nhạc
- Music 4 Me
- Nhạc chuông 360 độ
- Quán âm nhạc (phát lại từ VCTV1)
- Sân khấu (Kịch, cải lương, tuồng, chèo)

==== M4me ====
- Bảng xếp hạng Keeng
- Bình chọn nhạc QT
- Bình chọn nhạc Việt
- Bình chọn tổng hợp
- M - Playlist
- Mạng xã hội truyền hình
- M4me nhạc quốc tế
- M4me nhạc Việt
- M4me Top Idol
- M4me update nhạc quốc tế
- M4me update nhạc Việt
- MV mới – Nhạc Quốc tế
- MV mới – nhạc Việt
- Ngôi sao mùa hè
- Nhạc Dance
- Sắc màu âm nhạc
- Thần tượng của ngày
- Top 10 bình chọn nhạc Quốc tế
- Top 10 bình chọn nhạc Việt
- Top Clan
- Vinh danh thần tượng của ngày
- Vsao Voice
- Vũ hội tình yêu
- VZPlaylist

==== Kênh 17 và Văn hoá ====
- Ánh sáng ngày mai
- Ẩm thực & du lịch
- Danh nhân đất Việt
- Di sản Việt Nam
- Giai điệu cuộc sống
- Góc nhìn Văn hoá
- Hành trang sống
- Hậu trường Showbiz (chuyển sóng từ VTVcab 6)
- Hoàn thiện bản thân
- Hot girl cà phê
- Hồn Việt
- Làm đẹp (chuyển sóng từ VTVcab 6)
- Mái ấm yêu thương
- Nghệ sĩ tháng
- Quán cà phê âm nhạc
- Sắc màu không gian
- Sắc màu văn hóa
- Tạp chí VZ
- Trò chuyện với người nổi tiếng (chuyển sóng từ VTVcab 6)
- Vietnam IQ
- VZ 100 độ (trước là VZPlaylist)
- VZ Hotlist (trước là VZPlaylist)

==== Love ====
- Tò mò showbiz
- Thanh âm diệu kỳ
- Vietnam IQ
- Đối mặt
- Bảng xếp hạng âm nhạc KPOP - Show! Music core
- Nấu ăn cùng sao
- Câu chuyện nghệ thuật
- Thần tượng đến rồi
- Cocktall âm nhạc
- Tour de Vietnam
- Mâm nhà Food club
- Bất ngờ chưa
- Nhà tù thần tượng
- Thử thách cùng thần tượng
- 5 phút biết hết
- Thế giới đó đây

=== ON Echannel ===
==== RealTV ====
- 113 Online
- 1000 cảm xúc Hà Nội
- Bị cười
- Blog âm nhạc
- Cà phê cuối tuần
- Câu hỏi từ cuộc sống ?
- Đi - nhìn và hỏi
- Đi nhớ hỏi
- Funny Zone
- Góc cuộc sống
- Gương mặt Vpop
- Hành trình 2468
- Hành trình phá án
- Hậu trường sự kiện
- Hoàng tử bóng đá
- Hot V Model
- Khám phá ẩm thực
- Không gian trẻ
- Lovebus - Hành trình kết nối những trái tim
- Một ngày một ngày...
- Nếm và nấu
- Người mẫu của bạn
- Nhịp sống mỗi ngày
- Phong cách thời trang
- RealTV Chart
- RealTV Film
- RealTV Stuff
- Sức sống 1 bài ca
- Tác giả là bạn
- Thời sự 19h (tiếp sóng VTV1)
- Thời trang Iris
- Tiếng nói người dân
- Trực tiếp bóng đá

==== E Channel ====
- Bản tin 2418
- E-music
- E-news
- E-phim
- Hành trình khám phá (ADT sản xuất)
- MPlus
- Du lịch kỳ thú
- Hit cover
- Tỏ tình hoàn mỹ
- Biệt đội xả xì trét
- Đông Tây Nam Bắc
- Ca nhạc bolero
- Khám phá thế giới
- Phim VN
- Phim TQ
- Phim TL
- Phim HQ
- Hồn Việt
- Sân khấu truyền thống
- Món ngon mỗi ngày

=== ON O2TV ===
==== VCTV7 (2006-2011) ====
- Phim truyện
- Phim điện ảnh

==== D-Dramas và Vie Dramas ====
- Phim Âu - Mỹ
- Phim Châu Á
- Phim Việt
- Sống cùng D-DRAMAS, nay là Sống cùng Vie Dramas

ON O2TV

- V music
- Music like

==== VTVcab ====
- Alo 115
- Bệnh khó nói
- Các vấn đề y tế
- Camera ON
- Cảnh báo đỏ
- Cảnh báo tội phạm
- Cảnh báo từ cuộc sống
- Chuyện khó nói
- Dấu vết vụ án
- Đầu bếp của những ngôi sao
- Giải mã vụ án
- Giữ cho lá phổi khỏe mạnh
- Hài hại não
- Onedu (Dạy học trên truyền hình)
- On News
- Khỏe để đẹp hơn
- Mâm nhà Food club
- Music Store
- Nhà tôi 3 đời bán thuốc
- Music Like
- Sách và cuộc sống
- Sức khỏe và cuộc sống
- Tuổi vàng
- DJ Star
- Quý ông hoàn mỹ - The Next Gentleman
- V Music
- V Healthy

=== ON Bibi ===
- Bé làm họa sĩ
- Bữa tối của Bòn Bon
- Chơi mà học
- Ngôi nhà của bé
- Ngôi sao BiBi
- Nhảy cùng BiBi
- Phim hoạt hình
- Siêu sao tài năng nhí
- Thế giới ABC
- Trổ tài cùng bé
- Tủ sách Bibi
- Tủ sách của bé
- Vương quốc tại sao
- Xúc xắc lúc lắc
- Xứ sở diệu kì

=== ON InfoTV ===
- 15 phút chứng khoán
- An cư
- Bạn đường
- Bản tin 20h
- Bản tin chứng khoán Info
- Bản tin dịch vụ
- Báo chí góc nhìn
- Bản tin bất động sản
- Bản tin dịch vụ
- Bản tin đấu thầu
- Bản tin kinh tế
- Bản tin sáng cuối tuần
- Bản tin thị trường
- Bản tin Vàng & tiền tệ
- Bản tin xuất nhập khẩu
- Blog tối
- Cà phê sáng
- Chứng khoán ảo
- Dạy Golf trên truyền hình - Khám phá Swing Việt
- Đấu giá ngược
- Đầu tư tài chính cuối tuần
- Địa ốc Info
- Điểm tin tối
- Đừng hoảng sợ
- Hành trình 0 độ
- Info 360
- Khách hàng thông thái
- Khám phá công nghệ
- Khỏe để sống vui
- Kinh tế số
- Ký sự khám phá
- Lên sóng InfoTV
- Lịch sự kiện văn hóa
- Menu Info
- Mua sắm 24/7
- Nhịp sống 24h
- Ống kính Info
- Phổ biến kiến thức chứng khoán
- Phổ biến kiến thức kinh tế
- S+
- Sàn bất động sản & vật liệu xây dựng
- Sàn chứng khoán Info
- Sàn giao dịch BĐS Info
- Sàn Info
- Sắc màu thể thao
- Siêu thị hàng gia dụng
- Siêu thị khuyên mãi
- Siêu thị nhà đất
- Siêu thị ôtô xe máy
- Siêu thị sách
- Siêu thị thời trang
- Siêu thị việc làm
- Tạp chí Info đầu tư
- Tài chính thông minh
- Tạp chí bất động sản
- Tạp chí xuất nhập khẩu
- Tài chính doanh nghiệp
- Tạp chí kinh tế cuối tuần
- Tạp chí tài chính quốc tế
- Thế giới 23 độ 5
- Thế giới có gì
- Thị trường Info
- Thời sự 19h
- Tiêu dùng & thể thao
- Tiêu dùng 365
- Tin tức Info
- Toàn cảnh báo chí thế giới
- Trước giờ mở cửa
- Xe hay
- Câu chuyện âm thanh
- V music
- Music like
- Thư viênl usuk
- Sắc màu âm nhạc
- Nhạc chủ đề

=== ON Cine ===
- Phim truyện

==== O2TV ====
- 9 tháng 10 ngày
- 24h Sống khỏe
- Áo Blouse trắng
- Ăn uống và sống khỏe
- Bác sĩ O2
- Bản tin O2
- Bạn nên biết
- Bác sĩ tại gia
- Bảo vệ gan bằng thảo dược
- Bệnh môi trường
- Bí ẩn đồ uống
- Bí quyết sắc đẹp
- Bí quyết sống khỏe
- Blog trẻ thơ
- Cả nhà phòng bệnh
- Câu chuyện của tôi
- Chị em làm đẹp
- Chính sách y tế & cuộc sống
- Chia sẻ khoảnh khắc cuộc sống - Chuyện đám cưới
- Chia sẻ khoảnh khắc đời người
- Cho răng chắc khỏe
- Chọn sách cùng bạn
- Chuyện bây giờ mới kể
- Chuyện để đùa khó nói
- Chuyện mỗi ngày
- Chuyện mỗi người
- Chuyện ngành Y
- Chuyện nhà Quyềnh
- Chuyện ông Đường
- Con đường thuốc Việt
- Công nghệ Y học & cuộc sống
- Cùng nhau ta giảm cân
- Cuộc sống vẫn tươi đẹp
- Dành cho đôi mắt
- Dance cho cuộc sống
- Dành cho đàn ông
- Dạy nghề
- Dinh dưỡng hợp lý
- Dinh dưỡng từ hoa quả
- Dr Happy
- Dùng thuốc đúng cách
- Đái tháo đường, bạn nên biết
- Đầu bếp tại gia
- Đẹp cùng chuyên gia
- Đi & gặp
- Đọc sách cùng bạn
- Đối thoại với thầy thuốc
- Đông y thế kỷ 21
- Giải mã XY
- Giờ chiến thắng đái tháo đường
- Giờ chiến thắng ung thư
- Giờ dành cho đàn ông
- Giờ dành cho đôi mắt
- Giờ dành cho người đái tháo đường
- Giờ dành cho trái tim
- Giờ hạnh phúc
- Giờ trái tim
- Giờ viêm gan
- Giữ cho lá phổi khỏe mạnh
- Góc nhan sắc
- Góc nhìn O2
- Gỡ rối
- Hành trình tìm ánh sáng
- Hỏi đáp
- Hồ sơ bệnh án
- Hội chẩn
- Huyết áp mỡ máu
- Kết nối vì cuộc sống
- Khám bệnh gì ? Ở đâu ?
- Khởi động cuộc sống
- Ki ốt thông thái
- Lời chào buổi sáng
- Mang âm nhạc đến bệnh viện
- Máu, khởi nguồn sự sống
- Mình là phụ nữ
- Ngôi sao hiến máu
- Nguy cơ từ cuộc sống
- Nhà tôi
- Nhan sắc
- Nhật ký O2
- Những người con biển cả
- Nòi giống Việt
- Nụ cười ban mai
- Nuôi con khôn lớn
- Oxy cho cuốc sống
- Ống kính bệnh viện
- Ống kính O2
- Papa Mama
- Phía sau men say và khói thuốc
- Phim châu Á
- Phim truyện
- Phòng chống mù lòa
- Quà tặng cuộc sống
- Quảng cáo và sự thật
- Sách & cuộc sống
- Sống chung với đái tháo đường
- Sống cùng HIV
- Sống khỏe
- Sống khỏe với đái tháo đường
- Sơ cứu ban đầu
- Sức khỏe 360
- Sự kỳ diệu của thảo dược
- Tạp chí sức khỏe
- Thanh lọc cơ thể
- Thành tựu y học
- Thành tựu y học Việt Nam
- Thông điệp y tế
- Thuốc Nam người Việt
- Thuốc tốt thuốc hay
- Thực đơn O2
- Thực phẩm cho tương lai
- Tôi đi chữa bệnh
- Trà thế kỷ 21
- Tuổi vàng
- Tủ thuốc gia đình
- Từ trang trại đến bàn ăn
- Tư vấn sức khỏe
- Tư vấn sức khỏe qua mạng Vinaphone
- Vắc xin cuốc sống
- Vitamin +
- Vui khỏe cùng sao
- Yoga in Viet Nam

==== Vie Dramas ====
- Sống cùng VIE Dramas
- Phim châu Á

=== VTVCab 11 ===
==== TV Shopping ====
- Chương trình mua sắm (2008-2015)
- Top 5 sản phẩm
- Giờ vàng cuối tuần
- 7 ngày khuyến mãi
- Giờ vàng giá sốc
- Thời điểm vàng mua hàng giá sốc
- Giá sốc cuối năm
- Người nội trợ đảm đang
- Lắng nghe thị trường
- Làm đẹp đón xuân
- Mừng tuổi đầu năm trao quà ngày xuân
- Giỏ quà Tết
- Cuộc sống tiện ích

==== VGS Shop ====
- Chương trình mua sắm

VTV huyndai home shopping

Chương trình mua sắm (05/11/2023-01/01/2024)

=== ON Style TV ===
- 1 ngày cùng phong cách
- 7 nốt nhạc
- 25 phong cách ấn tượng
- Adam vào bếp
- Ai đến hôm nay
- Bản lĩnh đàn ông
- Bàn tròn gia đình
- Bàn tròn Showbiz
- Bắt mạch tình yêu
- Blog phong cách
- Bố ơi, mẹ thích gì ?
- Cẩm nang cười
- Cẩm nang đẹp
- Chat với ngôi sao
- Chuyên mục cười
- Chuyện riêng chuyện chung
- Chuyện Showbiz
- Con đường thời trang
- Công sở kỳ truyện
- Công sở truyền kỳ
- Cuộc sống xanh
- Cuxi Night
- Dr Tin
- Đám cưới trong mơ
- Đàn ông sau 5h
- Đàn ông tỏa sáng
- Đẳng cấp phái mạnh
- Đẳng cấp thương hiệu
- Đẹp 24h
- Đẹp như sao
- Đẹp như nhà sao
- Điểm đến cuối tuần
- Điểm hẹn cuối tuần
- Gia đình Style
- Giá trị yêu thương
- Giấc mơ hạnh phúc
- Giờ vàng mua sắm
- Góc chuyên gia
- Góc làm đẹp
- Hài dân gian
- Hành trình tóc
- Hoa khôi thể thao
- Hương vị cuối tuần
- Hương vị cuộc sống
- Khám phá thương hiệu
- Khỏe đẹp mỗi ngày
- Khoẻ để sống vui
- Khoảnh khắc tình yêu
- Không gian đẹp
- Khúc ngẫu hứng
- Lăng kính cuộc sống
- Mẹ và bé
- Mẹ yêu con
- Món quà tình yêu
- Mỗi tuần một chuyện
- Một ngày một phong cách
- MS box
- Nghệ thuật hoá trang
- Nhà thiết kế thời trang
- Show nghệ thuật khai thác VTVcab
- Nào cùng dự tiệc
- Năng động mỗi sáng
- Nghệ sĩ đường phố
- Người mẫu
- Người Việt hàng Việt
- Nhạc Việt Online
- Nhật ký nữ siêu mập Ruby
- Nhịp cầu sức khỏe
- Phía sau thành công
- Phong cách doanh nhân
- Phong cách sao
- Phong cách số
- Phụ nữ thành công
- Sắc màu 4 phương
- Sắc màu cảm hứng
- Style Chat
- Style công sở
- Style Matching
- Style Music
- Sức sống hàng Việt
- Thế giới đàn ông
- Thế giới vô lăng
- Thời trang áo tắm
- Tiêu dùng cuộc sống
- Tin hay không tin
- Tóc mới
- Top Destination
- Tôi có thể - I Can Do That
- Tôi đẹp tôi thay đổi
- Tôi phong cách
- Tôi và xe
- Trăng mật ngọt ngào
- Tư vấn tiêu dùng
- Vũ điệu trang sức
- Xe tuần qua
- Xe và phong cách
- Xu hướng và sàn diễn
- Yêu con
- V music
- Music like
- "Nhạc chủ đề"

=== ON Kids & Junior ===
Phim hoạt hình

ON HOME SHOPPING

VTV huyndai home shopping

Chương trình mua sắm (2016-nay)

=== VTVCab 14 - VShopping ===
- Chương trình mua sắm (2019 - nay)

==== Lotte Đất Việt Homeshopping (2012 - 2019) ====
- Chương trình mua sắm (2012 - 2018)

VTV huyndai home shopping

Chương trình mua sắm (01/01/2022-16/09/2023)

=== ON Music ===
==== Invest TV ====
- An ninh năng lượng
- An sinh xã hội & đầu tư
- Bán tin Tối
- Bán tin tấc vàng
- Bài học kinh nghiệm
- Bình báo
- Bình luận Invest
- Câu chuyện đầu tư
- Câu chuyện quốc tế
- Chuyển động tài chính
- Chứng khoán Invest
- Công nghệ
- Điểm đến Việt Nam
- Invest 20h
- Khám phá
- Lăng kính chứng khoán
- Let's go
- Made in Vietnam
- Phụ nữ làm kinh tế
- Trực tiếp bóng đá
- Sản xuất, tiêu dùng và thị trường
- Sống đam mê
- Sở hữu trí tuệ
- Sự lựa chọn của nhà đầu tư
- Tấc vàng Invest
- Tấc vàng trong tầm tay
- Thảm đỏ Việt Nam
- Thông tin thương vụ
- Thời sự đầu tư
- Thương hiệu Việt
- Tuổi trẻ với WTO
- Tủ sách doanh nhân
- Văn hóa doanh nhân

==== M Channel ====
- 18h Hot
- Bí ẩn quanh ta
- Trực tiếp bóng đá
- Góc Fitness
- Lửa thử vàng
- M-Movie
- M-Sports
- Nam học
- S&S - Chương trình về sức khỏe tình dục
- Techman
- Thời trang
- Thú chơi
- Xem ngay

==== UM Channel và VTVCab ====
- UM Chart
- Vmusic
- Câu chuyện âm nhạc
- Radio tình yêu
- Ca nhạc (Trữ tình, Bolero, Nhạc trẻ,...)
- Block V-pop
- Block Asia
- Block OST
- Block Retro
- Block nhạc mới
- UM Special
- UM Live Concert
- Music store
- Music like
- Acoustic cover
- Cocktail âm nhạc
- Chanh đa mùi
- DJ star
- Thư ký romeo
- Rẽ phải - Rẽ trái
- Nhạc lyric
- The khang show
- Câu chuyện âm thanh
- Front row
- Ca múa nhạc
- Quý ông hoàn mỹ - The Next Gentleman

=== ON Trending TV ===
==== VCTV17 - Du lịch and Kênh 17 ====
- Cuộc sống bốn phương
- Di sản Việt Nam
- Du lịch 357
- Drama
- Đi là đến
- Đũa tre
- Góc riêng của Sao
- Hành trang sống
- Hành trình khám phá
- Hậu trường Showbiz
- Khám phá tự nhiên
- Ký sự rừng xanh
- Lạ và quen
- Làm đẹp
- Nhịp sống
- Những miền đất lạ
- Phố
- Sang trọng Việt Nam
- Sắc màu không gian
- Trò chuyện với người nổi tiếng
- Việt Nam trong tôi
- Vòng quanh thế giới

==== Yeah1 TV ====
- 5PM - 5 giờ chiều
- Alo Alo (phiên bản 2)
- Anh áo đen
- Bữa cơm của mẹ
- Câu chuyện thời trang
- Cơn bão V-Star
- Đèn xanh cho tình bạn
- Cặp đôi đại chiến
- Hello
- Khỏe và đẹp
- Kpop on Air
- Ký sự rừng xanh
- Lặng nhìn cuộc sống
- Lớp học vui nhộn
- Này bạn, bạn nghĩ sao (phiên bản 2)
- Năng động ngày mới
- Nhịp sống (chuyển sóng từ VTVcab)
- Play
- Rẽ trái, rẽ phải
- Senbatsu Battle
- Thực đơn 1102
- Thư ký của Romeo
- Trạm chờ xe buýt
- Đi cùng Duy
- Thư viện USUK
- Thành phố tôi yêu
- Ống kính
- Hóng chuyện
- Hãy là chính mình
- Hành khách bất ngờ
- Yeah1 Countdown
- Yeah1 On Stage
- Đây chính là nhảy đường phố - Street Dance Vietnam

==== ON Trending TV ====
- Vợ chồng son
- Bạn muốn hẹn hò
- Gõ cửa thăm nhà
- Trăng mặt diệu kỳ
- Các Ông Bố nói gì
- Hóng chuyện
- Dấu chân sinh thái ON3F
- Chuyện mày râu
- Nhạc theo chủ đề
- Sắc màu âm nhạc
- Khi chàng là vợ
- Thư viện USUK
- Amazing road
- Thức tỉnh tâm hồn
- Khám phá Việt Nam cùng Martin Yan

=== ON Vie DRAMAS ===
==== FilmTV ====
- Chiếc hộp điện ảnh

=== ON VFamily ===
- AZ Playlist
- VZ Playlist
- Ánh sáng ngày mai
- Quán cà phê âm nhạc
- Cảnh báo an toàn sống
- Vitamin cho cuộc sống
- Hoàn thiện bản thân
- Trò chuyện với người nổi tiếng
- Quán cà phê âm nhạc
- Thực đơn đỉnh
- Đi là đến
- Hương vị Việt
- Cơm chay cửa Thiền
- Thể thao, sức sống và đam mê
- Sơ cứu ban đầu
- Hát vì yêu
- Về quê
- Cùng em đến trường
- Bạn muốn hẹn hò
- Mẹ chồng nàng dâu
- Gia đình siêu nhộn

=== ON Kids ===
==== SaoTV (29/04/2016 - 31/03/2018) ====
- Phim hoạt hình
- Phim thiếu nhi
- Phim gia đình
- Chuyện kể bé nghe
- Chùm thơ cho bé

Cartoon Kids (1/04/2018 - nay )

- Nhảy cùng bibi

=== ON Life (Love Nature 4K) ===
- OnEdu (phát cùng với VTVcab 7)

== ON Sports Network (by VTVCab) ==
=== ON Sports (VTVCab 3 - ThethaoTV Old name) ===
- 10 phút thể dục
- Arsenal TV
- Arsenal 360
- ATP Tour Uncovered
- Bản tin cuối tuần
- Billiard – Snooker
- Bóng bàn vô địch thế giới của Trung Quốc
- Bóng đá muôn nơi
- Breaking News
- Cafe 24
- Cận cảnh
- Câu chuyện tối thứ 3
- Cầu mây nữ Việt Nam
- Cuồng nhiệt cùng bóng đá
- Cuồng nhiệt cùng thể thao
- Dạy thể thao
- Đặng Phương Nam Show
- Góc khuất
- Football Country
- Futbol Mundial
- Giấc mơ thể thao`
- Huyền thoại Action
- Khai cuộc Bundesliga, Ligue1,....
- Khỏe & đẹp
- Không phải ai cũng biết
- Làng cờ
- Lăn cùng trái bóng
- Mổ băng: Góc chiến thuật
- Mổ băng: Tennis
- Muôn màu thể thao
- Nhà vô địch
- Omni Sport
- ON Sports World
- Phong cách sống
- Phụ nữ với thể thao
- Quần vợt quốc tế
- Sôi động cuối tuần
- Sôi động thể thao
- Tạp chí ATP Tennis
- Tạp chí ATP Tour
- Tạp chí danh thủ
- Tạp chí Golf PGA
- Tạp chí huấn luyện viên vĩ thoại
- Tạp chí Olympic
- Tạp chí Ô tô và thể thao
- Tạp chí Serie A
- Tennis thế giới
- Thể thao & cuộc sống
- Thể thao và thời tiết
- Thể thao +18
- Thể thao bốn phương
- Thể thao cập nhật
- Thể thao ngoài trời
- Thể thao tốc độ
- Thế giới banh nỉ
- Thế giới Golf
- Thế giới Ngoại hạng Anh
- Thế giới thể thao
- Thể thao bốn phương
- Thể thao nghệ thuật
- Thể thao tổng hợp
- Thể thao Việt Nam
- Thích thì thử
- Thời tiết & thể thao
- Toàn cảnh thể thao điện tử
- Toàn cảnh V-league
- Tôi yêu bóng đá
- Tôi yêu thể thao
- Tổng hợp V - League
- Trái bóng tròn
- Tường thuật bóng đá
- Tường thuật thể thao
- V-League World

=== ON Sports+ ===
==== VCTV6/VTVcab 6 - Kênh phổ biến kiến thức ====
- Các vấn đề xã hội
- Các vấn đề giáo dục
- Câu chuyện khoa học
- Công nghệ cuối tuần
- Công nghệ khám phá
- Công nghệ & cuộc sống
- Công nghệ và đời sống
- Chuyến đi cuối tuần (phát lại từ VCTV1)
- Chuyện chung chuyện riêng (phát lại từ VCTV1)
- Cùng nông dân bàn cách làm giàu
- Dạy nghề
- Dạy ngoại ngữ (Anh, Pháp, Trung, Hàn)
- Danh nhân đất Việt
- Dư địa chí truyền hình
- Gìn giữ cho muôn đời sau (phát lại từ VTV2)
- Hành trang du học
- Hành trình khám phá
- Khám phá thế giới
- Khám phá tự nhiên
- Khoa học và cuộc sống (phát lại từ VTV2)
- Kiến thức xã hội
- Kinh tế thương mại
- Kinh tế xã hội
- Làm quen với khoa học
- Những miền đất lạ
- Những sắc màu không gian
- Những sắc màu văn hóa
- Những mảnh ghép cuộc sống
- Phim khoa học
- Phim khoa học công nghệ nước ngoài
- Phim tài liệu khoa học
- Sắc màu văn hóa các dân tộc
- Sức khỏe cho mọi người
- Tạp chí giáo dục (phát lại từ VTV2)
- Thông điệp thời gian
- Thế giới công nghệ
- Tìm hiểu tác phẩm điện ảnh
- Tư vấn mùa thi
- Tư vấn tuyển sinh (trực tiếp cùng VTV2)
- Việt Nam – Đất nước – Con người
- Vòng quanh thế giới
- Y học bốn phương
- Trực tiếp bóng đá

===== Các chương trình phát sóng từ 3/2013: =====
- Góc riêng của Sao
- Hậu trường Showbiz
- Làm đẹp (chuyển từ VCTV1)
- Sắc màu không gian (chuyển từ VCTV1)
- Trò chuyện với người nổi tiếng

==== Hay TV ====
- Bản tin 2418
- Phim Hay
- VZ Hotlist

==== VTVCab, OnSports+ ====
- 3F Pro
- 8 bóng đá
- Bản tin giáo dục
- Bản tin thể thao giải trí
- Bản tin On Sports
- Gõ cửa nhà fan
- Tạp chí giáo dục
- Mổ băng
- Thể dục thể thao cho cuộc sống
- Tường thuật 10 phút
- Tường thuật bóng đá
- Tường thuật thể thao
- Amazing
- Lập trình
- Khoa học diệu kỳ
- On Skills
- On Edu Talk: Tư vấn tuyển sinh
- Khám phá châu Âu
- Luxury Life Style
- Music Like
- Lifestyle+
- Music Store
- Vmusic
- Quý ông hoàn mỹ - The Next Gentleman

=== ON Football (VTVCab 16 - BongdaTV old name) ===
- Gameshow 3F
- Bản tin thế giới
- Bóng đá Việt Nam
- Cuồng nhiệt 24/7
- Cuồng nhiệt cùng bóng đá
- Đại lộ Bundesliga
- Đặng Phương Nam Show
- EPL IN
- Football Mundial
- Góc khuất
- Không phải ai cũng biết
- On Football Focus
- ON TIF
- Nhà vô địch
- Nhận định bóng đá
- Bản tin Nhịp sống thể thao 12h
- Bản tin Thế giới thể thao 6h
- Mổ băng
- Mổ băng - Góc chiến thuật
- Sân cỏ Chủ Nhật
- Siêu kinh điển
- Soccer Skills
- Talkshow bóng đá
- Tạp chí bóng đá
- Thế giới thể thao
- Thể thao cập nhật
- Thể thao Việt Nam
- Thứ 7 cuồng nhiệt
- Tiếp lửa ngoại hạng
- Trái bóng tròn
- Tường thuật bóng đá
- Tường thuật V.League
- The Champion Show-Talk show UEFA Champions League
- V.League Replay

=== ON Sports News (VTVCab 18 - Thethao Tintuc HD old name) ===
- Anh Ngọc & Calcio
- Bản tin On Sports (phát lại từ On Sports+)
- Bình luận thể thao
- Bóng đá sân
- Cà phê đội tuyển
- Đại lộ Bundesliga
- ES La Liga
- Giấc mơ thể thao
- Gương mặt thể thao
- KPACB ON Green
- Laliga World
- Nhà vô địch
- Nhịp sống thể thao
- ON Kết nối
- Phía sau vinh quang
- Tạp chí bóng đá (Ngoại hạng Anh, La Liga)
- Tạp chí quần vợt (ATP 500, ATP 250, Wimbledon)
- Thế giới thể thao
- Thế giới Golf (phát lại từ On Golf)
- Thể thao Việt Nam
- Thời tiết & thể thao
- Tường thuật thể thao
- Tường thuật bóng đá

=== ON Golf (VTVCab 23 - Thethao HD Golf old name) ===
- 3T World
- Bản tin Thế giới Golf
- Dạy Golf trên truyền hình
- Huyền thoại Golf
- Tạp chí Golf Golfing World
- Trực tiếp các giải Golf PGA Tour / European Tour

== SCTV ==
=== SCTV Phim Tổng hợp ===
- Phim truyện

==== SCTV1 ====
- Bói...hát
- Công ty tá hỏa
- Cười đa cảm xúc
- Gặp nhau cuối tuần
- Học viện ngôi sao
- Làng cười cười cả làng
- Phim truyện
- Sống ở Việt Nam
- Nghệ sĩ và cuộc sống
- Trò chuyện cùng nghệ sĩ
- Tám xuyên Việt
- Táo quân ở trọ
- Thách cười
- Thiên thần 1001
- Thư giãn cuối tuần

=== SCTV2 ===
==== YanTV & UNI Channel ====
- 2NE1 TV live worldwide
- 8 văn phòng
- 100 độ Yan
- 360 Hà Nội
- American Best Dance Crew
- Awesome - Vui thỏa thích
- Back To Back
- Bản đồ Yan
- Bản tin giải trí - Wazzup
- Bánh Gato
- Bếp chiến
- BFF - Sát cánh cùng thần tượng
- Bling Bling
- Ca nhạc
- Chất riêng của tôi
- Chỉ có thể là Yan
- Con đường thành công
- Dancing With The City
- Designer Marathon - Chân dung nhà thiết kế
- DJ World
- Đẹp 360
- Đẹp hơn mỗi ngày
- Đi ăn cùng sao
- Điện ảnh trong tầm tay
- Electro
- Fashionista
- Ghế đỏ
- Giờ phim ngắn
- Gương mặt kế tiếp
- Hạt giống âm nhạc
- Hiphop Central
- Hi5
- Hey Yo
- I Love Vpop
- I Want to work for Diddy
- JK Mania
- Không gian ký ức
- Ký ức âm nhạc
- KPOP
- Leo&U
- Love Song
- Lucky 6
- M!Scandal
- M&M
- Màu thời gian
- MIX
- New Beat
- Mộc - Unplugged
- Mối tình đầu
- Một ngày mới
- Một vòng trải nghiệm
- MTV Exit
- Mustang
- Mùa hè trên nông trại khoai tây
- Mùa hè vui nhộn
- Music ATM
- MVs/Zoom
- My exclusive YanTV
- Nhà là để trọ
- New Hits
- New Ring Tunes
- Ngẫu hứng âm nhạc
- Nhòm nhèm
- Ối trời ơi
- Phía sau camera
- Play Me
- Pop Profile
- Rada 123
- Radio 88.8
- Rew
- Revive Funbike
- Rock on Yan
- Sao A-Z
- Sao 24/7
- Sao quân sư
- Sắc màu Việt Nam
- Sẵn sàng khám phá
- Số 6 may mắn
- Star Buzz
- Tạp chí thời trang
- Thần tượng âm nhạc Việt Nam
  - Vui cùng Thần tượng âm nhạc
  - Hành trình đến với thần tượng
- Thực đơn Vpop
- Tích tắc
- Tôi dám hát
- Trổ tài sao
- UDJ
- Ước mơ cùng Yan
- WE10
- We Got Married
- Wide News
- Win10
- Win at Yan
- Video Fashion News
- VJ Show
- VMA Flash
- VPOP+
- X2
- Yan Around - Một vòng trải nghiệm
- Yan Asia
- Yan Break
- Yan Chat
- Yan Cine
- Yan Me
- Yan Live
- Yan Special
- Yan Star - Không ai khác ngoài bạn
- Yan VIP
- Yan Vpop 20
- Yan yêu
- Zoom - Spotlight

==== AMC ====
- Chạy đi chờ chi
- Chạy đi chờ chi mini
- V LIVE Shows
  - V LIVE Shows: Tám đầy chất xám
  - V LIVE Shows: XX Music Show
- SB / MV / AMC PLAY
- Siêu tài năng nhí - Super 10

==== Net Star ====
- Nghìn lẻ 1 chuyện
- Hiểu và thương
- Đặc sản miền sông nước
- Cine Box

TodayTV

- Cười lên nào/Just For Laughs Gags
- Thế giới điện ảnh
- Để bác sĩ lo
- Sống để yêu thương
- Những khúc vọng xưa
- Hành trình bolero
- Chuyện nhà mình
- Tiếp sức hồi sinh
- Món ngon quận mình
- Vũ điệu cuộc sống
- Có Youpy không lo chi
- Phim truyện
- Vietnam Moonlight Fashion
- Bật mí chuyện sao
- Fashion Moon Light

=== SCTV3 ===
==== SaoTV (1/6/2008 - 31/12/2015) & SEETV (1/1/2016 - nay) ====
- Vui nhộn cùng Aston
- Bí mật cơn lốc Ninjago
- Túi ba gang
- Bạn có biết
- Những ngôi sao nhỏ
- Mẹ vắng nhà, ba là siêu nhân (Korea version)
- Ngôi sao nhí
- Rạp chiếu phim mê tít
- Vũ điệu sôi động
- Sinh nhật hồng
- Sinh nhật yêu thương
- Những bàn tay xinh
- Góc sáng tạo
- Phim hoạt hình
- Chiếu phim
- Học vui vui học
- Phim khoa giáo
- Góc gia đình
- Chuyện kể bé nghe
- Chùm thơ cho bé
- Những nốt nhạc xinh
- Bé yêu ngoại ngữ
- "Phòng Nghệ thuật"

=== SCTV4 ===
==== Yeah 1TV ====
- 2!Idol
- 51 Job - Thỏa sức nghề nghiệp
- 1+1=1
- 4 ngày yêu
- 360 độ Yeah
- A2Z
- Alo Alo
- Alo Radio
- Bật mí bí mật sao
- Bí mật hậu trường
- Bí mật teen
- Biệt đội Siêu Xoáy
- BringIt
- Bước nhảy xì tin
- Casting Model
- Câu chuyện âm nhạc
- Chinh phục
- Chinh phục lọ lem
- Chương trình tổng hợp
- Cocktail Âm nhạc
- Cover Hit
- Cơn bão 8
- Du lịch cùng teen
- Đêm ngàn sao
- Điệp vụ tình yêu
- EcoX
- Em yêu Sài Gòn
- Giới trẻ vào bếp
- Hát hay, hay hát
- Hát tự nhiên
- Hậu trường vui nhộn
- Hết ga
- Hiphop Zone
- Hit tôi yêu
- Hot Music
- I - music
- If You Can - Nếu bạn có thể
- I Love K-Pop
- I Love Music
- I-movie
- Jukeon
- K Music
- Kênh thứ 7
- Key Life
- Khoảnh khắc thay đổi số phận
- Leo's Show
- K-Pop Zone
- Mic Rubic
- Mirinda
- Mồ hôi tím
- Music Top 20: Bảng xếp hạng âm nhạc quốc tế
- Nấc thang âm nhạc
- Này bạn, bạn nghĩ sao
- Nhật ký phong cách
- Nhiệt kế trái tim
- Sao Sao
- Sinh nhật Sao
- Style+
- Style & Star
- Style & Star - Xinh cùng sao
- Tám tất tần tật
- Teen Balô
- Teen Diary - Nhật Ký Ô Mai
- Teen Sport - Trẻ, khỏe và đẹp
- Thật & Thách Show
- Thế giới Pha lê
- Tiếng nói Teen
- Tín đồ Shopping
- Tôi làm DJ
- Tổng đài Sao
- Tôi và tuổi teen
- Trước ống kính
- US-UK Music
- Vui cùng Sao
- Y! oh cha cha
- Yeah1 City
- Yeah1 Countdown
- Yeah1 Enter
- Yeah1 fashion - Nhật ký pha lê
- Yeah1 Music
- Yeah1 Photographer
- Yeah1 Shopping
- Yeah1 Star: gương mặt âm nhạc
- Yeah1 Studio

==== STC ====
- Nhịp sống 365

==== GChannel ====
- Phim truyện

==== Let's Viet ====
- Chuyện lý chuyện tình
- Đấu trường bò
- Hội xuân Văn nghệ sĩ
- Let's Cà phê
  - Let's Cà phê: Góc nhân ái
  - Let's Cà phê: Let's Showbiz
- Lục lạc vàng
- MAX Muay Thái
- Nhịp cầu ước mơ
- Phóng sự thực tế
- Sắc màu giải trí
- Siêu thị cuộc sống
- Sống xanh
- Sự cố bất ngờ
- Thai FIGHT
- Thế giới trẻ
- Thế giới trong mắt trẻ thơ
- Trò chơi truyền hình xuyên Quốc gia

==== SCTV ====
- An toàn sống
- Chuyện nóng 24h
- Nhịp sống hôm nay
- Sự cân bằng hoàn hảo
- Phim truyện
- Tạp chí thể thao

=== SCTV5 ===
==== TVS ====
- Chương trình mua sắm (2008-2011)
- Lao động & việc làm
- Siêu thị địa ốc
- Siêu thị khuyến mãi
- Siêu thị nhà sách văn
- Thời trang & làm đẹp
- Ẩm thực Sài Thành

==== SCJ ====
- Chương trình mua sắm (2011 - nay)
- 15 phút vàng

=== SCTV6 ===
==== Sóng Nhạc & SCTV ====
- 24h làm đẹp
- Chat với sao
- Ca nhạc tổng hợp
- Cuộc đua kỳ thú
- Doanh nghiệp & doanh nhân
- Dòng thời gian
- Điểm hẹn cuối tuần
- Đường đến ước mơ
- Đàn ca tài tử Nam Bộ
- Đẹp Fashion
- Giai điệu Phương Nam
- Hương vị ẩm thực
- Hương sắc Việt
- Hành trang du học
- Không gian hoàn hảo
- Khám phá Việt Nam
- Kinh tế hội nhập
- Kỹ năng cuộc sóng
- Không gian âm nhạc
- Lời yêu thương
- Một thoáng hương quê
- Niềm vui bất ngở
- Nhạc nhẹ
- Ống kính SNTV
- Ống kính thời trang
- Phía sau ánh hào quang
- Phong cách teen
- Phát triển thương hiệu
- Sài Gòn cà phê
- Tập chí âm nhạc
- Tạp chí tiêu dùng
- Tạp chí kinh tế
- Tạp chí sống nhạc
- Thị trường mua sắm
- Trò chuyện với nghệ sỹ
- Tác giả & tác phẩm
- Vui Vui Fishing

==== SNTV (IMC) ====
- 3-8
- 360 độ làm đẹp
- Bà con ơi
- Cẩm nang dưới gối
- Chiếc cân may mắn
- Chuyện nhà mình
- Chúng tôi là phụ nữ
- Điểm hẹn cuối tuần
- Hành trang du học
- Hương vị ẩm thực
- Không gian hoàn hảo
- Ống kính thời trang
- Phim truyện
- Thú cưng TV
- Top Việt Nam
- Tư vấn sức khỏe và tiêu dùng
- Vui vui Fishing
- Vươn tới ước mơ

==== Fim360 (Viettel Media) ====
- Fim Trung (Phim Trung Quốc)
- Fim Rạp (Phim Chiếu Rạp)
- Fim Thái (Phim Thái Lan)
- Fim Việt (Phim Việt Nam)
- Fim Hàn (Phim Hàn Quốc)
- 8 Fim (8 Phim)
- Chảo lửa thách đấu - Xgaming
- Mẹ vắng nhà, ba là siêu nhân
- Nhà hát truyền hình
- Thời để nhớ
- Hát vì yêu
- Phim truyện
- Sao nhập ngũ
- Ca nhạc
- Vợ chồng son
- Hành trình 1735+
- Phim giá đời thực

=== SHOWTV (STC & Sàn Diễn 360) ===
- Cẩm nang 365
- Cẩm nang sức khỏe
  - Sống khỏe hơn - Sống lâu hơn
- Tận hưởng cuộc sống
- Di sản văn hóa
- Sàn diễn cuối tuần
- Hiểu đúng bệnh - Chữa đúng cách
- Nhịp sống 365
- Khỏe đẹp cùng nghệ sỹ

=== SCTV8 (VITV) ===
- Hàn thử biểu
- Đối thoại
- Hộp tin Việt Nam
- Tâm chấn
- Dự báo thời tiết
- Chào Việt Nam
- Xây dựng và Bất động sản
- Giờ thứ 9
- Tin mới (9h, 15h, 17h)
- Xuất nhập khẩu
- Bữa sáng doanh nhân
- Năng động châu Á
- Sắc màu muôn phương
- Tiêu điểm
- Bàn tròn doanh nghiệp
- Chuyển động châu Âu
- Vòng xoáy châu Mỹ
- Điểm sóng - Hot Stock
- Điểm sóng
- Luật sư của doanh nghiệp
- Tiêu điểm vàng
- Trên từng kinh tuyến
- Kinh tế toàn cầu
- Startup 360
- Câu chuyện thời trang
- Diễn đàn CEO
- Tiêu điểm kinh tế
- Thế giới sự kiện
- Tạp chí ngân hàng
- Khám phá thương hiệu
- Việt Nam & tiềm năng
- Môi trường kinh doanh
- V Tài chính
- Chứng khoán ngành
- Into Vietnam
- 100° Fashion
- Lăng kính
- Thư viện doanh nhân
- ART World
- Hành trình tri thức
- Thế giới kỳ quan
- Tạp chí Golf
- Sắc màu muôn phương
- Báo chí Kinh tế tuần qua
- Kinh tế tuần qua
- Luật sư doanh nghiệp
- Vietnam - EU Biz
- VITV & More
- Chứng khoán cuối tuần
- Tài chính thuế
- Thể thao tuần qua
- Phim truyện
- Biz Compass
- VITV gặp gỡ

=== SCTV9 ===
- Phim truyện châu Á

=== SCTV11 ===
==== KOD ====
- Âm nhạc theo yêu cầu
- Hát trên truyền hình
- Top Hit

==== TVStar ====
- Giai điệu vàng (phát sóng trên SCTV20)
- Khúc vọng vàng son
- SZ Bolero - Những nốt nhạc ngân
- Thử tài đọc Trailer
- Tình khúc Bolero
- Tôi là ai

=== SCTV12 ===
- Đồng hành cùng Saigontourist
- Nhanh nhanh vào bếp
- Nét ẩm thực Việt
- Sống ở Việt Nam
- Chuyến xe mê ly
- Đố vui động vật
- Tour de Vietnam
- Giới thiệu các điểm du lịch
- Ẩm thực
- Du lịch & khám phá
- Đi tìm món ngon
- Chuyến xe hương sắc vị
- Một ngày trải nghiệm tại The Cillf Resort
- 1001 nơi tôi đến
- Địa lý hay sinh vật
- Khám phá
- Thế giới động vật
- Dinh dưỡng cho người bệnh
- Phóng sự, ký sự
- Mỗi ngày một chuyến
- Chinh phục Tây Bắc
- Món ngon 365
- Du lịch miễn phí
- Hành trình 360 độ
- Điểm hẹn du lịch
- Món ngon đãi tiệc
- Du lịch cùng sao
- Khám phá miền Tây
- Việt Nam đa dạng cuộc sống
- Saigon Tourist - Tận hưởng bản sắc Việt
- Phim tuyên truyền
- Cung đường vàng Tây Bắc
- Shoe Cooking
- Hồ sơ hoang dã - Wild Case Files

=== LadyTV (TVF - Phụ nữ & Gia đình) ===
- Nè biết gì chưa
- Thợ săn trứng rồng
- Siêu ảo thuật gia
- Khám phá thế giới
- Thể thao sức sống và đam mê
- Thương hiệu Việt - Hàng Việt với cuộc sống
- Hoàn thiện bản thân
- Phụ nữ chúng mình
- Làng trong phố - phố trong làng
- Chuyện thảm đỏ
- Sổ tay nội trợ
- Góc khuất
- Cảnh báo an toàn sống
- Sao muôn màu

=== SCTV14 - Kênh phim Việt ===
- Giai điệu Phim Việt
- Kết nối Phim Việt
- Petrolimex ký sự
- Sở thích ngôi sao
- Tui hỏi sao trả lời

=== SCTV15 - SSport2 ===
- Bản tin Ssports
- Toàn cảnh Ssports
- Tường thuật thể thao
- Trò chơi tương tác
- Sắc màu ngoại hạng

=== SCTV17 - SSport ===
- Bản tin Thế giới ESport
- Hola Liga
- Hẹn hò cùng SSport

=== Kênh 18 ===
- Phát lại các chương trình của các kênh SCTV.
- Phim truyện

=== SCTV19 - Channel T ===
- Phim truyện

=== SCTV20 ===
- Bóng thời gian
- Bức tranh âm nhạc
- Khúc hoài niệm
- Khúc từ tình
- Khúc xuân nồng
- Màu thời gian
- Mộc (Unplugged)

==== iTV (Việt Nam) ====
- BeatUp
- Ca khúc kinh điển
- iTV Now Việt Nam/Quốc tế
- iMusic Top Hits Việt Nam/Quốc tế
- iRing Top Hits
- iTV Remix
- iCover
- iPlaylist
- OST
- Phim ngắn (Sitcom)
- Tình khúc Bolero

=== SCTV21 - Việt Nam Ký Ức ===
- Yoga - Sự trải nghiệm
- Chuyện giản dị
- Sống yêu thương
- Di sản văn hóa
- Ký ức Việt
- Tre xanh
- Nghệ thuật Việt
- Thái cực quyền
- Văn hóa ẩm thực Việt
- Nhất nghệ tinh
- Một ngày làm người Việt
- Phim tài liệu
- Chiếu bóng
- Thiền trong cuộc sống
- Nét hà thành
- Hồ sơ văn hóa Việt
- Ai là ai
- Khỏe để An Viên
- Ký ức phú sa

=== SCTV22 - SSport1 ===
- Tường thuật thể thao

== K+ ==
=== K+ SPORT 1 ===
- 1 kèm 1
- Phim điện ảnh
- Phim truyền hình
- Chat với huyền thoại
- Chelsea cùng khoảnh khắc bất tử
- Khai cuộc rực lửa
- Cuối tuần rực lửa
- K+ Sport Podcast
- Phỏng vấn ngôi sao
- Chân dung ngoại hạng
- Góc nhìn huyền thoại
- Câu chuyện ngoại hạng
- Bản tin thể thao - News Room
- Bản tin cập nhật - News Now
- Đội tuyển tôi yêu
- Đường tới nước Nga
- Hành trình Copa America 2019
- Hội quán ngoại hạng
- Khai cuộc ngoại hạng
- Hồi ức ngoại hạng
- Khoảnh khắc ngoại hạng
- Những biểu tượng Champions League
- My Club - Câu lạc bộ của tôi
- Người hùng ngoại hạng
- Những người mở đường: Không bỏ cuộc
- Top 10 tuyệt tác
- EPL bàn thắng giữa tuần
- Sa bàn - Data Room
- Super Match
- Super Sunday
  - Multifoot
  - Data Room
- Tạp chí bóng đá
- Tạp chí UEFA Champions League, UEFA Europa League', Giải bóng đá Ngoại hạng Anh
- Thế giới ngoại hạng
- Thứ bảy ngoại hạng
- Thứ 9 ngoại hạng
- Phim tài liệu thể thao
- Thế giới bàn thắng - Goal Stream
- Trận đấu 1 phút
- Trận đấu 5 phút
- Trận đấu 10 phút
- Trên đỉnh châu Âu
  - Trên đỉnh châu Âu: IQ
- Tường thuật thể thao
- Tường thuật bóng đá
- Talkshow AFC Women's Champions League
- Sport+
- Speed+
- Huyền thoại Ngoại hạng Anh
- Phạm Tấn & Anh Quân: The Fact & Views
- Nhà vua ngoại hạng
- Arsenal cùng khoảnh khắc bất tử
- Vua phá lưới ngoại hạng
- Vũ điệu sân cỏ Ngoại hạng Anh
- Gary Neville - Ký ức sân cỏ
- EPL - Đội hình sân cỏ
- Những nghệ sĩ tại EPL
- Huyền thoại Ngoại hạng Anh
- Sự lựa chọn của tôi
- K+ Tactical Cam
- VAR+ Giải mã ngoại hạng

=== K+ SPORT 2 ===
- Đội tuyển tôi yêu
- Phim truyền hình
- Phim tài liệu
- Phim điện ảnh
- Phim Sitcom
- Gameshow
- Chương trình thực tế
- Khai cuộc ngoại hạng
- Tạp chí bóng đá: UEFA Champions League, UEFA Europa League, Giải bóng đá Ngoại hạng Anh,...
- Thế giới ngoại hạng
- Thứ bảy ngoại hạng
- Trên đỉnh châu Âu
  - Trên đỉnh châu Âu: IQ
- Tường thuật thể thao
- Tường thật bóng đá
- Tennis+
- Speed+
- Tạp chí thể thao: ATP, PGA Tour, UFC, Cage Warrious, WRC, Indycar Series
- Kỹ thật ATP
- Người dẫn đầu
- Ấn tượng ATP Tour
- Dấu chân siêu hổ

=== K+ CINE ===
- Các cặp đôi Hollywood
- Phim hay xem ngay!
- Clip ca nhạc - Music Clip
- Phim chiếu rạp
- Phim điện ảnh và những ngôi sao
- Phim Việt cuối tháng
- Lên đèn - Lights On
- Phim truyền hình đỉnh cao
- Tường thuật bóng đá
- Super Match
- Canal+ Football Plus
- Trận đấu 5 phút
- Multifoot
- Nhà ảo thuật
- Đội bóng vinh quang
- Phút bù giờ
- Khoảnh khắc điện ảnh
- Điểm hẹn thể thao
- Tạp chí thể thao
- Thứ 7 ngoại hạng
- Tôi sẽ làm bất cứ điều gì
- Hành tinh vuông
- Phim tài liệu
- Trận đấu 10 phút
- Điểm hẹn
- Khoảnh khắc Jennifer
- Người truyền lửa
- Leak +
- Music +
- Ngôi sao điện ảnh
- Món ngon nhà làm

=== K+ ACTION ===
- Bếp của mẹ
- Lên đèn - Lights On
- Muzik+
- Chương trình thực tế
- Ca nhạc
- Gameshow
- Thế giới động vật
- Chương trình thiếu nhi
- Khám phá thế giới
- Clip ca nhạc - Music Clip
- Chương trình Xuân - Đón năm mới (Tiếp sóng trên VTV vào đêm giao thừa âm lịch hằng năm)
- Phim hay xem ngay
- Phim điện ảnh cuối tuần
- Phim truyền hình
- Phim Việt cuối tháng
- Tường thuật bóng đá (Trực tiếp)
- Tường thuật thể thao (Trực tiếp)
- Super Match

=== K+ KIDS ===
- Chuyên gia ngoại hạng nhí
- Phim hoạt hình

== MTV Vietnam ==
=== Defunct broadcast ===
- MTV 8
- MTV Thích mê - Most Wanted
- Viet Must
- MTV Series (phát sóng đến 9/12/2021 với bộ phim cuối cùng là Trò chơi tình ái)
- Thần tượng đột kích - MTV School Attack
- MTV Exit
- Tìm kiếm tài năng - Vietnam's got talent
- Star @ MTV
- MTV Wow
- MTV NOW
- Bước nhảy xì tin
- Đại sứ ước mơ
- Việt Essential (phát sóng đến 23/5/2021)
- Japan Hits
- MTV Top Ten
- MTV Top 5
- MTV Chart Attack Top 5
- MTV Musika
- Punk'D
- OK Karaoke
- Moving In
- Vietmust
- MTV News
- MTV @ The Movies
- MTV School Fest
- Sức bật cùng trẻ
- Bài hát mỗi tuần
- Chart Attack
- It's Your MTV
- K-Wave
- MTV Flashback
- MTV Fresh
- MTV Hits
- MTV Indie
- MTV Party Anthem
- MTV Push
- MTV Rock
- MTV Urban
- Việt Hits
- MTV World Stage
- MTV Unplugged
- MTV Showcase
- Catfish: The TV Show
- Celeb Ex In The City
- Celebrity Bumps: Famous and Pregnant
- Deliciousness
- Double Shot at Love with DJ Pauly D and Vinny
- Ex On The Beach
- M List
- MTV At The Movie
- MTV Cribs US
- MTV Cover
- Ngẫu hứng âm nhạc
- Ridiculousness
- The Challenge: Spies, Lies & Allies

== Other ==
=== Sports event ===
==== VTVCab ====
- Đường tới Seagames/World Cup/Euro/Olympic...
- Nhật ký Seagames/World Cup/Euro/Olympic...
- Tôi yêu World Cup (2014)
- Ngôi sao World Cup (2014)
- Muôn màu World Cup (2010)
- Muôn màu Seagames
- Bình luận World Cup/Euro/Seagames...
- Khai cuộc VLeague
- Sôi động VLeague

=== Promotional programs ===
==== VTVCab ====
- Hành trình VCTV
- Kết nối VTVCab
- VCTV tương tác
- VCTV kết nối
- Với khán giả VCTV

== See also ==
- List of programmes broadcast by VTC
